= Burning the Books =

2020 book by Richard Ovenden

- First US edition
- Author: Richard Ovenden
- Subject: Books, censorship
- Publisher: Belknap Press (US); John Murray (UK)
- Publication date: 2020
- Pages: 320 p.
- ISBN: 9780674241206

Burning the Books: A History of the Deliberate Destruction of Knowledge is a 2020 book by Bodleian Libraries Director Richard Ovenden on the history of intentional recorded knowledge destruction. It was shortlisted for the 2021 Wolfson History Prize.

The UK version of the book was published as Burning the Books: A History of Knowledge Under Attack and was reviewed in The Guardian.

The book was abridged and broadcast on BBC Radio 4 in six episodes, read by Anthony Head.

== Reviews ==
- Cooke, Rachel (August 31, 2020). "Burning the Books by Richard Ovenden review – the libraries we have lost". The Guardian. ISSN 0261-3077.
- Hart, Christopher (August 30, 2020). "Burning the Books by Richard Ovenden, review — knowledge under attack from the Nazis to Twitter". The Times. ISSN 0140-0460.
- Howse, Christopher (September 5, 2020). "Burning the Books by Richard Ovenden review: we can't keep all records – so what do we destroy?". The Daily Telegraph. ISSN 0307-1235.
- Skapinker, Michael (September 1, 2020). "Burning the Books — why memory matters". Financial Times.

== Works cited by the book ==
- Bryce, Trevor (2004). Life and Society in the Hittite World. Oxford University Press. ISBN 978-0-19-927588-5.
- Carpenter, Humphrey (2008). The Seven Lives of John Murray: The Story of a Publishing Dynasty 1768–2002. John Murray. ISBN 9780719565328.
- Casson, Lionel (2002). Libraries in the Ancient World. Yale University Press. ISBN 9780300097214.
- Clark, John Willis (1909). The Care of Books: An Essay on the Development of Libraries and Their Fittings, From the Earliest Times to the End of the Eighteenth Century. Cambridge University Press.
- Conaway, James (2000). America's Library: The Story of the Library of Congress 1800–2000. Yale University Press. ISBN 9780300083088.
- Duffy, Eamon (1992). The Stripping of the Altars: Traditional Religion in England c.1400–c.1580. Yale University Press. ISBN 9780300060768.
- Gleig, George Robert (1821). A Narrative of the Campaigns of the British Army at Washington and New Orleans, Under Generals Ross. John Murray.
- Harris, P.R. (1998). A History of the British Museum Library 1753–1973. British Library. ISBN 9780712345620.
- Hayner, Priscilla B. (2011). Unspeakable Truths: Transitional Justice and the Challenge of Truth Commissions. Routledge.
- Knuth, Rebecca (2003). Libricide: The Regime-Sponsored Destruction of Books and Libraries in the Twentieth Century. Praeger.
- Layard, Austen H. (1853). Discoveries in the Ruins of Nineveh and Babylon. John Murray.
- Leland, John (1895). The Laboryouse Journey & Serche of John Leylande for Englandes Antiquitees ... S.
- Lipstadt, Deborah (1993). Denying the Holocaust: The Growing Assault on Truth and Memory. Free Press. ISBN 9780029192351.
- Macray, William Dunn (1890). Annals of the Bodleian Library Oxford.
- Makiya, Kanan (1998). Republic of Fear: The Politics of Modern Iraq. University of California Press. ISBN 9780520214392.
- Meehan, Bernard (1999). The Book of Kells. Thames & Hudson. ISBN 9780500281468.
- Mercier, Désiré-Félicien-François-Joseph (1915). Pastoral Letter of his Eminence Cardinal Mercier Archbishop of Malines Primate of Belgium Christmas 1914. Burns & Oates Ltd.
- Motion, Andrew (1993). Philip Larkin: A Writer's Life. Faber & Faber.
- Orwell, George (2003). Nineteen Eighty-Four. Penguin.
- Peterson, William S. (1991). The Kelmscott Press: A History of William Morris's Typographical Adventure. Oxford University Press. ISBN 978-0-19-812887-8.
- Plath, Sylvia (1983). The Journals of Sylvia Plath, Foreword by Ted Hughes. Ballantyne Books. ISBN 9780345351685.
- Poole, Reginald Lane (1912). A Lecture on the History of the University Archives. Clarendon Press.
- Price, David H. (2011). Johannes Reuchlin and the Campaign to Destroy Jewish Books. Oxford University Press.
- Rich, Claudius James (1836). Narrative of a Residence in Koordistan, and on the Site of Ancient Nineveh. James Duncan. ISBN 9780576034661.
- Toynbee, Arnold J. (1917). The German Terror in Belgium. Hodder & Stoughton.
- Tripp, Charles (2000). A History of Iraq. Cambridge University Press.
