= Skapinker =

Skapinker is a surname. Notable people with the surname include:

- Mark Skapinker, South African-born Canadian venture capitalist
- Michael Skapinker (born 1955), South African journalist
