= Fallen Idol =

Fallen Idol(s) may refer to:

== Television episodes ==
- "Fallen Idol" (The Colbys), 1986
- "Fallen Idol" (Dad's Army), 1970
- "Fallen Idol" (M*A*S*H), 1977
- "Fallen Idols" (CSI), 2007
- "Fallen Idols" (Supernatural), 2009

== Other ==
- A Fallen Idol, a 1919 American drama film starring Evelyn Nesbit
- The Fallen Idol (film), a 1948 British crime drama directed by Carol Reed
- Fallen Idols (album) or the title song, by Lord, 2019
- Fallen Idols: Twelve Statues That Made History, a 2021 book by Alex von Tunzelmann
- Fallen Idols: Nick and Aaron Carter, a docuseries produced by Max in 2024
