= J. H. Elliott =

British historian and Hispanist (1930–2022)

Sir J. H. Elliott FBA
- Born: John Huxtable Elliott; 23 June 1930; Reading, Berkshire, England
- Died: 10 March 2022 (aged 91); Oxford, Oxfordshire, England
- Spouse: Oonah Sophia Butler (m. 1958)

Academic background
- Education: Trinity College, Cambridge
- Thesis: Castile and Catalonia During the Ministry of the Conde Duque de Olivares (1956)
- Doctoral advisor: Sir Herbert Butterfield

Academic work
- Discipline: History
- Sub-discipline: Atlantic history; early-modern Spanish history
- Institutions: University of Cambridge; King's College, London; Institute for Advanced Study; Oriel College, Oxford
- Doctoral students: Geoffrey Parker

Sir John Huxtable Elliott FBA (23 June 1930 – 10 March 2022) was a British historian and Hispanist who was Regius Professor at the University of Oxford and honorary fellow of Oriel College, Oxford, and Trinity College, Cambridge. He published under the name J. H. Elliott.

== Biography ==
Born in Reading, Berkshire, on 23 June 1930, Elliott was educated at Eton College and Trinity College, Cambridge. He was an assistant lecturer at Cambridge University from 1957 to 1962 and Lecturer in History from 1962 until 1967, and was subsequently Professor of History at King's College, London, between 1968 and 1973. In 1972 he was elected to the Fellowship of the British Academy. He was elected to the American Academy of Arts and Sciences in 1977 and the American Philosophical Society in 1982. Elliott was Professor in the School of Historical Studies at the Institute for Advanced Study in Princeton, New Jersey, from 1973 to 1990, and was Regius Professor of Modern History, Oxford, between 1990 and 1997.

He held honorary doctorates from the Autonomous University of Madrid (1983), the universities of Genoa (1992), Portsmouth (1993), Barcelona (1994), Warwick (1995), Brown University (1996), Valencia (1998), Lleida (1999), Complutense University of Madrid (2003), College of William & Mary (2005), London (2007), Charles III University of Madrid (2008), Seville (2011), Alcalá (2012), and Cambridge (2013). Elliott was a Fellow of the Rothermere American Institute, University of Oxford, of whose Founding Council he was also a member.

Elliott was knighted in the 1994 New Year Honours for services to history and was decorated with Commander of Isabella the Catholic in 1987, the Grand Cross of Alfonso the Wise in 1988, the Grand Cross of Isabella the Catholic in 1996, and the Creu de Sant Jordi in 1999. An eminent Hispanist, he was given the Prince of Asturias Prize in 1996 for his contributions to the social sciences. For his outstanding contributions to the history of Spain and the Spanish Empire in the early modern period, Elliott was awarded the Balzan Prize for History, 1500–1800, in 1999. He was a corresponding member of the Real Academia de la Historia since 1965.

His studies of the Iberian Peninsula and the Spanish Empire helped the understanding of the problems confronting 16th- and 17th-century Spain, and the attempts of its leaders to avert its decline. He is considered, together with Raymond Carr and Angus Mackay, a major figure in developing Spanish historiography.

Elliott's principal publications are The Revolt of the Catalans (1963); The Old World and the New, 1492–1650 (1970); and The Count-Duke of Olivares (1986). His Richelieu and Olivares (1987) won the Leo Gershoy Award of the American Historical Association and, in 1992, the Prize XVIIe. In 2006, his book Empires of the Atlantic World: Britain and Spain in America, 1492–1830 was published by Yale University Press, winning the Francis Parkman Prize the following year. In 2012, he published his reflections on the progress of historical scholarship in History in the Making.

In 1995, Spain, Europe, and the Atlantic World: Essays in Honour of John H. Elliott, edited by Richard L. Kagan and Geoffrey Parker, was published by Cambridge University Press.

Elliott was hospitalised due to pneumonia and kidney complications, at the John Radcliffe Hospital in Oxford, on 5 March 2022. He died on 10 March, at the age of 91.

== Works ==
- The Revolt of the Catalans: A Study in the Decline of Spain, 1598–1640 (Cambridge University Press, 1963; pbk reprint, 1984). ISBN 978-0521278904
- Imperial Spain: 1469–1716 (London 1963, revised repr. Penguin Books, 2002). ISBN 978-0141007038
- Europe Divided, 1559–1598 (London 1963; 2nd ed. 2000). ISBN 978-0631217800
- The Old World and The New 1492–1650 (Cambridge University Press, 1970; pbk reprint, 2008). ISBN 978-0521427098
- Memoriales y cartas del Conde-Duque de Olivares, 2 vols. (with José F. de la Peña) (Madrid 1978–80). ISBN 978-8420401119
- Richelieu and Olivares (Cambridge University Press, 1984; pbk reprint, 2003). ISBN 978-0521262057
- The Count-Duke Olivares: The Statesman in an Age of Decline (Yale University Press 1986, revised repr. 1989). ISBN 978-0300044997
- Spain and Its World, 1500–1700: Selected Essays (Yale University Press, 1989; pbk reprint, 1990). ISBN 978-0300048636
- The World of the Favourite (edited, with L. W. B. Brockliss) (Yale University Press, 1999). ISBN 978-0300076448
- The Sale of the Century: Artistic Relations between Spain and Great Britain, 1604–1655 (with Jonathan Brown) (Yale University Press 2002). ISBN 978-0300097610
- A Palace for a King: The Buen Retiro and the Court of Philip IV, with Jonathan Brown (Yale University Press, 2003 [1986]). ISBN 978-0300101850
- Empires of the Atlantic World: Britain and Spain, 1492–1830 (Yale University Press, 2006). ISBN 978-0300123999
- Spain, Europe and the Wider World, 1500–1800 (Yale University Press, 2009). ISBN 978-0300145373
- History in the Making (Yale University Press, 2012). ISBN 978-0300186383
- Scots and Catalans: Union and Disunion (Yale University Press, 2018; pbk reprint, 2020). ISBN 978-0300253382

Academic offices
Preceded by Sir Michael Howard	Regius Professor of Modern History at the University of Oxford; 1990–1997	Succeeded by R. J. W. Evans
Awards
Preceded by Marianne Elliott	Leo Gershoy Award; 1985	Succeeded by J. M. Beattie
Preceded by Richard Davenport-Hines	Wolfson History Prize; 1986; With: Jonathan Israel	Succeeded by Rees Davies
Preceded by John Grigg	Wolfson History Prize; 1986; With: Jonathan Israel	Succeeded by John Pemble
Preceded by Miquel Batllori	Princess of Asturias Award for Social Sciences; 1996	Succeeded by Martí de Riquer i Morera
Preceded by Joaquim Veríssimo Serrão	Princess of Asturias Award for Social Sciences; 1996	Succeeded by Martí de Riquer i Morera
Preceded by Harmon Craig	Balzan Prize; 1999; With: Luigi Luca Cavalli-Sforza, Mikhael Gromov, and Paul Ricœur	Succeeded by Abdul Sattar Edhi
Preceded by Sir Robert May	Balzan Prize; 1999; With: Luigi Luca Cavalli-Sforza, Mikhael Gromov, and Paul Ricœur	Succeeded by Ilkka Hanski
Preceded by Sir Robert May	Balzan Prize; 1999; With: Luigi Luca Cavalli-Sforza, Mikhael Gromov, and Paul Ricœur	Succeeded by Michel Mayor
Preceded by Andrzej Walicki	Balzan Prize; 1999; With: Luigi Luca Cavalli-Sforza, Mikhael Gromov, and Paul Ricœur	Succeeded by Michael Stolleis
Preceded by Andrzej Walicki	Balzan Prize; 1999; With: Luigi Luca Cavalli-Sforza, Mikhael Gromov, and Paul Ricœur	Succeeded by Martin Litchfield West
Preceded by Megan Marshall	Francis Parkman Prize; 2007	Succeeded by Jean Edward Smith
