= Red Heat: Conspiracy, Murder and the Cold War in the Caribbean =

2011 historical study by Alex von Tunzelmann

Red Heat: Conspiracy, Murder, and the Cold War in the Caribbean
- The first edition cover of the book.
- Author: Alex von Tunzelmann
- Language: English
- Subject: History; Cold War
- Publisher: Henry Holt and Company
- Publication date: 2011
- Publication place: United States
- Media type: Print (Hardcover & Paperback)
- Pages: 449
- ISBN: 9780805090673

Red Heat: Conspiracy, Murder, and the Cold War in the Caribbean is a historical study of the political scene in the Caribbean during the 1950s and 1960s, written by the British historian Alex von Tunzelmann and first published in 2011 by Henry Holt and Company. Educated at Oxford University, Von Tunzelmann (1977-) had previously published a study of the independence of India, entitled Indian Summer: The Secret History of the End of an Empire (2007).

Red Heat explores the political regimes of three presidents who each ruled over a Caribbean nation during the 1950s and 1960s; François Duvalier of Haiti, Rafael Trujillo of the Dominican Republic and Fidel Castro of Cuba. In particular it looks at their administrations in the context of the Cold War between the capitalist United States and the socialist Soviet Union, with the former backing Duvalier and Trujillo and the latter backing Castro.

The book was widely reviewed in the mainstream press in both the United Kingdom and United States, gaining a predominantly positive reception, with most reviewers praising von Tunzelmann's writing style.

== Synopsis ==
The book covers the Dwight D. Eisenhower, John F. Kennedy, and Lyndon B. Johnson administrations in their dealings with Fulgencio Batista, Fidel Castro, Rafael Trujillo and François Duvalier. Tunzelmann describes the US administration as being blindsided during the Batista regime. As Castro emerges, the spectre of communism at its backdoor becomes the overriding concern of American policy in its dealings with its neighbors. Tunzelmann makes the case that Fidel Castro (in contrast to his brother Raúl and Che Guevara) was not a communist at the beginning of the revolution, rather a nationalist who wanted to free his country from US domination and corruption, yet was gradually pushed by American policy into the communist camp. His initial overtures toward the US government were rebuffed, and the CIA made numerous attempts to undermine the revolution and assassinate him. With the ill-fated Bay of Pigs invasion, there was no way back. Castro sought shelter in the Soviet camp. The escalating conflict with Castro led to the extremely dangerous Cuban Missile Crisis when blunders by the superpowers almost led to a nuclear holocaust. In their anti-communistic phobia the US supported other regimes in the Caribbean to prevent another communistic take-over. In the course of this policy, it supported knowingly murderous dictators such as Duvalier and Trujillo. Tunzelmann explains that these "puppets" skillfully exploited their masters producing communist threats to extract money and support. "The result was tyranny, conspiracy, murder, and black magic; it was poverty, violence, and a new model of global interventionism that still dominates American policy." (page 6) The tragic outcome of the secret war in the Caribbean was that it "toppled democracies, supported dictators, and financed terrorism". (page 376)

== Reception ==
=== U.K. press reviews ===
In the London Evening Standard, Ian Thomson referred to the book as "a zingy, well-researched history of the Cold War and its depredations in the Caribbean" which "offers a James Ellroy-like canvas of Duvalierist corruption, dubious CIA operatives and White House paranoia." Ultimately, Thomson considering it to be a "highly readable synthesis of all the available accounts" already published of the period.

Von Tunzelmann asserts that the political labels of the region were a sham: "democracy" was dictatorship; leaders veered to the rhetoric of the right or left according to advantage; a communist was anyone, however rightwing or nationalistic, whom the ruling regime wanted tarnished in the eyes of the US.

— Jad Adams, reviewer for The Guardian

Writing for the U.K. newspaper The Guardian, Jad Adams described Red Heat as providing a "vivid image" of the events in the Caribbean at the time, believing that it "deftly juggles" the histories of Cuba, Haiti and the Dominican Republic. He positively noted that the book's dust jacket "is designed like that for a thriller, and there is certainly a deal of sex and violence between these covers, told at a cracking pace."

The journalist and historian Richard Gott, writing in The Observer, noted his opinion that it was "refreshing to have the view of a writer who was not alive at the time", with Von Tunzelmann therefore being "unaffected by personal reminiscence". Gott felt that as a result the author was clearly "amazed" by what she had unearthed in the "archives and the huge library of published works" on the subject, presenting her conclusions in a "forthright" manner.

=== U.S. press reviews ===
In his article for newspaper The Washington Post, David Hoffman described Red Heat as containing "Suitcases full of cash, torture chambers, gunboats, coups, dictatorship and revolutionary fervor spill[ing] out of these pages." Noting that Von Tunzelmann set Castro apart from Trujillo and Duvalier by portraying him in a more positive light, Hoffman argues that in her writing, the author "carries a distinct, admonishing voice" which was evidently "disdainful of the errors made by the United States [and] outraged by the brutality of the island bosses". Furthermore, he felt that she "packs a lot into these pages, sometimes more than a reader can absorb, including a flock of minor characters."

The New York Times featured a review of the book by the news correspondent Tom Gjelten, who noted that in his opinion, Von Tunzelmann had clearly set out to emphasise that this period was "a deplorable chapter in American history", an assessment which he agreed with. Expanding on this, he felt however that whilst the work was "thorough in scope and quite readable", von Tunzelmann was "so scolding in tone that her book is harder to finish than it should be." Feeling that the author had sometimes pushed her own opinions ahead of the evidence, Gjelten wrote that:

Most of the references cited by von Tunzelmann consist of books by other people, but she apparently has read enough to satisfy her curiosity on questions that have confounded other historians, like when, exactly, Fidel Castro actually became a Communist. She declares flatly that when he announced in 1961 that he had long been a Marxist-Leninist in secret, "it was not accurate. It was meant to impress the Soviets." Maybe, but we do not know that for sure.

Ultimately, he felt that the book was not as good as that of its predecessor, Indian Summer, because its author "overreaches in her assessment of her story's importance", claiming that the events in the Caribbean at this time dramatically changed the world, something he was sceptical about.

Writing in The Huffington Post, Arian Smedley was largely positive of the book, noting that the "author's editorial comments make for an interesting read, but they sometimes get in the way of the story." Believing that von Tunzelmann "does make points that aren't hard to agree with", Smedly cited the example of the "inherent hypocrisy of the U.S. intervening in Cuba to protect against the potential danger of communism while ignoring human rights violations in neighboring nations." Ultimately, Smedley felt that "At points in the book, Red Heat is so bizarre, you may not believe what you're reading, and at times, the story is so horrifying, you may be brought to tears."
