= Joan de Hamel =

NZ children's writer

Joan de Hamel (31 March 1924 – 28 July 2011) was a New Zealand children's writer. She grew up in London, England and later moved to the Otago Peninsula. In addition to her writing she worked as a teacher, raised a family, and bred Angora goats.

== Personal life ==
Joan de Hamel grew up in London and married Francis de Hamel in England in 1948. She moved to New Zealand with her physician husband and first three children, Michael, Christopher and Geoffrey (William) in 1955, settling on the Otago Peninsula. Her next two sons, Richard and Quentin, were born in 1960 and 1963. Her second son is the author, British academic librarian and expert on mediaeval manuscripts Christopher de Hamel, the author of Meetings with Remarkable Manuscripts. Joan de Hamel lived on the Otago Peninsula for the rest of her life, becoming a breeder of Angora goats. She died in 2011; her husband outlived her by three years, dying in New Zealand in 2014.

== Writing ==
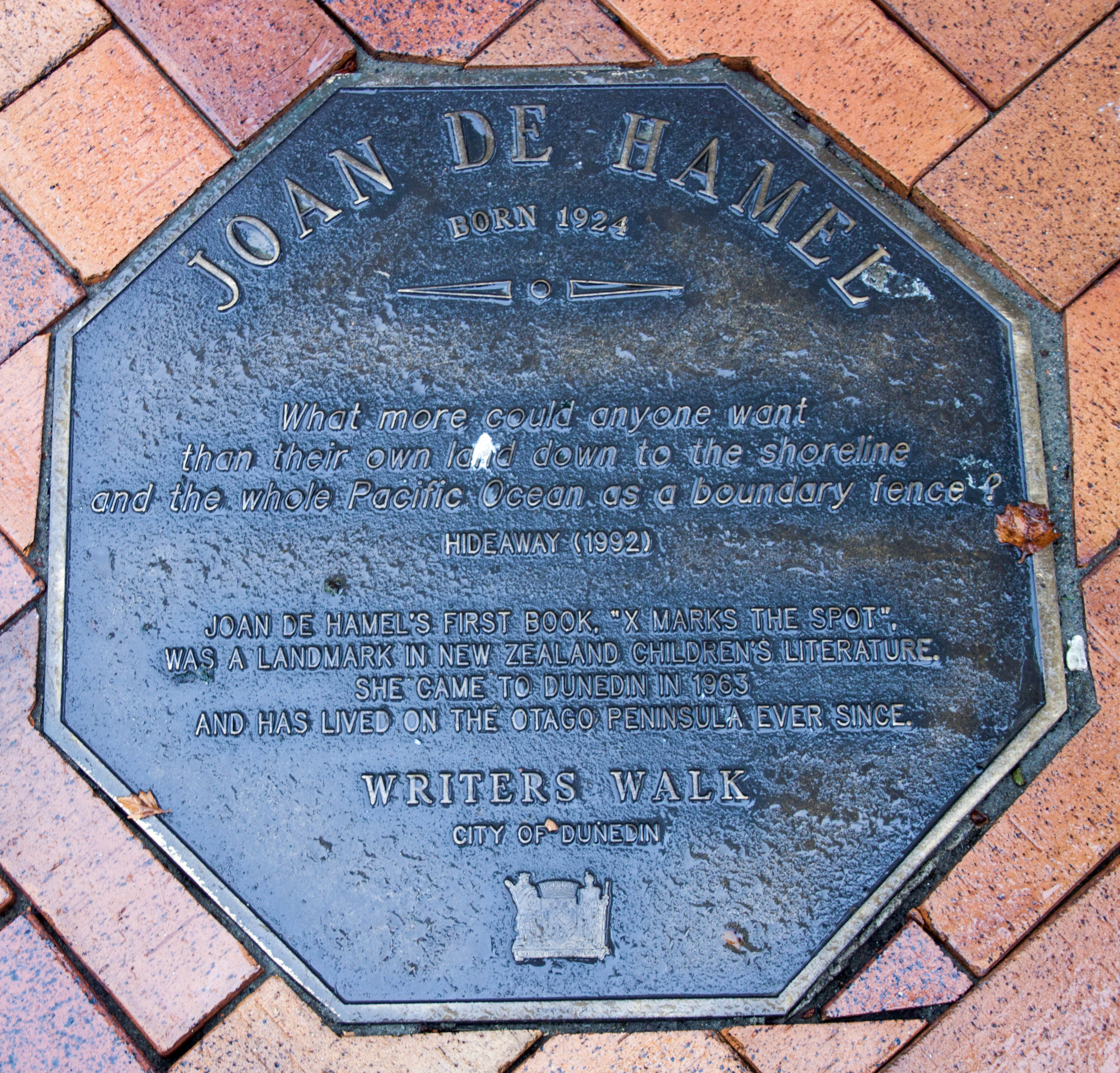
Memorial plaque dedicated to Joan de Hamel in Dunedin, on the Writers' Walk on the Octagon. The text under the quotation reads "Joan de Hamel's first book, 'X Marks the Spot', was a landmark in New Zealand's children's literature. She came to Dunedin in 1963 and has lived on the Otago Peninsula ever since."

De Hamel won the 1979 Esther Glen Award for Take the Long Path (1978), and the 1985 A.W. Reed Memorial Award for Hemi's Pet (1985). She has been described as "a children's writer whose popular stories have a timeless appeal". X Marks the Spot was reprinted more than five times, twenty years after it was written. A plaque honouring de Hamel was installed on the Dunedin Writers' Walk in the Octagon. The plaque has a quotation from her book Hideway, "What more could anyone want than their own land down to the shoreline and the whole Pacific Ocean as a boundary fence?". A time capsule is buried under the plaque, in reference to de Hamel's book X Marks the Spot.

Other books written include:

- X Marks the Spot (1973)
- The Third Eye (1987)
- Hideaway (1992)
- Hemi and the Shorty Pyjamas (1996)
