= Medical Visions =

2013 non-fiction book by Kirsten Ostherr

Medical Visions: Producing the Patient through Film, Television, and Imaging Technologies
- Author: Kirsten Ostherr
- Publisher: Oxford University Press
- Publication date: 2013

Medical Visions: Producing the Patient through Film, Television, and Imaging Technologies is a non-fiction book by Kirsten Ostherr. It was published in 2013 by Oxford University Press.

== General references ==
- Guy, Mary (2015-07-28). "Medical Visions: Producing the Patient Through Film, Television, and Imaging Technologies". Medical Law Review fwv033. doi:10.1093/medlaw/fwv033. ISSN 0967-0742.
- Jordanova, Ludmilla (2014). "Medical Visions: Producing the Patient through Film, Television, and Imaging Technologies by Kirsten Ostherr (review)". Literature and Medicine. 32 (1): 224–227. ISSN 1080-6571.
- Willis, Martin (July 2016). "Book Review: Medical Visions: Producing the Patient Through Film, Television, and Imaging Technologies". Critical Studies in Television: The International Journal of Television Studies. 11 (2): 257–260. doi:10.1177/1749602016642932. ISSN 1749-6020.
