= Wolfson History Prize =

Literary awards for history in the UK

- Awarded for: to promote and encourage standards of excellence in the writing of history for the general public
- Country: United Kingdom
- Presented by: Wolfson Foundation
- Formerly called: Wolfson Literary Awards
- First award: 1972; 54 years ago
- Website: www.wolfsonhistoryprize.org.uk

The Wolfson History Prize is an annual literary award in the United Kingdom which is intended to promote and encourage excellence in the writing of history for the general public.

== History ==
The Wolfson Literary Awards were established in 1972 by the Wolfson Foundation.

== Activities ==
Prizes are given annually for two or three exceptional works published during the year, with an occasional "oeuvre" prize (a general award for an individual's distinguished contribution to the writing of history). They are awarded and administered by the Wolfson Foundation, with winning books being chosen by a panel of judges composed of historians.

In order to qualify for consideration, a book must be published in the United Kingdom and the author must be a British subject at the time the award is made and normally resident in the UK. Books should be readable, scholarly, and accessible to the lay reader. Prizes are awarded in the summer following the year of the books' publication; however, until 1987 prizes were awarded at the end of the competition year.

== Honourees ==
=== 1970s ===
Wolfson History Prize honourees (1970s–1979)
Year	Author	Title	Publisher
1972	Michael Howard	The Grand Strategy: August 1942 – September 1943	Her Majesty's Stationery Office
1972	Keith Thomas	Religion and the Decline of Magic	Weidenfeld & Nicolson
1973	W. L. Warren	Henry II	Eyre & Spottiswoode
1973	Frances Yates	The Rosicrucian Enlightenment	Routledge & Keegan Paul
1974	Moses Finley	The Ancient Economy	Chatto & Windus
1974	Theodore Zeldin	France, 1848–1945: Ambition, Love and Politics	Oxford University Press
1975	Frances Donaldson	Edward VIII	Weidenfeld & Nicolson
1975	Olwen Hufton	The Poor of Eighteenth-century France 1750–1789	Oxford University Press
1976	Nikolaus Pevsner	A History of Building Types	Thames & Hudson
1976	Norman Stone	The Eastern Front: 1914–17	Hodder & Stoughton
1977	Simon Schama	Patriots and Liberators: Revolution in the Netherlands 1780–1813	Collins
1977	Denis Mack Smith	Mussolini's Roman Empire	Longman & Co
1978	Alistair Horne	A Savage War of Peace: Algeria, 1954–1962	Macmillan
1979	Richard Cobb	Death in Paris: The Records of the Basse-Geôle de la Seine, October 1795 – September 1801, Vendémiaire Year IV-Fructidor Year IX	Oxford University Press
1979	Quentin Skinner	The Foundations of Modern Political Thought	Cambridge University Press
1979	Mary Soames	Clementine Churchill: The Biography of a Marriage	Cassell

=== 1980s ===
Wolfson History Prize honourees (1980–1989)
Year	Author	Title	Publisher
1980	F. S. L. Lyons	Culture and Anarchy in Ireland, 1890–1939	Oxford University Press
1980	Robert Evans	The Making of the Habsburg Monarchy, 1550–1700: An Interpretation	Oxford University Press
1981	John Wyon Burrow	A Liberal Descent: Victorian Historians and the English Past	Cambridge University Press
1982	John McManners	Death and the Enlightenment: Changing Attitudes to Death Among Christians and Unbelievers in Eighteenth-Century France	Oxford University Press
1983	Martin Gilbert	Winston S. Churchill: Finest Hour, 1939–1941	Heinemann
1983	Kenneth Rose	George V	Weidenfeld & Nicolson
1984	Antonia Fraser	The Weaker Vessel	Weidenfeld & Nicolson
1984	Maurice Keen	Chivalry	Yale University Press
1985	John Grigg	Lloyd George, From Peace To War 1912–1916	Methuen
1985	Richard Davenport-Hines	Dudley Docker: The Life and Times of a Trade Warrior	Cambridge University Press
1986	J. H. Elliott	The Count-Duke of Olivares: The Statesman in an Age of Decline	Yale University Press
1986	Jonathan Israel	European Jewry in the Age of Mercantilism, 1550–1750	Oxford University Press
1987	R. R. Davies	Conquest, Coexistence, and Change: Wales, 1063–1415	Oxford University Press
1987	John Pemble	The Mediterranean Passion: Victorians And Edwardians in the South	Oxford University Press
1988	No award (Note: Until 1987, prizes were awarded at the end of the competition year. However, subsequent prizes were awarded in the summer following the year of the books' publication. Accordingly, there is no prize listed for 1988.)		
1989	Paul Kennedy	The Rise and Fall of the Great Powers: Economic Change and Military Conflict from 1500 To 2000	Unwin Hyman
1989	Richard J. Evans	Death in Hamburg: Society and Politics in the Cholera Years, 1830–1910	Oxford University Press

=== 1990s ===
Wolfson History Prize honourees (1990–1999)
Year	Author	Title	Publisher
1990	Richard A. Fletcher	The Quest for El Cid	Huchinson
1990	Donald Cameron Watt	How War Came: The Immediate Origins of the Second World War, 1938–1939	William Heinemann
1991	Colin Platt	The Architecture of Medieval Britain: A Social History	Yale University Press
1992	John Bossy	Giordano Bruno and the Embassy Affair	Yale University Press
1992	Alan Bullock	Hitler and Stalin: Parallel Lives	HarperCollins
1993	Linda Colley	Britons: Forging the Nation 1707-1837	Yale University Press
1993	Robert Skidelsky	John Maynard Keynes: The Economist as Saviour, 1920–1937	Pan Macmillan
1994	Robert Bartlett	The Making of Europe: Conquest, Colonization and Cultural Change, 950–1350	Viking
1994	Barbara Harvey	Living and Dying in England, 1100–1540: The Monastic Experience	Oxford University Press
1995	Fiona MacCarthy	William Morris: A Life for Our Time	Faber and Faber
1995	John C. G. Rohl	The Kaiser and His Court: Wilhelm II and the Government of Germany	Cambridge University Press
1996	H. C. G. Matthew	Gladstone 1875–1898	Oxford University Press
1997	Orlando Figes	A People's Tragedy: A History of the Russian Revolution	Jonathan Cape
1998	John Brewer	Pleasures of the Imagination: English Culture in the Eighteenth Century	HarperCollins
1998	Patricia Hollis	Jennie Lee: A Life	Oxford University Press
1999	Antony Beevor	Stalingrad	Viking
1999	Amanda Vickery	The Gentleman's Daughter: Women's Lives in Georgian England	Yale University Press

=== 2000s ===
Wolfson History Prize honourees (2000–2009)
Year	Author	Title	Publisher
2000	Joanna Bourke	An Intimate History of Killing	Granta Books
2000	Andrew Roberts	Salisbury: Victorian Titan	Weidenfeld & Nicolson
2001	Ian Kershaw	Hitler, 1936–1945: Nemesis	Allen Lane
2001	Mark Mazower	The Balkans	Weidenfeld & Nicolson
2001	Roy Porter	Enlightenment: Britain and the Creation of the Modern World	Allen Lane
2002	Barry Cunliffe	Facing the Ocean: The Atlantic and Its Peoples	Oxford University Press
2002	Jerry White	London in the 20th Century: A City and Its Peoples	Viking
2003	William Dalrymple	White Mughals: Love and Betrayal in Eighteenth-century India	HarperCollins
2003	Robert Gildea	Marianne in Chains: In Search of the German Occupation	Macmillan
2004	Frances Harris	Transformations of Love: The Friendship of John Evelyn and Margaret Godolphin	Oxford University Press
2004	Julian T. Jackson	The Fall of France: The Nazi Invasion of 1940	Oxford University Press
2004	Diarmaid MacCulloch	Reformation: Europe's House Divided 1490–1700	Allen Lane, Penguin Press
2005	Richard Overy	The Dictators: Hitler's Germany; Stalin's Russia	Allen Lane, Penguin Press
2005	David Reynolds	In Command of History: Churchill Fighting and Writing the Second World War	Allen Lane, Penguin Press
2006	Evelyn Welch	Shopping in the Renaissance	Yale University Press
2006	Christopher Wickham	Framing the Early Middle Ages: Europe and the Mediterranean, 400–800	Oxford University Press
2007	Christopher Clark	Iron Kingdom: The Rise and Downfall of Prussia, 1600–1947	Allen Lane, Penguin Press
2007	Vic Gatrell	City of Laughter: Sex and Satire in Eighteenth-Century London	Atlantic Books
2007	Adam Tooze	The Wages of Destruction: The Making and Breaking of the Nazi Economy	Allen Lane, Penguin Press
2008	John Darwin	After Tamerlane: The Global Story of Empire	Allen Lane
2008	Rosemary Hill	God's Architect: Pugin & the Building of Romantic Britain	Allen Lane
2009	Mary Beard	Pompeii: The Life of a Roman Town	Profile Books
2009	Margaret M. McGowan	Dance in the Renaissance: European Fashion, French Obsession	Yale University Press

=== 2010s ===
Awards after 2016 have a winner and shortlist of five.

Wolfson History Prize honourees (2010–2019)
Year	Author	Title	Publisher
2010	Dominic Lieven	Russia Against Napoleon: The Battle for Europe, 1807–1814	Allen Lane, Penguin Press
2010	Jonathan Sumption	Divided Houses: The Hundred Years War. Vol. 3	Faber and Faber
2011	Ruth Harris	The Man on Devil's Island: The Affair that Divided France	Allen Lane, Penguin Press
2011	Nicholas Thomas	Islanders: The Pacific in the Age of Empire	Yale University Press
2012	Susie Harries	Nikolaus Pevsner: The Life	Chatto & Windus
2012	Alexandra Walsham	The Reformation of the Landscape	Oxford University Press
2013	Susan Brigden	Thomas Wyatt: The Heart's Forest	Faber and Faber
2013	Christopher Duggan	Fascist Voices: An Intimate History of Mussolini's Italy	Boydell Press
2014	Cyprian Broodbank	The Making of the Middle Sea	Thames & Hudson
2014	Catherine Merridale	Red Fortress: The Secret Heart of Russia's History	Allen Lane, Penguin Books
2015	Richard Vinen	National Service: Conscription in Britain, 1945–1963	Allen Lane, Penguin Books
2015	Alexander Watson	Ring of Steel: Germany and Austria-Hungary at War, 1914-1918	Allen Lane, Penguin Books
2016	Robin Lane Fox	Augustine: Conversions and Confessions	Basic Books
2016	Nikolaus Wachsmann	KL: A History of the Nazi Concentration Camps	Little, Brown and Company
2017	Christopher de Hamel	Meetings with Remarkable Manuscripts: Twelve Journeys into the Medieval World	Allen Lane
2017	Daniel Beer	The House of The Dead: Siberian Exile Under the Tsar	Penguin Books
2017	Chris Given-Wilson	Henry IV	Yale University Press
2017	Sasha Handley	Sleep in Early Modern England	Yale University Press
2017	Lyndal Roper	Martin Luther: Renegade and Prophet	Vintage
2017	Matthew Strickland	Henry the Young King, 1155–1183	Yale University Press
2018	Peter Marshall	Heretics and Believers: A History of the English Reformation	Yale University Press
2018	Robert Bickers	Out of China: How the Chinese Ended the Era of Western Domination	Penguin Books
2018	Lindsey Fitzharris	The Butchering Art: Joseph Lister's Quest to Transform the Grisly World of Victorian Medicine	Farrar, Straus and Giroux
2018	Tim Grady	A Deadly Legacy: German Jews and the Great War	Yale University Press
2018	Miranda Kaufmann	Black Tudors: The Untold Story	Oneworld Publications
2018	Jan Ruger	Heligoland: Britain, Germany and the Struggle for the North Sea	Oxford University Press
2019	Mary Fulbrook	Reckonings: Legacies of Nazi Persecution and the Quest for Justice	Oxford University Press
2019	John Blair	Building Anglo-Saxon England	Princeton University Press
2019	Margarette Lincoln	Trading in War: London's Maritime World in the Age of Cook and Nelson	Yale University Press
2019	Jeremy Mynott	Birds in the Ancient World: Winged Words	Oxford University Press
2019	Matthew Sturgis	Oscar: A Life	Head of Zeus
2019	Miles Taylor	Empress: Queen Victoria and India	Yale University Press

=== 2020s ===
Wolfson History Prize honourees (2020–present)
Year	Author	Title	Result	Ref.
2020	David Abulafia	The Boundless Sea: A Human History of the Oceans	Winner	
2020	Toby Green	A Fistful of Shells: West Africa from the Rise of the Slave Trade to the Age of Revolution	Shortlist	
2020	John Barton	A History of the Bible: The Book and Its Faiths	Shortlist	
2020	Hallie Rubenhold	The Five: The Untold Lives of the Women Killed by Jack the Ripper	Shortlist	
2020	Marion Turner	Chaucer: A European Life	Shortlist	
2020	Prashant Kidambi	Cricket Country: An Indian Odyssey in the Age of Empire	Shortlist	
2021	Sudhir Hazareesingh	Black Spartacus: The Epic Life of Toussaint Louverture	Winner	
2021	Geoffrey Plank	Atlantic Wars: From the Fifteenth Century to the Age of Revolution	Shortlist	
2021	Richard Ovenden	Burning the Books: A History of Knowledge Under Attack	Shortlist	
2021	Helen McCarthy	Double Lives: A History of Working Motherhood	Shortlist	
2021	Judith Herrin	Ravenna: Capital of Empire, Crucible of Europe	Shortlist	
2021	Rebecca Clifford	Survivors: Children's Lives After the Holocaust	Shortlist	
2022	Clare Jackson	Devil-Land: England Under Siege, 1588–1688	Winner	
2022	Marc David Baer	The Ottomans: Khans, Caesars and Caliphs	Shortlist	
2022	Malcolm Gaskill	The Ruin of All Witches: Life and Death in the New World	Shortlist	
2022	Alex von Tunzelmann	Fallen Idols: Twelve Statues That Made History	Shortlist	
2022	Francesca Stavrakopoulou	God: An Anatomy	Shortlist	
2022	Nicholas Orme	Going to Church in Medieval England	Shortlist	
2023	Halik Kochanski	Resistance: The Underground War in Europe 1939-1945	Winner	
2023	Hakim Adi	African and Caribbean People in Britain: A History	Shortlist	
2023	James Belich	The World the Plague Made: The Black Death and the Rise of Europe	Shortlist	
2023	Henrietta Harrison	The Perils of Interpreting: The Extraordinary Lives of Two Translators between Qing China and the British Empire	Shortlist	
2023	Oskar Jensen	Vagabonds: Life on the Streets of Nineteenth Century London	Shortlist	
2023	Emma Smith	Portable Magic: A History of Books and their Readers	Shortlist	
2024	Joya Chatterji	Shadows at Noon: The South Asian Twentieth Century	Winner	
2024	Nandini Das	Courting India: England, Mughal India and the Origins of Empire	Shortlist	
2024	Nicholas Radburn	Traders in Men: Merchants and the Transformation of the Transatlantic Slave Trade	Shortlist	
2024	Andrew Seaton	Our NHS: A History of Britain’s Best-Loved Institution	Shortlist	
2024	Jonny Steinberg	Winnie & Nelson: Portrait of a Marriage	Shortlist	
2024	Frank Trentmann	Out of the Darkness: The Germans, 1942-2022	Shortlist	
2025	Hannah Durkin	Survivors: The Lost Stories of the Last Captives of the Atlantic Slave Trade	Winner	
2025	Eleanor Barraclough	Embers of the Hands: Hidden Histories of the Viking Age	Shortlist	
2025	Helen Castor	The Eagle and the Hart: The Tragedy of Richard II and Henry IV	Shortlist	
2025	Kieran Connell	Multicultural Britain: A People's History	Shortlist	
2025	Andrew Fleming	The Gravity of Feathers: Fame, Fortune and the Story of St Kilda	Shortlist	
2025	Sara Lodge	The Mysterious Case of the Victorian Female Detective	Shortlist	
2026	Richard Holmes	The Boundless Deep: Young Tennyson, Science and the Crisis of Belief	Shortlist	
2026	Sadiah Qureshi	Vanished: An Unnatural History of Extinction	Shortlist	
2026	Lyndal Roper	Summer of Fire and Blood: The German Peasants' War	Shortlist	
2026	Sam Wetherell	Liverpool: A Story of Britain	Shortlist	
2026	Selena Wisnom	The Library of Ancient Wisdom: Mesopotamia and the Making of History	Shortlist	
2026	Francis Young	Silence of the Gods: The Untold History of Europe's Last Pagan Peoples	Shortlist	

=== List of winners of the Oeuvre Prize ===
- 2005 – Christopher Bayly
- 2002 – Roy Jenkins
- 2000 – Asa Briggs
- 1997 – Eric Hobsbawm
- 1982 – Steven Runciman
- 1981 – Owen Chadwick
- 1978 – Howard Colvin

== See also ==
- List of history awards
  - Alan Ball Local History Awards
  - The Whitfield Prize
- Wolfson family
