= Halik =

Halik may refer to

- Halik (name)
- Halik sa Apoy (Fiery Kiss), a 1998 Philippine drama series
- Halik sa Hangin (Kiss in the Wind), a 2015 Filipino film
- Halik (TV series) (Kiss of Betrayal), a 2018 Philippine drama series
