= OLIS =

OLIS may refer to:

- OECD Committee Information Service, a statistical data source
- Oficjalna Lista Sprzedaży (OLiS), a Polish record chart
- Olís, Iceland Oil Ltd.
- Oxford Libraries Information System, a library catalog
