= Josef Polišenský =

Josef Vincent Polišenský (16 December 1915 in Prostějov – 15 January 2001 in Prague) was a Czech academic historian and Latin Americanist. He is best known in the English-speaking world for his book Tragic Triangle: The Netherlands, Spain and Bohemia, 1617–1621 (Prague, Charles University, 1991), a study of the international political context of the Bohemian Revolt.

His earlier study of the Bohemian Revolt, The Thirty Years War, was translated into English by R. J. W. Evans and published in England by B. T. Batsford (1970) and in the U.S. by University of California Press (1971).

He also wrote a general history of Bohemia, Moravia, Silesia, and Slovakia in a 1947 book, History of Czechoslovakia in Outline, and a booklet Britain and Czechoslovakia: A Study in Contacts published in Prague by Orbis (1966; second revised edition, 1968).

== Sources ==
- Robert John Weston Evans, "A Czech Historian in Troubled Times: J. V. Polišenský", Past & Present 176 (2002), pp. 257–274.
