= Resistance: The Underground War in Europe, 1939–1945 =

2022 book by Halik Kochanski

Resistance: The Underground War Against Hitler, 1939-1945
- First edition
- Author: Halik Kochanski
- Language: English
- Publisher: W. W. Norton & Company
- Publication date: 24 May 2022
- Publication place: United Kingdom
- Pages: 960
- ISBN: 978-1-324-09165-3

Resistance: The Underground War Against Hitler, 1939-1945 is a 2022 history book by Halik Kochanski. It is about the European resistance movements during World War II. It won the 2023 Wolfson History Prize.
