= Robert W. Scribner =

Australian historian (1941–1998)

- Born: 9 June 1941; Sydney, Australia
- Died: 29 January 1998 (aged 56); Arlington, Massachusetts, United States
- Occupations: Historian and academic
- Spouse: Lois Rutherford (m. 1989)
- Children: 2

Academic background
- Education: University of Sydney; School of Advanced Study
- Thesis: Reformation, Society and Humanism in Erfurt ca. 1450–ca. 1530 (1972)
- Doctoral advisor: A. G. Dickens

Academic work
- Discipline: History
- Sub-discipline: Reformation; Germany in the early modern period
- Institutions: Portsmouth Polytechnic; King's College London; Clare College, Cambridge; Harvard University
- Doctoral students: Lyndal Roper

Robert William Scribner (9 June 1941, in Sydney – 29 January 1998, in Arlington, Massachusetts) was an Australian historian who specialised in German Reformation history. He spent most of his career teaching at Clare College, Cambridge before being appointed to a chair at Harvard Divinity School two years before his death.

== Early life and education ==
Scribner was born in Sydney to a working-class Catholic family. His paternal grandparents were German immigrants to Australia while his maternal ones were Irish immigrants. His grandmother was chiefly responsible for his upbringing.

Scribner won a place to study history at the University of Sydney, where he held a teaching fellowship while completing graduate work. He earned a first-class master's degree in 1967, his thesis titled 'The Social Thought of Erasmus, 1489–1519'. He left Australia for Europe in 1968 as the country began to be drawn further into the Vietnam War, to which Scribner was resolutely opposed.

Scribner spent two years as a research student in Marburg and Freiberg, where he became proficient in German. He moved to the Institute of Historical Research in the University of London's School of Advanced Study to complete his PhD under A. G. Dickens, submitting it in 1972 with the title 'Reformation, Society and Humanism in Erfurt ca. 1450–ca. 1530'. He worked as a night porter to finance his studies and encountered significant difficulties in accessing archival material for his research, as Erfurt was then part of East Germany where access to archives was restricted for non-communists.

== Academic career ==
Scribner's first teaching assignment followed at the Portsmouth Polytechnic. From 1979 to 1981 he taught at King's College London. Scribner taught as a fellow at Clare College, Cambridge between 1981 and 1996, where he became one of the founders of early modern research, along with Patrick Collinson and Peter Burke. His influence within the history faculty was recognised with his appointment to a readership in the social history of early modern Europe in 1993, having already been awarded a prestigious two-year research readership by the British Academy. In 1996, he was appointed to the Department of Religious History within Harvard University's Divinity School. His main focus was the German-speaking Reformation. For academic teaching he translated many sources about the Peasants' War in Germany into English, concluding with The German Peasants' War. A history in documents (Humanities Press International, 1991).

== Personal life ==
Scribner married Robyn Dasey in 1972 and they later divorced. In 1989 he married Lois Rutherford, with whom he had one son and one daughter. Scribner died of esophageal cancer on 29 January 1998, having been diagnosed with it a few months after arriving at Harvard.

== Selected publications ==
- For the sake of simple folk. Popular propaganda for the German Reformation ( Cambridge studies in oral and literate culture. Bd. 2). Cambridge University Press, Cambridge 1981, ISBN 0-521-24192-8.
- Religion and culture in Germany (1400-1800). Leiden : Brill, 2001. 186504235; German edition: Religion und Kultur in Deutschland 1400-1800 (Veröffentlichungen des Max-Planck-Instituts für Geschichte. Bd. 175). Herausgegeben von Lyndal Roper. 2. Auflage, Vandenhoeck & Ruprecht, Göttingen 2006, ISBN 3-525-35171-2.
- The reformation in national context. Cambridge [u.a.] Cambridge Univ. Press 1998 833681692.
- The reformation in national context. Cambridge [u.a.] Cambridge Univ. Press 1998 833681692.
- Popular culture and popular movements in reformation Germany, London; Ronceverte, WV : Hambledon Press, 1988. 181822124.
- The German Reformation. London : Macmillan, 1986. OCLC 59093285.
- with Sheilagh Ogilvie. Germany: a new social and economic history. Volume 1, 1450–1630. London; New York; Sydney : A. Arnold, 1996. 468817585.
- with Sheilagh Ogilvie and R.J. Overy. Germany: a new social and economic history. London; New York: Arnold, 1996-2003. 602992252.
- with Trevor Johnson (co-eds.). Popular religion in Germany and Central Europe, 1400–1800. Basingstoke: St. Martin's Press, 1996. 59093285.
- with C. Scott Dixon, The German Reformation. Basingstoke, Hampshire; New York: Palgrave Macmillan, 2003. 52121514.
- with Lyndal Roper, Religion and culture in Germany (1400-1800), Leiden: Brill, 2001. 186504235.
- with Gerhard Benecke, The German Peasant War 1525. New Viewpoints. George Allen & Unwin, London u. a. 1979, ISBN 0-04-900031-4.
- with Ronnie Po-Chia Hsia. Problems in the historical anthropology of early modern Europe. (Wolfenbütteler Forschungen; Bd. 78.) Wiesbaden: Harrassowitz, 1997. ISBN 3-447-03987-6.
