= Halik (name) =

Halik or Halík may refer to the following people:

Given name

- Halik Kochanski, British historian and writer

Surname

- Karel Halík (1883–?), Czech wrestler
- Tomáš Halík (born 1948), Czech Roman Catholic priest, philosopher, theologian and scholar
- Tony Halik (1921–1998), Polish traveler and explorer
