= Bodleian Libraries =

Group of research libraries at the University of Oxford

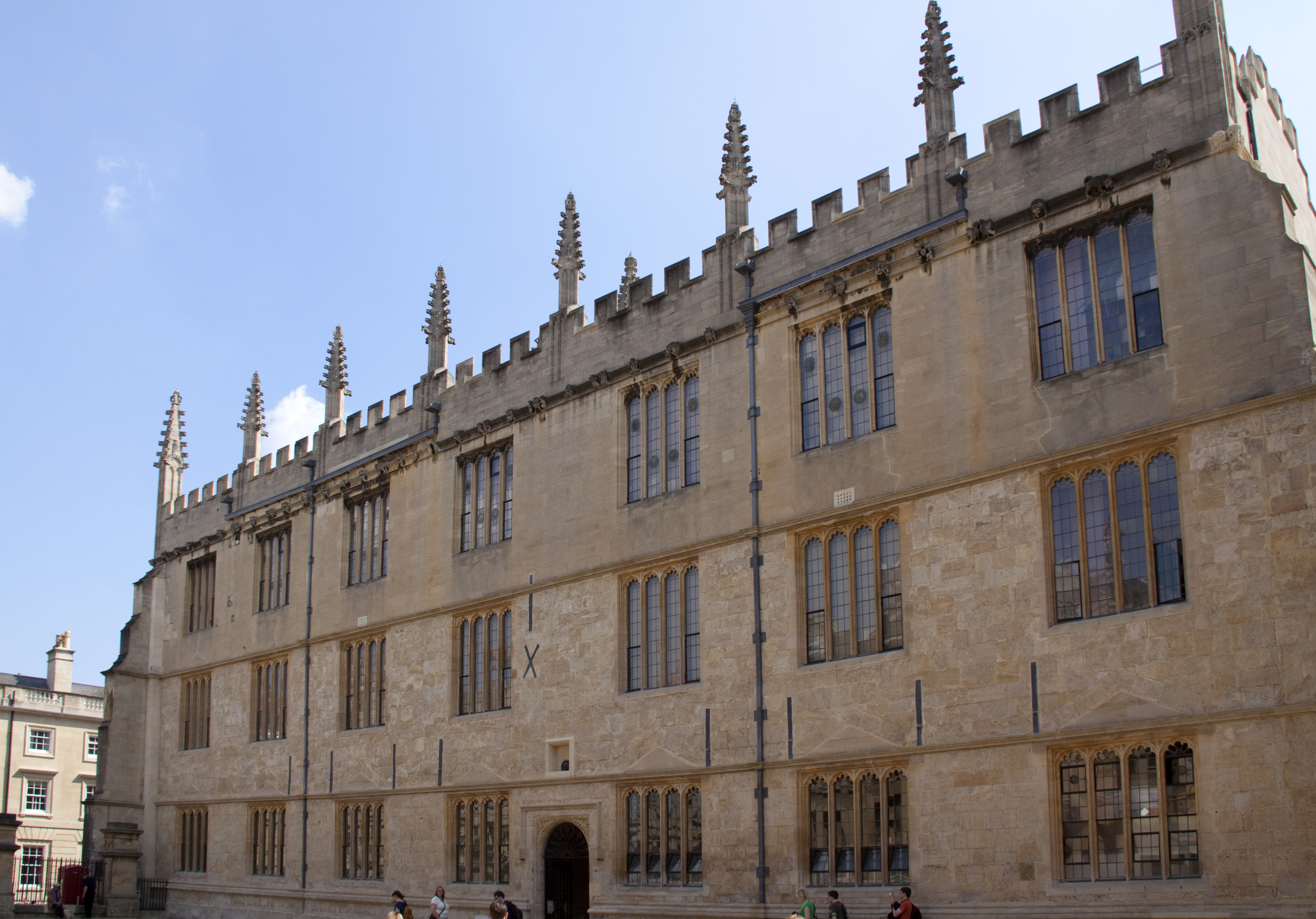
View of the main Bodleian Library building of the University of Oxford

The Bodleian Libraries are a collection of 28 libraries that serve the University of Oxford in England, including the Bodleian Library itself, as well as many other (but not all) central and faculty libraries. As of the 2021–2022 report year, the libraries collectively hold 13.5 million printed items, as well as numerous other objects and artefacts.

A major product of this collaboration has been a joint integrated library system, OLIS (Oxford Libraries Information System), and its public interface, SOLO (Search Oxford Libraries Online), which provides a union catalogue covering all member libraries, as well as the libraries of individual colleges and other faculty libraries, which are not members of the group but do share cataloguing information.

One of its busiest libraries is the Social Science Library, which, at its peak, serves 7,500 visitors in a period of approximately nine weeks.

== History ==
Founded in February 2000 as Oxford University Library Services (OULS), the organisation was renamed on 2 March 2010.

As of the 2021–2022 report year, the group cares for 13.5 million printed items, 28,293 metres (92,825 ft) of archives and manuscripts, and a staff of 541 (full-time equivalents). It is the second largest library in the UK (behind the British Library). The continued growth of the library has resulted in a severe shortage of storage space. More than 1.5 million items are stored outside Oxford. Locations formerly used included a redundant village church at Nuneham Courtenay and a disused salt mine in Cheshire.

In 2007 and 2008, in an effort to obtain better and more capacious storage facilities for the library's collections, Oxford University Library Services (OULS) tried to obtain planning permission to build a new book depository on the Osney Mead site, to the southwest of Oxford city centre. However, this application was unsuccessful and the new Book Storage Facility was instead constructed at a site on South Marston Industrial Estate on the outskirts of Swindon. This Book Storage Facility, which cost £26 million, opened in October 2010 and has 153 miles (246 kilometres) of shelving, including 3,224 bays with 95,000 shelf levels, and 600 map cabinets to hold 1.2 million maps and other items. Previously existing Osney Mead premises are used for backroom operations, including the Packing and Design Service department.

== Structure ==
The Bodleian Libraries group includes centralised departments:

- Academic and Learning Services (ALS)
- Scholarly Resources, which includes Bodleian Digital Library Systems and Services (BDLSS), Collections Management (Collections & Resource Description and Storage & Logistics)
- Communications
- Conservation and Collection Care

The current Director of the Libraries Richard Ovenden, like his predecessors Sarah Thomas and founding director Reginald Carr, holds the position concurrently with that of Bodley's Librarian since 2014. Senior administrative staff are based in the Clarendon Building on the central Bodleian estate.

== Libraries ==
As of August 2023, the website of the group lists the following member libraries:

- Bodleian Art, Archaeology and Ancient World Library
- Bodleian KB Chen China Centre Library
- Bodleian Education Library
- Bodleian Health Care Libraries (Cairns Library at John Radcliffe Hospital, Knowledge Centre at Old Road, Nuffield Orthopaedic Centre, Horton Library at Horton General Hospital, Banbury)
- Bodleian History Faculty Library, in Radcliffe Camera
- Bodleian Japanese Library
- Bodleian Latin American Centre Library
- Bodleian Law Library
- Bodleian Library (Old Library, Radcliffe Camera, Weston Library)
- Bodleian Music Faculty Library
- Bodleian Social Science Library
- English Faculty Library
- Leopold Muller Memorial Library (Jewish studies)
- Nizami Ganjavi Library
- Philosophy and Theology Faculties Library, in former Radcliffe Infirmary building
- Radcliffe Science Library (including the Alexander Library of Ornithology)
- Rewley House Continuing Education Library
- Sainsbury Library at the Saïd Business School
- Sherardian Library of Plant Taxonomy
- Taylor Institution Library (medieval, Slavonic and modern languages)
- Vere Harmsworth Library at the Rothermere American Institute

A further 40 college libraries and 20 faculty and speciality libraries are not members of the group.

== See also ==
- Bodleian Library
- Bodley Medal
- Book storage
- New Bodleian Library
- University of Oxford
- Weston Library
