= Richard Ovenden =

British librarian and author (born 1964)

Richard Ovenden OBE FSA FRSA
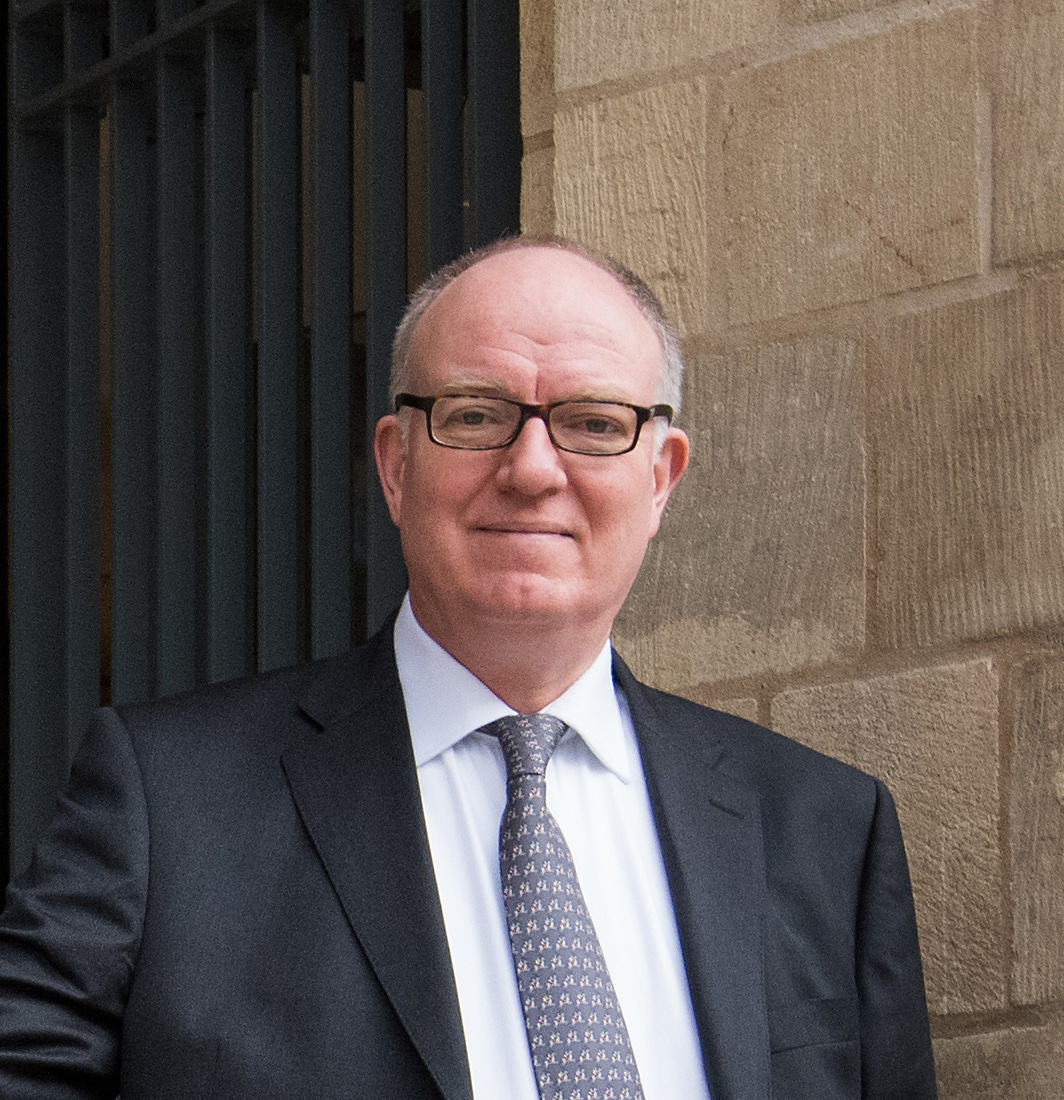
- Ovenden in 2015
- Born: 25 March 1964 (age 62)
- Education: Deal Parochial and Sir Roger Manwood's School, Kent; St Chad's College; University College London
- Occupations: Librarian and author
- Organizations: Bodleian Library

Richard Ovenden OBE FSA FRSA FRHistS (/ˈʌvəndən/; born 25 March 1964) is a British librarian and author. He currently serves as the 25th Bodley's Librarian in the University of Oxford, having been appointed in 2014. He is also the current head of the University of Oxford's Gardens, Libraries and Museums group. Ovenden also serves as the director of the Bodleian Library's Centre for the Study of the Book and holds a Professorial Fellowship at Balliol College. Ovenden is a trustee of the Chawton House Library and vice-chair of the Kraszna-Krausz Foundation. In 2009, he was elected third chair of the Digital Preservation Coalition, succeeding Ronald Milne and Dame Lynne Brindley in a post he held until 2013. and returning in 2015 to the honorary position of President of the DPC. He was elected to the American Philosophical Society in 2015. He is a Fellow of the Society of Antiquaries of London, having been elected in 2008.

== Early life ==
Richard Ovenden was educated at Deal Parochial and Sir Roger Manwood's School in Sandwich, Kent, St Chad's College, Durham University, culminating in studying library science to qualify as a librarian at University College London (UCL) in 1987.

== Career ==
Ovenden has worked at Durham University Library, the House of Lords Library, the National Library of Scotland and at the University of Edinburgh, where he was responsible for Collection Management within the Library, for Special Collections and Archives, and for the University Museums and Art Gallery.

In 2003, he became Keeper of Special Collections and Western Manuscripts at the Bodleian Libraries and in 2011 was appointed Deputy Librarian.

Ovenden is the author of John Thomson (1837–1921): photographer (1997), a study of the Scottish photographer, and has also written Burning the Books (John Murray), which was shortlisted for the 2021 Wolfson History Prize.

He was appointed Officer of the Order of the British Empire (OBE) in the 2019 Birthday Honours for services to libraries and archives.

== Works ==
=== Books edited ===
- Ovenden, Richard; McIlwaine, Catherine, eds. (2022). The Great Tales Never End: Essays in Memory of Christopher Tolkien. Bodleian Library Publishing. ISBN 978-1-8512-4565-9.
- Ovenden, Richard; Tolkien, Christopher, eds. (2025). The Bovadium Fragments: together with The Origin of Bovadium. HarperCollins. ISBN 978-0008737764.
