= Olwen Hufton =

British academic, educator and writer

Dame Olwen Hufton FBA FRHistS
- Born: 1938 (age 87–88); Oldham, Lancashire, England
- Occupations: Historian and academic
- Spouse: Brian Murphy (m. 1965)
- Children: 2 Caroline Murphy (academic) Clare Murphy

Academic background
- Education: Royal Holloway

Academic work
- Discipline: History
- Sub-discipline: Early modern Europe; Social history; Women's history; Cultural history
- Institutions: University of Leicester; University of Reading; Harvard University; European University Institute; Merton College, Oxford; Royal Holloway, University of London

Dame Olwen Hufton DBE FBA FRHistS (born 1938) is a British historian of early modern Europe and a pioneer of social history and of women's history. She is an expert on early modern, western European comparative socio-cultural history with special emphasis on gender, poverty, social relations, religion and work. Since 2006 she has been a part-time Professorial Research Fellow at Royal Holloway. She was diagnosed with Alzheimer's Disease in 2013 and now lives in a care home in North East London.

== Biography ==
Born in 1938 in Oldham, Lancashire to Joseph and Caroline Hufton, Olwen Hufton was awarded a scholarship at a local grammar school, and became the only council house child in her form. From there she went to University College London (UCL), where she encountered Alfred Cobban, the great revisionist historian of the French Revolution.

Hufton's academic career began as a lecturer at the University of Leicester from 1963 to 1966. From Leicester she moved to the University of Reading, where she taught for more than twenty years; and then to Harvard, where from 1987 to 1991 she was the university's first Professor of Modern History and Women's Studies. After four years in America, she returned to Europe in 1991 to become Professor of History and Civilisation at the European University Institute in Florence. Six years later, in 1997, she returned to Britain to become Leverhulme Professor of History at Oxford. She retired in 2003, and is now Fellow Emeritus of Merton College. In 2006 she joined Royal Holloway as a part-time Professorial Research Fellow in the History Department.

== Honours and recognition ==
Hufton is a Fellow of the British Academy (1998) and of the Royal Historical Society. She was made a Dame Commander of the Order of the British Empire (DBE) in 2004.

She holds honorary fellowships at UCL and Royal Holloway; and honorary degrees from Reading and Southampton. The University of Glasgow hosts a Hufton Postgraduate Reading Group centred on women's history.

In 2006, she was presented with a festschrift, edited by Ruth Harris and Lyndal Roper, and published by Oxford University Press, entitled The Art of Survival: Gender and History in Europe, 1450–2000.

== Personal life ==
Olwen Hufton married Brian Dermot Taunton Murphy (born 27 June 1934) on 3 July 1965; the couple has two daughters.

== Publications ==
- Bayeux in the Late Eighteenth Century. (Oxford, 1967)
- The Poor of Eighteenth-Century France (Oxford, 1974)
- Women and the Limits of Citizenship in the French Revolution (Toronto, 1992)
- The Prospect Before her: A History of Women in Western Europe, I: 1500-1800 (London, 1995)
- Europe: Privilege and Protest 1730-1789 (Oxford, 2000).
