= Hartmut Pogge von Strandmann =

German historian and academic (born 1938)

- Born: Hartmut Johann Otto Pogge von Strandmann; 1938 (age 87–88)

Academic background
- Education: University of Bonn; Humboldt University of Berlin; University of Hamburg; St Antony's College, Oxford
- Thesis: The Kolonialrat, its significance and influence on German politics from 1890 to 1906 (1970)

Academic work
- Discipline: History
- Sub-discipline: Political history; Intellectual history; History of Europe; German Empire
- Institutions: Balliol College, Oxford; University of Sussex; University College, Oxford

Hartmut Johann Otto Pogge von Strandmann (born 1938) is a German historian and academic, who was Professor of Modern History at the University of Oxford between 1996 and 2005.

== Career ==
Born in 1938, Pogge von Strandmann attended the University of Bonn, the Humboldt University of Berlin and the University of Hamburg, where he studied history, philosophy, geography, politics and economics. He completed the first part of examinations in 1962 and was then a senior scholar at St Antony's College, Oxford, between 1962 and 1966 and a junior research fellow at Balliol College, Oxford, between 1966 and 1970, completing a DPhil in 1970 with a thesis on Imperial Germany's Colonial Council.

Pogge von Strandmann was lecturer in modern European history at the University of Sussex from 1970 to 1977, when he returned to Oxford as a fellow at University College. He was awarded the title of Professor of Modern History by the University of Oxford in 1996, and retired in 2005. He has held visiting professorships at the University of Rostock (1991 and 1992), the University of Namibia (1993–95) and Washington and Lee University (2004). He was also the subject of a 2003 Festschrift edited by Geoff Eley and James Retallack: Wilhelminism and its Legacies: German Modernities, Imperialism, and the Meanings of Reform, 1890–1930: Essays for Hartmut Pogge von Strandmann (New York and Oxford: Berghahn Books, 2003).

== Publications ==
Pogge von Strandmann's research has focused on Wilhelmine Germany.

- (Editor) Walther Rathenau, Tagebuch 1907–1922 (Düsseldorf: Droste Verlag, 1967)
- "Domestic origins of Germany's colonial expansion under Bismarck", Past & Present, vol. 42 (1969), pp. 140–159.
- Unternchmenspolitik und Unternchmensfuhrung. Der Dialog zwischen Aufsichtsrat und Vorstand bei Mannesmann 1900 bis 1919 (Düsseldorf, 1978)
- (Editor with R. J. Bullen and A. B. Polonsky) Ideas into Politics: Aspects of European History, 1880–1950 (London: Croon Helm, 1984).
- (Editor) Walther Rathenau: Industrialist, Banker, Intellectual, and Politician: Notes and Diaries, 1907–1922 (Oxford: Oxford University Press, 1985).
- (with Robert J. W. Evans) The Coming of the First World War (Oxford: Oxford University Press, 1988).
- (Editor with Robert J. W. Evans) The Revolutions in Europe 1848–1849: From Reform to Reaction (Oxford: Oxford University Press, 2000)..
