= Laura Gowing =

Laura Gowing FBA is professor of women’s history and early modern history at King's College London. She received her PhD from Royal Holloway, London, supervised by Lyndal Roper, where she was subsequently a British Academy Postdoctoral Fellow. She lectured at the Universities of Hertfordshire and Essex before King’s, and is a member of the editorial collective of History Workshop Journal. Gowing was elected a Fellow of the British Academy in 2023.

== Research ==
Gowing's research relates to early modern England, women, gender, the body, sexuality, crime, and London. Much of her work uses legal records as a source for the history of sixteenth- and seventeenth-century women, with a particular focus on language and the body. Her first book Domestic Dangers revealed high numbers of London women litigating and testifying about sex and marriage, arguing for a 'language of insult' that defined women through sexual reputation, and demonstrating women’s authoritative use of the law. In Common Bodies (2003), Gowing recaptured the bodily experiences of ordinary women, critiquing the approaches of Thomas W. Laqueur and Michel Foucault to the history of the body in the early modern period in a book that was positively reviewed in The Guardian. Ingenious Trade (2021) investigates the working lives of craftswomen in later seventeenth-century London, with a particular focus on the needle trades, shop work, and young women in apprenticeships. Gowing has also edited two collections of largely archival primary source material, and written about queer history and public memory.

== Awards ==
Domestic Dangers was awarded the Best Book of 1996 prize by the Society for the Study of Early Modern Women and shortlisted for the Longman/History Today prize; Common Bodies was awarded the Joan Kelly Memorial Prize by the American Historical Association; Ingenious Trade, written with the support of a Leverhulme Research Fellowship, won the Society for Social History book prize.

== Selected publications ==
- Ingenious Trade, Cambridge University Press, 2021.
- "The manner of submission: gender and demeanour in 17th century London", Cultural and Social History 10:1 (2013).
- Gender Relations in Early Modern England, (Pearson Longman, 2012, 2nd edition 2022)
- "Women’s bodies and the making of sex in seventeenth-century England", Signs: Journal of Women in Culture and Society 37: 4 (2012), pp. 813–822. ISSN 0097-9740.
- "The politics of women's friendship in early modern England", in Gowing, Hunter and Rubin (eds), 2005, Love, Friendship and Faith in Europe 1300-1800, pp. 131–149 [Chapter].
- Common bodies : women, touch and power in seventeenth-century England. New Haven, Conn.; London: Yale University Press, 2003.
- Women's Worlds in Seventeenth-Century England, edited with Patricia Crawford. London: Routledge, 1999
- Domestic Dangers: Women, Words, and Sex in Early Modern London. Oxford: Oxford University Press, 1996.
