= Britons: Forging the Nation 1707–1837 =

1992 book by Linda Colley

- 3rd edition cover
- Author: Linda Colley
- Language: English
- Subject: British History, Nationalism
- Genre: Academic History
- Publisher: Yale University Press
- Publication date: 1992, 1994 (paperback), 2005, 2009 (revised)
- Publication place: United States
- Pages: xxxi, 442, illus.
- ISBN: 978-0-300-15280-7
- Dewey Decimal: 941.07 C
- LC Class: DA485.C65 2009

Britons: Forging the Nation 1707–1837 is a history written in 1992 by Linda Colley. Britons charts the emergence of British national identity from the Act of Union in 1707 with Scotland and England to the beginning of the Victorian era in 1837. British identity, she argues, was created from four features that both united the Britons and set the nation apart from others:

1. Britain is a Protestant state defined against a largely Catholic Europe;
2. it is an island nation with a strong navy rather than a massive army;
3. it is a metropole;
4. it is a direct rival to France.

Colley's analysis of the source of British identity in the nineteenth and twentieth centuries led her to wonder whether British identity will survive in the future, now that so much of what made the Britons British – religion, Empire, disaffiliation from the Continent – has been lost. Britons won the Wolfson History Prize in 1992.

== Synopsis ==
Britons begins with the period after the Acts of Union 1707, when the diverse peoples of Britain developed a sense of “Britishness” based largely on their perceived differences from other Europeans. A common commitment to Protestantism provided Britons with a unifying history and a constant enemy in Catholic France for over a century, reinforced by the growth of British trade and mercantilism. Colley contends that the Jacobite insurrection of 1745 against the Hanoverian government was unsuccessful because the twin forces of Protestantism and the financial interests of the merchant class motivated Britons to stand firmly against a Catholic Stuart uprising and the economic destabilization it would bring.

British unity was shaken after the overwhelming success of the Seven Years' War, which left Britain with a huge foreign empire to rule, turning Britain into a military power and forcing her citizens to re-examine their definition of Britishness and empire. Losing the American Revolutionary War made the country more patriotic and set the ideas of monarchy, military, and empire at the center of British identity. George III was more attentive to the royal image than his predecessors and came to be loved by his people. Total war with Napoleonic France provided women an opportunity to carve out their own niche, however small, for themselves in the public sphere, working in support of the war effort and the royal family.

Just as war transformed women's participation in public and political life, so too did it lead to increased political power for men because the government needed mass military participation during the Revolutionary and Napoleonic Wars. During the 1830s, the unity of the British nation was challenged by three reform crises: the expansion of the rights of Catholic citizens, the movement for parliamentary reform, and the abolition of slavery. These reform efforts gave a great number of Britons their first opportunities to engage directly in the political life of the nation; the majority of British subjects were still not citizens, however, but subjects, calling into question the degree to which Britain was a nation of Britons.' Britons closes by taking note of debates over British identity today, especially with regard to the European Union, and the influences that originally bonded Britons are now largely gone, leading to a resurgence of English, Scottish, and Welsh identity.

== Methodology ==
Colley's methodology focuses more on the cultural and social history of Britain than on political history in order to explain what being British meant to the Britons themselves. She draws heavily on visual sources – such as paintings, political cartoons, and even military uniforms – in order to reconstruct the formation of British identity. While Britons is a thematic rather than narrative history, the book follows a rough chronology and employs illustrative anecdotes throughout.

== Reactions ==
Britons has been highly praised both for its argument and the style in which it was written. One critic called it "dashingly written and firmly unsentimental".

Some questions have been raised about the comprehensiveness of the work, specifically its lack of mention of the Irish and Jewish diasporas in Britain.

Some recent studies of the formation of British identity have criticised Colley's approach for being insensitive to why different groups adopted 'Britishness', and what it meant to them. For example, Colin Kidd has argued that Protestantism was in fact a divisive issue for the Scottish and that 'Britain' was adopted primarily as a way to adopt English constitutional liberties.

A critical review was also given by Gerald Newman, who pointed out that many of Colley's citations were misleading, claiming supportive evidence when in fact there was none. For a more recent and balanced assessment, see Theodore Koditschek, "The Making of British Nationality", Victorian Studies, 3, (2002).
