= Frances Harris =

British historian (1950–2021)

- Photo of Harris
- Born: Frances Marjorie Harris; 8 January 1950; Victoria, Australia
- Died: 17 February 2021 (aged 71); London, England

Frances Harris (8 January 1950–17 February 2021), was a British historian known for her focus on the Stuart period.

== Biography ==
Frances Harris was born in Victoria, Australia to the commercial artist Esther Hall and Laurence Harris, a civil servant. Harris was educated in Methodist Ladies' College, Melbourne. Her father's job took the family to Britain in 1967 and Harris remained to attend Westfield College, London University where she graduated with a degree in English in 1971. Harris completed her PhD in 1975. She followed up the doctorate with a diploma in library and information studies through University College London. Harris then took up a position in the British Library. Harris wrote three books on the Stuart period beginning in 1991. In 2004 Harris's second book won a Wolfson History Prize. When Harris retired in 2010 she was the head of modern historical manuscripts.

== Private life ==
Harris was in a civil partnership with Elfrida Roberts. She was diagnosed with a myeloma in December 2020 and died on 17 February 2021.

== Bibliography ==
- A Passion for Government: The Life of Sarah, Duchess of Marlborough, 1991
- Transformations of Love:The Friendship of John Evelyn and Margaret Godolphin, 2003
- The General in Winter:The Marlborough-Godolphin Friendship and the Reign of Anne, 2017
