= Sasha Handley =

British historian

- Occupations: Professor of early modern history, University of Manchester

Academic background
- Education: Warwick University

Sasha Handley is a British historian, specializing in the early modern social and cultural history of the British Isles. She is best known for her research on history of British sleeping habits, and her book, Sleep in Early Modern England, was shortlisted for the Wolfson History Prize in 2017.

== Education and career ==
Handley completed her graduate education - a Bachelor's, Master's and Ph.D. - in history, from Warwick University. She is currently a professor of early modern history at the University of Manchester, where she teaches early modern British, European, and global history. She has received fellowships from the British Academy, the Arts and Humanities Research Council, and the Institute of Historical Research. She is a member of the Royal Historical Society, and chairs a collaborative seminar in early modern history with historians across Great Britain.

== Research and publications ==
Handley's research studies early modern social and cultural history in the British Isles, with a particular focus on healthcare and sleep, supernatural beliefs, emotions, and material culture. In 2016, Handley published Sleep in Early Modern England (Yale University Press), a book documenting social practices and medical research into sleep in early modern England. The book was shortlisted for the Wolfson History Prize in 2017, with the judges describing it as a "... book of sheer originality and novelty" that tackled a subject previously neglected in research. It was also shortlisted for the Longman-History Today Book Prize in 2017. In 2018, the book won the inaugural Social History Prize awarded by the Social History Society. Other research by Handley has addressed histories of the supernatural in Europe and England.

Handley has also collaborated with the National Trust to engage the public with research on the history of sleep, including guiding tours at Ham House, a 17th-century historical preserved home, to teach visitors about historical sleep habits and practices, and is collaborating on a similar project at Little Moreton Hall. As a visiting fellow at the Victoria and Albert Museum, Handley has also worked on the cataloging of early modern objects such as bedsheets. Handley has also contributed to programming on BBC Radio 4, concerning sheets and sleeping on a podcast titled 'The History of Stuff' and on the history of sleep, for a podcast hosted by Sarah Dunant, titled, 'Sleep: A Third of Human History'.
