= R. J. W. Evans =

British historian (born 1943)

R. J. W. Evans FBA FLSW
- Born: Robert John Weston Evans; 7 October 1943 (age 83)

Academic background
- Education: Jesus College, Cambridge

Academic work
- Discipline: History
- Sub-discipline: Early-modern European history
- Institutions: Oriel College, Oxford

Robert John Weston Evans FBA FLSW (born 7 October 1943) is a British historian, whose speciality is the post-medieval history of Central and Eastern Europe.

He was educated at Dean Close School, Cheltenham, and later at Jesus College, Cambridge.

== Career ==
Evans was Regius Professor of Modern History in the University of Oxford from 1997 to 2011 and is a Fellow of Oriel College, Oxford.

He works on the post-medieval history of Central and Eastern Europe, especially concerning that of the Habsburg lands from 1526 to 1918.

He has a particular interest in the role of language in historical development.

His main current research is on a history of Hungary from 1740 to 1945. He also studies the history of Wales and is the President of Cymdeithas Dafydd ap Gwilym, the Oxford University Welsh language society. He is a Founding Fellow of the Learned Society of Wales and is a member of its inaugural council.

Evans received an Honorary Silver Medal of Jan Masaryk at the Czech Republic Ambassador's residence in London in November 2019.

== Bibliography ==
- Rudolf II and his World: A Study in Intellectual History, 1576–1612 (Oxford, 1973)
- The Making of the Habsburg Monarchy, 1550–1700: An Interpretation (Oxford, 1979)
- The Coming of the First World War, ed. Robert Evans and Hartmut Pogge von Strandmann (Oxford, 1988)
- 'Maria Theresa and Hungary', and 'Joseph II and Nationality in the Habsburg Lands', in Enlightened Absolutism: Reform and Reformers in Later Eighteenth-Century Europe, ed. H. M. Scott (Houndmills, 1991), pp. 189–207 and 209–19.
- Crown, Church and Estates: Central European Politics in the Sixteenth and Seventeenth Centuries, ed. Robert Evans and T. V. Thomas (London, 1991)
- 'Language and Society in the Nineteenth Century: Some Central European Comparisons', in Language and Community in the Nineteenth Century, ed. Geraint H. Jenkins (Cardiff, 1999).
- 'Széchenyi and Austria', in History and Biography: Essays in Honour of Derek Beals, ed. T. C. W. Blanning and David Cannadine (Cambridge, 2002), pp. 113–141. '1848 in Mitteleuropa: Ereignis und Erinnerung', in 1848: Ereignis und Erinnerung in den politischen Kulturen Mitteleuropas, ed. Barbara Haider and Hans Peter Hye (Vienna, 2003), pp. 31–55.
- Great Britain and Central Europe, 1867–1914, ed. Robert Evans, Dusan Kovac and Edita Ivanickova (Bratislava, 2003)
- Curiosity and Wonder from the Renaissance to the Enlightenment, ed. Robert Evans and Alexander Marr (Aldershot, 2006)
- Austria, Hungary and the Habsburgs: Essays on Central Europe, c.1683–1867 (Oxford, 2006)

== Publications ==
- 'The Significance of the White Mountain for the Culture of the Czech Lands', Historical Research, 44 (1971), pp. 34–54.
- 'Humanism and Counter-Revolution at the Central European Universities', History of Education, 3: 2 (1974), pp. 1–15.
- 'Learned Societies in Germany in the Seventeenth Century', European History Review, 7 (1977), pp. 129–51.
- 'Rantzau and Welzer: Aspects of later German humanism', History of European Ideas, 5: 3 (1984), pp. 257–72.
- 'Culture and Anarchy in the Empire, 1540–1680', Central European History, 18: 1 (Mar. 1985), pp. 14–30.
- 'The Habsburgs and the Hungarian Problem, 1790–1848', Transactions of the Royal Historical Society, 5th ser., vol. 39 (1989), pp. 41–62.
- 'Essay and Reflection: Frontiers and national identities in Central Europe', The International History Review, 14: 3 (Aug. 1992), pp. 480–502.
- The language of history and the history of language: an inaugural lecture delivered before the University of Oxford on 11 May 1998 (Oxford, 1998) 34pp.
- 'Liberalism, Nationalism, and the Coming of the Revolution', and '1848 in the Habsburg Monarchy', in The Revolutions in Europe, 1848-9: From Reform to Reaction, ed. Robert Evans and Hartmut Pogge von Strandmann (Oxford, 2000), pp. 9–26, 181–206.
- Wales in European Context. Some Historical Reflections (Aberystwyth, 2001), 31pp.
- Great Britain and East-Central Europe, 1908–48. A Study in Perceptions (London, 2002), 31pp.
- 'A Czech Historian in Troubled Times: J. V. Polišenský', Past & Present, 176: 1 (2002), pp. 257–74.
- 'Kossuth and Štúr: Two national heroes', in Lajos Kossuth Sent Word..., ed. László Péter, Martyn Rady and Peter Sherwood (London, 2003), pp. 119–34.
- 'Language and State-building: The Case of the Habsburg Monarchy', Austrian History Yearbook, vol. xxxv (2004), pp. 1–24.
- 'The Making of October Fifteenth: C.A. Macartney and his Correspondents', in British-Hungarian Relations since 1848, ed. Laszlo Peter and Martyn Rady (London, 2004), pp. 259–70.
- '"The Manuscripts": The culture of politics and forgery in Central Europe', in A Rattleskull Genius: The many faces of Iolo Morganwg, ed. Geraint H. Jenkins (Cardiff, 2005), pp. 51–68.
- 'Europa in der britischen Historiographie', in Nationale Geschichtskulturen. Bilanz, Ausstrahlung, Europabezogenheit (Mainz/Stuttgart, 2006), pp. 77–93.
- 'Coming to Terms with the Habsburgs: Reflections on the historiography of Central Europe', in Does Central Europe Still Exist? History, economy, identity, ed. Thomas Row (Vienna, 2006), pp. 11–24.
- Czechoslovakia in a Nationalist and Fascist Europe 1918–1948. Proceedings of the British Academy no. 140. Ed. Robert Evans and Mark Cornwall (Oxford, 2007)
- 'The Successor States', in Twisted Paths: Europe 1914–1945, ed. Robert Gerwarth (Oxford, 2007), pp. 210–36.
- 'The Politics of Language and the Languages of Politics: Latin and the vernaculars in eighteenth-century Hungary', in Cultures of Power in Europe during the Long Eighteenth Century, ed. Hamish Scott and Brendan Simms (Cambridge, 2007), pp. 200–24.
- 'The Limits of Loyalty', in The Limits of Loyalty: Imperial symbolism, popular allegiances, and state patriotism in the late Habsburg Monarchy, ed. Laurence Cole and Daniel Unowsky (New York, 2007), pp. 223–32.
- 'Communicating Empire: The Habsburgs and their critics, 1700–1919 (The Prothero Lecture)', Proceedings of the Royal Historical Society, 19 (2009), pp. 117–38.
- 'The Creighton Century: British historians and Europe', Historical Research, 82, no. 216 (2009), pp. 320–39.
- 'Afterword', in Re-Contextualising East Central European History: Nation, culture and minority groups, ed. Robert Pyrah and Marius Turda (Leeds, 2010), pp. 155–8.
- Wales and the Wider World: Welsh history in an international context, ed. T.M. Charles-Edwards and Robert Evans (Donington, 2010)
- The Uses of the Middle Ages in Modern European States, ed. Robert Evans and Guy P. Marchal (Basingstoke, 2010)
- The Holy Roman Empire 1495–1806, ed. Robert Evans, Michael Schaich, and Peter H. Wilson (Oxford, 2011)
- 'Confession and Nation in Early Modern Central Europe', Central Europe, 9, no. 1 (May 2011), pp. 2–17.
- 'Official Languages: A brief prehistory', in Language and History, Linguistics and Historiography, ed. Nils Langer, Steffan Davies, and Wim Vandenbussche (Oxford, 2011), pp. 129–46.
- 'National Historiography, 1850-1950: The European Context', in Writing a Small Nation's Past: Wales in comparative perspective, 1850-1950, ed. Neil Evans and Huw Pryce (Farnham, 2013), pp. 31–48.
- "Center on the Margins" (review of Omer Bartov, Tales from the Borderlands: Making and Unmaking of the Galician Past, Yale University Press, 2024, 376 pp.), The New York Review of Books, vol. LXXI, no. 20 (19 December 2024), pp. 74, 80–81. "I follow Bartov here in using the Polish version of the name, [Buczacz,] since the town [now Buchach, Ukraine] has lain for most of its history in Poland or a region dominated by Polish culture. [p. 74.] [B]efore the Great War [p]laces like Buczacz were incubators of both Polish and Ukrainian nationalism, and eventually of its Jewish forms too, as Zionism.... Early Zionists enjoyed little local support either within the Jewish community or outside it. [Ukrainian socialist, nationalist, writer, translator, economist, ethnographer] [Ivan] Franko portrayed them with characteristically slight sympathy at the time, though he applauded their plans to emigrate. Bartov accords them little attention here.... [Footnote 6:] He explains the appeal of the movement more clearly in Anatomy of a Genocide.... For many Poles too the eastern homelands – what they came to call the Kresy – were a continuing locus for the dreams of benevolent hegemony in the region, which after 1918 underpinned the unsustainable claims of the Second [Polish] Republic." (p. 80.)

Academic offices
Preceded by John Elliott	Regius Professor of History at the University of Oxford; 1997–2011	Succeeded by Lyndal Roper
Awards
Preceded by Richard Cobb	Wolfson History Prize; 1980; With: F. S. L. Lyons	Succeeded by J. W. Burrow
Preceded by Quentin Skinner	Wolfson History Prize; 1980; With: F. S. L. Lyons	Succeeded by J. W. Burrow
Preceded by The Lady Soames	Wolfson History Prize; 1980; With: F. S. L. Lyons	Succeeded by J. W. Burrow
