= Alex von Tunzelmann =

British historian (born 1977)

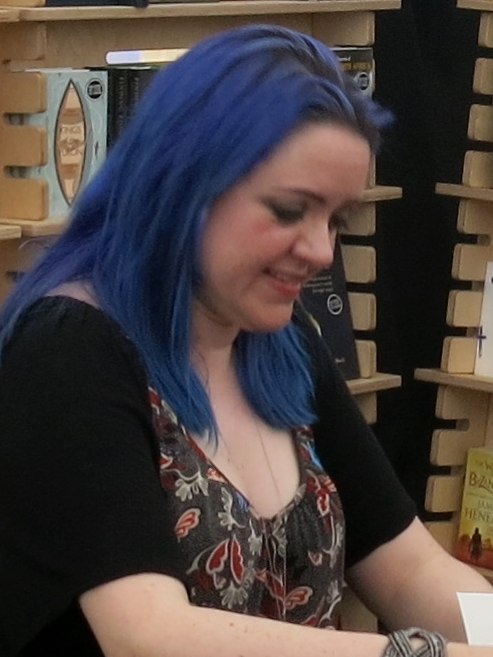
- Tunzelmann in 2018
- Born: 1977 (age 48–49); United Kingdom
- Education: Brighton and Hove High School
- Alma mater: University College, Oxford
- Occupations: Historian; screenwriter; author; newspaper columnist; podcaster
- Relatives: Nicholas von Tunzelmann; Alexander von Tunzelmann; Adrienne von Tunzelmann
- Writing career
- Genre: Non-fiction
- Subjects: Cold War; British Empire

Alex von Tunzelmann (born December 1977) is a British popular historian, author, newspaper columnist, podcaster and screenwriter.

== Early life and education ==
According to Tunzelmann, her family originated in Saxony, migrating to Livonia (present-day Estonia) around 1600 and to New Zealand around 1850.

Tunzelmann was educated at Brighton and Hove High School, an independent school for girls in Brighton, and at University College, Oxford. She read history and edited both Cherwell and Isis.

== Career ==
=== Columnist ===
From 2008 to 2016, Tunzelmann wrote a column for The Guardian entitled "Reel history", in which she discussed and rated popular films for their historical accuracy. She has also written for The New York Times, Los Angeles Times, The Washington Post, The Daily Telegraph, Conde Nast Traveller, the BBC News website, the Financial Times and The Daily Beast.

=== Author ===
Tunzelmann has written five non fiction popular history books

- Indian Summer: The Secret History of the End of an Empire, 2007, her first book, details the independence of India in 1947 and the process leading up to it, as well as the consequences after independence.
- Red Heat. Conspiracy, Murder, and the Cold War in the Caribbean, 2011, covers the relationship of the United States with Cuba, the Dominican Republic, and Haiti during the time of the Cold War. Her overall framework is based on the idea that the Cold War was not a static phenomenon but instead dynamic and involved 'hot wars' as well.
- Reel History: The World According to the Movies, 2015, a humorous look at the history of the world as told through the movies, expanding on her long-running column for the Guardian.
- Blood and Sand: Suez, Hungary, and Eisenhower's Campaign for Peace, 2016, about the Suez Crisis of 1956.
- Fallen Idols: Twelve Statues That Made History, 2021, an exploration of the stories of twelve statues or groups of statues of historical figures that later became contentious, prompted by the removal or defacement of statues during the George Floyd protests of 2020.

She collaborated with Jeremy Paxman on his books The Political Animal and On Royalty. She also contributed to The Truth About Markets by John Kay, Does Education Matter? by Alison Wolf, and Not on the Label by Felicity Lawrence.

=== Podcasting and broadcasting ===
Tunzelmann is the alternating co-host of the British newspaper review podcast Paper Cuts. For BBC Radio 4, she wrote and presented the series The Lucan Obsession series of The History Podcast and also wrote the series History's Secret Heroes.

She appears regularly on Sky News and on BBC current affairs programmes.

In May 2025, she appeared on the BBC Radio 4 podcast Great Lives, where a distinguished guest is asked to nominate the person they feel is truly deserving of the title "Great Life", and chose Ned Ludd.

=== Screenwriting ===
Tunzelmann wrote the script for the 2017 movie Churchill, a film that received mixed reviews. Churchillian biographer Andrew Roberts noted the irony that, "Ms. von Tunzelmann—who once had a column in The Guardian that attacked movies for their historical errors—has twisted the truth about Churchill." Matthew Norman in the Evening Standard acknowledged that despite the film's "fancifulness", it was "an interesting and original study of a magnificent but unsaintly man raging in the dark against the dying of the light."

She also wrote episodes of the RAI period drama Medici, focusing on the powerful Florentine family.

=== Awards ===
Tunzelmann was recognized by the Financial Times as Young Business Writer of the Year, and was shortlisted for the 2022 Wolfson History Prize for Fallen Idols.
