= John Brewer (historian) =

British–American historian (born 1947)

- Born: 22 March 1947 (age 79); Liverpool, England
- Occupation: Historian
- Title: Eli and Edythe Broad Professor of Humanities and Social Sciences, Emeritus
- Awards: Wolfson History Prize (1998)

Academic background
- Education: Sidney Sussex College, Cambridge

Academic work
- Discipline: History
- Sub-discipline: Eighteenth-century British history, cultural history
- Institutions: University of Cambridge; Yale University; Harvard University; University of California, Los Angeles; European University Institute; University of Chicago; California Institute of Technology
- Notable works: The Sinews of Power (1989); The Pleasures of the Imagination (1997)

John Brewer (born 22 March 1947) is a British and American historian of eighteenth-century Britain, known for his work on the English state, on consumption and culture, and on the history of the emotions. He is the Eli and Edythe Broad Professor of Humanities and Social Sciences, emeritus, at the California Institute of Technology (Caltech), and a faculty associate of the Harvard University history department. His book The Pleasures of the Imagination (1997) won the Wolfson History Prize in 1998.

== Early life and education ==
Brewer was born in Liverpool on 22 March 1947. He studied history at Sidney Sussex College, Cambridge, graduating with first-class honours in 1968, and completed a PhD at the University of Cambridge in 1973 with a dissertation on political argument and propaganda in England in the 1760s. He held a research fellowship at Sidney Sussex College from 1969 to 1973.

== Academic career ==
Brewer began his teaching career at Cambridge, where he was an assistant lecturer in history and a college lecturer at Corpus Christi College, Cambridge (1973–1976). He moved to the United States as an associate professor of history at Yale University (1976–1980), and then to Harvard University, where he was Professor of History and of History and Literature from 1980 to 1987 and chaired the interdisciplinary History and Literature program.

From 1987 to 1993 he was Professor of History at the University of California, Los Angeles, where he also served as director of the William Andrews Clark Memorial Library and of the Center for 17th- and 18th-Century Studies. He was Professor of History at the European University Institute in Florence from 1993 to 1999, chairing its department of history and civilisation. From 1999 to 2002 he was the John and Marion Sullivan University Professor in English and History at the University of Chicago.

Brewer joined Caltech in 2002 and was appointed the Eli and Edythe Broad Professor of Humanities and Social Sciences, a post he held until 2017. Since 2017 he has been a visiting faculty associate in the Harvard history department. He has held visiting positions and fellowships at institutions including the École des hautes études en sciences sociales in Paris, the Institute of Advanced Study at Durham University, and universities in Munich, Pittsburgh and elsewhere.

== Work ==
Brewer's books and articles have been translated into seven languages other than English: French, German, Italian, Portuguese, Spanish, Chinese and Japanese.

=== The English state ===
Brewer's The Sinews of Power: War, Money and the English State, 1688–1783 (1989) examined how, after the Glorious Revolution, the English state developed an unusually powerful capacity to wage war through taxation, public credit and a professional bureaucracy. The book is credited with popularising the concept of the "fiscal-military state", which has since become widely used and debated among historians of eighteenth-century Britain. On publication it was reviewed by the historian Roy Porter in New Statesman & Society, and it was translated into Japanese.

=== Consumption and culture ===
Much of Brewer's work concerns the growth of a commercial culture and a consuming public in early modern Britain. He was a co-author, with Neil McKendrick and J. H. Plumb, of The Birth of a Consumer Society (1982), and he co-edited several collections on consumption and material culture, including Consumption and the World of Goods (1993, with Roy Porter) and The Consumption of Culture, 1600–1800 (1995, with Ann Bermingham), both reviewed in History Today.

His The Pleasures of the Imagination: English Culture in the Eighteenth Century (1997) is a large-scale study of the emergence of English "high culture"—literature, painting, music and theatre—and of the publishers, dealers, impresarios and critics who brought it to a growing public. The book won the Wolfson History Prize in 1998 and was a nominee for the National Book Critics Circle Award in criticism; it was reviewed in outlets including The Wall Street Journal.

=== Microhistory, art and the history of feeling ===
Brewer has written several shorter, narrative-driven books that combine history with art history and literary study. A Sentimental Murder: Love and Madness in the Eighteenth Century (2004) reconstructs an eighteenth-century killing and its afterlife; it was reviewed by Jonathan Yardley in The Washington Post and by Jane Ridley in The Spectator. The American Leonardo: A Tale of Obsession, Art and Money (2009), set largely in the United States and Europe, follows a twentieth-century dispute over the attribution of a painting said to be by Leonardo da Vinci. He delivered the Ford Lectures at the University of Oxford in 2009, on "The Politics of Feeling in the Age of Revolutions".

=== Volcanic ===
Brewer's Volcanic: Vesuvius in the Age of Revolutions (Yale University Press, 2023) is a cultural history of Mount Vesuvius and the Bay of Naples in the age of the Enlightenment and Romanticism, tracing scientific enquiry, tourism and the volcano's role as a political and aesthetic symbol. It was his first book centred on Italy and his first to engage the history of science. The book was widely reviewed on both sides of the Atlantic, including in The New York Review of Books, the Financial Times, The Wall Street Journal, the Times Literary Supplement and the Literary Review.

== Awards and honours ==
- Wolfson History Prize, 1998, for The Pleasures of the Imagination
- National Book Critics Circle Award nominee in criticism, 1998
- Guggenheim Fellowship, 1992–93
- J. Paul Getty Fellowship, 1991–92
- Ford Lecturer, University of Oxford, 2009
- Moore Distinguished Visitor, Caltech, 2001
- National Endowment for the Humanities three-year interpretive research grant, "Culture and Consumption in the 17th and 18th Centuries", 1988–91
- Mellon Foundation grants in the humanities (three years each), 2004–07 and 2008–11, co-directed with Jed Buchwald and Mordechai Feingold

== Selected publications ==
=== Books ===
- Party Ideology and Popular Politics at the Accession of George III (Cambridge University Press, 1976)
- with Neil McKendrick and J. H. Plumb, The Birth of a Consumer Society (Europa, 1982)
- The Sinews of Power: War, Money and the English State, 1688–1783 (Knopf / Unwin Hyman, 1989)
- The Pleasures of the Imagination: English Culture in the Eighteenth Century (HarperCollins / Farrar, Straus and Giroux, 1997)
- A Sentimental Murder: Love and Madness in the Eighteenth Century (HarperCollins / Farrar, Straus and Giroux, 2004)
- The American Leonardo: A Tale of Obsession, Art and Money (Constable / Oxford University Press, 2009)
- Volcanic: Vesuvius in the Age of Revolutions (Yale University Press, 2023)

=== Edited volumes ===
- with John Styles (eds.), An Ungovernable People: The English and Their Law in the Seventeenth and Eighteenth Centuries (Hutchinson, 1980)
- with Roy Porter (eds.), Consumption and the World of Goods (Routledge, 1993)
- with Susan Staves (eds.), Early Modern Conceptions of Property (Routledge, 1995)
- with Ann Bermingham (eds.), The Consumption of Culture: Word, Image, and Object in the Seventeenth and Eighteenth Centuries (Routledge, 1995)
- with Eckhart Hellmuth (eds.), Rethinking Leviathan: The State in the Eighteenth Century (Oxford University Press, 1999)
