= Christopher de Hamel =

British librarian and specialist in medieval manuscripts (born 1950)

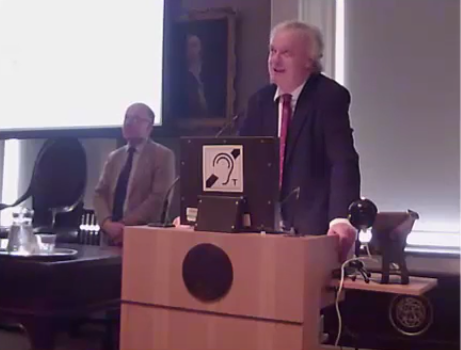
Christopher de Hamel delivers a public lecture on "The Library of Saint Thomas Becket" at Burlington House, Society of Antiquaries of London, 6 June 2017

Christopher Francis Rivers de Hamel FSA FRHistS (born 20 November 1950) is a British academic librarian and expert on mediaeval manuscripts. He is a Fellow of Corpus Christi College, Cambridge, and former Fellow Librarian of the Parker Library. His book Meetings with Remarkable Manuscripts is the winner of the Duff Cooper Prize for 2016 and the Wolfson History Prize for 2017.

== Early life and education ==
Christopher de Hamel was born on 20 November 1950 in London, England. His mother was the New Zealand children's book writer Joan de Hamel, and his father, Francis de Hamel, a physician. At the age of four he moved with his parents to New Zealand, where he was educated at King's High School, Dunedin, and graduated with an honours degree in history from the University of Otago.

He was subsequently awarded a Doctor of Philosophy (DPhil) degree by Oxford University for his research on 12th-century Bible commentaries. His thesis was titled "The production and circulation of glossed books of the Bible in the twelfth and early thirteenth centuries". He has been awarded honorary Doctorates of Letters from the University of Otago and from St. John's University, Minnesota.

== Career ==
Between 1975 and 2000 de Hamel worked for Sotheby's in its Western Manuscripts Department. He was elected as the Donnelley Fellow Librarian of Corpus Christi College, Cambridge in 2000, and elected a member of the Roxburghe Club the following year.

He held the 2003–2004 Sandars Readership in Bibliography. He delivered the 2009 Lyell Lectures at Oxford University on the subject of "Fragments in Book Bindings". In 2017, his then-newly-published Meetings with Remarkable Manuscripts was shortlisted for Waterstones Book of the Year 2016, and won both the £40,000 Wolfson History Prize and the Duff Cooper Prize.

== Published works ==
De Hamel has written a number of historical works within his field of expertise:

- Geoffrey Chaucer – Prologue to the Canterbury Tales – A Hitherto Unrecorded Variant Reading (Privately printed, 1980)
- A History of Illuminated Manuscripts (Phaidon, 1986; second revised edition, 1994)
- Syon Abbey: The Library of the Bridgettine Nuns and Their Peregrinations After the Reformation (Roxburghe Club, 1991)
- Scribes and Illuminators (British Museum, 1992)
- The Book: A History of the Bible (Phaidon, 2001)
- The Rothschilds and Their Collections of Illuminated Manuscripts (British Library, 2005)
- The Macclesfield Alphabet Book: A Facsimile, with Patricia Lovett (British Library, 2010)
- Gilding the Lilly: A Hundred Medieval and Illuminated Manuscripts in the Lilly Library (Lilly Library, Indiana University, 2010)
- Meetings with Remarkable Manuscripts (Allen Lane, 2016)
- Making Medieval Manuscripts (Bodleian Library, University of Oxford, 2018)
- The Book in the Cathedral: The Last Relic of Thomas Becket (Allen Lane, 2020)
- The Posthumous Papers of the Manuscripts Club (Allen Lane, 2022)
- The Manuscripts Club: The People Behind a Thousand Years of Medieval Manuscripts (Penguin Books, 2025)
- The Migrants: A Memoir with Manuscripts (Allen Lane, 2026)

== See also ==
Full interview whilst participating in the exhibition 'The Medieval Imagination'
