= The Eagle Unbowed =

The Eagle Unbowed: Poland and the Poles in the Second World War is a 2012 book by Halik Kochanski about the Polish contribution to World War II and published by Harvard University Press.

== Contents ==
One of the topics discussed in the book is the controversy caused by the humiliation of Poles during the Britain’s victory parade in 1946, when the organisers invited Fijians and Mexicans to participate, but not the Poles who had fought alongside the British.

== Reception ==
The book received generally good reviews from the community of historians in peer-reviewed outlets. Piotr Wróbel writing for Shofar: An Interdisciplinary Journal of Jewish Studies noted that the book is "a major achievement and explains many historical events misunderstood by Western readers". John Radzilowski in The Historian wrote that the book is "a welcome and useful corrective for both scholars and general readers" and "an important addition to English language literature on East-Central Europe in World War II". Eva Plach who reviewed the book for The Journal of Modern History noted that the work, while not presenting "any “new” information as such" is a "comprehensive text" and "an important resource" for those less familiar with the topic of wartime Polish history.

Michael Meng reviewed the book for the Slavic Review and noted more neutrally that it is "a nationally centred story about Polish struggles for freedom". Jan Grabowski in the Israel Journal of Foreign Affairs was more critical of the book, writing: "In addition to very problematic interpretations and insufficient or biased sources, The Eagle Unbowed is replete with factual errors...Those, however, who look for well-informed studies... will have to look elsewhere."

The book also received positive coverage in the mainstream press. The Books and Arts review in The Economist noted that until Kochanski's book, "nobody had written a comprehensive English-language history of Poland at war", and that she "weaves together the political, military, diplomatic and human strands of the story". Richard J. Evans reviewing the book for The Guardian described it as "a comprehensive study that provides a fair-minded introduction to the subject". Janusz R. Kowalczyk writing for culture.pl called it "the first comprehensive account of the fate of Poles on the fronts and wastelands of Second World War published in the West". Anne Applebaum in The New Republic called the book "extraordinarily ambitious", noting that it is "a book far bleaker, and far more ambiguous, than anything most Americans have read about the war" and comparing it to Snyder's Bloodlands. Antony Polonsky in TLS. Times Literary Supplement noted that the book "has many virtues". Wojciech Michnik in New Eastern Europe called the book a "monumental study" and "an extremely interesting and timely read".
