= Ruth Harris (historian) =

American historian (born 1958)

Professor Ruth Harris FBA
- Born: 25 December 1958 (age 67); Israel
- Title: Professor of Modern History
- Spouse: Iain Pears (m. 1985)
- Children: 2
- Awards: Wolfson History Prize (2010); Fellow of the British Academy (2011)

Academic background
- Education: University of Pennsylvania; University of Oxford
- Thesis: Murders and madness: legal psychiatry and criminal anthropology in Paris, 1880-1910 (1984)
- Doctoral advisor: Ludmilla Jordanova

Academic work
- Discipline: History
- Sub-discipline: Modern European history; history of France; history of religion; gender history; cultural history; history of science; history of medicine
- Institutions: St John's College, Oxford; Smith College; New College, Oxford; All Souls College, Oxford

Ruth Harris FBA (born 25 December 1958) is an American historian and academic. She has been Professor of Modern History at the University of Oxford since 2011 and a senior research fellow at All Souls College, Oxford, since 2016. Previously, she was a junior research fellow at St John's College, Oxford, from 1983 to 1987, an associate professor at Smith College from 1987 to 1990, and a fellow of New College, Oxford, between 1990 and 2016.

== Early life and education ==
Harris was born in Israel on 25 December 1958. She grew up in Philadelphia, Pennsylvania, United States. She studied at the University of Pennsylvania, graduating with a Bachelor of Arts (BA) degree and a Master of Arts (MA) degree. Having won a scholarship, she then studied at the University of Oxford and completed a Doctor of Philosophy (DPhil) degree in 1984. Her doctoral thesis was titled "Murders and madness: legal psychiatry and criminal anthropology in Paris, 1880-1910".

== Academic career ==
Harris began her academic career as a junior research fellow at St John's College, Oxford, between 1983 and 1987. In 1987, she was shortlisted for a position at Christ Church, Oxford, but "decided to withdraw when she realised there was only one other woman fellow at the college". Instead, she returned to the United States and took up a position at Smith College, an all-women's liberal arts college in Northampton, Massachusetts. From 1987 to 1990, she was an associate professor at Smith College.

In 1990, Harris returned to England and was elected a Fellow of New College, Oxford. At college level, she was a tutor in history. She also lectures in the Faculty of History, University of Oxford, and was granted a Title of Distinction in 2011 as Professor of Modern History. In 2016, she was elected a senior research fellow at All Souls College, Oxford.

Following Lourdes (1999), she was awarded the Wolfson History Prize in 2010 for her book The Man on Devil's Island, a biography on Alfred Dreyfus. From the 2010s onward, Harris's research shifted from French history toward the global and transnational history of religion and spirituality, including studies of Swami Vivekananda, Albert Schweitzer, Romain Rolland, Mahatma Gandhi, and Anagarika Dharmapala, and the exchange of Hindu and Buddhist ideas between South Asia and the West. In 2022, she published Guru to the World, a biography of the Indian monk Swami Vivekananda and his influence on spiritual life in both East and West.

In 2006, she delivered the George L. Mosse lectures at the University of Wisconsin, Madison. In 2017, delivered the George Macaulay Trevelyan lectures in Cambridge under the title "The Global Idealist Moment: Encounters between East and West, 1880–1940."

She is a member of the Editorial Board for Past & Present.

== Personal life ==
In 1985, Harris married Iain Pears, an author. Together they have two sons.

In May 2016, Harris was one of 300 prominent historians, including Simon Schama and Niall Ferguson, who were signatories to a letter to The Guardian, telling voters that if they chose to leave the European Union on 23 June, they would be condemning Britain to irrelevance.

== Awards and Honours ==
In 1996, Harris was awarded a Guggenheim Fellowship for research in French History. In 2000, she received the David H. Pinkney Prize by the Society for French Historical Studies for the most distinguished book in French history for Lourdes: Body and Spirit in a Secular Age. She was awarded the 2010 Wolfson History Prize for her book, The Man on Devil's Island: Alfred Dreyfus and the Affair that Divided France, which also won the National Jewish Book Award for Autobiography and Memoir that same year. In 2011, she was elected a Fellow of the British Academy (FBA), the UK's national academy for the humanities and the social sciences. In February 2014, she was made an Honorary Fellow of St John's College, Oxford. Her 2022 biography of Vivekananda, Guru to the World: The Life and Legacy of Vivekananda, was shortlisted for both the Elizabeth Longford Prize for Historical Biography and the PEN/Jacqueline Bogard Weld Award for Biography.

== Selected works ==
- Harris, Ruth (1985), "Murder under hypnosis", Psychological Medicine, Vol.15, No.3, (August 1985), pp. 477–505. doi:10.1017/S0033291700031366
- Harris, Ruth (1989). Murders and madness: medicine, law, and society in the fin de siècle. Oxford: Clarendon Press. ISBN 978-0198229919.
- Harris, Ruth (1999). Lourdes: body and spirit in a secular age. London: Allen Lane. ISBN 978-0713991864.
- Harris, Ruth, ed. (2006). The Art of Survival: Essays in Honour of Olwen Hufton. Oxford: Oxford Journals. ISBN 978-0199208029.
- Harris, Ruth (2010). The man on Devil's Island: Alfred Dreyfus and the affair that divided France. London: Allen Lane. ISBN 978-0713997309.
- Harris, Ruth (2022). Guru to the World: The Life and Legacy of Vivekananda. Cambridge, MA: Harvard University Press. ISBN 978-0-674-24747-5.
