= Fallen Idols: Twelve Statues That Made History =

Book about fallen statues

- Author: Alex von Tunzelmann
- Language: English
- Genre: History of art
- Publisher: Headline Publishing Group
- Publication date: 2021
- Publication place: United Kingdom
- Pages: 264
- ISBN: 978-1-4722-81876

Fallen Idols: Twelve Statues That Made History (2021), is a book authored by Alex von Tunzelmann and published by Headline Publishing Group in response to the removal or defacement of statues during the George Floyd protests of 2020. In it, von Tunzelmann explores the stories of twelve statues or groups of statues of historical figures, including the contexts in which they were erected, the reasons for which they later became contentious, and the circumstances leading to their removal, destruction or vandalism.

The paperback edition, published in 2022, amends the title to Fallen Idols: History is not erased when statues are pulled down. It is made.

== Contents ==
The book contains an introduction, twelve main chapters – each focused on a historical figure who features as a created then fallen statue – and a concluding chapter. There are 13 images.

The twelve case studies are:

- King George III (1738–1820): statue in Bowling Green Park, New York City, erected 1770, pulled down by American revolutionaries, 1776
- Prince William, Duke of Cumberland (1721–1765): statue in Cavendish Square, London, erected 1770, removed 1868
- Joseph Stalin (1878–1953): statue in the City Park, Budapest, Hungary, erected 1951, pulled down in the Hungarian Uprising of 1956
- Rafael Trujillo (1891–1961): statue in front of the Monumento de Santiago, Santiago de los Caballeros, Dominican Republic, erected 1949, pulled down following Trujillo's assassination, 1961
- King George V (1865–1936): statue in Prince's Park, New Delhi, India, erected 1936, removed 1968
- King Leopold II (1835–1909): statue in Léopoldville (now Kinshasa), Belgian Congo, erected 1928, removed 1966, temporarily restored 2005; and an identical statue in Place du Trône, Brussels, Belgium, erected 1926, still standing but frequently vandalised
- Vladimir Ilyich Lenin (1870–1924): multiple statues in the Soviet Union, erected 1926 onwards, removed 1991–2017; including discussion of Lenin's preserved body
- Saddam Hussein (1937–2006): statue in Firdos Square, Baghdad, Iraq, erected 2002, pulled down during the invasion of Iraq, 2003
- Cecil Rhodes (1853–1902): statue at the University of Cape Town, South Africa, erected 1934, removed following Rhodes Must Fall protests, 2015
- Robert E. Lee (1807–1870): statue in Tivoli Circle, New Orleans, Louisiana, USA, erected 1884, removed following protests by Take Em Down NOLA activists, 2017
- Edward Colston (1636–1721): statue in The Centre, Bristol, England, erected 1895, pulled down by Black Lives Matter protestors, 2020
- George Washington (1732–1799): statue in Rose City Park, Portland, Oregon, erected 1926, pulled down by racial justice protestors, 2020

=== Argument ===
Von Tunzelmann's commentary, while acknowledging the complexities of the debate, is broadly in support of the removal of statues with politically outdated or contentious messages. In particular, she takes issue with "the same four arguments" that are often made for retaining statues, which she characterises as:

- "The Erasure of History" (i.e. that to remove statues obliterates the historical record): von Tunzelmann responds that the public understanding of history depends on other, more significant factors, including education, archive preservation, and critical thinking.
- "The Man of His Time" (i.e. that a historical figure should not be judged by modern standards): von Tunzelmann responds that many commemorated figures were atypical within their societies, and received criticism in their own lifetimes.
- "The Importance of Law and Order" (i.e. that statues should only be removed by due process and by proper authority): von Tunzelmann responds that due process may not work, and sometimes leads to long delays and inconclusive results.
- "The Slippery Slope" (i.e. that pulling down one statue will trigger a domino effect): von Tunzelmann responds that a continuing debate and reassessment of historical figures is a healthy thing.

== Reception ==
Fallen Idols was reviewed by Michael Burleigh, who said "there is not a dull sentence in the book, which begins with the moment American revolutionaries toppled the statue of George III in New York."

It was shortlisted for the Wolfson History Prize 2022.
