= Indian Summer: The Secret History of the End of an Empire =

2007 historical book by Alex von Tunzelmann

- First Edition
- Author: Alex von Tunzelmann
- Cover artist: Photograph by Philip Gendreau/Bettmann/Corbis
- Language: English
- Subject: History
- Genre: Non-fiction
- Publisher: Henry Holt and Company, New York
- Publication date: August 2007
- Publication place: United Kingdom
- Media type: Print (Hardback)
- Pages: 401 pp
- ISBN: 978-0-8050-8073-5
- OCLC: 81945363
- Dewey Decimal: 954.03/59 22
- LC Class: DS480.842 .V66 2007

Indian Summer: The Secret History of the End of an Empire (2007) is a historical book written by British historian Alex von Tunzelmann. The book covers the end of British colonial rule in India and the consequences of the partition of the subcontinent; the book was advertised as "an extra ordinary saga of romance, history, religion, and political intrigue."

== Reception ==
Ben Macintyre writes in his New York Times review "Von Tunzelmann has a fine time puncturing royal pretension." Sarath Ramakrishnan considers the book "a curate’s egg of an effort, but none the less, admirable." in a Swarajya review.

=== Adaptation ===
It was set to be adapted into a film by Joe Wright with Hugh Grant and Cate Blanchett rumoured to be playing the Mountbattens; however, it was later reported that production on the film had been put on hold after budgetary concerns and opposition from the Indian government, reportedly concerned about an alleged affair between Jawaharlal Nehru and the wife of the last Viceroy of India, Edwina Mountbatten.
