= Meetings with Remarkable Manuscripts =

2017 book by Christopher de Hamel

- First edition
- Author: Christopher de Hamel
- Language: English
- Subject: Medieval art, religion
- Publisher: Allen Lane
- Publication date: April 2017
- Publication place: United Kingdom
- Media type: Print (Hardback and paperback)
- Pages: 640
- Award: Wolfson History Prize (2017)
- ISBN: 9781594206115
- OCLC: 1007563369
- Dewey Decimal: 091.094

Meetings with Remarkable Manuscripts (Note: Published as Meetings with Remarkable Manuscripts: Twelve Journeys into the Medieval World in the United States.) is a 2017 book by historian Christopher de Hamel that explores the European medieval world through an in-depth study of 12 illuminated manuscripts. It won the Wolfson History Prize in 2017.
