= Ludmilla Jordanova =

British historian and academic (born 1949)

Ludmilla Jordanova FRHistS FRSM
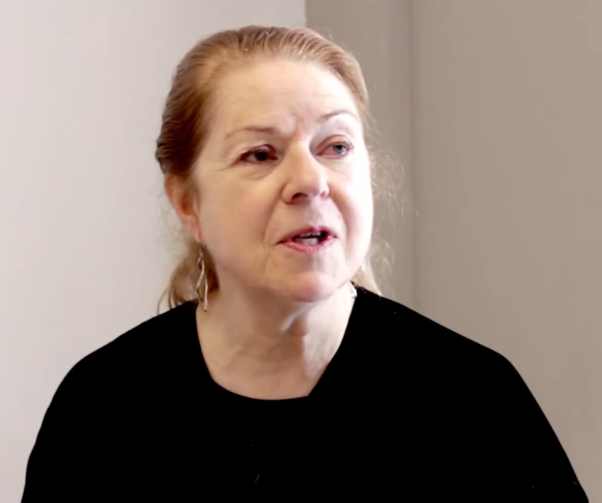
- Jordanova in 2021
- Born: Ludmilla Jane Jordanova; 10 October 1949 (age 77)
- Title: Professor Emeritus of Visual Culture
- Children: 2

Academic background
- Education: Oxford High School
- Alma mater: New Hall, Cambridge

Academic work
- Institutions: University of Oxford; University of Essex; University of York; University of East Anglia; University of Cambridge; King's College London; Durham University
- Doctoral students: Ruth Harris

Ludmilla Jane Jordanova FRHistS FRSM (born 10 October 1949) is a British historian and academic. She is Emeritus Professor of Visual Culture in the Department of History at Durham University.

== Biography ==
Jordanova was born to a Bulgarian father and English mother. Educated at Oxford High School and New Hall, Cambridge, Professor Jordanova has taught at the universities of Oxford, Essex, York, East Anglia, Cambridge and King's College London. Previously she held the position of Director of the Centre for Research in the Arts, Social Sciences and Humanities (CRASSH), University of Cambridge and was Professor of Visual Arts at the University of East Anglia. She has two children, Alix Green and Zara Figlio, and one granddaughter, Sam Green.

She is the author of many texts regarding the history of science, thinking, gender, and art, and is commonly referred to as one of the leading British experts in the field; she has also written broadly on the nature of her subject itself, including a book by the title History in Practice. Her most recent book, The Look of the Past: Visual and Material Evidence in Historical Practice was published by Cambridge University Press in September 2012. Professor Jordanova is a Fellow of the Royal Historical Society and of the Royal Society of Medicine and was the first female President of the British Society for the History of Science. She was a Trustee of the National Portrait Gallery (London) from 2001 to 2009, and in summer 2011 was appointed a Trustee of the National Museum of Science and Industry.
