= Halik Kochanski =

British historian and writer

Halik Kochanski (born 19 April 1962) is a British historian and writer of Polish origin.

== Life ==
Kochanski was educated at Downside School and at Balliol College, Oxford, where she was awarded an M.A. in Modern History. She obtained her Ph.D from King's College, London. She has taught history at King's College London and University College, London. She has written a number of historical articles and three books: Sir Garnet Wolseley: Victorian Hero (1999), The Eagle Unbowed: Poland and the Poles in the Second World War (2012) and Resistance: The Underground War in Europe, 1939-1945 (2022).

She is a Fellow of the Royal Historical Society, and a member of the Army Records Society, the Society for Army Historical Research, the British Commission for Military History and the Institute for Historical Research. As of 2012, she is a judge for the Templer Medal book prize.

She won the 2023 Wolfson History Prize for her book, Resistance.

== Bibliography ==
- 1999: Sir Garnet Wolseley: Victorian Hero. London: The Hambledon Press. ISBN 1-85285-188-0
- 2012: The Eagle Unbowed: Poland and the Poles in the Second World War. London: Allen Lane. ISBN 978-1-846-14354-0
- 2022: Resistance: The Underground War in Europe, 1939-1945. London: Allen Lane. ISBN 978-1-324-09165-3
