= John Pemble =

English historian

John Pemble is an English historian. He earned a degree from Clare College, Cambridge, then studied at the University of Pennsylvania, SOAS University of London, and Ecole Nationale des Langues Orientales Vivantes. He taught at the Royal Military Academy Sandhurst, University of Leicester, and University of Bristol. He is best known for his cultural history The Mediterranean Passion, which co-won the 1987 Wolfson Literary Award for History.

== Books ==
=== As author ===
- Pemble, John (1971). The Invasion of Nepal: John Company at War. Oxford: Clarendon Press.
- Pemble, John (1977). The Raj, the Indian Mutiny, and the Kingdom of Oudh, 1801-1859. Rutherford: Fairleigh Dickinson University Press.
- Pemble, John (1987). The Mediterranean Passion: Victorians and Edwardians in the South. New York: Oxford University Press.
- Pemble, John (1995). Venice Rediscovered. New York: Oxford University Press. ISBN 0-19-820501-5.
- Pemble, John (2000). John Addington Symonds: Culture and the Demon Desire. Houndmills, Baskingstoke and London: Macmillan.
- Pemble, John (2005). Shakespeare Goes to Paris: How the Bard Conquered France. London and New York: Hambledon and London.
- Pemble, John; Cross, J. P. (2008). Britain's Gurkha War: The Invasion of Nepal, 1814-16. Frontline.
- Pemble, John (2017). The Rome We Have Lost. New York: Oxford University Press.

=== As editor ===
- Fane, Isabella (1985). Pemble, John (ed.). Miss Fane in India: The Indian Diary of a Victorian Lady. Alan Sutton. ISBN 0-86299-240-0.
