= Vere Harmsworth Library =

University library in Oxford, England

Coordinates: 51.7576°N 1.2538°W

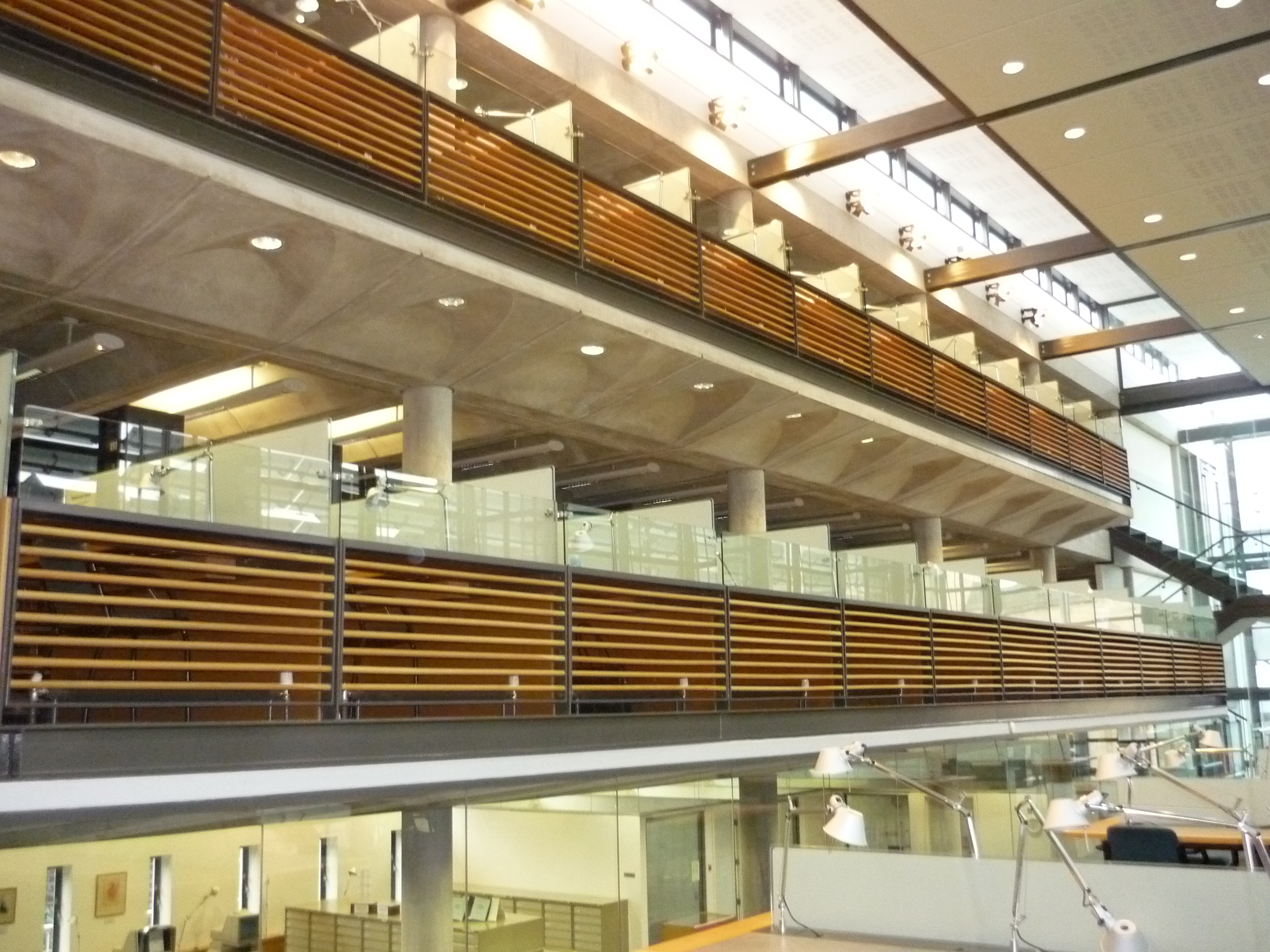
Interior view

The Vere Harmsworth Library is a dependent library of the Bodleian Library at the University of Oxford in the United Kingdom.

The library is the university's principal research library for the study of United States history and politics and is housed on the upper floors of the Rothermere American Institute, located on South Parks Road in central Oxford, England. It is named in honour of Vere Harmsworth, 3rd Viscount Rothermere, chairman of Daily Mail and General Trust, who was prominent in raising funds and support for the construction of the building.

The Vere Harmsworth Library has an extensive collection of printed primary and secondary literature, and a wide range of microfilm and online primary sources. About 80% of the library's printed collection is available as open-shelf material, with the remainder, including all works published before 1920, held underground in a climate-controlled bookstack. The library and institute were opened by US President Bill Clinton in May 2001.

Between December 2019 and September 2024, the Vere Harmsworth Library hosted the Radcliffe Science Library whilst the latter was under refurbishment.

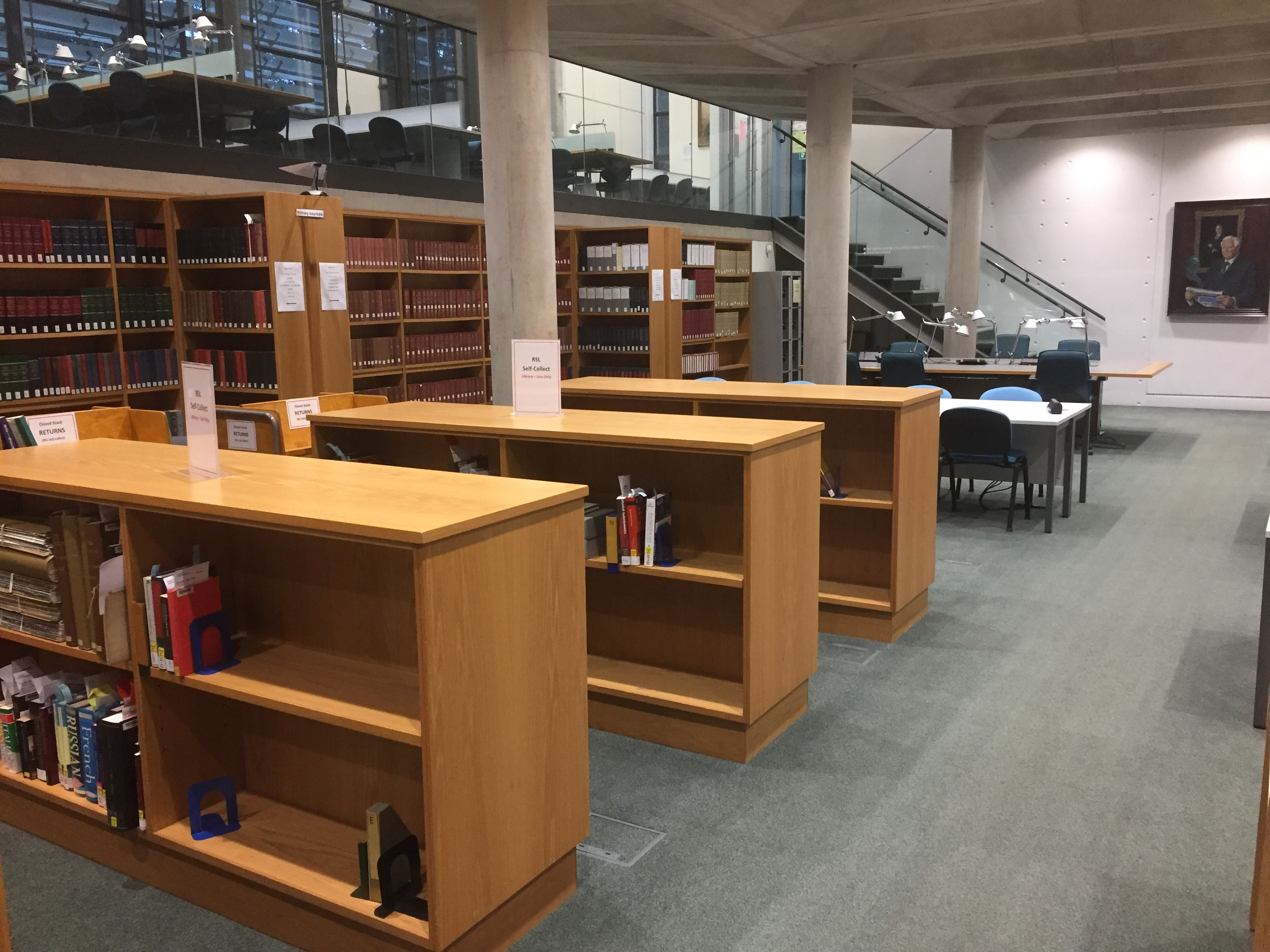
Ground floor

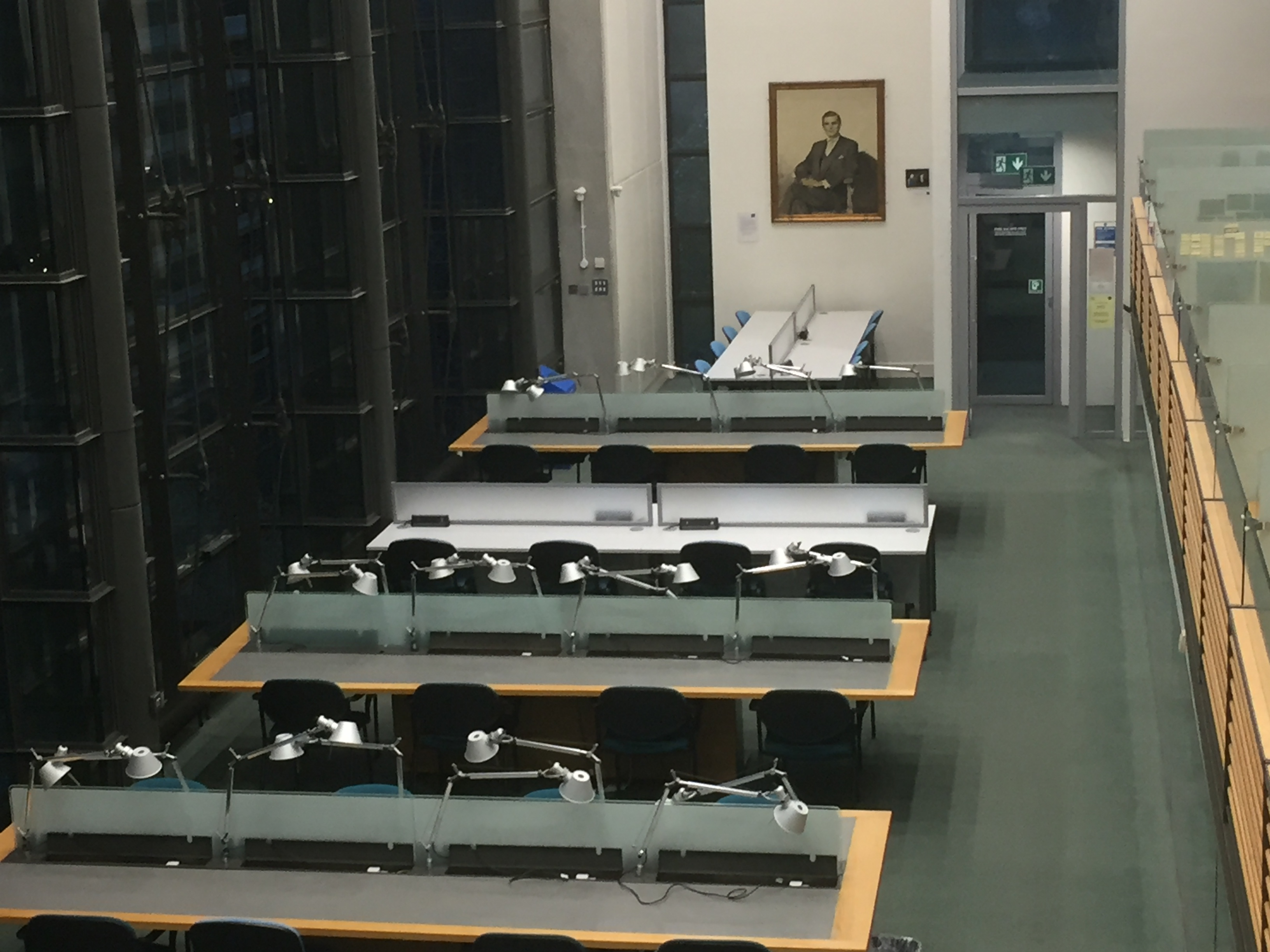
First floor
