= Oxford Libraries Information System =

Library catalogue of Oxford University

Oxford Libraries Information System (OLIS) was an online union catalog of books held by the libraries of the University of Oxford, England, which include the Bodleian Libraries group, and also those faculty libraries which are not members of the group, and the libraries of individual colleges. It operated the Geac ADVANCE integrated library system (ILS). Prior to 1996 it operated DOBIS/LIBIS software (which itself replaced the LS/2000 system). Oxford University Library Services (OULS) issued a tender for new software in 2005 which culminated in the selection of the Virtua system from VTLS, but in August 2008 Oxford announced that the implementation would not go forward. In 2010 it was confirmed that Aleph from Ex Libris would replace Geac ADVANCE. Aleph was implemented in July 2011.

OLIS was deprecated with the move to Aleph in 2011 and replaced by a new Integrated Library System (ILS). The functions offered by OLIS were moved to Search Oxford Libraries Online (SOLO).
