= Lyndal Roper =

Australian historian (born 1956)

Lyndal Roper FBA FAHA FRHistS
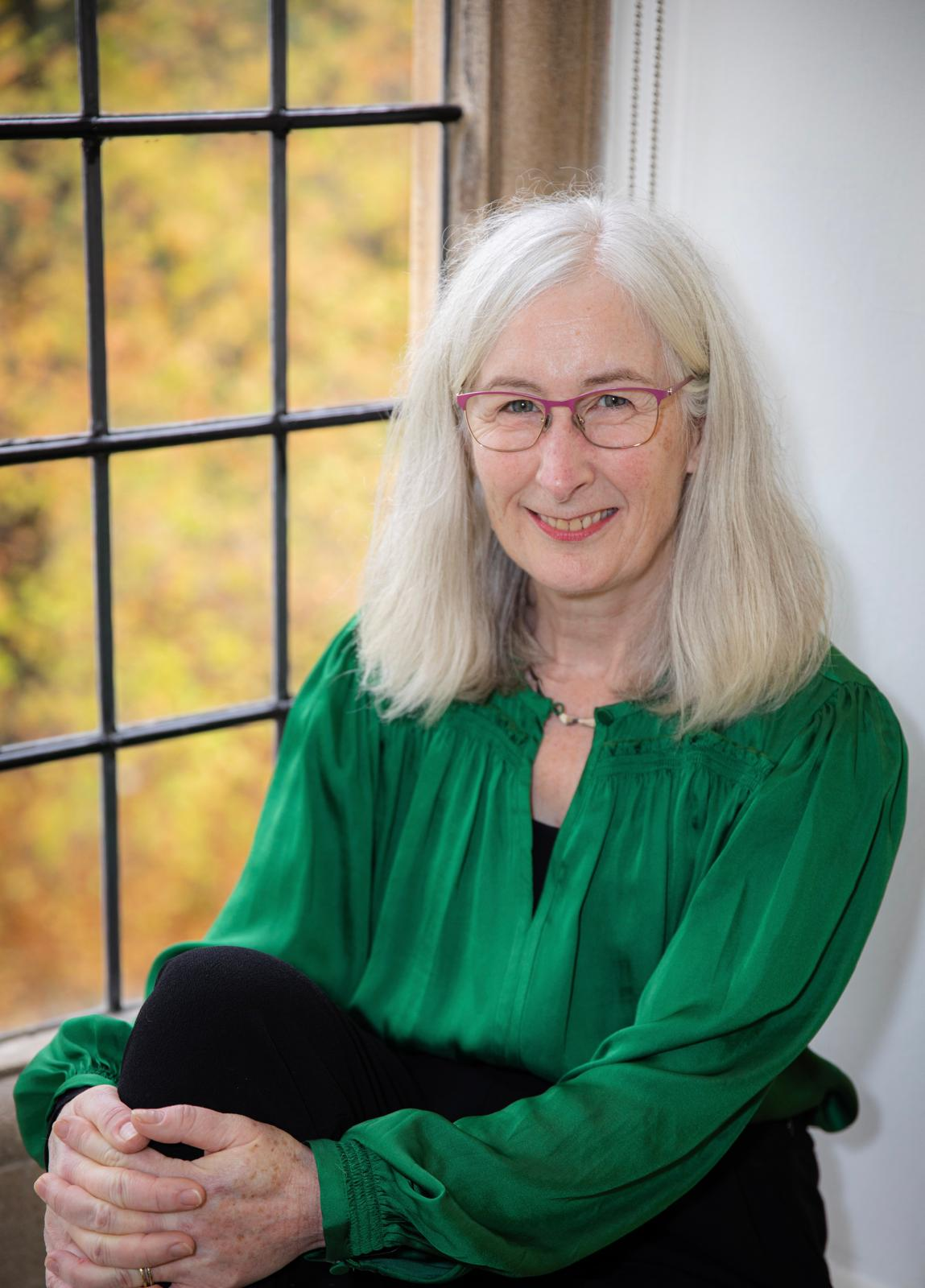
- Roper in 2025
- Born: 28 May 1956 (age 70); Melbourne, Victoria, Australia
- Occupations: Historian and academic
- Title: Regius Professor of History
- Spouse: Martin Donnelly
- Children: 1
- Awards: Holberg Prize (2026)

Academic background
- Education: University of Melbourne; University of Tübingen; King's College London
- Thesis: Work, Marriage and Sexuality: Women in Reformation Augsburg (1985)
- Doctoral advisor: Robert W. Scribner

Academic work
- Institutions: Merton College, Oxford; King's College London; Royal Holloway, University of London; Balliol College, Oxford; Oriel College, Oxford
- Notable students: Laura Gowing

Lyndal Anne Roper (born 28 May 1956) is an Australian historian and academic. She is the Holberg Laureate of 2026. She works on German history of the sixteenth to eighteenth centuries, and has written a biography of Martin Luther. Her research centres on gender and the Reformation, witchcraft, and visual culture. In 2011 she became the first woman and the first Australian to be appointed to the Regius Chair of History at the University of Oxford, a position she held until 2025.

== Education ==
Lyndal Anne Roper was born in Melbourne on 28 May 1956. She graduated from the University of Melbourne in history and philosophy in 1977, after which she received the first Caltex Woman Graduate of the Year scholarship and an additional scholarship from the University Women Graduates' association. An award from the German Academic Exchange Service (DAAD) allowed her to undertake study in Germany. During her initial nearly two years in Germany, Roper studied with Heiko Oberman at the University of Tübingen, and worked with Ingrid Batori and Hans-Christoph Rublack. She then moved to King's College London, where in 1985 she completed her PhD, supervised by Robert W. Scribner. Her thesis was titled Work, Marriage and Sexuality: Women in Reformation Augsburg.

== Career ==
Before completing her doctorate, Roper began a junior research fellowship at Merton College at the University of Oxford (1983–1986). In 1986 she took up a non-permanent lectureship at King's College London, and moved in 1987 to a permanent post at Royal Holloway, University of London, becoming professor in 1999 and establishing (with Amanda Vickery) the Bedford Centre for the History of Women and Gender. She has been fellow of the Wissenschaftskolleg zu Berlin (1991–1992) and has held visiting positions at the Eisenberg Centre, Ann Arbor, the University of Western Australia, the Australian National University, the Freie Universität Berlin and the Max Planck Institut, Göttingen. In 2002 she took up a lectureship and fellowship at Balliol College, Oxford. She is a fellow of Oriel College, Oxford, an honorary fellow of Merton College and a member of the editorial board of the History Workshop Journal.

== Books ==
=== The Holy Household: Women and Morals in Reformation Augsburg ===
Roper's 1989 book questioned the ways in which the Reformation changed gender relations, focussing on the case study of Augsburg, one of the most important cities of the Holy Roman Empire. Exploring the idea of 'civic righteousness,' Roper argued that the Reformation developed a theology of gender whereby the roles of men and women were clearly distinct within the vision of the 'holy household'. Whilst previously the effect of the Reformation on women was regarded as beneficial, this book argues that the status of women was instead worsened. The book has been translated into German and has been reprinted several times.

=== Oedipus and the Devil: Witchcraft, Religion and Sexuality in Early Modern Europe ===
A collection of nine interconnected essays, Oedipus and the Devil (1994) explores subjects ranging from the literary culture of the sixteenth century, to early-modern sexual attitudes and ideas regarding femininity and masculinity, to issues surrounding the complex development of marriage, and the use of psychoanalysis in studying witchcraft. Roper examines why a woman would kill her child, why someone would confess to living with the devil like husband and wife, and why a famous banker might employ a village clairvoyant ('Dorf hellseherin'). The work has been translated into German with Fischer Taschenbuch (Ödipus und der Teufel: Körper und Psyche in der Frühen Neuzeit) and is widely cited.

=== Witch Craze: Terror and Fantasy in Baroque Germany ===
Witch Craze (2004) explores the role of unconscious fantasy in history by taking four case studies of witch-hunting in southern Germany, the region with the highest number of executions of people accused as witches. Using extensive archival sources, including original trial transcripts, the book studies the psychology of witch-hunting, arguing that what powered them were fears surrounding fertility. Roper examines "why it was mostly older women that were the victims of witch crazes, why they confessed to crimes, and how the depiction of witches in art and literature has influenced the characterization of elderly women in our own culture". The book has been translated into German with Beck (Hexenwahn: Geschichte einer Verfolgung) and was awarded the Roland H. Bainton Prize in 2005.

=== The Witch in the Western Imagination ===
Exploring how witches and witchcraft have been portrayed through art and literature, The Witch in the Western Imagination (2012) builds on Roper's previous works to explain why witches are so often represented as old hags. Yet the figure of the witch is not always portrayed in a negative light, and she might be an individual who could stand up to authority and even represent the community itself. By delving into the importance of 'fantasy' to the interpretation of witches and witchcraft, Roper's nuanced study interprets "how individuals made sense of witchcraft, why the figure of the witch could arouse such intense emotion, and why she could be used in so many ways".

=== Martin Luther: Renegade and Prophet ===
Roper's Martin Luther: Renegade and Prophet (2016) has been translated into German, Spanish, Polish, Portuguese, Czech and Dutch; in Germany it became a best-seller. Published to coincide with the 500th anniversary of the posting of the 95 Theses and the start of the Reformation, Roper's biography is one of the first to locate Luther within his social and cultural context, foregrounding his physicality and thus seeking to understand his theology in new ways. The work was shortlisted for both the Wolfson History Prize and the Elizabeth Longford Prize.

=== Living I Was Your Plague: Martin Luther's World and Legacy ===
In Living I Was Your Plague (2021), Roper explores some of the more controversial aspects of Martin Luther's personality: his use of vulgar language, his pugilism, and his vehemently antisemitic views. The work also analyses the images of Luther created by Lucas Cranach the Elder that have become so instantly recognisable, showing how Luther carefully created the image of himself that he wanted to present to the world. Roper ends by assessing Luther's legacy in more recent years, in particular how he was presented in the former East Germany and how he was celebrated during the 2017 quincentenary year of the 95 Theses.

=== Summer of Fire and Blood: The German Peasants' War ===
Summer of Fire and Blood (2025) is the first English-language study of the German Peasants' War in a generation. The book argues that the uprising was not a disorderly or purely local rebellion, but a broad mass movement shaped by the social and religious tensions of the early Reformation. Roper emphasizes the political significance of the peasants’ demands, including the Twelve Articles, and examines the war’s violence, defeat, and long-term consequences for the Reformation and the development of territorial states in the German lands. It won the 2025 Cundill History Prize.

== Awards and honours ==
Roper won the Holberg Prize in 2026. In 2016 Roper won the Gerda Henkel Prize for lifetime achievement in history. Currently she holds a Humboldt Research Award (associated with the Free University Berlin) for research in Germany. She is honorary fellow of the History Department, University of Melbourne, fellow of the Australian Academy of the Humanities (2009), fellow of the British Academy (2011), and fellow of the Berlin-Brandenburgische Akademie der Wissenschaften, Berlin (2016). She also holds honorary doctorates from the University of Melbourne (2013) and the University of Basel (2021). In 2021 a portrait of Roper painted by Nneka Uzoigwe was hung in the dining hall of Oriel College, Oxford.

- 2000–2012, joint editor, Past & Present
- 2005, Roland H. Bainton Prize for Witch Craze: Terror and Fantasy in Baroque Germany
- 2009, Fellow, Australian Academy of the Humanities
- 2010, Honorary professorial fellow, University of Melbourne
- 2011, Fellow, British Academy
- 2013, Honorary doctorate, University of Melbourne
- 2013, Honorary fellow, Merton College, Oxford; Balliol College, Oxford
- 2015, Wiles Lectures, Queen's University Belfast
- 2015–2018, Chair of section H9, British Academy
- 2016, Gerda Henkel Preis
- 2016, Member Brandenburgische Akademie der Wissenschaften
- 2017, Laurence Stone Lectures, Princeton University
- 2019, Humboldt Prize
- 2020, Natalie Zemon Davis Lectures, Central European University
- 2021, Honorary doctorate in theology, University of Basel
- 2021, Lisa Jardine Lecture, Jesus College, Cambridge
- 2021–2023, Leverhulme Trust senior research fellowship
- 2025, Cundill History Prize for Summer of Fire and Blood: The German Peasants' War
- 2026, Holberg Prize

=== Legacy ===
In 2026, following Roper's retirement from the Regius Chair at Oxford, the Faculty of History established the Regius Prize in Roper's honour, for the best piece of historical research produced by an early career or fixed-term researcher at the University of Oxford.

Together with Ruth Harris and Deb Oxley, and with the help of Allida M. Black, Roper helped establish the Hillary Rodham Clinton Chair in Women's History at the University of Oxford, probably the first dedicated chair in women's history in the English-speaking world.

== Personal life ==
In May 2016, she was one of 300 prominent historians, including Simon Schama and Niall Ferguson, who were signatories to a letter to The Guardian, telling voters that if they chose to leave the European Union on 23 June, they would be condemning Britain to irrelevance.

Roper is married to former civil servant, Martin Donnelly.

== Selected works ==
- Disciplines of Faith: Studies in Religion, Politics, and Patriarchy (with Jim Obelkevich and Raphael Samuel) (Routledge and Kegan Paul, 1987)
- The Holy Household: Women and Morals in Reformation Augsburg. (Clarendon Press, 1989, 1991). Claims that the Reformation significantly worsened the situation of European women.
- "Witchcraft and fantasy in early modern Germany" (PDF). History Workshop Journal. 32 (1): 19–43. Autumn 1991. doi:10.1093/hwj/32.1.19., then as a chapter in Oedipus and the Devil and chapter 8, pp. 207–236, in the 1996 collection Witchcraft in Early Modern Europe: Studies in Culture and Belief, Past & Present Publications, Cambridge ISBN 978-0511599538 doi:10.1017/CBO9780511599538
- Oedipus and the Devil: Witchcraft, Sexuality and Religion in Early Modern Europe (Routledge, 1994)
- "Evil imaginings and fantasies: Child-witches and the end of the witch-craze", Past and Present, vol. 167 (May 2000), pp. 107–139
- Religion and Culture in Germany (1400–1800) (Posthumously collected essays of Robert W. Scribner) (Leiden: Brill, 2001).
- Witch Craze: Terror and Fantasy in Baroque Germany (Yale University Press, 2004), ISBN 9780300103359. 362pp.
- Dreams and History: The Interpretation of Dreams from Ancient Greece to Modern Psychoanalysis (ed. with Daniel Pick) (East Sussex: Brunner-Routledge, 2004) 276pp.
- "Witchcraft and the Western Imagination". Transactions of the Royal Historical Society. 16: 117–141. December 2006. JSTOR 25593863.. Claims that demonology could form part of a literature of entertainment.
- The Witch in the Western Imagination (University of Virginia Press, 2012). xi+240pp.
- Martin Luther: Renegade and Prophet (The Bodley Head, 2016)
- Living I Was Your Plague: Martin Luther's World and Legacy (Princeton University Press, 2021).
- Summer of Fire and Blood: The German Peasants' War (Basic Books, 2025), ISBN 9781541647039.
