= Michael Skapinker =

South African journalist

Michael Skapinker (born 1955 in South Africa) is a South African journalist. He is presently an associate editor of the Financial Times and a columnist.

== Life and career ==
=== Education ===
Skapinker graduated with a BA in law from the University of the Witwatersrand, Johannesburg and a Master's degree from Queens' College, Cambridge. He speaks French, modern Greek and Afrikaans.

=== Print journalism ===
Skapinker began his career as a Foreign Correspondent in Athens for CBS Radio News and Independent radio News, moving to the London Bureau of McGraw-Hill World News, then on the International Management Magazine as senior editor before joining the Financial Times in 1986 as a management writer. He held several positions at the Financial Times, including aerospace correspondent, leisure industry correspondent and electronics writer. In July 2005 Skapinker was appointed editor of the FT's weekend edition. He is also editor of Special Reports for the Financial Times.

=== Awards and recognition ===
In 2003 Skapinker received the Work Foundation Members' Award for his contribution to the understanding of working life.

He was named "Columnist of the Year" at the 2008 Workworld Media Awards.

He was named "Business Commentator of the Year" at the 2012 Editorial Intelligence Comment Awards.

He was a consultant on the 2003 BBC series The Secrets of Leadership.

In 2005 Skapinker was elected a Fellow of the Royal Society of Arts.

Skapinker was a member of the UK department for culture, media and sport ministerial working party on business tourism to Britain.
