= Cundill History Prize =

History writing award

- Awarded for: History writing
- Country: Canada
- Presented by: McGill University
- First award: 2008
- Website: www.cundillprize.com

The Cundill History Prize is an annual literary award for history writing in English. It was established in 2008 by Peter Cundill and is administered by McGill University. The prize is awarded to an author whose book, published in the past year, demonstrates "historical scholarship, originality, literary quality and broad appeal". No restrictions are set on the topic of the book or the nationality of the author, and English translations are permitted.

At a value of US$75,000, the grand prize is the largest prize in the world for a book of non-fiction in English. In addition, two finalists are awarded "Recognition of Excellence" prizes of $10,000 each. For translated works, 80% of the prize goes to the author, and 20% goes to the translator. The recipients of the prize are selected by a jury of historians and writers chosen by McGill. The prize has been called "the closest approximation to a Nobel Prize for history".

== History ==
The Cundill International Prize in History was established on April 17, 2008, at McGill University by Peter Cundill, a London-based investment manager and graduate of McGill. A grand prize of US$75,000, as well as two "Recognition of Excellence" prizes of $10,000, would be awarded once a year to authors whose books were "determined to have a profound literary, social and academic impact on the subject". Books were required to be published in English or French. Cundill said that he "was surprised to learn there were no major prizes in history" and added that "I'm an investment researcher of finance and I think there's an analogy between the two disciplines – both study the past to understand the present and predict the future." The inaugural prize in November 2008 was administered by the Dean of the Faculty of Arts at McGill, along with the McGill Institute for the Study of Canada (MISC).

In 2010, the prize was renamed the Cundill Prize in History. Cundill died on January 24, 2011, and the 2011 prize was limited to books that were published in English. The prize was retitled again in 2013 as the Cundill Prize in Historical Literature, and the partnership with MISC continued up to 2016. McGill relaunched the prize for its 10th year in 2017: it was renamed the Cundill History Prize, and the prize's logo and website design were overhauled.

== Winners and nominees ==
Winners and nominees
Year	Author	Book	Result	Ref.
2008	Stuart B. Schwartz	All Can Be Saved: Religious Tolerance and Salvation in the Iberian Atlantic World	Winner	
2008	Harold J. Cook	Matters of Exchange: Commerce, Medicine, and Science in the Dutch Golden Age	Finalist (Note: Also announced as a shortlist.)	
2008	Peter Fritzsche	Life and Death in the Third Reich	Finalist	
2008	Guy Beiner	Remembering the Year of the French: Irish Folk History and Social Memory	Longlist	
2008	Sarah Carter	The Importance of Being Monogamous: Marriage and Nation Building in Western Canada to 1915	Longlist	
2008	Matthew Connelly	Fatal Misconception: The Struggle to Control World Population	Longlist	
2008	John Darwin	After Tamerlane: The Rise and Fall of Global Empires, 1400–2000	Longlist	
2008	Saul Friedländer	The Years of Extermination: Nazi Germany and the Jews, 1939–1945	Longlist	
2008	Ramachandra Guha	India After Gandhi: The History of the World's Largest Democracy	Longlist	
2008	Leor Halevi	Muhammad's Grave: Death Rites and the Making of Islamic Society	Longlist	
2008	Judith Herrin	Byzantium: The Surprising Life of a Medieval Empire	Longlist	
2008	Erez Manela	The Wilsonian Moment: Self-Determination and the International Origins of Anticolonial Nationalism	Longlist	
2008	Gregg Mitman	Breathing Space: How Allergies Shape Our Lives and Landscapes	Longlist	
2008	Barrie Wilson	How Jesus Became Christian	Longlist	
2008	Jason R. Young	Rituals of Resistance: African Atlantic Religion in Kongo and the Lowcountry South in the Era of Slavery	Longlist	
2008	Jury: Angela Schottenhammer, Denise Chong, Natalie Zemon Davis, Roger Chartier, Serge Joyal, and Timothy Aitken			
2009	Lisa Jardine	Going Dutch: How England Plundered Holland's Glory	Winner	
2009	David Hackett Fischer	Champlain's Dream	Finalist	
2009	Pekka Hämäläinen	The Comanche Empire	Finalist	
2009	Vincent Brown	The Reaper's Garden: Death and Power in the World of Atlantic Slavery	Longlist	
2009	John Burrow	A History of Histories: Epics, Chronicles, Romances and Inquiries from Herodotus and Thucydides to the Twentieth Century	Longlist	
2009	Woody Holton	Unruly Americans and the Origins of the Constitution	Longlist	
2009	Karl Jacoby	Shadows at Dawn: A Borderlands Massacre and the Violence of History	Longlist	
2009	David Levering Lewis	God's Crucible: Islam and the Making of Europe, 570–1215	Longlist	
2009	Alex Ross	The Rest Is Noise: Listening to the Twentieth Century	Longlist	
2009	Moshik Temkin	The Sacco–Vanzetti Affair: America on Trial	Longlist	
2009	Jury: Angela Schottenhammer, Denise Chong, Kenneth Whyte, Roger Chartier, Serge Joyal, and Timothy Aitken			
2010	Diarmaid MacCulloch	A History of Christianity: The First Three Thousand Years	Winner	
2010	Giancarlo Casale	The Ottoman Age of Exploration	Finalist	
2010	Marla R. Miller	Betsy Ross and the Making of America	Finalist	
2010	Michael Burleigh	Moral Combat: A History of World War II	Longlist	
2010	Linda Gordon	Dorothea Lange: A Life Beyond Limits	Longlist	
2010	Francesca Trivellato	The Familiarity of Strangers: The Sephardic Diaspora, Livorno, and Cross-Cultural Trade in the Early Modern Period	Longlist	
2010	Jury: Adam Gopnik, Catherine Desbarats, Charles R. Kesler, Kenneth Whyte, and Lisa Jardine			
2011	Sergio Luzzatto	Padre Pio: Miracles and Politics in a Secular Age (Note: Translated from Italian by Frederika Randall.)	Winner	
2011	Maya Jasanoff	Liberty's Exiles: American Loyalists in the Revolutionary World	Finalist	
2011	Timothy Snyder	Bloodlands: Europe Between Hitler and Stalin	Finalist	
2011	Jeremy D. Popkin	You Are All Free: The Haitian Revolution and the Abolition of Slavery	Longlist	
2011	Ulinka Rublack	Dressing Up: Cultural Identity in Renaissance Europe	Longlist	
2011	Alan Taylor	The Civil War of 1812: American Citizens, British Subjects, Irish Rebels, & Indian Allies	Longlist	
2011	Jury: Anthony Cary, Catherine Desbarats, Jeffrey Simpson, Ramachandra Guha, and Stuart B. Schwartz			
2012	Stephen R. Platt	Autumn in the Heavenly Kingdom: China, the West, and the Epic Story of the Taiping Civil War	Winner	
2012	Steven Pinker	The Better Angels of Our Nature: Why Violence Has Declined	Finalist	
2012	Andrew Preston	Sword of the Spirit, Shield of Faith: Religion in American War and Diplomacy	Finalist	
2012	Stephen Greenblatt	The Swerve: How the World Became Modern	Longlist	
2012	Julia Lovell	The Opium War: Drugs, Dreams and the Making of China	Longlist	
2012	Anna Reid	Leningrad: Tragedy of a City Under Siege, 1941–44	Longlist	
2012	Jury: Charles R. Kesler, Garvin Brown, Jeffrey Simpson, and Vanessa Ruth Schwartz			
2013	Anne Applebaum	Iron Curtain: The Crushing of Eastern Europe, 1944–1956	Winner	
2013	Christopher Clark	The Sleepwalkers: How Europe Went to War in 1914	Finalist	
2013	Fredrik Logevall	Embers of War: The Fall of an Empire and the Making of America's Vietnam	Finalist	
2013	Christian Caryl	Strange Rebels: 1979 and the Birth of the 21st Century	Shortlist	
2013	Lynne Olson	Those Angry Days: Roosevelt, Lindbergh, and America's Fight Over World War II, 1939–1941	Shortlist	
2013	Tom Reiss	The Black Count: Glory, Revolution, Betrayal, and the Real Count of Monte Cristo	Shortlist	
2013	Peter Brown	Through the Eye of a Needle: Wealth, the Fall of Rome, and the Making of Christianity in the West, 350–550 AD	Honourable mention	
2013	Yang Jisheng	Tombstone: The Great Chinese Famine, 1958–1962 (Note: Translated from Chinese by Stacy Mosher and Guo Jian.)	Honourable mention	
2013	Jury: Anthony Cary, Garvin Brown, Marla R. Miller, Sergio Luzzatto, and Thomas H. B. Symons			
2014	Gary J. Bass	The Blood Telegram: Nixon, Kissinger, and a Forgotten Genocide	Winner	
2014	Richard Overy	The Bombing War: Europe, 1939–1945	Finalist	
2014	David Van Reybrouck	Congo: The Epic History of a People (Note: Translated from Dutch by Sam Garrett.)	Finalist	
2014	David Brion Davis	The Problem of Slavery in the Age of Emancipation	Shortlist	
2014	Andrew O'Shaughnessy	The Men Who Lost America: British Leadership, the American Revolution, and the Fate of the Empire	Shortlist	
2014	Geoffrey Wawro	A Mad Catastrophe: The Outbreak of World War I and the Collapse of the Habsburg Empire	Shortlist	
2014	Jury: Althia Raj, David Frum, Marla R. Miller, Stuart B. Schwartz, and Thomas H. B. Symons			
2015	Susan Pedersen	The Guardians: The League of Nations and the Crisis of Empire	Winner	
2015	Sven Beckert	Empire of Cotton: A Global History	Finalist	
2015	Bettina Stangneth	Eichmann Before Jerusalem: The Unexamined Life of a Mass Murderer (Note: Translated from German by Ruth Martin.)	Finalist	
2015	Claudio Saunt	West of the Revolution: An Uncommon History of 1776	Shortlist	
2015	Stuart B. Schwartz	Sea of Storms: A History of Hurricanes in the Greater Caribbean from Columbus to Katrina	Shortlist	
2015	Nikolaus Wachsmann	KL: A History of the Nazi Concentration Camps	Shortlist	
2015	Jury: Anna Porter, Anthony Cary, Chad Gaffield, David Frum, and Maya Jasanoff			
2016	Thomas W. Laqueur	The Work of the Dead: A Cultural History of Mortal Remains	Winner	
2016	David Wootton	The Invention of Science: A New History of the Scientific Revolution	Finalist	
2016	Andrea Wulf	The Invention of Nature: Alexander Von Humboldt's New World	Finalist	
2016	Mary Beard	SPQR: A History of Ancient Rome	Longlist	
2016	Robert J. Gordon	The Rise and Fall of American Growth: The U.S. Standard of Living Since the Civil War	Longlist	
2016	Philippe Sands	East West Street: On the Origins of Genocide and Crimes Against Humanity	Longlist	
2016	Jury: Anna Porter, David Frum, John Darwin, and Timothy Brook			
2017	Daniel Beer	The House of the Dead: Siberian Exile Under the Tsars	Winner	
2017	Christopher Goscha	Vietnam: A New History	Finalist	
2017	Walter Scheidel	The Great Leveler: Violence and the History of Inequality from the Stone Age to the Twenty-First Century	Finalist	
2017	Christopher de Bellaigue	The Islamic Enlightenment: The Modern Struggle Between Faith and Reason	Longlist	
2017	Christopher de Hamel	Meetings with Remarkable Manuscripts	Longlist	
2017	Frances FitzGerald	The Evangelicals: The Struggle to Shape America	Longlist	
2017	Joe Jackson	Black Elk: The Life of an American Visionary	Longlist	
2017	Lyndal Roper	Martin Luther: Renegade and Prophet	Longlist	
2017	S. A. Smith	Russia in Revolution: An Empire in Crisis, 1890 to 1928	Longlist	
2017	Heather Ann Thompson	Blood in the Water: The Attica Prison Uprising of 1971 and Its Legacy	Longlist	
2017	Jury: Margaret MacMillan (chair), Amanda Foreman, R. F. Foster, Rana Mitter, and Jeffrey Simpson			
2018	Maya Jasanoff	The Dawn Watch: Joseph Conrad in a Global World	Winner	
2018	Caroline Fraser	Prairie Fires: The American Dreams of Laura Ingalls Wilder	Finalist	
2018	Sam White	A Cold Welcome: The Little Ice Age and Europe's Encounter with North America	Finalist	
2018	Anne Applebaum	Red Famine: Stalin's War on Ukraine	Shortlist	
2018	Ron Chernow	Grant	Shortlist	
2018	Joshua B. Freeman	Behemoth: A History of the Factory and the Making of the Modern World	Shortlist	
2018	Tim Grady	A Deadly Legacy: German Jews and the Great War	Shortlist	
2018	David I. Kertzer	The Pope Who Would Be King: The Exile of Pius IX and the Emergence of Modern Europe	Shortlist	
2018	Geraldine Heng	The Invention of Race in the European Middle Ages	Longlist	
2018	David King	The Trial of Adolf Hitler: The Beer Hall Putsch and the Rise of Nazi Germany	Longlist	
2018	James E. Lewis Jr.	The Burr Conspiracy: Uncovering the Story of an Early American Crisis	Longlist	
2018	Tiya Miles	The Dawn of Detroit: A Chronicle of Slavery and Freedom in the City of the Straits	Longlist	
2018	Jury: Mark Gilbert (chair), Carol Berkin, Caroline Elkins, Peter Frankopan, and Jeffrey Simpson			
2019	Julia Lovell	Maoism: A Global History	Winner	
2019	Mary Fulbrook	Reckonings: Legacies of Nazi Persecution and the Quest for Justice	Finalist	
2019	Jill Lepore	These Truths: A History of the United States	Finalist	
2019	Sunil Amrith	Unruly Waters: How Rains, Rivers, Coasts, and Seas Have Shaped Asia's History	Shortlist	
2019	Helen Berry	Orphans of Empire: The Fate of London's Foundlings	Shortlist	
2019	David W. Blight	Frederick Douglass: Prophet of Freedom	Shortlist	
2019	Toby Green	A Fistful of Shells: West Africa from the Rise of the Slave Trade to the Age of Revolution	Shortlist	
2019	Victoria Johnson	American Eden: David Hosack, Botany, and Medicine in the Garden of the Early Republic	Shortlist	
2019	Jay Howard Geller	The Scholems: A Story of the German-Jewish Bourgeoisie from Emancipation to Destruction	Longlist	
2019	Ramachandra Guha	Gandhi: The Years That Changed the World, 1914–1948	Longlist	
2019	Steve Luxenberg	Separate: The Story of Plessy v. Ferguson, and America's Journey from Slavery to Segregation	Longlist	
2019	Jonathan Phillips	The Life and Legend of the Sultan Saladin	Longlist	
2019	Alexandra Popoff	Vasily Grossman and the Soviet Century	Longlist	
2019	Sue Prideaux	I Am Dynamite! A Life of Friedrich Nietzsche	Longlist	
2019	Jury: Alan Taylor (chair), Charlotte Gray, Robert Gerwarth, Jane Kamensky, and Rana Mitter			
2020	Camilla Townsend	Fifth Sun: A New History of the Aztecs	Winner	
2020	Vincent Brown	Tacky's Revolt: The Story of an Atlantic Slave War	Finalist	
2020	William Dalrymple	The Anarchy: The Relentless Rise of the East India Company	Finalist	
2020	Roderick Beaton	Greece: Biography of a Modern Nation	Shortlist	
2020	Richard M. Eaton	India in the Persianate Age, 1000–1765	Shortlist	
2020	Kim Ghattas	Black Wave: Saudi Arabia, Iran, and the Forty-Year Rivalry That Unraveled Culture, Religion, and Collective Memory in the Middle East	Shortlist	
2020	Kerri K. Greenidge	Black Radical: The Life and Times of William Monroe Trotter	Shortlist	
2020	Rashid Khalidi	The Hundred Years' War on Palestine: A History of Settler Colonialism and Resistance, 1917–2017	Shortlist	
2020	Paul Lay	Providence Lost: The Rise and Fall of Cromwell's Protectorate	Shortlist	
2020	Claudio Saunt	Unworthy Republic: The Dispossession of Native Americans and the Road to Indian Territory	Shortlist	
2020	Zachary D. Carter	The Price of Peace: Money, Democracy, and the Life of John Maynard Keynes	Longlist	
2020	Bathsheba Demuth	Floating Coast: An Environmental History of the Bering Strait	Longlist	
2020	Eric Foner	The Second Founding: How the Civil War and Reconstruction Remade the Constitution	Longlist	
2020	Jóhanna Katrín Friðriksdóttir	Valkyrie: The Women of the Viking World	Longlist	
2020	Pekka Hämäläinen	Lakota America: A New History of Indigenous Power	Longlist	
2020	John Henderson	Florence Under Siege: Surviving Plague in an Early Modern City	Longlist	
2020	Jury: Peter Frankopan (chair), Anne Applebaum, Lyse Doucet, Eliga Gould, and Sujit Sivasundaram			
2021	Marjoleine Kars	Blood on the River: A Chronicle of Mutiny and Freedom on the Wild Coast	Winner	
2021	Rebecca Clifford	Survivors: Children's Lives After the Holocaust	Finalist	
2021	Marie Favereau	The Horde: How the Mongols Changed the World	Finalist	
2021	Manan Ahmed Asif	The Loss of Hindustan: The Invention of India	Shortlist	
2021	Tim Harper	Underground Asia: Global Revolutionaries and the Assault on Empire	Shortlist	
2021	Martha S. Jones	Vanguard: How Black Women Broke Barriers, Won the Vote, and Insisted on Equality for All	Shortlist	
2021	Emma Rothschild	An Infinite History: The Story of a Family in France over Three Centuries	Shortlist	
2021	Tyler Stovall	White Freedom: The Racial History of an Idea	Shortlist	
2021	Linda Colley	The Gun, the Ship, and the Pen: Warfare, Constitutions, and the Making of the Modern World	Longlist	
2021	Guy de la Bédoyère	Gladius: Living, Fighting and Dying in the Roman Army	Longlist	
2021	Shay Hazkani	Dear Palestine: A Social History of the 1948 War	Longlist	
2021	Judith Herrin	Ravenna: Capital of Empire, Crucible of Europe	Longlist	
2021	Louis Menand	The Free World: Art and Thought in the Cold War	Longlist	
2021	Sujit Sivasundaram	Waves Across the South: A New History of Revolution and Empire	Longlist	
2021	Jury: Michael Ignatieff (chair), Eric Foner, Henrietta Harrison, Sunil Khilnani, and Jennifer L. Morgan			
2022	Tiya Miles	All That She Carried: The Journey of Ashley's Sack, a Black Family Keepsake	Winner	
2022	Ada Ferrer	Cuba: An American History	Finalist	
2022	Vladislav M. Zubok	Collapse: The Fall of the Soviet Union	Finalist	
2022	J. P. Daughton	In the Forest of No Joy: The Congo–Océan Railroad and the Tragedy of French Colonialism	Shortlist	
2022	Henrietta Harrison	The Perils of Interpreting: The Extraordinary Lives of Two Translators Between Qing China and the British Empire	Shortlist	
2022	Harald Jähner	Aftermath: Life in the Fallout of the Third Reich, 1945–1955 (Note: Translated from German by Shaun Whiteside.)	Shortlist	
2022	Mae Ngai	The Chinese Question: The Gold Rushes and Global Politics	Shortlist	
2022	M. E. Sarotte	Not One Inch: America, Russia, and the Making of Post–Cold War Stalemate	Shortlist	
2022	Kelly Lytle Hernández	Bad Mexicans: Race, Empire, and Revolution in the Borderlands	Longlist	
2022	Mark Mazower	The Greek Revolution: 1821 and the Making of Modern Europe	Longlist	
2022	Jing Tsu	Kingdom of Characters: The Language Revolution That Made China Modern	Longlist	
2022	Jury: J. R. McNeill (chair), Misha Glenny, Martha S. Jones, Yasmin Khan, and Kenda Mutongi			
2023	Tania Branigan	Red Memory: Living, Remembering and Forgetting China's Cultural Revolution	Winner	
2023	James Morton Turner	Charged: A History of Batteries and Lessons for a Clean Energy Future	Finalist	
2023	Kate Cooper	Queens of a Fallen World: The Lost Women of Augustine's Confessions	Finalist	
2023	Alison Bashford	An Intimate History of Evolution: The Story of the Huxley Family	Shortlist	
2023	Matthew Connelly	The Declassification Engine: What History Reveals About America's Top Secrets	Shortlist	
2023	Mackenzie Cooley	The Perfection of Nature: Animals, Breeding, and Race in the Renaissance	Shortlist	
2023	Douglas Ober	Dust on the Throne: The Search for Buddhism in Modern India	Shortlist	
2023	Patrick Weil	The Madman in the White House: Sigmund Freud, Ambassador Bullitt, and the Lost Psychobiography of Woodrow Wilson	Shortlist	
2023	Nandini Das	Courting India: England, Mughal India and the Origins of Empire	Longlist	
2023	Kerri K. Greenidge	The Grimkes: The Legacy of Slavery in an American Family	Longlist	
2023	Adam Hochschild	American Midnight: The Great War, a Violent Peace, and Democracy's Forgotten Crisis	Longlist	
2023	Natalie Koch	Arid Empire: The Entangled Fates of Arizona and Arabia	Longlist	
2023	Janina Ramirez	Femina: A New History of the Middle Ages, Through the Women Written Out of It	Longlist	
2023	Tara Zahra	Against the World: Anti-Globalism and Mass Politics Between the World Wars	Longlist	
2023	Jury: Philippa Levine (chair), Marie Favereau, Adam Gopnik, Eve M. Troutt Powell, Sol Serrano, and Coll Thrush			
2024	Kathleen DuVal	Native Nations: A Millennium in North America	Winner	
2024	Gary J. Bass	Judgment at Tokyo: World War II on Trial and the Making of Modern Asia	Finalist	
2024	Dylan C. Penningroth	Before the Movement: The Hidden History of Black Civil Rights	Finalist	
2024	Lauren Benton	They Called It Peace: Worlds of Imperial Violence	Shortlist	
2024	Joya Chatterji	Shadows at Noon: The South Asian Twentieth Century	Shortlist	
2024	Andrew C. McKevitt	Gun Country: Gun Capitalism, Culture, and Control in Cold War America	Shortlist	
2024	Stuart A. Reid	The Lumumba Plot: The Secret History of the CIA and a Cold War Assassination	Shortlist	
2024	David Van Reybrouck	Revolusi: Indonesia and the Birth of the Modern World (Note: Translated from Dutch by David Colmer and David McKay.)	Shortlist	
2024	Amitav Ghosh	Smoke and Ashes: Opium's Hidden Histories	Longlist	
2024	Catherine Hall	Lucky Valley: Edward Long and the History of Racial Capitalism	Longlist	
2024	Julian Jackson	France on Trial: The Case of Marshal Pétain	Longlist	
2024	Patrick Joyce	Remembering Peasants: A Personal History of a Vanished World	Longlist	
2024	Ruby Lal	Vagabond Princess: The Great Adventures of Gulbadan	Longlist	
2024	Jury: Rana Mitter (chair), Nicole Eustace, Moses Ochonu, Rebecca L. Spang, and Stephanie Nolen			
2025	Lyndal Roper	Summer of Fire and Blood: The German Peasants' War	Winner	
2025	Sophia Rosenfeld	The Age of Choice: A History of Freedom in Modern Life	Finalist	
2025	Marlene L. Daut	The First and Last King of Haiti: The Rise and Fall of Henry Christophe	Finalist	
2025	Emily Callaci	Wages for Housework: The Feminist Fight Against Unpaid Labor	Shortlist	
2025	Kornel Chang	A Fractured Liberation: Korea Under US Occupation	Shortlist	
2025	Greg Grandin	America, América: A New History of the New World	Shortlist	
2025	Benjamin Nathans	To the Success of Our Hopeless Cause: The Many Lives of the Soviet Dissident Movement	Shortlist	
2025	Martha A. Sandweiss	The Girl in the Middle: A Recovered History of the American West	Shortlist	
2025	Manan Ahmed Asif	Disrupted City: Walking the Pathways of Memory and History in Lahore	Longlist	
2025	Santilla Chingaipe	Black Convicts: How Slavery Shaped Australia	Longlist	
2025	Jonathan Gienapp	Against Constitutional Originalism: A Historical Critique	Longlist	
2025	Tiya Miles	Night Flyer: Harriet Tubman and the Faith Dreams of a Free People	Longlist	
2025	Josephine Quinn	How the World Made the West: A 4,000-Year History	Longlist	
2025	Seth Rockman	Plantation Goods: A Material History of American Slavery	Longlist	
2025	Sanjay Subrahmanyam	Across the Green Sea: Histories from the Western Indian Ocean, 1440–1640	Longlist	
2025	Jury: Ada Ferrer (chair), Sunil Amrith, François Furstenberg, Afua Hirsch, and Francesca Trivellato			
2026	Beth Lew-Williams	John Doe Chinaman: A Forgotten History of Chinese Life Under American Racial Law	Winner	
2026	Jonathan Cheng	Korean Messiah: Kim Il Sung and the Christian Roots of North Korea's Personality Cult	Finalist	
2026	Alexander Lee	The First Ghetto: Venice and the Jews	Finalist	
2026	Louise Brangan	The Fallen: The Magdalene Laundries and Ireland's Legacy of Silence	Shortlist	
2026	Sam Dalrymple	Shattered Lands: Five Partitions and the Making of Modern Asia	Shortlist	
2026	Linford D. Fisher	Stealing America: The Hidden Story of Indigenous Slavery in U.S. History	Shortlist	
2026	Eric T. Jennings	Vanilla: The History of an Extraordinary Bean	Shortlist	
2026	Jill Lepore	We the People: A History of the U.S. Constitution	Shortlist	
2026	Zara Anishanslin	The Painter's Fire: A Forgotten History of the Artists Who Championed the American Revolution	Longlist	
2026	Catherine Conybeare	Augustine the African	Longlist	
2026	Howard W. French	The Second Emancipation: Nkrumah, Pan-Africanism, and Global Blackness at High Tide	Longlist	
2026	Paul Gillingham	Mexico: A 500-Year History	Longlist	
2026	Barnaby Phillips	The African Kingdom of Gold: Britain and the Asante Treasure	Longlist	
2026	Carol Chillington Rutter	Lying Abroad: Henry Wotton and the Invention of Diplomacy	Longlist	
2026	Joseph Torigian	The Party's Interests Come First: The Life of Xi Zhongxun, Father of Xi Jinping	Longlist	
2026	Jury: Emily Greenwood (chair), Ned Blackhawk, Fergal Keane, and Barbara Weinstein			

== Authors with multiple nominations ==
3 nominations

- Tiya Miles

2 nominations

- Anne Applebaum
- Manan Ahmed Asif
- Gary J. Bass
- Vincent Brown
- Matthew Connelly
- Kerri K. Greenidge
- Ramachandra Guha
- Pekka Hämäläinen
- Judith Herrin
- Maya Jasanoff
- Jill Lepore
- Julia Lovell
- Lyndal Roper
- Claudio Saunt
- Stuart B. Schwartz
- David Van Reybrouck

== See also ==
- List of history awards
