= Cundill =

Cundill may refer to:

== People ==
- John Cundill, South African journalist and scriptwriter
- Peter Cundill, Canadian value investor

== Arts ==
- Cundill History Prize, history writing award

== See also ==
- Cundill Block, historic building in Iowa
