= Second Founding =

Second Founding can refer to the following:

- African American founding fathers of the United States
  - The Second Founding is about a book by Eric Foner
- Space Marine (Warhammer 40,000) is about a video game.
