= Daughton =

Daughton is a surname. Notable people with the surname include:

- James Daughton (born 1950), American actor
- J.P. Daughton (born 1970), American historian
- Ralph Hunter Daughton (1885–1958), American politician
- Thomas F. Daughton (born 1961), American diplomat

== See also ==
- Draughton (disambiguation)
