= David Wootton =

David Wootton may refer to:

- David Wootton (historian) (born 1952), English historian
- David Wootton (lord mayor) (born 1950), Lord Mayor of London 2011–2012

== See also ==
- David Wotton (born 1942), Australian politician
