= Sandweiss =

Sandweiss is a German surname, Sand means sand and weiss - white. Notable people with the surname include:

- Ellen Sandweiss (born 1958), American actress
- Martha A. Sandweiss, American historian
