= Patrick Joyce =

Patrick Joyce may refer to:

- Patrick Joyce (historian), British social historian
- Patrick Weston Joyce (1827–1914), Irish historian
- Patrick H. Joyce (1879–1946), American railroad executive
- Paddy Joyce (1923–2000), Irish actor
- Patrick Joyce (politician), American politician
