= Mass dictatorship =

Mass dictatorship, also known as consensus dictatorship (German: Konsensdiktatur), is a concept developed to explain the phenomenon of a political dictatorship that rules primarily with popular support rather than by terror; it is therefore opposed to the totalitarianism theory of dictatorship. Examples of consensus dictatorships cited include Nazi Germany and East Germany. The book Life and Death in the Third Reich by Peter Fritzsche is an example of a work that portrays Nazi Germany as a consensus dictatorship.
