= The Blood Telegram: Nixon, Kissinger, and a Forgotten Genocide =

Nonfiction book by Gary J. Bass

- Author: Gary J. Bass
- Language: English
- Genre: History
- Publisher: Alfred A. Knopf
- Publication date: 2013
- Publication place: United States
- Media type: Print (hardcover and paperback)
- Pages: xxiv, 499 (first edition)
- ISBN: 978-0-307-70020-9

The Blood Telegram: Nixon, Kissinger, and a Forgotten Genocide (also released as The Blood Telegram: India's Secret War in East Pakistan) is a 2013 book by American journalist and academic Gary J. Bass about The Blood telegram, a state department dissent memo on American policy during the 1971 Bangladesh genocide sent by Archer Blood the American Consul General to Dhaka, East Pakistan.

== Author ==
Gary J. Bass is an American journalist and a professor of politics and international affairs at Princeton University.

== Contents ==
Following the 1970 Pakistani general election held under General Yahya Khan, Sheikh Mujibur Rahman and his Awami League won the election. Sheikh Mujibur Rahman was an ethnic Bengali from East Pakistan, which was a Bengali majority province. The Pakistan Army was composed mostly of recruits from Punjab and other provinces in West Pakistan. On March 25, 1971, the Pakistan Army launched a crackdown on East Pakistan and started the 1971 anti-Hindu, anti-Bengali Bangladesh Genocide. Archer Blood was then the U.S. consul general in Dhaka, East Pakistan. The staff at the U.S. consulate in Dhaka were "horrified" by the violence and asked Washington, D.C. to intervene. Blood later described the response from Washington as "deafening" silence. Then Blood and his staff created a dissent cable, the Blood telegram. Richard Nixon and Henry Kissinger did not intervene because they were trying to use Pakistan to open diplomatic relations with China.

An excerpt from the telegram reads, "Our government has failed to denounce the suppression of democracy. Our government has failed to denounce atrocities.... Our government has evidenced what many will consider moral bankruptcy...."

== Critical reception ==
Dexter Filkins wrote in The New York Times, "Nixon and Kissinger spent the decades after leaving office burnishing their images as great statesmen. This book goes a long way in showing just how undeserved those reputations are." In 2014 it was the winner of the Lionel Gelber Prize and the Cundill Prize in Historical Literature. It also won the 2013 Ramnath Goenka Excellence in Journalism Awards in the Non-Fiction Book category.
