= Louise Brangan =

Irish sociologist and writer

- Education: University of Edinburgh (PhD)
- Years active: 2018–present
- Employers: London School of Economics; University of Strathclyde; University of Stirling

Louise Brangan is an Irish sociologist and writer who researches justice and punishment. As of 2026, she is an Assistant Professor at the London School of Economics (LSE). She was named a 2023 BBC New Generation Thinker. Her book The Fallen: The Magdalene Laundries and Ireland's Legacy of Silence (2026) earned second prize at the Giles St Aubyn Awards for Non-Fiction among other accolades.

Brangan previously held positions at the University of Strathclyde and the University of Stirling.

== Early life and education ==
Brangan grew up in Dublin. She completed her PhD in Criminology at the University of Edinburgh in 2017–2018. During her PhD, she won the 2015 Fulbright Irish Student Award to be a visiting scholar at the University of California, Berkeley. She later pursued a Master of Research (MRes) in Creative Writing at the University of Strathclyde.

== Career ==
After completing her PhD, Brangan joined the University of Stirling as a lecturer in Criminology in 2019. Her article for the British Journal of Criminology titled "Civilizing Imprisonment: The Limits of Scottish Penal Exceptionalism" (2019) won the British Society of Criminology's 2020 Brian Williams Prize. In 2021, Brangan was appointed Chancellor's Fellow of the University of Strathclyde's School of Social Work and Social Policy. That year, she published her debut academic book The Politics of Punishment: A Comparative Study of Imprisonment and Political Culture. Her Theoretical Criminology article titled "Pastoral penality in 1970s Ireland: Addressing the pains of imprisonment" won the journal's 2021 best article prize.

Brangan was selected as a 2023 BBC and AHRC New Generation Thinker. Through this, she contributed an episode on Ireland's Magdalene laundries to the BBC Radio 3 programme Essay in 2024. Brangan co-wrote the script for Sinead McCann's dance/performance piece The Ireland We Dreamed Of. She also collaborated with McCann and Ethna Rose O'Regan on the 2025 exhibition What Does It Mean to Know? at the LAB Gallery in Dublin.

Via a nine-way auction in 2024, The Bodley Head acquired the rights to publish Brangan's debut trade book The Fallen: The Magdalene Laundries and Ireland's Legacy of Silence in 2026. It also had a U.S. release via Simon & Schuster. Brangan felt motivated to write the book to detangle popular misconceptions of the Magdalene laundries, such as the conflation of the laundries with mother and baby homes. Ahead of its publication, The Fallen earned second prize at the 2024 Giles St Aubyn Awards for Non-Fiction. It was shortlisted for the 2026 Cundill History Prize.

Also in 2026, Brangan joined the London School of Economics as an Associate Professor in the Department of Sociology.

== Select bibliography ==
=== Books ===
- The Politics of Punishment: A Comparative Study of Imprisonment and Political Culture (2021)
- The Fallen: The Magdalene Laundries and Ireland's Legacy of Silence (2026)

=== Dance theatre ===
- The Ireland We Dreamed Of (2024) with Sinead McCann

== Accolades ==
Year	Award	Category	Title	Result	Ref.
2020	British Society of Criminology	Brian Williams Prize	"Civilizing Imprisonment: The Limits of Scottish Penal Exceptionalism"	Won	
2021	Theoretical Criminology	Best Article Prize	"Pastoral penality in 1970s Ireland: Addressing the pains of imprisonment"	Won	
2024	Giles St Aubyn Awards for Non-Fiction		The Fallen: The Magdalene Laundries and Ireland's Legacy of Silence	2nd	
2026	Cundill History Prize		The Fallen: The Magdalene Laundries and Ireland's Legacy of Silence	Shortlisted	
