= Sunil Amrith =

Kenyan historian (born 1979)

Professor Sunil Amrith
- Born: 4 September 1979 (age 47); Nairobi, Kenya
- Awards: 2016 Infosys Prize in Humanities; 2017 MacArthur Fellowship; 2024 British Academy Fellowship

Academic background
- Education: University of Cambridge

Academic work
- Institutions: University of Cambridge; University of London; Harvard University; Yale University
- Website: sunilamrithauthor.com

Sunil S. Amrith (born 4 September 1979) is a historian who holds the post of Renu and Anand Dhawan Professor of History at Yale University. He is also Yale's vice provost for international affairs and the Henry R. Luce Director of the Whitney and Betty MacMillan Center for International and Area Studies. His research interests include transnational migration in South and Southeast Asia.

== Biography ==
Amrith was born in Nairobi, Kenya, to Indian parents. His father was a banker and his mother an eye surgeon. Amrith was raised and educated in Singapore after his parents moved there in 1980. He completed a BA (2000) and a PhD (2005) at the University of Cambridge. His PhD supervisor was Emma Rothschild.

From 2006 to 2015, Amrith taught modern Asian history at Birkbeck, University of London. In 2015, he moved to the United States and became a professor of South Asian history at Harvard University. He also co-directed the Joint Center for History and Economics between Harvard and the University of Cambridge and was interim director of Harvard's Mahindra Humanities Center (2019–2020).

In 2020, Yale University announced Amrith's appointment as the Dhawan Professor of History. In March 2025, he became the Henry R. Luce Director of Yale's Whitney and Betty MacMillan Center for International and Area Studies.

Amrith is a member of the advisory board of Capitalism: A Journal of History and Economics and the editorial board of Modern Asian Studies.

Amrith resides with his wife, British barrister and Harvard University lecturer Ruth Coffey, and their two children in Hamden, Connecticut.

== Awards ==
- 2014 American Historical Association's John F. Richards prize for Crossing the Bay of Bengal
- 2016 Infosys Prize in Humanities for contributions to the fields of the history of migration, environmental history, the history of international public health, and the history of contemporary Asia
- 2017 MacArthur Fellowship
- 2019: shortlisted for the Cundill History Prize for his book Unruly Waters, which studies the influence of water on the political and economic development of the Indian subcontinent
- 2022 Dr A.H. Heineken Prize for History to honour "his search for the historical origins of the great inequality that exists between and within countries"
- 2022 Falling Walls Foundation Science Breakthrough of the Year award for "Breaking the Wall to Reimagining Environmental Justice in [a] Historical Perspective"
- 2024 British Academy Fellowship
- 2024 Fukuoka Academic Prize for being an "outstanding historian of Asia"
- 2025 Toynbee Prize for his "wide-ranging and ambitious scholarship"
- 2025 British Academy Book Prize for his "magisterial" and "beautifully written" book The Burning Earth: An Environmental History of the Last 500 Years
- 2025 Dayton Literary Peace Prize for The Burning Earth

== Works ==
- Amrith, Sunil S. (2006). Decolonizing International Health: India and Southeast Asia, 1930–65. Cambridge Imperial and Post-Colonial Studies. Basingstoke: Palgrave Macmillan. ISBN 9781403985934.
- Amrith, Sunil S. (2011). Migration and Diaspora in Modern Asia. Cambridge University Press. ISBN 9780521727020.
- Amrith, Sunil S. (2013). Crossing the Bay of Bengal: The Furies of Nature and the Fortunes of Migrants. Cambridge, Massachusetts: Harvard University Press. ISBN 9780674287242.
- Harper, Tim N.; Amrith, Sunil S., eds. (2014). Sites of Asian Interaction: Ideas, Networks and Mobility. Cambridge University Press. doi:10.1017/CBO9781139979474. ISBN 9781139979474.
- Amrith, Sunil S. (2018). Unruly Waters: How Rains, Rivers, Coasts and Seas Have Shaped Asia's History. New York: Basic Books. ISBN 9780465097739.
- Amrith, Sunil S. (2024). The Burning Earth: A History. W. W. Norton & Company.
