= Daniel Beer =

British historian

- Born: 1973 (age 52–53)
- Awards: Cundill History Prize

Academic work
- Discipline: Historian
- Institutions: Royal Holloway
- Notable works: The House of the Dead

Daniel Beer (born 1973) is a British historian and Professor of Modern History at Royal Holloway, University of London. His book, The House of the Dead, won the 2017 Cundill History Prize and was shortlisted for the Wolfson History Prize.

== Selected publications ==
- Renovating Russia: The Human Sciences and the Fate of Liberal Modernity, 1880–1930. Cornell University Press, 2008. ISBN 978-0801446276
- The House of the Dead: Siberian Exile Under the Tsars. Allen Lane, 2016. ISBN 978-1846145377
