= The Perfection of Nature =

2022 book by Mackenzie Cooley

The Perfection of Nature: Animals, Breeding, and Race in the Renaissance
- Cover
- Author: Mackenzie Cooley
- Language: English
- Subject: History of science, Renaissance history, animal breeding, race (human categorization), the Spanish Empire
- Genre: Historical study
- Publisher: University of Chicago Press
- Publication date: October 26, 2022 (paperback); November 4, 2022 (hardcover)
- Publication place: United States
- Pages: 344
- Awards: MLA Aldo and Jeanne Scaglione Prize, Honorable Mention (2023); Cundill History Prize, Shortlist (2023)
- ISBN: 978-0-226-82228-0

The Perfection of Nature: Animals, Breeding, and Race in the Renaissance is a 2022 monograph by American historian Mackenzie Cooley. Cooley traces how the concept of race developed from animal breeding practices in Renaissance Italy and the Spanish Empire during the fifteenth, sixteenth, and early seventeenth centuries. The author argues that the term razza, originally used to describe selectively bred animal lineages, gradually extended to human populations through the convergence of breeding knowledge, colonial encounters, and religious debates about human difference. Based on archival research in breeding records, natural histories, and court documents from Europe and the Americas, the work examines how Renaissance breeders, courts, and naturalists created categories of difference that would shape modern racial thinking. The author was awarded the 2025 Dan David Prize, received an honorable mention for the 2023 MLA Aldo and Jeanne Scaglione Prize for Comparative Literary Studies, and was shortlisted for the 2023 Cundill History Prize, among other awards.

== Author and background ==
Mackenzie Cooley is an Associate Professor of History and Director of Medieval and Renaissance Studies at Hamilton College. She received her Bachelor of Arts from Cornell University and Masters and Doctorate from Stanford University. As an intellectual historian, her work explores the relationship between humans and the natural world—and how this relationship informs and mediates early modern developments in natural history, scientific inquiry, and colonial expansion. Her work has been supported by the Mellon Foundation, the Fulbright Commission, and Villa I Tatti, the Harvard University Center for Italian Renaissance Studies.

For The Perfection of Nature, her first monograph, Cooley traced the use and evolution of the term razza. In a 2022 interview on the New Books Network, she explained that the word appeared in multiple European languages by the sixteenth century—razza in Italian, raza in Spanish, and eventually race in English—but was not exclusively used for animals or humans. Rather, it "slips from describing animals to describing humans" while carrying additional connotations, including metallurgical meanings where razza referred to imperfections. For Cooley, razza registers coeval concerns with inheritance, the boundary between human and animal, and the desire to control nature.

As Cooley explained in the interview, the book emerged from her attempt to understand why animal breeders adopted this particular term and "what their use of this word did for the modern history of race." Part of her research focused on Renaissance horse breeding, which she noted experienced "a real crescendo in interest" as early modern culture maintained medieval chivalric ideals of masculinity centered on "a knight on a great steed." However, Cooley does not limit her scope of study to Europe; instead, she puts early modern European theories of species difference in conversation with Indigenous American breeding practices. Through these parallels, The Perfection of Nature reveals the fluid deployment of razza across the Spanish Empire, and implicates early modern breeding practices and their attendant theories of perfection in the development of modern notions of racial difference and purity.

The Perfection of Nature contributes to and complicates prevailing theories about the history of race and the ways to best characterize the relationship between European colonial empires and Indigenous peoples. Cooley argues that modern conceptions of race derive significantly from early modern discussions surrounding species difference, reproduction, and inheritance. She also draws attention to the similarities between European and Indigenous breeding practices, understanding both parties as co-producers and practitioners of "racialized" thinking. The work thus recognizes the compatibility between European and Indigenous peoples in how they related to and attempted to control nature.

== Summary ==
Cooley traces how the concept of race emerged from animal breeding practices in Renaissance Italy and the Spanish Empire, demonstrating that the term razza initially described carefully maintained animal lineages before gradually extending to human populations. The book opens with Tommaso Campanella's 1602 utopian text The City of the Sun, which imagined human reproduction controlled like animal breeding programs, establishing a central tension: while the Renaissance celebrated individual self-fashioning, it simultaneously developed biological theories that constrained human potential.

The work documents how Renaissance breeders understood themselves as natural philosophers, developing theories of inheritance through hands-on work with horses, dogs, and livestock. Breeding treatises treated animal generation as knowledge production, with artisans recording minute details about which stallions covered which mares, the physical characteristics of offspring, and the unpredictability of family resemblances. Branding emerged as a crucial technology for making razze visible and permanent—noble families burned their coats of arms onto horses' flanks to indicate lineage and quality, practices that would later mark enslaved humans as property in colonial slave markets.

Cooley contrasts breeding cultures across continents. The Gonzaga court of Mantua operated extensive breeding programs, importing horses from the Ottoman Empire, North Africa, and across Europe to create distinctive Mantuan razze. Isabella d'Este, the Marchioness of Mantua, collected not only animals but also humans—particularly people with dwarfism and Black children acquired through Mediterranean slave networks. She referred to her "raza delli mei nanini" (race of little dwarves) and attempted to breed them, revealing how elite families applied the same logic to human and nonhuman bodies. In parallel, Mesoamerican peoples had spent millennia selectively breeding maize, transforming teosinte into hundreds of varieties through the concept of xinachtli (seed), which encompassed plant, animal, and human generation within a unified framework distinct from European approaches.

The Spanish conquest created unprecedented encounters between breeding systems. Dogs became a focal point for theorizing mixture: Spanish observers struggled to categorize indigenous hairless dogs (xoloitzcuintli) and their crosses with European breeds, developing vocabularies of mestizaje that would later describe human racial mixing. Andean camelids posed theological problems—were llamas and alpacas descended from Old World camels that had degenerated in the Americas, or were they separate creations? Such questions forced European naturalists to develop migration theories and population thinking to reconcile New World biodiversity with biblical narratives of Noah's ark.

The book examines how animal breeding shaped theories of human difference through two key figures. José de Acosta, a Jesuit naturalist, developed hierarchical classifications of "barbarians" based on cultural achievements that paralleled his animal taxonomies. Though he sorted peoples into categories from the literate Chinese to supposedly savage groups "close to beasts," Acosta maintained that all humans possessed souls capable of Christian conversion. Giovanni Battista della Porta advanced physiognomy—the practice of reading character from physical features—arguing that humans who resembled certain animals shared their temperaments. His widely circulated works provided a pseudo-scientific framework for interpreting human nature through animal analogies.

Cooley argues that Renaissance race emerged from multiple, sometimes contradictory sources rather than a single origin. Classical philosophy provided theories of natural hierarchy, Christian theology demanded explanations for human diversity, Islamic agricultural texts offered practical breeding knowledge, and indigenous American systems demonstrated alternative approaches to managing heredity. The Spanish Empire's global reach enabled unprecedented comparisons across populations, while colonization pressures demanded new frameworks for categorizing and controlling diverse peoples. The concept of limpieza de sangre (blood purity), originally used to exclude converted Jews and Muslims from positions in Spanish society, merged with breeding metaphors imported from animal husbandry.

== Critical reception ==
Alexander Bevilacqua in the London Review of Books traced the disturbing parallels between animal breeding and human categorization in Renaissance courts. He focused particularly on Isabella d'Este's collection of humans alongside her animal razze, quoting her reference to her "raza delli mei nanini" and comparing this to the humanist Nicolas Clenardus who taught his three enslaved Black servants—Carbo, Dento, and Nigrinus—to perform tricks like pets. Bevilacqua emphasized Cooley's finding that European breeders, despite their elaborate record-keeping and breeding programs, "weren't great theorists," remaining divided over whether nature or nurture determined animal quality. He highlighted the book's documentation of how animal branding extended to human slaves, citing Francesco Carletti's 1594 observation in Cape Verde of enslaved people marked like livestock, where "each owner makes a mark on each slave."

Allison Margaret Bigelow called it "a first-rate work of scholarship" that succeeds in connecting disparate materials from Italy, Spain, and Latin America without falling into simplistic comparisons. Bigelow praised Cooley's method of "suggestive juxtaposition" that reveals how scientific experimentation and institutional power converged to produce theories of heritability and race. She thought the book demonstrates how knowledge about plant and animal breeding was repurposed to understand human difference, moving from "judgment-neutral collections in Mexican palaces and Italian villas to the racial capitalist structures that underwrote European imperialism."

Brian J. Maxson argued that the book reveals a Renaissance world where "ideas about race and the implications of breeding were complex and fluid when applied to animals, yet rarely developed when applied to people." Maxson found that Cooley's examination of breeding records from Mantua and Naples shows breeders accepting that "family resemblances held sometimes but not always in breeding interactions," contradicting any notion of fixed heredity. He praised the book's structure, noticing that chapters read "almost like essays on themes," which reinforces the argument about the fluidity rather than fixity of early racial thinking. He wrote: "The Perfection of Nature is an important study with which a wide range of subfields will grapple for years to come".

In her review, Christine Lehleiter focused on the book's documentation of artisanal knowledge. Lehleiter observed that stable masters and breeders produced extensive records yet rarely considered the "abstract implications of their work." She emphasized how branding evolved from a practical tool for claiming ownership into an attempt to "stabilize the relationship between individual animals and the quality they were supposed to represent." Lehleiter noted that this semiotics became especially problematic when applied to human beings in the slave trade, where brands marked not razza but "the brute fact of ownership."

Helen Cowie praised Cooley's use of Mexican codices, Jesuit natural histories, and Italian horse-training manuals to construct a nuanced argument about breeding and race. Cowie highlighted her demonstration of how "notions of lineage and pedigree forged in the stables could, without too much difficulty, be extrapolated to the court or the plantation." Cowie pointed out to the Spanish colonists' categorization of llamas as "sheep of Peru" and the Nahua classification of horses as "deer" (mamazah), showing how different cultures mapped new animals onto familiar categories.

Ian Campbell found Cooley "very skeptical of any direct transition between animal raza or lineage and human race," noting that breeding records reveal no coherent theory of heredity but rather practical acceptance of unpredictability. Campbell argued that the Gonzaga's book of palio victories "focused on the characteristics and virtues of champion horses but not on the purity of their descent." He suggested that theological concerns about free will and original sin prevented strong doctrines of heredity from developing into systematic racial ideology until the eighteenth century, when Carl Linnaeus created classifications "framed by a science that denied the human ability to perceive essences."

Kristen Guest commended Cooley's "contrapuntal method" that juxtaposes European and New World breeding practices to reveal their fundamental differences. Guest highlighted how the book places Galenian and geohumoral theories alongside "alternative approaches focusing on natural magic and animal imagination," showing that breeders like Giovanni Battista della Porta believed they could influence offspring by decorating stables with colorful tapestries or painting white mares black. Guest thought that the book "suggestively connects Renaissance thought to concepts such as eugenics or branding that are typically associated with the post-Enlightenment era."

Neil Tarrant situated the work within Renaissance Spain and its empire, from the Kingdom of Naples to the Americas, showing how metropolitan breeding practices were transformed through colonial encounters. Tarrant highlighted how Cooley traces breeding knowledge through both practical application and theoretical development, hence revealing how "the relationship between metropole and colonies mediated the creation of new knowledge."

In her review, Sabina Brevaglieri observed how breeding created both cross-cultural parallels and "complex translations across an entangled Atlantic," with Nahuatl agricultural techniques being reframed through European concepts of natural difference. Brevaglieri believed that "nature did not simply mix" but underwent transformations that challenged European categories, more so in Rome where racial thinking intersected with papal politics and Jesuit debates over conversion and blood purity.

In her review of the book in German, Maike Schmidt praised the book and called it a "source-saturated" work that reveals how discourses about nature versus nurture led to obsessive classification, and noted that "the boundary between the human and non-human blurred when lineage in the sense of descent was discussed." Schmidt appreciated the rich intellectual content but criticized Cooley's casual references to eugenics for creating "irritating resonances" between pre-modern and modern worlds. She questioned whether Isabella d'Este truly pursued a breeding program with court dwarfs comparable to her husband's horse breeding simply because she used the phrase "razza delle nanni" in one letter. Despite these concerns, Schmidt deemed it as "an immensely rich and intellectually stimulating study" valuable for knowledge history, environmental history, and animal history.

Amanda L. Scott called the work "much more than a history of animals and animal breeding" but rather a provocative exploration of how Renaissance ideas about controlling animal stock expanded into concepts of race throughout the Spanish empire. Scott praised Cooley's skill in guiding readers through rich anecdotes about Renaissance thinkers "from Jesuits to magi to royal physicians," based on an impressive range of sources housed in collections across Italy, Austria, Mexico, and Spain. She also commended the book's treatment of mestizaje, stressing how European dogs bred for herding made little sense in the Americas while small Mesoamerican dogs raised for food had no European equivalent, and how llamas "raised all sorts of conceptual and semantic problems for Europeans." Scott considered the book "a pleasure to read," a work that represents "a model of how to make the past resonate with the present."

In a 2025 New York Review of Books essay, historian David A. Bell referenced Cooley's work in his review of William Max Nelson's Enlightenment Biopolitics. Bell characterized the book as a study of race and animal breeding in the Renaissance, mentioning Cooley's analysis of a 1602 utopian novel by a Dominican friar featuring the Solarians, an imaginary society that criticized Europeans for their careful breeding of animals while neglecting human reproduction. Bell suggested that Cooley's research revealed important precedents for later Enlightenment thinking about human improvement and eugenics, arguing that scholars of eighteenth-century biopolitics should consider how Renaissance-era works might have influenced Enlightenment thinkers, despite differences in their conceptual frameworks regarding biological systems.

== Recognition ==
=== Honorable mentions and shortlists ===
- Honorable Mention, Morris D. Forkosch Book Prize 2023 for the Journal of the History of Ideas
- Honorable Mention, Aldo and Jeanne Scaglione Prize for Comparative Literary Studies 2023 Book Award, Modern Languages Association
- Shortlist, 2023 Cundill History Prize
- Shortlist, 2023 Society for the History of Natural History, Book Prize (Thackray Medal)
