= In the Forest of No Joy =

2021 history book by J. P. Daughton

In the Forest of No Joy: The Congo–Océan Railroad and the Tragedy of French Colonialism is a 2021 non-fiction book by American historian J. P. Daughton. The book reconstructs the planning and construction of the Congo–Ocean Railway (1921–1934) in French Equatorial Africa by Société de Construction des Batignolles on behalf of France, arguing that the project depended on paid albeit coercive labor regimes and resulted in high mortality while being justified by contemporaries in terms of “progress” and development. Daughton argues that the French colonial administration, aided by sympathetic metropolitan media, downplayed worker mortality and harsh conditions during the railway’s construction.

== Background and publication ==
Daughton, a Professor of History at Stanford University, based the study on French and Congolese government archives, company records, and period reports. The hardcover edition was published by W. W. Norton & Company in July 2021; a U.S. paperback followed on 28 March 2023. An unabridged audiobook narrated by William DeMeritt was released on 20 July 2021.

== Contents ==
Daughton examines how the railway from Brazzaville to the Atlantic was built using forced labor, inadequate supplies, limited machinery, and widespread violence. The book has three sections: the colonial context and ideology, the grim realities of recruitment, work, resistance, and death at the site, and the political denial from the metropolitan government. It argues that this tragedy resulted not only from racist colonial views but also from administrative failures and a lack of accountability. The author shows how officials depicted disaster as progress, obscuring casualties through bureaucratic and media strategies. Daughton claims that the railway project revealed administrative and moral shortcomings rather than showcasing the colonial state’s ability to promote development.

== Reception ==
Writing in Foreign Affairs, Nicolas van de Walle, states that "Relying on journalistic accounts from the period and the excellent use of archival materials... [the] book paints a vivid picture of colonialism in central Africa."

In a positive review, Deborah Neill states that the In The Forest of No Joy's arguments "can also be applied beyond colonial empires, speaking to histories of labor abuses in large-scale modernizing projects in a variety of places and systems".

In a 2022 review for the Journal of Transport History, Gordon Pirie noted that the book significantly enhances understanding of the thirteen-year project from 1921 to 1934. Pirie lauds Daughton's use of a broad array of surviving sources, including accounts, drawings, diagrams, photographs, reports, marginal notes, memoirs, letters, and testimonies. These materials were gathered from various libraries and the archives of the Batignolles engineering company and the colonial governor’s office in Brazzaville.

Nina Kleinöder’s review of In the Forest of No Joy highlights the book’s reconstruction of the Congo–Océan Railroad project as both a history of individual suffering and a study of the long silence that followed it. The reviewer appreciates the study's rich details, its focus on the agency of African actors, and its relevance beyond this specific railway, highlighting the role of infrastructure in colonial governance.

According to Didier Gondola, the book presents a detailed history that illustrates how the Congo–Océan railroad represented the creation of the modern world through racial capitalism and colonial violence. Gondola states the book challenges the old idea that French rule was humane while Belgian rule was brutal and how France’s concessionary system led to forced conscription across French Equatorial Africa, transport in chains, deadly labor in the Mayombe forest, and mass death. Société des Batignolles, prioritized profits by avoiding mechanization and neglecting workers. Disease was widespread, and Gondola emphasizes how the book discusses research connecting early HIV-1 transmission to these labor camps. While appreciating the archival recovery of a “forgotten” atrocity and condemning colonial exploitation, the reviewer critiques Daughton for emphasizing the insubordination of Chinese laborers and discussions in the capital over Governor General Antonetti. The reviewer feels that he downplays African resistance, particularly the Matswa movement, but still considers the book a significant contribution.
