= Marla R. Miller =

American historian

Marla R. Miller is an American public historian.

== Career ==
Miller's scholarship focuses on the work of women in the United States prior to industrialization, with a focus on material culture and craft. She holds a PhD from the University of North Carolina at Chapel Hill. Miller is well known for her work on Betsy Ross which challenges popular narratives about Ross' involvement with the creation of the United States flag.

Miller served from 2001 to 2021 as the Director of the Public History Program at the University of Massachusetts Amherst. Miller was elected vice president/president elect of the National Council on Public History Board of Directors in 2016. Her term as NCPH president concluded in 2020. She is a speaker in the Organization of American Historians Distinguished Lectureship Program.

In addition to her academic work Miller has worked as both an editor and a public history consultant. She has sat on the editorial board of The Public Historian, Journal of the Early Republic, and the New England Quarterly. She is the founding editor of the University of Massachusetts Press series "Public History in Historical Perspective." Miller's co-authored 2012 report Imperiled Promise: The State of History in the National Park Service which won the National Council on Public History prize for Excellence in Consulting in 2013.

== Publications ==
- The Needle's Eye: Women and Work in the Age of Revolution, University of Massachusetts Press, August 2006.
- Editor. Cultivating a Past: Essays in the History of Hadley, Massachusetts, University of Massachusetts Press, 2009.
- Betsy Ross and the Making of America, Holt, 2010.
- University of Massachusetts Amherst: A Campus Guide. Princeton: Princeton Architectural Press, 2013; with Max Page.
- Rebecca Dickinson (Lives of American Women series). Boulder, CO: Westview Press/Perseus, 2013.
- Co-Editor with Max Page, Bending the Future: Fifty Ideas for the Next Fifty Years of Historic Preservation in the United States, University of Massachusetts Press, 2016.
- Entangled Lives: Labor, Livelihood, and Landscapes of Change in Rural Massachusetts, Johns Hopkins University Press, 2019.

== Awards ==
- Costume Society of America's Millia Davenport Publication Award for the best book in the field, 2007. For The Needle's Eye
- H.F. DuPont Winterthur Museum and Library research fellowship, 2008
- Patrick Henry Fellowship, C.V. Starr Center for the American Experience, 2009-10
- Finalist, Cundill Prize in History at McGill University, 2010. For Betsy Ross and the Making of America.
- Strickland Distinguished Visiting Scholar, Middle Tennessee State University, 2012
- Samuel F. Conti Faculty Fellowship, UMass Amherst, 2014-2015
