= Fifth Sun: A New History of the Aztecs =

2019 book by historian Camilla Townsend

- Author: Camilla Townsend
- Language: English
- Publisher: Oxford University Press
- Publication date: 2019

Fifth Sun: A New History of the Aztecs is a 2019 book by American historian Camilla Townsend. The book utilizes indigenous, as opposed to European, sources to tell the history of Aztec civilization. The book won the 2020 Cundill History Prize.

== Writing and composition ==
Townsend was inspired to write the book while working on another work about histories written in Nahuatl. In writing the book, Townsend aimed to convey that Aztec life, though changed, continued after Spanish conquest.

== Reception ==
=== Critical reception ===
David Stuart, in a review published by The Wall Street Journal, praised the book as a "vivid account of what Aztec writers and chroniclers had to say about their own history". Stuart further praised the book as "bridging of the cultures of Aztec literary history both before and after the coming of the Spanish" rather than operating as a more straightforward history. Christopher Wooley, in a review published by the journal The Latin Americanist, praised the book as "extraordinary" and emphasized its accessibility to a broad audience.

J. H. Elliott reviewed Fifth Sun and the book The Aztecs by Frances F. Berdan in The New York Review of Books. Elliott praised both writers for "style and verve" but also faulted them for not "[being] more generous in their acknowledgment of the pioneering work of predecessors like León-Portilla and Soustell".

=== Honors ===
The book won the 2020 Cundill History Prize.
