= Gary J. Bass =

American professor of politics and international affairs

- Occupations: Professor, academic, reporter

Academic background
- Education: Harvard University (BA, PhD)

Academic work
- Discipline: International Relations
- Sub-discipline: International security, human rights, international justice, international law
- Institutions: Princeton University

Gary Jonathan Bass is an American historian, academic, and author, specializing in international security, international law, and human rights. He is the William P. Boswell Professor of World Politics of Peace and War at Princeton University, where he has taught since 1999. Bass earned his Bachelor of Arts and PhD from Harvard University, where he wrote for The Harvard Crimson. He has authored four books, including The Blood Telegram: Nixon, Kissinger, and a Forgotten Genocide, a Pulitzer Prize finalist. His most recent work, Judgment at Tokyo: World War II on Trial and the Making of Modern Asia, has received widespread acclaim and was shortlisted for major literary awards. Bass has also contributed to numerous publications, including The New York Times and The Economist.

== Early life and education ==
Bass graduated from Harvard University in 1992 with a Bachelor of Arts. While at Harvard, he wrote for The Harvard Crimson. After college, he worked as a reporter for The Economist doing journalism in Washington, D.C. He went back to Harvard for graduate education, receiving a PhD in 1998. He was a fellow at Harvard’s Center for International Affairs.

== Academia and awards ==
Bass has taught at Princeton University since 1999 and is the William P. Boswell Professor of World Politics of Peace and War professor since 2023. He specializes in international security, international law and human rights and teaches politics and international relations.

Bass has authored four books. His first book, Stay the Hand of Venegeance: The Politics of War Crimes Tribunals, was published in 2000. Published in 2008, his second book, Freedom's Battle: The Origins of Humanitarian Intervention, was placed on The New York Times 100 Notable Books of 2008 and The Washington Post's Best Books of 2008.

Published in 2013, his third book, The Blood Telegram: Nixon, Kissinger, and a Forgotten Genocide, covered the Bangladesh genocide. The book received critical aclaim, becoming a Pulitzer prize non-fiction finalist in 2014. It was also award the Arthur Ross Book Award from the Council on Foreign Relations, the Lionel Gelber Prize, the Cundill Prize in Historical Literature, and the 2013 Ramnath Goenka Award.

Bass published his fourth book, Judgment at Tokyo: World War II on Trial and the Making of Modern Asia in 2023. It was placed on best books lists for The New York Times, The Washington Post, The New Yorker, The Economist, Foreign Affairs, and other publications. It was longlisted for the Baillie Gifford Prize and was a finalist for the Cundill History Prize and the Mark Lynton History Prize.

== Other work ==
He has written for The New York Times, The New Yorker, The Washington Post, The Atlantic, The Los Angeles Times, The Boston Globe, Foreign Affairs, and other publications.

== Bibliography ==
=== Books ===
- Bass, Gary (2023). Judgment at Tokyo: World War II on Trial and the Making of Modern Asia. New York: Alfred A. Knopf. ISBN 978-1-101-94710-4.
- ————— (2013). The Blood Telegram: Nixon, Kissinger, and a Forgotten Genocide. New York: Alfred A. Knopf. ISBN 978-0-307-70020-9.
- ————— (2008). Freedom's Battle: The Origins of Humanitarian Intervention. New York: Alfred A. Knopf. ISBN 978-0-307-26648-4.
- ————— (2000). Stay the Hand of Vengeance: The Politics of War Crimes Tribunals. Princeton: Princeton University Press. ISBN 978-0-691-04922-9.

=== Selected publications ===
- Bass, Gary (Autumn 2004). "Just Post Bellum". Philosophy & Public Affairs. 32 (4): 384–412.
- —————. "The Indian Way of Humanitarian Intervention" (PDF). Yale Journal of International Law. 40 (2): 227–94.
