= The Second Founding =

2019 non-fiction book by Eric Foner

- Image of book cover
- Author: Eric Foner
- Audio read by: Donald Corren
- Subject: American history
- Genre: Non-fiction
- Set in: U.S. Civil War period and its aftermath
- Publisher: W.W. Norton & Company
- Publication date: 2019
- Publication place: United States
- Media type: Print, e-audio, CD
- ISBN: 978-0-393-65258-1

The Second Founding: How the Civil War and Reconstruction Remade the Constitution is a non-fiction book written by Eric Foner and published by W. W. Norton & Company in 2019. The book recounts the history of the three Reconstruction era amendments to the U.S. Constitution—the 13th, 14th and 15th—and the determined efforts by the U.S. Supreme Court and certain states to undermine the amendments, in particular, the right of all Americans to vote and enjoy full citizenship. As Foner summarized it in a New York Times essay:

The amendments had flaws. The 13th allowed involuntary servitude to continue for people convicted of crime, inadvertently opening the door to the creation of a giant system of convict labor. The 14th mandated that a state would lose part of its representation in the House of Representatives if it barred groups of men from voting but imposed no penalty if it disenfranchised women. The 15th allowed states to limit citizens' right to vote for reasons other than race.

Nonetheless, the amendments should be seen not simply as changes to an existing structure but as a second American founding, which created a fundamentally new Constitution.

Foner's book also argues that this late 19th century period in U.S. history is still relevant to the present day.

== Awards ==
- Longlisted for the Cundill History Prize

== See also ==
- African American founding fathers of the United States
