= Henrietta Harrison =

British historian, sinologist and academic

Henrietta Harrison FBA
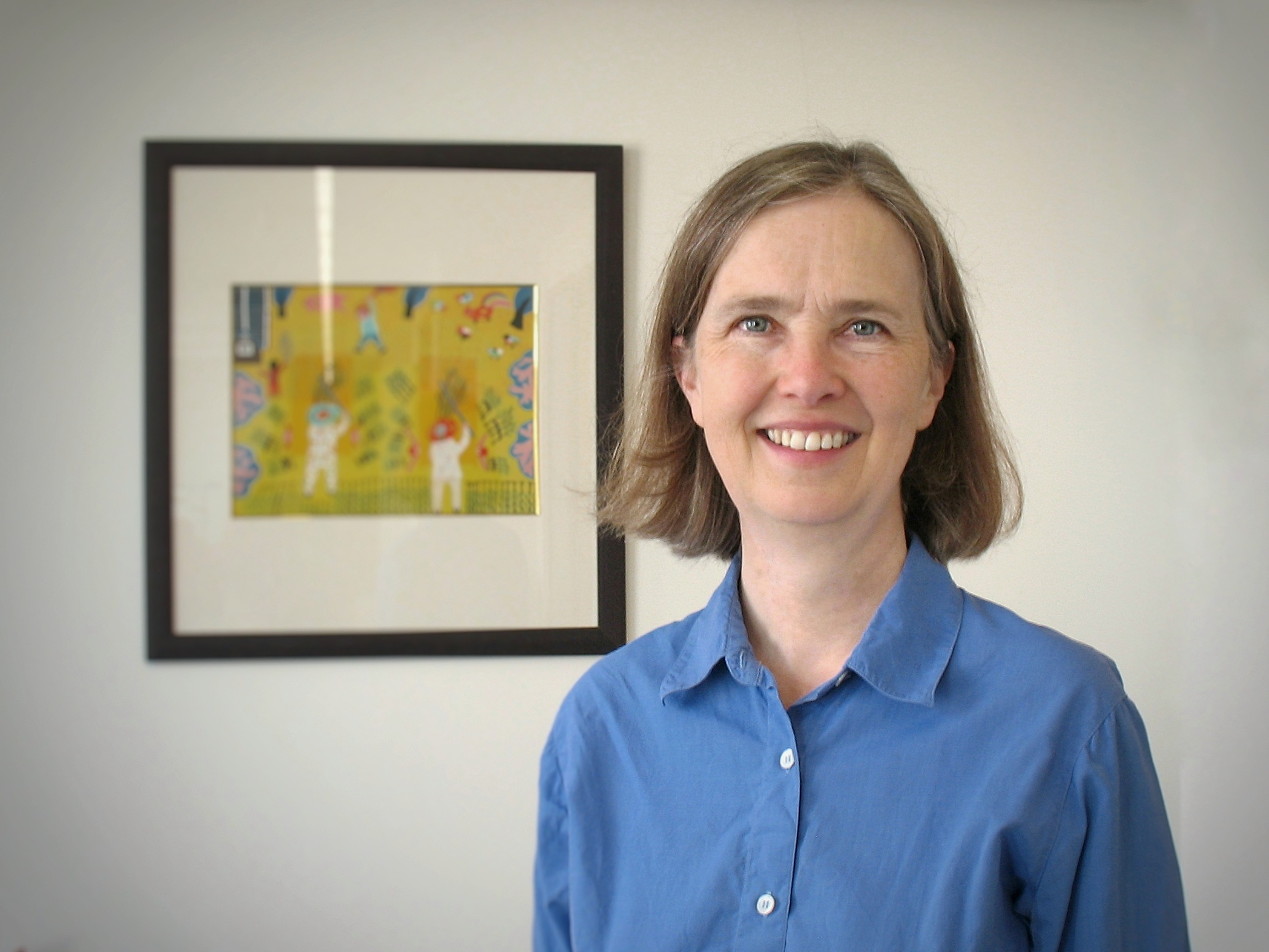
- Born: 1967 (age 58–59); London, England

Academic background
- Education: Newnham College, Cambridge; Harvard University; St Antony's College, Oxford
- Thesis: State ceremonies and political symbolism in China, 1911-1929 (1996)
- Doctoral advisor: Glen Dudbridge & David Faure

Academic work
- Discipline: History
- Sub-discipline: Sinology; History of Modern China
- Institutions: St Anne's College, Oxford; University of Leeds; Harvard University; University of Oxford; St Cross College, Oxford; Pembroke College, Oxford

Henrietta Katherine Harrison, FBA (born 1967) is a British historian, sinologist, and academic. Since 2012, she has been Professor of Modern Chinese Studies at the University of Oxford. She was previously a junior research fellow at St Anne's College, Oxford (1996–1998), a lecturer in Chinese at the University of Leeds (1999–2006), and a professor at Harvard University (2006–2012).

== Early life and education ==
Harrison was born in 1967 in London, England. She was educated at St Paul's Girls' School, an independent school in Hammersmith, London. She studied at Newnham College, Cambridge (BA 1989), Harvard University (MA 1992) and St Antony's College, Oxford (DPhil 1996). Her doctoral thesis was titled "State ceremonies and political symbolism in China, 1911-1929".

== Academic career ==
She was a junior research fellow at St Anne's College, Oxford (1996–1998), a lecturer in Chinese at the University of Leeds (1999–2006), and a professor of history at Harvard University (2006–2012). Since 2012, she has been Professor of Modern Chinese Studies at the University of Oxford. She has also been a Fellow of Pembroke College, Oxford since 2015, and was previously a Fellow of St Cross College, Oxford (2012–2015).

Harrison works mainly on the social and cultural history of China from the Qing through to the present, especially rural north China, links between transnational and local history, religion, diplomacy and revolution.

== Honours and recognition ==
In 2014, Harrison was elected a Fellow of the British Academy (FBA), the United Kingdom's national academy for the humanities and social sciences.

Her book, The Perils of Interpreting, won the 2022 Kenshur Prize for best book in Eighteenth-Century Studies, and was shortlisted for the 2022 Cundill Prize and the 2023 Wolfson History Prize.

== Selected works ==
- Harrison, Henrietta (2000). The Making of the Republican Citizen: Political Ceremonies and Symbols in China, 1911-1929. Oxford: Oxford University Press. ISBN 978-0198295198.
- Harrison, Henrietta (2001). China: Inventing the Nation. London: Hodder Arnold. ISBN 978-0340741337.
- Harrison, Henrietta (2001). Natives of Formosa, British Reports of the Taiwan Indigenous People, 1650-1950. Taipei: Shung Ye Museum of Formosan Aborigines. ISBN 978-9579976794.
- Harrison, Henrietta (2005). The Man Awakened from Dreams: One Man's Life in a North China Village, 1857-1942. Palo Alto, CA: Stanford University Press. ISBN 978-0804750684.
- Harrison, Henrietta (2013). The Missionary's Curse and Other Tales from a Chinese Catholic Village. Berkeley, CA: University of California Press. ISBN 978-0520273115.
- Harrison, Henrietta (2021). The Perils of Interpreting: The Extraordinary Lives of Two Translators between Qing China and the British Empire. Princeton, NJ: Princeton University Press. ISBN 978-0691225456.
