= Beth Lew-Williams =

American academic

Elizabeth Lew-Williams is a historian and professor of Asian American history at Princeton University, the first ever appointed by the school. Her research focuses on Asian American studies, migration, ethnic studies, violence, and the history of the U.S. West.

== Biography ==
Lew-Williams received a Ph.D. in history from Stanford University in 2010. Her dissertation was titled The Chinese Must Go: Immigration, Deportation, and Violence in the American West, 1882-1892.

In 2012, Lew-Williams became a faculty fellow at Northwestern University. She is the author of The Chinese Must Go: Violence, Exclusion and the Making of the Alien in America.

== Recognition ==
In 2025, Lex-Williams received the Dan David Prize for her historical research on race, migration, and the experiences of Chinese immigrants in the United States.

In 2026, Lew-Williams won the Bancroft Prize and the Cundill History Prize for John Doe Chinaman: A Forgotten History of Chinese Life Under American Racial Law.
