= Camilla Townsend =

American historian

Camilla Townsend FBA
- Born: January 29, 1965 (age 61)
- Known for: Aztec history Nahuatl-language historical writing Native Americans in the United States; History of Latin America
- Awards: Guggenheim Fellowship (2010); Beveridge Award (2018); Cundill History Prize (2020); Fellow of the British Academy (2025); American Academy of Arts and Sciences member (2026)

Academic background
- Education: Bryn Mawr College (BA); Rutgers University (PhD)
- Thesis: Doing a day's business in a new nation: A comparative study of daily economic activity in two early republican port towns. Guayaquil, Ecuador, and Baltimore, Maryland, 1820-1835 (1995)
- Doctoral advisor: Samuel L. Baily

Academic work
- Discipline: History
- Institutions: Colgate University; Rutgers University

Camilla Townsend FBA (born January 29, 1965) is an American historian and Board of Governors Distinguished Professor of History at Rutgers University. Her scholarship focuses on Indigenous histories of the Americas, including the Aztecs, Nahuas, Nahuatl-language historical writing, and Algonkian-speaking peoples such as the Powhatan and the Lenape. She is the author of works on Native American history, Latin American history, and Indigenous women in the early Americas. Her book Fifth Sun: A New History of the Aztecs won the 2020 Cundill History Prize.

== Education ==
Townsend attended Stuyvesant High School in New York City. She received a B.A. from Bryn Mawr College in 1985, graduating summa cum laude, and earned a Ph.D. in history from Rutgers University in 1995.

She also studied Nahuatl at the Yale Summer Language Institute in 1998 and 2002. While teaching at Colgate, she enrolled in a summer course of Classical Nahuatl at Yale and became aware of the number of primary and secondary sources available in Nahuatl.

== Career ==
Before beginning her university career, Townsend taught language skills to adult secondary-school students in Philadelphia and Matagalpa, Nicaragua. From 1995 to 2006, she taught history at Colgate University in Hamilton, New York, first as an assistant professor and later as an associate professor. At Colgate, she taught colonial and modern Latin American history.

Townsend joined Rutgers University in 2006 as an associate professor of history. She became professor of history in 2008, distinguished professor of history in 2018, and Board of Governors Distinguished Professor in 2021. Her teaching has included early and modern Native American history, the U.S.–Mexican border, colonial Latin America, early America, and gender.

At Rutgers, Townsend has also held administrative and service roles in the Department of History and in programs related to Latin American and Indigenous studies. She served as associate chair of the Department of History from 2012 to 2014 and has coordinated the Hemispheric Indigenous Studies Working Group through the Center for Latin American Studies. She also contributed to Rutgers' 250th Anniversary Committee on Enslaved and Disenfranchised Populations, where she worked on Native American research.

Townsend has been associated with the Colonial Latin American Review, serving as associate editor from 2004 to 2009 and later on its board of editors. She has also served on committees for the Conference on Latin American History and other scholarly organizations.

== Research ==
Townsend's scholarship focuses on Indigenous histories of the Americas, especially the history of the Aztecs, Nahuas, and Nahuatl-language historical writing. Her work has examined 16th- and 17th-century Nahuatl annals written by Nahua authors after the Spanish conquest. These sources formed part of the basis for her book Fifth Sun: A New History of the Aztecs, which presents Aztec history through Indigenous-language sources and historical traditions.

Her research has also addressed Indigenous history in eastern North America, including Pocahontas and the Powhatan, and the Lenape. Her work on Algonkian-speaking peoples includes Pocahontas and the Powhatan Dilemma and the edited volume On the Turtle's Back: Stories the Lenape Told Their Grandchildren. She has also written on Native women and gender, slavery, race, and economic culture in early Latin American and North American history.

Townsend's publications include studies of Malintzin, Nahua historical traditions, Indigenous women during periods of conquest and colonization, and the relationship between Indigenous-language sources and historical interpretation. Her work has also considered how Indigenous authors preserved historical memory after European colonization.

== Awards and honors ==
- 2006 – Tibesar Prize, Conference on Latin American History
- 2010 – Guggenheim Fellowship
- 2017 – Howard F. Cline Memorial Prize, Conference on Latin American History, for Annals of Native America
- 2017 – Arthur P. Whitaker Prize, Mid-Atlantic Council of Latin American Studies, for Annals of Native America
- 2018 – Beveridge Award, American Historical Association
- 2020 – Cundill History Prize for Fifth Sun: A New History of the Aztecs
- 2023 – Doctor honoris causa, El Colegio de Morelos, Cuernavaca, Mexico
- 2023 – New Jersey Studies Academic Alliance prize for On the Turtle's Back
- 2023 – Inaugural Robert Mortensen Book Prize from Rutgers University Press for On the Turtle's Back
- 2025 – Jay I. Kislak Chair for the Study of the History and Cultures of the Early Americas, John W. Kluge Center at the Library of Congress
- 2025 – Elected an International Fellow of the British Academy
- 2026 – Elected to the American Academy of Arts and Sciences

== Selected publications ==
=== Books ===
- Tales of Two Cities: Race and Economic Culture in Early Republican North and South America (University of Texas Press, 2000)
- Pocahontas and the Powhatan Dilemma (Hill & Wang, 2004)
- Malintzin's Choices: An Indian Woman in the Conquest of Mexico (University of New Mexico Press, 2006); translated as Malintzin: Una mujer indígena en la Conquista de México (Ediciones Era, 2015)
- American Indian History: A Documentary Reader (Wiley-Blackwell, 2009)
- Here in This Year: Seventeenth-Century Nahuatl Annals of the Tlaxcala-Puebla Valley (Stanford University Press, 2010)
- Annals of Native America: How the Indians of Colonial Mexico Kept Their History Alive (Oxford University Press, 2017)
- Fifth Sun: A New History of the Aztecs (Oxford University Press, 2019)
- Indigenous Life After the Conquest: The De la Cruz Family Papers of Colonial Mexico, with Caterina Pizzigoni (Penn State University Press, 2021)
- On the Turtle's Back: Stories the Lenape Told Their Grandchildren, edited with Nicky Michael (Rutgers University Press, 2023)
- The Aztec Myths (Thames & Hudson, 2024)
- How to be Grateful: An Aztec Guide to the Art of Gratitude, edited with Frances Karttunen (Princeton University Press, 2025)
- After the Broken Spears: The Aztecs in the Wake of Conquest, edited with Josh Anthony (Oxford University Press, 2026)
