= I, Too =

1926 poem by Langston Hughes

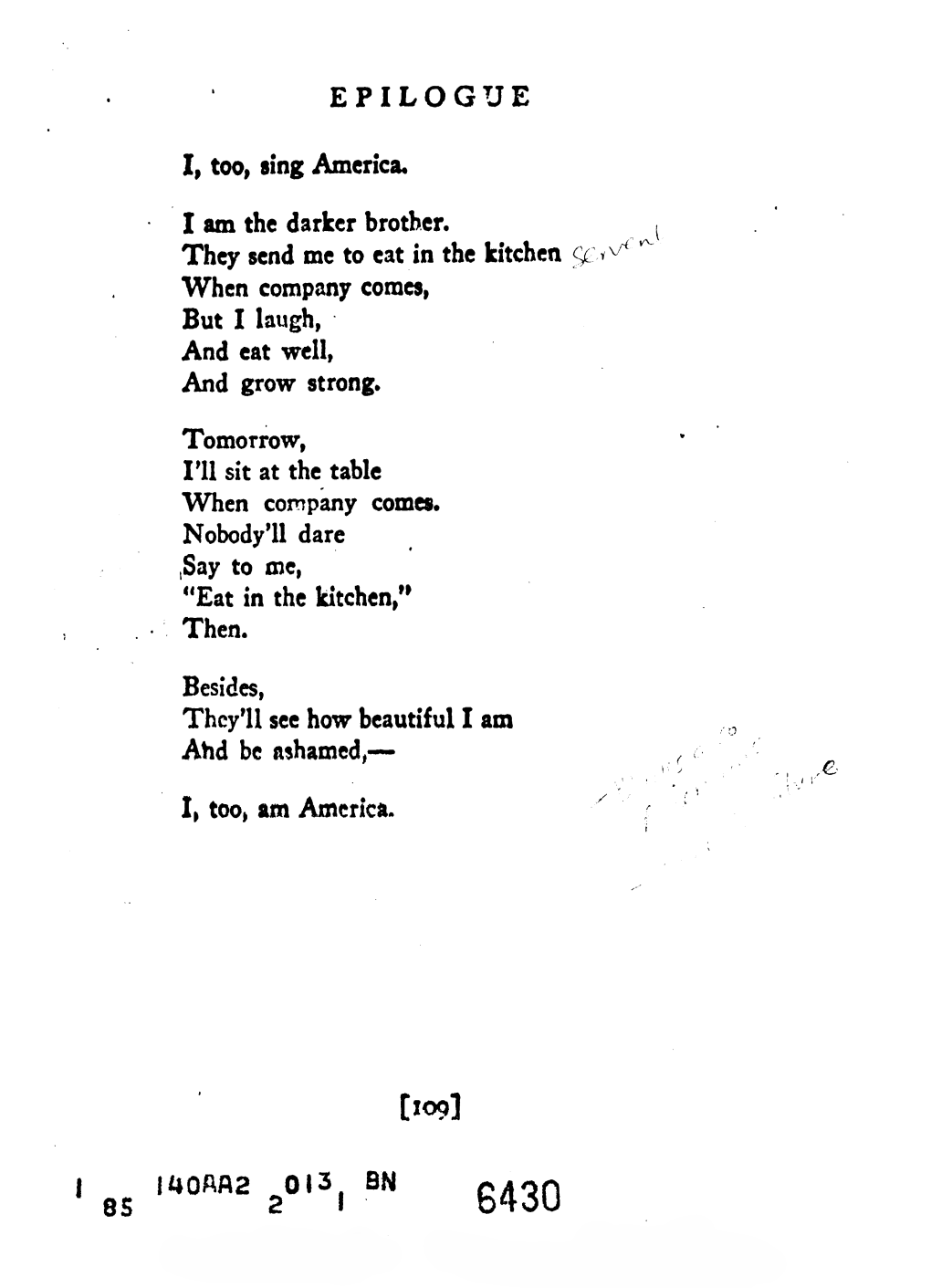
Originally known as "Epilogue"

"I, Too" is a free-verse poem by Langston Hughes that demands equality through patience, endurance, and perseverance while directly challenging systemic racism rooted in the idea that patriotism is limited by race.

The poem shows a craving for equality, endured for far longer than any poem could convey on its own. Hughes’ poems only add to the "poetic tradition" (Nelson. E. S. 2015) of his forefathers, a practice born of generations of African Americans striving to keep their own poetic traditions alive by incorporating their want for equality into poetry and art. A ‘’quest for freedom'’ (Nelson. E. S. 2015), like that seen in multiple pieces of Hughes's work, is a common theme that has characterised African American poetry throughout history. Hughes's poem tackles these issues head-on, from a personal, almost confessional perspective. The poem opens on a domestic scene, emphasising the common place nature of the exclusion that the speaker experiences, being constantly surrounded by actions of discrimination that he cannot escape even within a homely setting. By giving artistic word to the experience faced by hundreds of Black Americans that would have made a large segment of his audience. I, Too adds to a ‘’legacy of poetry… within the larger context of American culture’’, enriching the poetic landscape of America as a whole.

It was first published in the March 1925 issue of Survey Graphic and then collected in Hughes' first volume of poetry, The Weary Blues, in 1926. This poem, along with other works by Hughes, …helped keep the fire of the Harlem Renaissance, and by extension, resurgence of black culture, lit well into the present. Many academics have recognised the effects of literature produced specifically within the Harlem Renaissance, with contemporary scholars commenting on the way it has influenced the attitudes and discussions of modern day discussion surrounding the movement. The poem itself seems to almost prophetically acknowledge this in its’ dwellings on the future and hopes for what may come. First and foremost, poems like I, Too have acted as a means by which African American folks were able to reclaim their selfhood and sense of individualism, overwriting the ‘’outmoded, stereotyped caricatures'’ that were interpreted as facts throughout a traditional, white-superior America (Tarver, A. 2006). This exploration into the works of folk from a heavily marginalised and often demeaned background has since led to a wealth of knowledge, not only within the field of literature, but the other arts too. Academics have acknowledged this to be a venture into ‘’specific intellectual and ideological labour(s)’’, without which the American landscape of poetry may well have remained a white-dominated, culturally narrow-minded and uninspired scene.

In the poem, Hughes describes a ubiquitous racial oppression that degrades African Americans from their proper place. He writes from the perspective of “the darker brother” to an American family of white people who send him “to eat in the kitchen / When company comes.” This second stanza develops the tone of resistance introduced by the poem’s opening line, “I, too, sing America,” by contrasting the speaker’s present-day segregation with his claim to belonging in America. The second stanza develops this theme further, expressing the speaker’s hope that the present racial exclusion of being sent “to eat in the kitchen” will give way to a future in which, as he states: “When company comes / Nobody’ll dare / Say to me, / ‘Eat in the kitchen,’/ Then.” Ultimately, this supports Hughes's idea that he belongs in America’s family as the “darker brother.” Hughes ties together the sense of the unity that U.S. President Abraham Lincoln spoke about regarding the separate and diverse parts of the American democracy (the coexistence of slavery and freedom) by referencing Walt Whitman's poem "I Hear America Singing". Whitman celebrates the many voices of working-class Americans, but he does not explicitly include Black people or acknowledge their essential contributions to the nation he portrays in the poem. Critics often see “I, Too” as a response to this oversight. By opening with “I, too, sing America”, Hughes affirms that Black Americans have always been part of the national chorus, even when Whitman’s idealised vision excluded them and the segregated America of the 1920s denied them a full sense of belonging. Hughes’s poem is a powerful act of reclamation, responding directly to Whitman by reshaping the nation’s song to include those it has excluded. This is hopeful defiance—he speaks openly of the day “When company comes / Nobody’ll dare / Say to me / ‘Eat in the kitchen,’ / Then,” sharing his belief that change will come, even when those in power would rather he remain silent and out of sight.

Lines from this poem are engraved on the exterior walls of the National Museum of African American History and Culture in Washington, D.C.

I, too, sing America.

I am the darker brother.
They send me to eat in the kitchen
When company comes,
But I laugh,
And eat well,
And grow strong.

Tomorrow,
I'll be at the table
When company comes.
Nobody'll dare
Say to me
"Eat in the kitchen,"
Then.

Besides,
They'll see how beautiful I am
And be ashamed,—

I, too, am America.

citations: Nelson, E. S. (2015) Ethnic American Literature: An Encyclopedia for Students. Greenwood

Tarver, A., Barnes, P. C. (2006). New Voices on The Harlem Renaissance: Essays on Race, Gender, and Literary Discourse. Fairleigh Dickinson University Press. 
Watts, E. K. (2012). Hearing the Hurt: Rhetoric, Aesthetics, and Politics of The New Negroe Movement. University of Alabama Press.
