= J. P. Daughton =

James Patrick Daughton (born in 1970) is an American historian of modern Europe and European imperialism who serves as Professor of History at Stanford University, with a courtesy appointment in French and Italian. His research focuses on French colonialism, religion and politics, humanitarianism, and the social and environmental history of empire. Daughton is a tenured member of the Stanford faculty; he joined Stanford's tenure line in 2004, was promoted to associate professor in 2010, and became a full professor in 2021. His affiliations at Stanford include the Europe Center, the Center for African Studies, and the Center for Human Rights and International Justice.

Daughton has provided commentary for The Atlantic, Newsweek, Time Magazine, and CNN. He presently resides in San Francisco, California. He sits on the executive board of New Global Politics, a research institute composed of academics from various U.S. universities seeking to address pressing world issues.

== Early life and education ==
Daughton earned a B.A. from Amherst College in 1992, an M.Phil. from the University of Cambridge in 1994, and a Ph.D. in history from the University of California, Berkeley in 2002.

== Reception of work ==
=== In the Forest of No Joy (2021) ===
Trade outlets highlighted In the Forest of No Joy's archival depth and narrative. Publishers Weekly called it a meticulous account that reconstructs “one of the deadliest construction projects in history,” praising Daughton's use of colonial records to foreground African experiences. Writing in Foreign Affairs, Nicolas van de Walle deemed the book “accessible,” noting that it paints a vivid picture of colonial bureaucracy, racism, and the political rhetoric surrounding the Congo–Océan project.

General-interest outlets emphasized the human costs the book documents. Tunku Varadarajan characterized the study as “unflinching” and often harrowing in The Wall Street Journal . The New Yorker's Briefly Noted column (Aug. 23/30, 2021 issue) called the book “unsparing,” summarizing Daughton's reconstruction of forced labor under lethal conditions and his effort to “upend Eurocentric narratives" in the archival record.

Some academic reviews also praised the book's contribution and suggested areas for further research. Deborah Neill, an associate professor of Modern European History at York University, highlighted the research's scope and argued that the study supports the idea that colonial violence was widespread, not just an exception. Neill also mentioned the financing networks behind the railroad as a potential topic for more investigation. In a 2022 review for the Journal of Transport History, Gordon Pirie noted that the book significantly enhances understanding of the thirteen-year project from 1921 to 1934. Pirie lauds Daughton's use of a broad array of surviving sources, including accounts, drawings, diagrams, photographs, reports, marginal notes, memoirs, letters, and testimonies. These materials were gathered from various libraries and the archives of the Batignolles engineering company and the colonial governor’s office in Brazzaville.

== Awards and honors ==
- George Louis Beer Prize (American Historical Association) for An Empire Divided.
- Alf Andrew Heggoy Book Prize (French Colonial Historical Society) for An Empire Divided. Oxford University Press.
- Choice Outstanding Academic Titles for An Empire Divided. Oxford University Press.
- Shortlisted, Cundill History Prize (2022), for In the Forest of No Joy. Cundill Prize.
- Finalist, American Library in Paris Book Award (2022), for In the Forest of No Joy. The American Library in Paris.
- John Tracy Ellis Dissertation Prize (American Catholic Historical Association).
- Fulbright Fellowship (France, 1998–1999).

== Selected bibliography ==
- An Empire Divided: Religion, Republicanism, and the Making of French Colonialism, 1880–1914. Oxford: Oxford University Press, 2006. Oxford University Press
- (Ed., with Owen White) In God’s Empire: French Missionaries and the Modern World. Oxford: Oxford University Press, 2012. Oxford University Press
- In the Forest of No Joy: The Congo–Océan Railroad and the Tragedy of French Colonialism. New York: W. W. Norton, 2021
