= Peter Cundill =

Canadian businessman (1938–2011)

Francis Peter Cundill
- Born: October , 1938; Montreal, Quebec, Canada
- Died: January 24, 2011 (aged 72); London

Academic background
- Education: McGill University (1960)

Academic work
- Discipline: Finance; Investment
- Notable ideas: There’s Always Something To Do (2011)

Notes
- Biography: Routines and Orgies: The Life of Peter Cundill (15/11/2014)

Francis Peter Cundill (October 1938 – January 24, 2011) was a Canadian value investor. He was most noted for his flagship investment fund, Cundill Value Fund. Cundill was a follower of the Benjamin Graham investment style.

== Biography ==
Peter Cundill was born in Montreal, Quebec in October 1938, and was educated at Lower Canada College. He completed a Bachelor of Commerce degree from McGill University in 1960. He then qualified as a Chartered Accountant (1963) and a Chartered Financial Analyst Charter Holder (1968), which lead to a career in the investment management business. Cundill worked at Greenshields Inc. in Montreal and the Yorkshire Group in Vancouver In 2006 Cundill was diagnosed with Fragile X Tremor/Ataxia Syndrome, an as yet untreatable neurological condition. Cundill died on January 24, 2011, in London.

== Investment career ==
- 1974, Cundill started Peter Cundill & Associates Ltd. and Cundill Value Fund was founded.
- 1998, Mackenzie Investments acquired Cundill Funds Inc.
- 2006, Cundill sold the remaining 5% of his firm to Mackenzie.
- 2009, Cundill retired from daily operational fund management, becoming Chairman Emeritus of Mackenzie Cundill.

== Recognition ==
- In 2001, Cundill was presented the Canadian Investment Awards Analysts' Choice Career Achievement award in recognition of proven superior performance and his lifetime contribution to the financial community.
- In 2003, Cundill was presented the Fund Manager of the Year award.
- In 2004, Cundill was honoured with a fellowship by the Institute of Chartered Accountants of British Columbia (ICABC).
- In 2008, Cundill established the Cundill International Prize in History at McGill, which is "awarded annually to an author who has published a book determined to have a profound literary, social and academic impact on the subject".
- Cundill was an Advisory Board Member for the Ben Graham Centre for Value Investing at the Ivey School of Business.

== Selected publications ==
- There's Always Something to Do: The Peter Cundill Investment Approach, Christopher Risso-Gill, ISBN 978-0-7735-3863-4
- Routines and Orgies: The Life of Peter Cundill, Financial Genius, Philosopher, and Philanthropist, Christopher Risso-Gill, Publishing Date November 2014, ISBN 9780773544727
