= John Henderson (historian) =

British Renaissance historian

John S. Henderson is a professor of Italian Renaissance history at Birkbeck College, University of London.

== Selected publications ==
- Piety and Charity in Late Medieval Florence, Clarendon Press, Oxford, 1994, xviii + 545 pages; revised paperback ed.: Chicago University Press, 1997, xviii + 533 pages.
- Italian translation: Pieta' e carita' nella Firenze del Basso Medioevo, Casa Editrice Le Lettere, Florence, 1998, pp. 545.
- The Great Pox. The French Disease in Renaissance Europe, with J. Arrizabalaga and R. French (Yale University Press, 1997).
- The Renaissance Hospital. Healing the Body and Healing the Soul (New Haven and London: Yale University Press, 2006), xxxiv + 458 pages.
- German translation: Das Spital im Florenz der Renaissance – Heilung für den Leib und für die Seele (Steiner Verlag, Stuttgart, 2013)
- Italian translation: L'Ospedale Rinascimentale. La cura del corpo e la cura dell'anima (Odoya, Bologna, 2016)
- Florence Under Siege: Surviving Plague in an Early Modern City (Yale University Press, 2019).

Edited volumes

- Charity and the Poor in Late Medieval and Renaissance Europe: England and Italy Compared in Continuity and Change, 3.ii (1988), 176 pages.
- [ed. with T.V. Verdon], Christianity and the Renaissance, Syracuse University Press, 1990, xviii + 611 pages.
- [ed. with R. Wall], Poor Women and Children in the European Past, Routledge, 1994, xiii + 347 pages.
- [ed. With A. Pastore], 'Medicina dell'Anima, Medicina del Corpo: l'Ospedale in Europa tra Medio Evo ed Età Moderna: Special number of Medicina e Storia, III (2003), 134 pages.
- The Impact of Hospitals in Europe 1000–2000: People, Landscapes, Symbols, 'Introduction' and edited by John Henderson, Peregrine Horden, and Alessandro Pastore (Frankfurt am Main, Peter Lang, Autumn 2006), 426 pages.
- Teoria e pratica Medica. Rimedi e formacopee in età moderna, ‘Introduction’, ed. with M. Garbellotti, Medicina e storia, XV (2008), pp. 190.
- Plague and the City, eds, L. Englemann, J. Henderson, C. Lynteris (Routledge, London, 2018).

Forthcoming: *Representing Infirmity in Renaissance Italy, ed. Federica Jacobs and Jonathan Nelson (Routledge, London, 2020).
