= African American founding fathers of the United States =

Activists for legal equality and human liberty

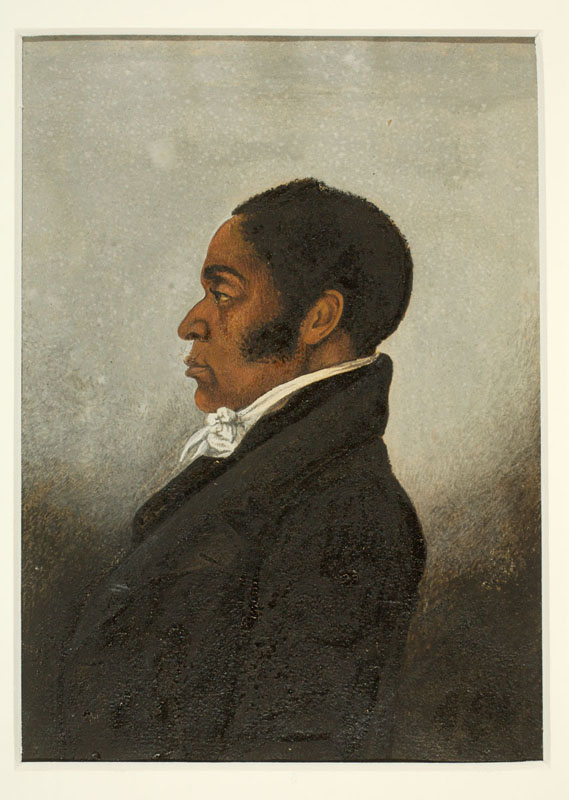
Watercolor painting of James Forten (1766–1842) of Philadelphia, a sailmaker by profession and one of the African American founding fathers of the United States

The African American founding fathers of the United States are the African Americans who worked to include the equality of all races as a fundamental principle of the United States. Beginning in the abolition movement of the 19th century, they worked for the abolition of slavery, and also for the abolition of second class status for free blacks. Their goals were temporarily realized in the late 1860s, with the passage of the 13th, 14th, and 15th amendments to the United States Constitution. However, after Reconstruction ended in 1877, the gains were partly lost and an era of Jim Crow gave blacks reduced social, economic and political status. The recovery was achieved in the Civil Rights Movement, especially in the 1950s and 1960s, under the leadership of blacks, such as Martin Luther King Jr. and James Bevel, as well as whites that included Supreme Court justices and Presidents. In the 21st century scholars have studied the African American founding fathers in depth.

== Reconstruction ==
=== Politics of Reconstruction ===
As the Civil War was ending, the major issues facing President Abraham Lincoln were the status of the ex-slaves (called "Freedmen"), the loyalty and civil rights of ex-rebels, the status of the 11 ex-Confederate states, the powers of the federal government needed to prevent a future civil war, and the question of whether Congress or the President would make the major decisions.

The severe threats of starvation and displacement of the unemployed, unhoused freedmen were met by the first major federal relief agency, the Freedmen's Bureau, operated by the Army.

Three "Reconstruction Amendments" were passed to expand civil rights for black Americans: the Thirteenth Amendment outlawed slavery; the Fourteenth Amendment guaranteed equal rights for all and citizenship for blacks; the Fifteenth Amendment prevented race from being used to disfranchise men.

Of more immediate usefulness than the constitutional amendments, were laws passed by Congress to allow the federal government, through the new Justice Department and through the federal courts to enforce the new civil rights Even if the state governments ignored the problem. These included the Enforcement Acts of 1870–71 and the Civil Rights Act of 1875.

Ex-Confederates remained in control of most Southern states for more than two years, but that changed when the Radical Republicans gained control of Congress in the 1866 elections. President Andrew Johnson, who sought easy terms for reunions with ex-rebels, was virtually powerless; he escaped by one vote removal through impeachment. Congress enfranchised black men and temporarily suspended many ex-Confederate leaders of the right to hold office. New Republican governments came to power based on a coalition of Freedmen together with Carpetbaggers (new arrivals from the North), and Scalawags (native white Southerners). They were backed by the US Army. Opponents said they were corrupt and violated the rights of whites. The Republicans were in control of Southern state governments but they were deeply factionalized. The white Republicans split between the more radical "carpetbaggers" (new arrivals from the North), and the more moderate "scalawags" (native whites who had opposed the Confederacy). Meanwhile, the black Republicans were split between the more radical ex-slaves, and the more moderate ex-free blacks. State by state the multiple Republican factions battled verbally and sometimes physically, in the face of the better organized white coalition of "conservatives" (ex-Whigs) and Democrats.

In the 1870s state by state Republicans lost power to the conservative-Democratic coalition, which gained control by violence of the entire South by 1877. In response to Radical Reconstruction, the Ku Klux Klan (KKK) emerged in 1867 as a white-supremacist organization opposed to black civil rights and Republican rule. President Ulysses Grant's vigorous enforcement of the Ku Klux Klan Act of 1870 shut down the Klan, and it disbanded. But from 1868 onward in much of the South violence suppressed black voting and threatened black leaders. Rifle clubs had thousands of members. Although the KKK was suppressed, by 1874, paramilitary groups, such as the White League and Red Shirts disrupt the Republicans. Rable described them as the "military arm of the Democratic Party."

Reconstruction ended after the disputed 1876 election between Republican candidate Rutherford B. Hayes and Democratic candidate Samuel J. Tilden. With a compromise Hayes won the White House, the federal government withdrew its troops from the South, abandoning the freedmen to white conservative Democrats, who regained power in state governments.

=== Reconstruction as Second Founding of the United States ===
According to political scientists Jeffrey K. Tulis and Nicole Mellow:

The Founding, Reconstruction (often called "the second founding"), and the New Deal are typically heralded as the most significant turning points in the country’s history, with many observers seeing each of these as political triumphs through which the United States has come to more closely realize its liberal ideals of liberty and equality.

Scholars such as Eric Foner have recently expanded the theme into full-length books. Black abolitionists played a key role by stressing that freed blacks needed equal rights after slavery was abolished. Constitutional provision for racial equality for free blacks was enacted by a Congress led by Thaddeus Stevens, Charles Sumner, and Lyman Trumbull. The "second founding" comprised the 13th, 14th and 15th amendments to the Constitution. All citizens now had federal rights that could be enforced in federal court.

In a deep reaction called the Nadir of American race relations, after 1876 freedmen lost many of these rights and had second class citizenship in the era of lynching and Jim Crow laws. Finally in the 1950s the U.S. Supreme Court started to restore those rights. Under the public leadership of Martin Luther King, president of the Southern Christian Leadership Council, and the strategies of SCLC's Director of Direct Action, James Bevel, the nonviolent Civil Rights movement made the nation aware of the crisis, and under President Lyndon Johnson major civil rights legislation was passed in 1964, 1965, and 1968.

== Organizations ==
Many black organizations promoted the goal of equality after 1865.

=== The Liberator ===
The Liberator (1831–1865) was the hard-hitting highly influential abolitionist newspaper run by William Lloyd Garrison, a white man based in Boston. Of the 4,000 weekly subscribers, about 3,000 were blacks. Garrison denounced the United States Constitution as hopelessly pro slavery, and discouraged political activism as a result. Frederick Douglass at first followed Garrison, but broke with him in 1851, and promoted political action among free blacks in the North.

=== American Anti-Slavery Society ===
The interacial American Anti-Slavery Society (AASS) was formed in 1833, and grew rapidly to at least 100,000 members by 1840.

=== NERL ===
The all-black National Equal Rights League was founded in upstate New York in 1864 and had chapters across the North.

=== Union League ===
The Union League was originally a network of elite local clubs in the North, founded in 1862 to support the Union war effort. After 1867 it included biracial local organizations across the South to promote racial equality and support the Republican Party. During Reconstruction the great majority of Southern blacks joined a local unit.

=== LDF, the NAACP Legal Defense and Educational Fund ===
A totally separate organization from the NAACP, the NAACP Legal Defense and Educational Fund (LDF) was set up by Thurgood Marshall in 1940; it became fully independent of the NAACP in 1957. While NAACP is a membership organization with chapters across the country, LDF is a law firm in New York City that focuses on civil rights lawsuits. It has handled many major cases, with Brown v. Board of Education in 1954 the most famous. In Brown the Supreme Court ruled segregated schools violated the 14th Amendment. Jack Greenberg (1924–2016) succeeded Thurgood Marshall as the Director-Counsel of the LDF from 1961 to 1984.

== Activists ==
Historians in recent years have compiled directories of black leaders in the 19th century.

=== Richard Allen ===
Bishop Richard Allen (1760–1831) was the founder of the African Methodist Episcopal Church, the largest of the nation's all-black organizations. Elected the first bishop of the AME Church in 1816, Allen focused on organizing a denomination in which free Black people could worship without racial oppression and enslaved people could find a measure of dignity. He worked to upgrade the social status of the Black community, organizing Sabbath schools to teach literacy and promoting national organizations to develop political strategies.

=== James Forten ===
James Forten (1766–1842) was an African-American abolitionist and wealthy businessman in Philadelphia. He used his wealth and social standing to work for civil rights for African Americans in both the city and nationwide. Beginning in 1817, he opposed the colonization movements, particularly that of the American Colonization Society. He affirmed African Americans' claim to a stake in the United States of America. He persuaded William Lloyd Garrison to adopt an anti-colonization position and helped fund his newspaper The Liberator (1831–1865), frequently publishing letters on public issues. He became vice-president of the biracial American Anti-Slavery Society, founded in 1833, and worked for national abolition of slavery. His large family was also devoted to these causes, and two daughters married the Purvis brothers, who used their wealth as leaders for abolition.

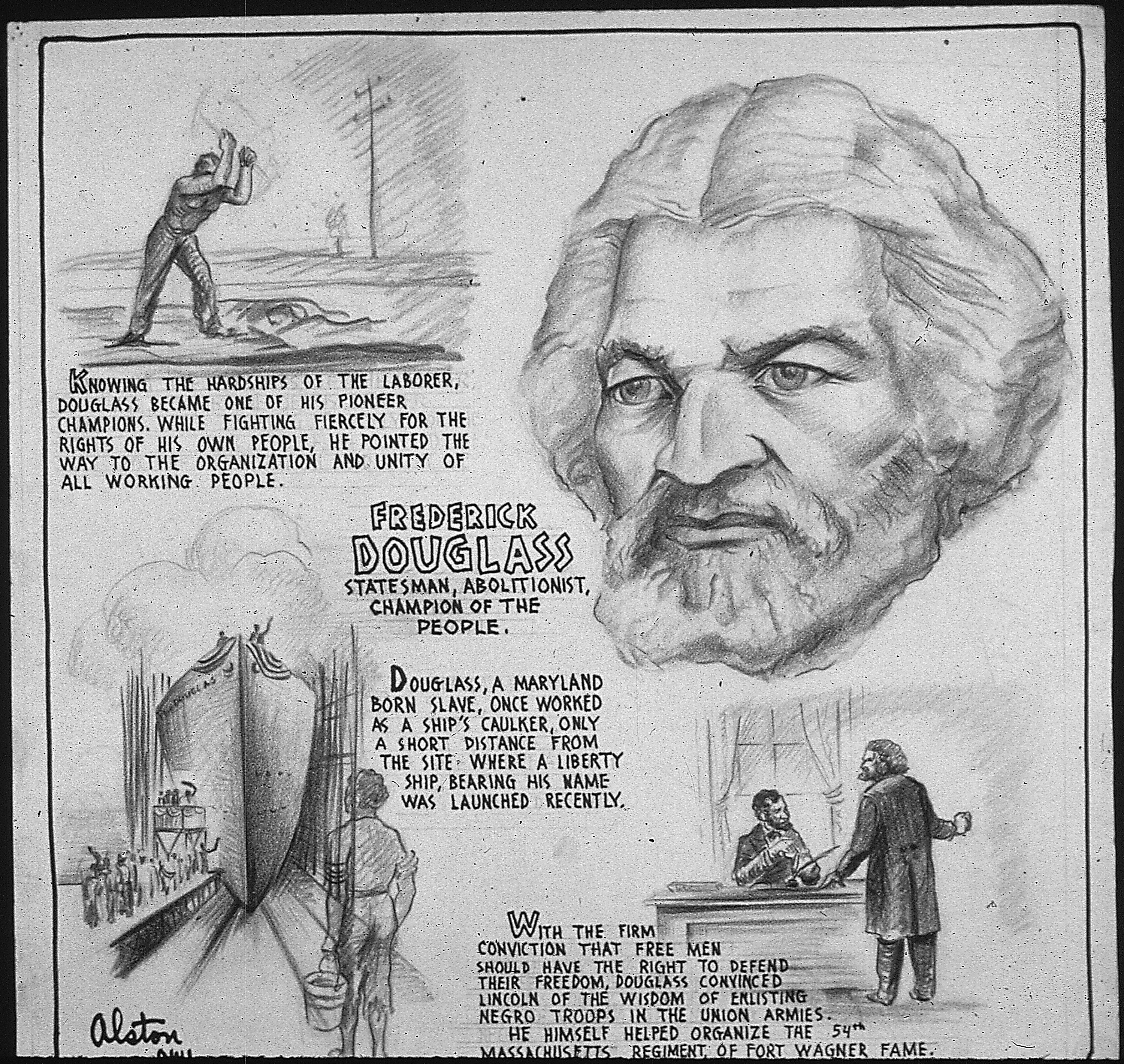
An American World War II poster from the Office of War Information, Domestic Operations Branch, News Bureau, 1943

=== Frederick Douglass ===
According to biographer David Blight, Douglass, (1817–1895), "played a pivotal role in America's Second Founding out of the apocalypse of the Civil War, and he very much wished to see himself as a founder and a defender of the Second American Republic." By 1851 Douglass broke bitterly with Garrison and now worked for abolition and equality through the U.S. Constitution and political system.

=== Henry McNeal Turner ===
In 1863 during the American Civil War, Turner (1834–1915) was appointed by the US Army as the first African-American chaplain in the United States Colored Troops. After the war, he was appointed to the Freedmen's Bureau in Georgia. He settled in Macon and was elected to the state legislature in 1868 during the Reconstruction era. An A.M.E. missionary, he also planted many AME churches in Georgia after the war. In 1880 he was elected as the first Southern bishop of the AME Church, after a fierce battle within the denomination because of its Northern roots.

Angered by the Democrats' regaining power and instituting Jim Crow laws in the late nineteenth century South, Turner began to support black nationalism and emigration of blacks to the African continent.

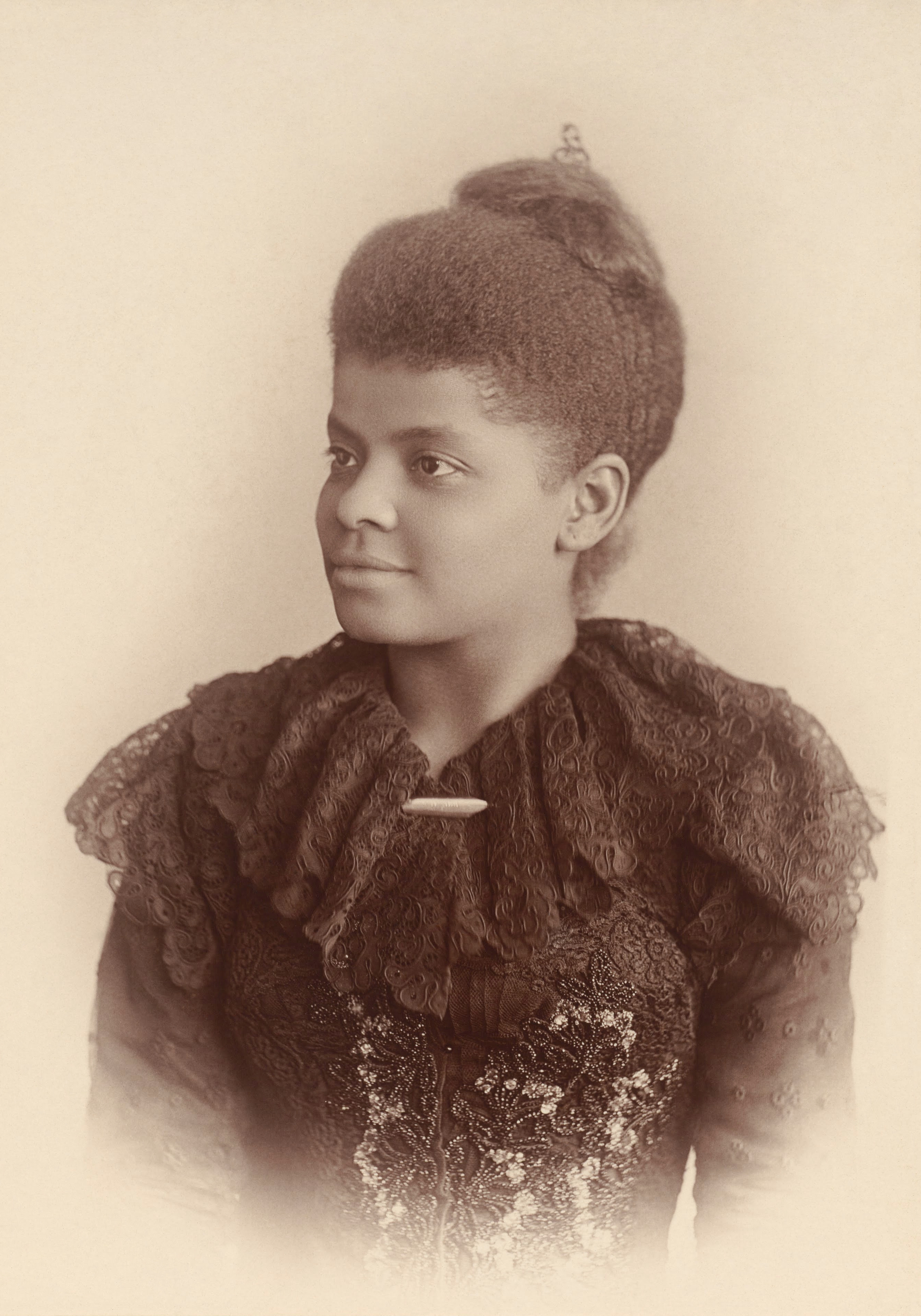
Ida B. Wells, crusader against lynching

=== Ida B. Wells ===
Ida B. Wells (1862–1931) was an investigative journalist, educator, and leader in the civil rights movement. She was one of the founders of the National Association for the Advancement of Colored People (NAACP). Wells dedicated her lifetime to combating prejudice and violence, the fight for African-American equality, especially that of women, and became the most famous Black woman in the United States of her time. In the 1890s, Wells documented lynching in the United States in articles and through her pamphlets called Southern Horrors: Lynch Law in all its Phases, and The Red Record, investigating frequent claims of whites that lynchings were reserved for Black criminals only. Wells exposed lynching as a barbaric practice of whites in the South used to intimidate and oppress African Americans who created economic and political competition—and a subsequent threat of loss of power—for whites. Well's pamphlet set out to tell the truth behind the rising violence in the South against African Americans. At this time, the white press continued to paint the African Americans involved in the incident as villains and whites as innocent victims.

=== W.E.B. Du Bois ===
W. E. B. Du Bois (1868–1963) was an academic sociologist and activist. He rose to national prominence as a leader of the Niagara Movement, a group of African-American activists who wanted equal rights for blacks. Du Bois and his supporters opposed the Atlanta Compromise, an agreement crafted by Booker T. Washington which provided that Southern blacks would work and submit to white political rule, while Southern whites guaranteed that blacks would receive basic educational and economic opportunities. Instead, Du Bois insisted on full civil rights and increased political representation, which he believed would be brought about by the African-American intellectual elite. He referred to this group as the Talented Tenth, a concept under the umbrella of racial uplift, and believed that African Americans needed the chances for advanced education to develop its leadership. He helped organize the NAACP as a counterweight to Washington's powerful grass roots organizations. Racism was the main target of Du Bois's polemics, and he strongly protested against lynching, Jim Crow laws, and discrimination in education and employment. His cause included people of color everywhere, particularly Africans and Asians in colonies. He was a proponent of Pan-Africanism and helped organize several Pan-African Congresses to fight for the independence of African colonies from European powers.

== Evaluating the original Constitution ==
Thurgood Marshall was the first African American justice of the Supreme Court. At the 200th anniversary of the Constitution in 1987, he argued:

I do not believe that the meaning of the Constitution was forever "fixed" at the Philadelphia Convention. Nor do I find the wisdom, foresight, and sense of justice exhibited by the framers particularly profound. To the contrary, the government they devised was defective from the start, requiring several amendments, a civil war, and momentous social transformations to attain the system of constitutional government, and its respect for the individual freedoms and human rights, we hold as fundamental today. When contemporary Americans cite "The Constitution," they invoke a concept that is vastly different from what the framers began to construct two centuries ago. ... While the Union survived the civil war, the Constitution did not. In its place arose a new, more promising basis for justice and equality, the 14th Amendment, ensuring protection of the life, liberty, and property of all persons against deprivations without due process, and guaranteeing equal protection of the laws.

== Additional images ==
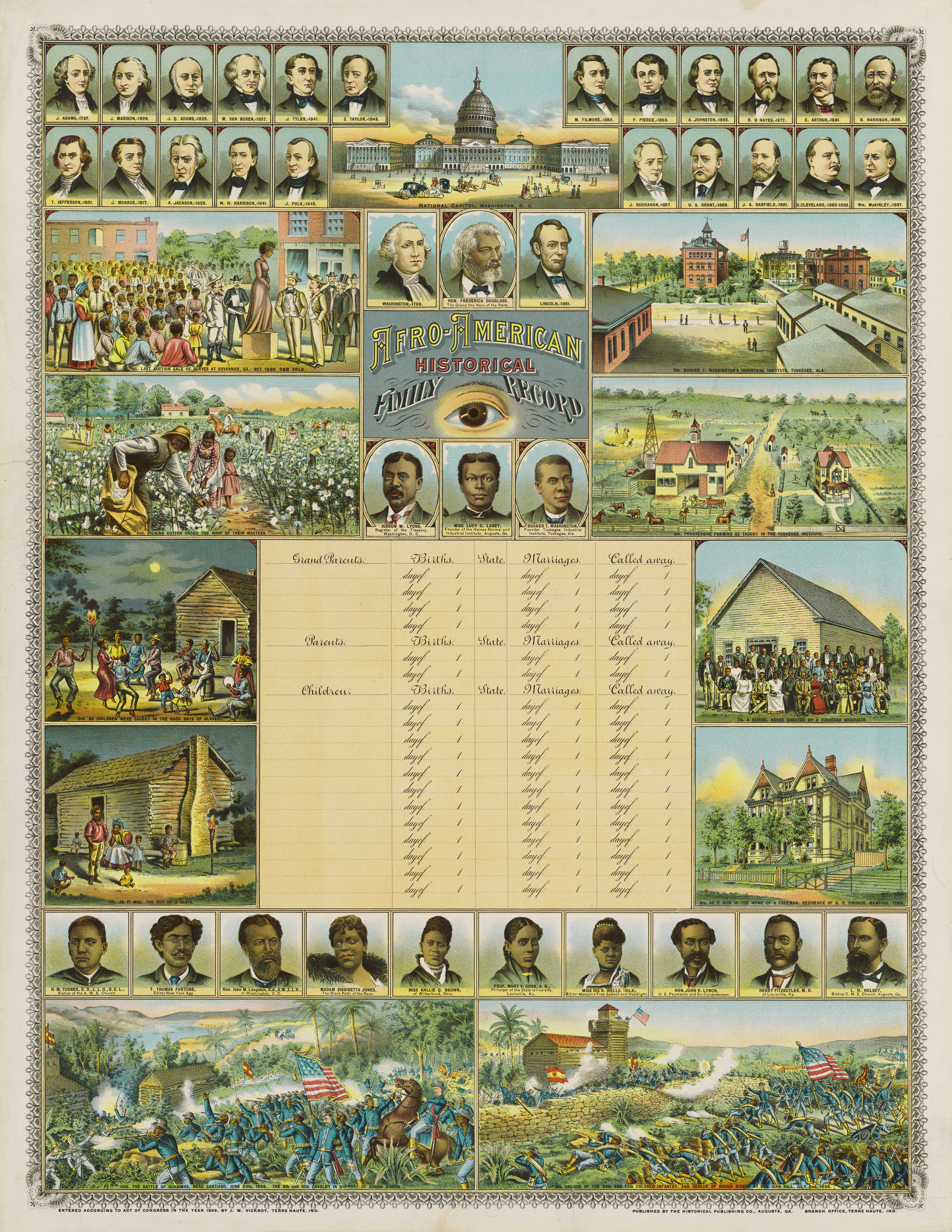
Afro-American Historical Family Record (1899)

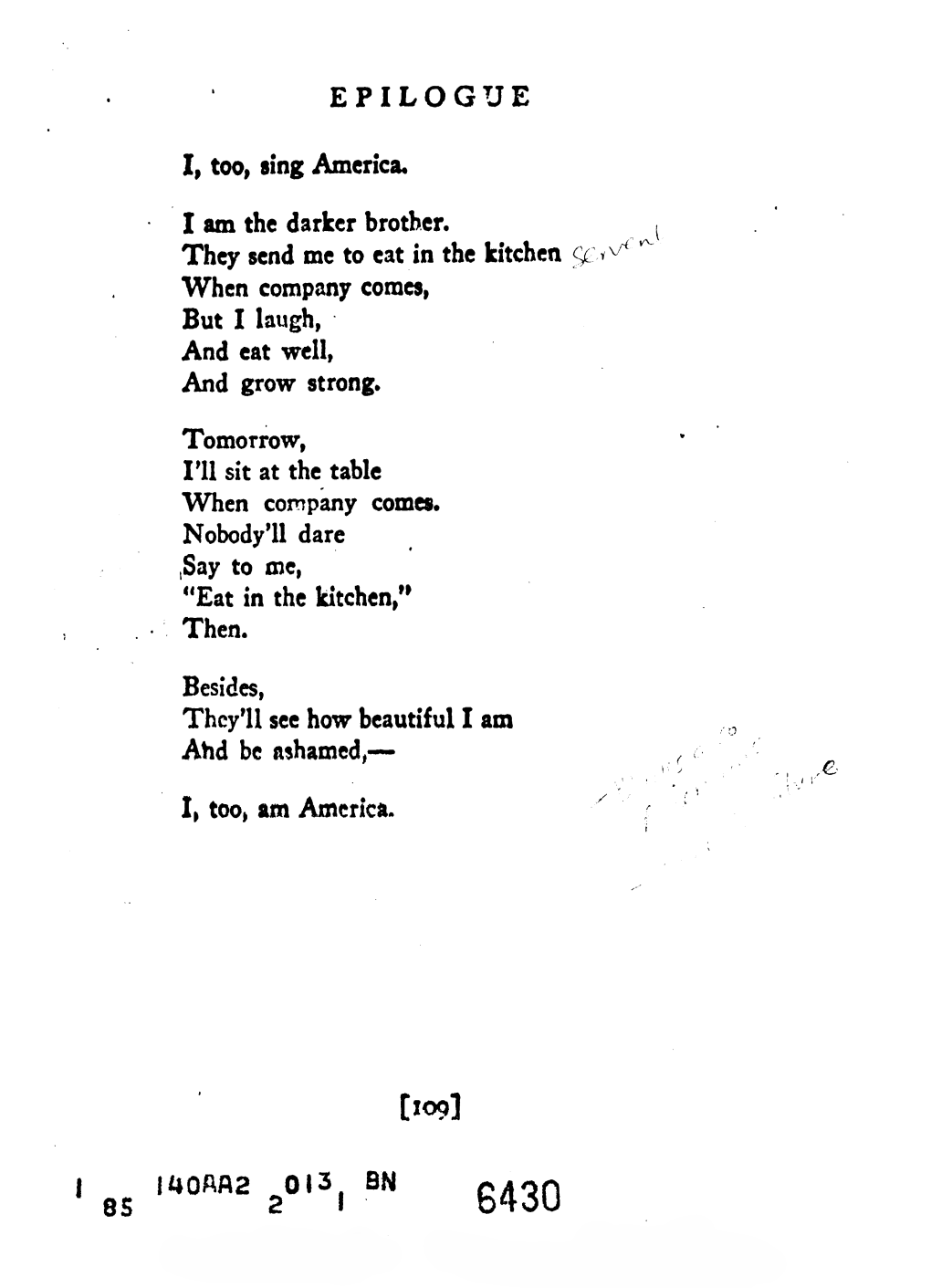
"I, Too": The last page of Langston Hughes' 1926 poetry collection Weary Blues; lines from this poem—noted for its intertextuality with Whitman's "Song of Myself"—are engraved on the wall of the National Museum of African American History and Culture

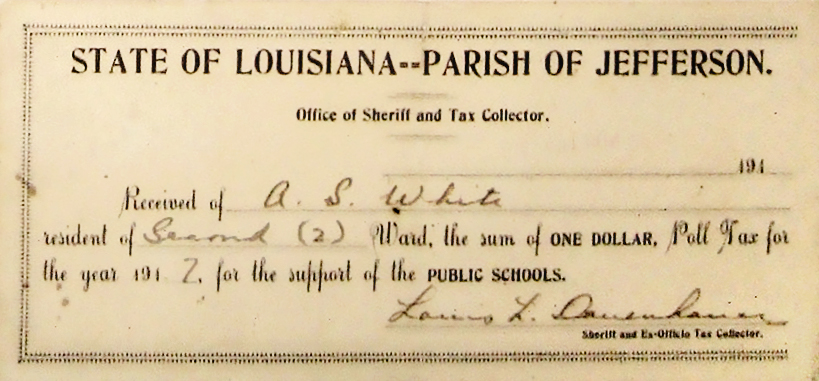
A poll tax is an optional local tax. A person had to pay it to be allowed to vote. The poll tax was designed to discourage certain people from voting, such as married women without separate bank accounts. As late as 1940, eight Southern states made payment of poll taxes a requirement for voting. This form of disenfranchisement was legal, in part because for decades after Reconstruction, the U.S. Supreme Court "closed its eyes to the use of the white primary, literacy tests, the poll tax, and other devices to deny black citizens the vote." Poll taxes were prohibited in 1964 by the Twenty-fourth Amendment to the United States Constitution

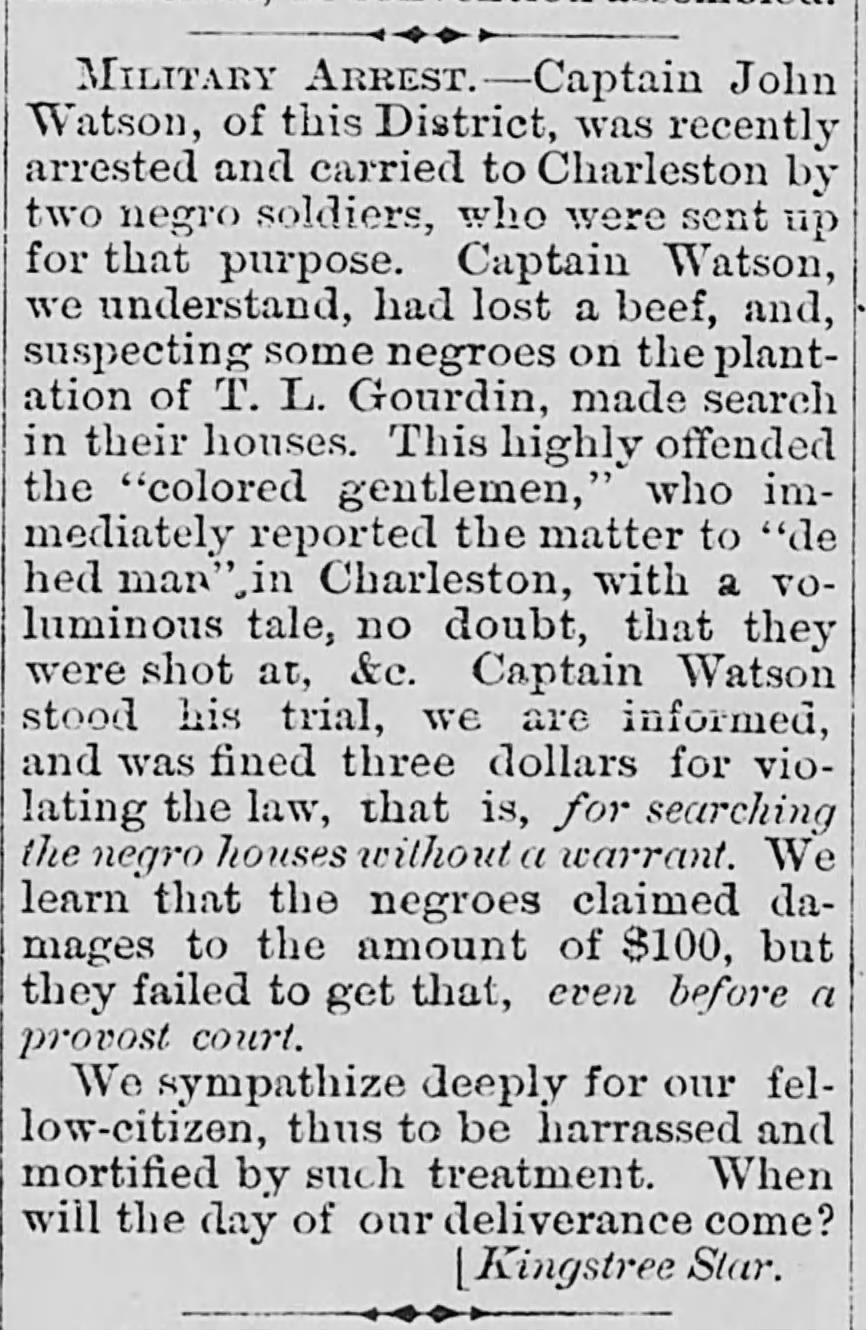
Reconstruction brought new constitutional questions to the fore, in this case, Fourth Amendment limits on search and seizure ("Military Arrest," The Daily Phoenix, South Carolina, October 7, 1866)

== See also ==
- Civil rights movement (1865–1896)
- Civil rights movement (1896–1954) and Nadir of American race relations
- Civil rights movement (1954–1968)
- Founding Fathers of the United States
- Reconstruction Amendments
- Twenty-fourth Amendment to the United States Constitution
- Barack Obama, first African American president of the United States (2009–2017)
- History of civil rights in the United States
- List of African-American abolitionists
- List of civil rights leaders
- Quakers in the abolition movement
- Timeline of the civil rights movement
- Black Lives Matter
- Post–civil rights era in African-American history
- Bibliography of slavery in the United States
