= Moshik Temkin =

Moshik Temkin is a historian. He has been based at the Harvard Kennedy School since 2009. He has also been the Johnson and Johnson Chair in Leadership and History at Schwarzman College, Tsinghua University.

== Works ==
- The Sacco–Vanzetti Affair: America on Trial (2011)
- "From Black Revolution to "Radical Humanism": Malcolm X between Biography and International History". Humanity. 2014.
- Greenberg, David; Temkin, Moshik; Williams, Mason B. (2019). Alan Brinkley: A Life in History. Columbia University Press. ISBN 978-0-231-54716-1.
- Warriors, Rebels, and Saints: The Art of Leadership from Machiavelli to Malcolm X (2023)
- Undesirables: Travel Control and Surveillance in an Age of Global Politics (upcoming)
