= David Wootton (historian) =

British historian of science (born 1952)

Anniversary Professor David Wootton FRHistS
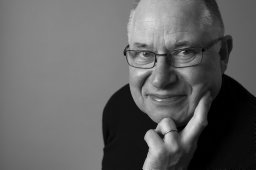
- Born: 15 January 1952 (age 74); Winchester, Hampshire, England
- Education: Balliol College, Oxford; Peterhouse, Cambridge (MA, Ph.D.)
- Scientific career
- Fields: History, Intellectual history, Cultural history, History of political thought

David Richard John Wootton (born 15 January 1952) is a British historian. He is Anniversary Professor of History at the University of York. He has given the Raleigh Lecture at the British Academy (2008); the Carlyle Lectures at the University of Oxford (2014); the Benedict Lectures at Boston University (2014); and the Besterman Lecture at Oxford University (2017).

== Books ==
- Paolo Sarpi: Between Renaissance and Enlightenment (1983) 2002 pbk edition; (See Paolo Sarpi.)
- Bad Medicine: Doctors Doing Harm Since Hippocrates (2006)
- Galileo: Watcher of the Skies (2010) (See Galileo Galilei.)
- The Invention of Science: A New History of the Scientific Revolution (2015): finalist for the Cundill History Prize, 2016.
- Power, Pleasure, and Profit: Insatiable Appetites from Machiavelli to Madison (2018)
