= Cundill Block =

- U.S. National Register of Historic Places
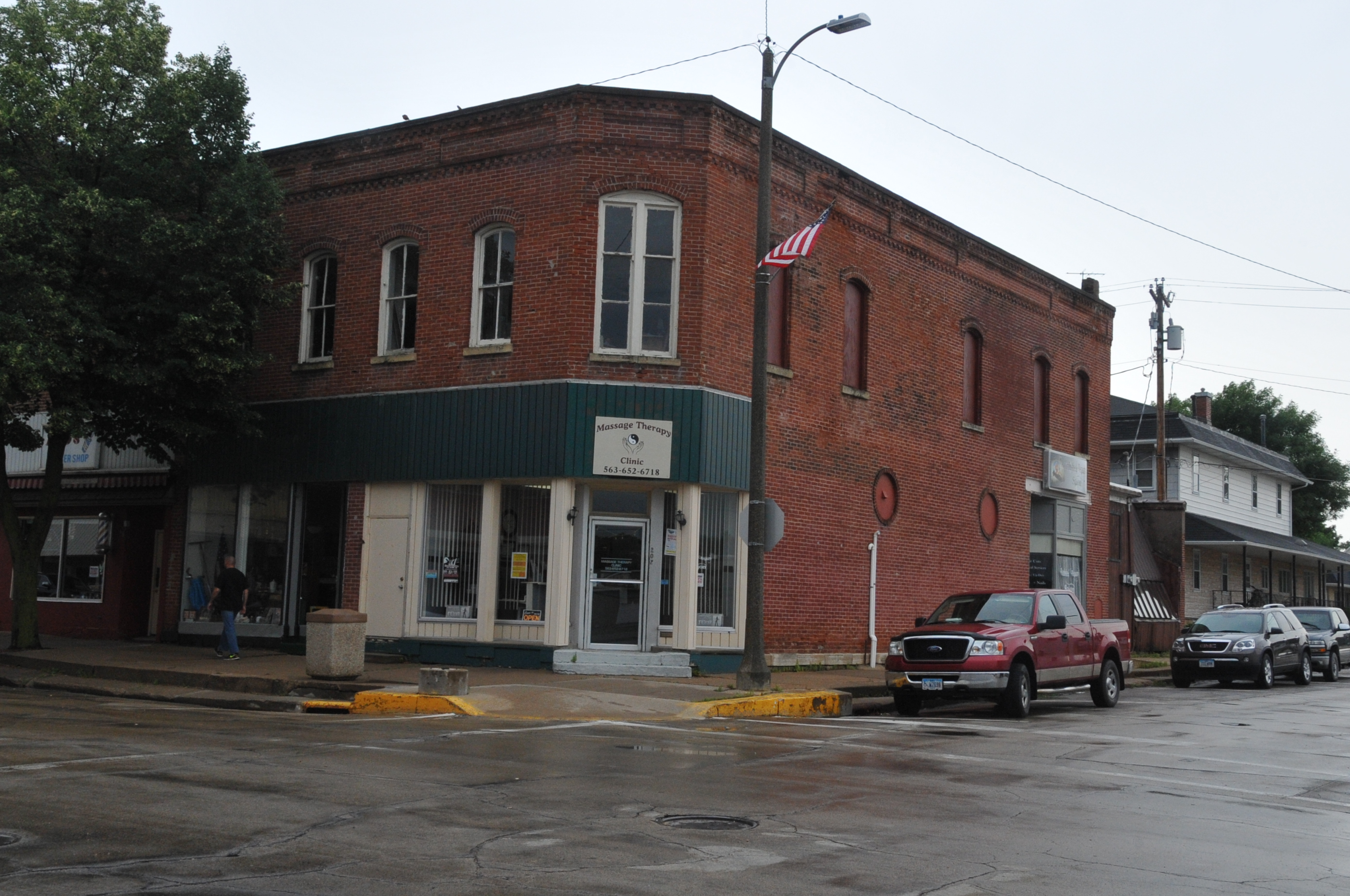

- Location within Iowa Location within the United States
- Location: 202 S. Main; Maquoketa, Iowa
- Coordinates: 42°04′03″N 90°39′57″W
- Area: less than one acre
- Built: 1882
- Architectural style: Late Victorian
- MPS: Maquoketa MPS
- NRHP reference No.: 89002112
- Added to NRHP: August 9, 1991

The Cundill Block is a historic building located in Maquoketa, Iowa, United States. Local photographer Will Cundill had this two-story brick commercial building constructed in 1882. His studio was originally located on the second floor before he moved it to the main floor in 1895 when he built an addition onto the back. A variety of retail businesses have occupied the commercial space over the years. The building is representative of the brick commercial buildings that were built in Maquoketa in the 1880s and the 1890s. It features simple brick hoodmolds over the windows and a brick patterned cornice across the top. Although covered, the iron storefront remains in place. The building was listed on the National Register of Historic Places in 1991.
