= Martha A. Sandweiss =

American historian (born 1954)

Martha Ann Sandweiss
- Born: March 29, 1954 (age 72); St. Louis, Missouri, U.S.
- Education: Radcliffe College (BA); Yale University (PhD)
- Occupation: Historian
- Employer: Princeton University
- Website: marthaasandweiss.com

Martha Ann Sandweiss (born March 29, 1954) is an American historian, with particular interests in the history of the American West, visual culture, and public history. She is a professor of History at Princeton University, and the author of several books. Sandweiss is the Founder and Project Director of the Princeton & Slavery Project, a large-scale investigation into Princeton University's historical ties to the institution of slavery.

== Princeton & Slavery Project ==
The Princeton & Slavery Project began with an undergraduate research seminar Sandweiss taught in spring 2013, and has since grown to comprise a website and public programming events in Princeton, New Jersey. The Project website launched on November 6, 2017, and currently includes more than 90 scholarly essays, a digital archive of hundreds of historical sources, video interviews with Princeton University alumni, and other multimedia tools and features. A scholarly symposium presenting Project findings was held in November 2017, beginning with a keynote speech by Nobel Laureate Toni Morrison and including panels discussing the Project's research and its implications for the study of slavery in the United States. As part of the symposium, the McCarter Theatre in Princeton commissioned and premiered seven original short plays based on collaboration with Project researchers.

== Awards and recognition ==
Her 2025 book, The Girl in the Middle, was shortlisted for the 2025 Cundill History Prize.
