= The Sacco–Vanzetti Affair: America on Trial =

2009 book by Moshik Temkin

- First edition
- Author: Moshik Temkin
- Subject: American history
- Publisher: Yale University Press
- Publication date: 2009
- Pages: 341
- ISBN: 978-0-300-15617-1

The Sacco–Vanzetti Affair: America on Trial is a 2009 book on Sacco and Vanzetti written by Moshik Temkin and published by Yale University Press.

== Bibliography ==
- Carriere, Michael H. (2010). "Writing the Introduction to the Twenty-First Century? The Practice of History and the 'War on Terror'". Reviews in American History. 38 (4): 722–727. doi:10.1353/rah.2010.a407690. ISSN 0048-7511. JSTOR 40985438. S2CID 142670994.
- Ottanelli, Fraser (2010). "Review of The Sacco-Vanzetti Affair: America on Trial". The Journal of American History. 96 (4): 1208–1209. doi:10.1093/jahist/96.4.1208. ISSN 0021-8723. JSTOR 40661910.
- Topp, Michael M. (2010). "Review of The Sacco-Vanzetti Affair: America on Trial". The American Historical Review. 115 (5): 1486–1487. doi:10.1086/ahr.115.5.1486. ISSN 0002-8762. JSTOR 23308127.
- Trasciatti, Mary Anne (2011). "Review of The Sacco-Vanzetti Affair: America on Trial". The New England Quarterly. 84 (2): 352–355. doi:10.1162/TNEQ_r_00094. ISSN 0028-4866. JSTOR 23054808. S2CID 147036221.
- Whitfield, Stephen J. (2011). "Review of The Sacco-Vanzetti Affair: America on Trial". The Journal of Interdisciplinary History. 41 (3): 477–478. doi:10.1162/JINH_r_00136. ISSN 0022-1953. JSTOR 40985770. S2CID 142751641.
