= Ruby Lal =

Ruby Lal is an author and professor of history in the Department of Middle East and South Asian Studies at Emory University.

She has written extensively about the lives of key women in early Islamic societies, especially during the Mughal Empire in South Asia.

Lal has been exposed to the history of the subcontinent at a young age. In an interview with the Christian Science Monitor, she said her mother would tell her stories about Nur Jahan, chief consort of Mughal emperor Jahangir.

== Career and Education ==
Lal read for her D.Phil in Modern History at St Edmund Hall, the University of Oxford, graduating in 2000.

Lal is well known for her research and publication of a book about Nur Jahan in 2018. The biography was reviewed by the New York Times, The Guardian, and Los Angeles Review of Books.

Lal won the Georgia Author of the Year Award for her work about Nur Jahan.

She later wrote a book about Gulbadan Begum, the Mughal princess who traveled to Mecca and Medina. Her work about Gulbadan was covered by outlets like the Wall Street Journal.

In 2020–2021, Ruby Lal was a Fellow at the Swedish Collegium for Advanced Study in Uppsala, Sweden.

== Published works ==
- Vagabond Princess: The Great Adventures of Gulbadan (2024)
- Empress: The Astonishing Reign of Nur Jahan (2018)
- Coming of Age in Nineteenth-Century India (2013)
- Domesticity and Power in the Early Mughal World (2005)
