= Draughton =

Draughton may refer to:

- Draughton, Northamptonshire, England
- Draughton, North Yorkshire, England
- Draughton, County Tyrone, a townland in County Tyrone, Northern Ireland
