= Patrick Joyce (historian) =

British social historian

Patrick Joyce (born 1945) is a British/Irish social historian, whose work also encompasses political history. Joyce is known for his theoretical work on the nature of history, especially on the relationship between history and the social sciences.

Consistently challenging academic orthodoxies, Joyce has been a radical voice in successive debates about the direction of social and cultural history since the 1970s. His research has ranged widely from the politics of class in Victorian England to the formation of the modern self, it has always shown a preoccupation with liberalism, governance, and the nature of freedom.

While Joyce’s work has concentrated on Britain, its influence has registered worldwide, in North America and beyond.

== Biography ==
=== Personal life ===
He was born in Paddington, London in 1945, the child of Irish rural immigrants from Mayo and Wexford. He was educated in a West London secondary modern school, and worked after leaving school early, before studying history and English literature at the University of Keele. He did his graduate work in history at Balliol College Oxford. He is married to Rosaleen Malone Joyce, author of Outdoor Learning Past and Present (2012), and he has two children.

=== Academic career ===
Joyce’s purely academic work has gone through several phases. His first book: Work, Society and Politics (1981), was an example of what was called at the time “The new social history,” inspired in part by the British Marxist historians, with whom it disagreed, and the French Annales school. It is a study of the politics and culture of the factory districts of northern, industrial England.

Next, Joyce helped to pioneer “the linguistic turn” in historical writing, in which attention was paid less to social structures than to the meanings attached to historical actions. His book Visions of the People (1991), represented this phase.

Joyce then moved more deeply into the orbit of Michel Foucault’s influence in The Rule of Freedom (2003), in particular emphasizing how liberal freedom was a means of governing people and things. An interest in material things and their operations on the workings of power is represented in several works, most notably The State of Freedom published in 2014.

=== Recent work ===
Since 2014 Joyce has turned from purely academic work to a new kind of writing which combines memoir and history. This draws deeply on his Irish immigrant background, and his experience of growing up in postwar working class London. It is also shaped by his experience of life in the post-industrial north of England. This work is reflected in his articles in the Field Day Review, and in his memoir Going to My Father’s House (2021).

This new historical type of writing is in effect a form of meditation on the societies that are forming and melting around us in the present. It lays bare the emotional force by which the past remains within and between us, and works with the sensibility of Walter Benjamin and W. G. Sebald as part of its iteration of the past.

His book Remembering Peasants, which draws on the experience of Ireland, Poland and Italy (amongst other locations) shows Joyce working in the similar vein of his recent books. In the latter, he pursues as his theme the end of the peasant order in Europe.

=== Honours ===
In 2026, Joyce was made a member of the Royal Irish Academy.

== Selected publications ==
=== Books ===
- Remembering Peasants: A Personal History of a Vanished World (Scribner, 2024)
- Going to My Father’s House: A History of My Times (Verso, 2021)
- The State of Freedom: A Social History of the British State since 1800 (Cambridge University Press, 2014)
- Joint ed., with T Bennett, Material Powers: Cultural Studies, History and the Material Turn (Routledge, 2010).
- Special issue: joint editor, with T Bennett and F Dodsworth, “Liberalisms, Government, Culture”, Cultural Studies, 21:4-5, Sept 2007, 525-778.
- The Rule of Freedom: Liberalism and the Modern City (Verso, 2003), translated into Greek and Chinese editions.
- (Ed.), The Social in Question : New Bearings in History and the Social Sciences, (Routledge, 2002).
- (Ed.), The Oxford Reader on Class, (Oxford University Press, 1995).
- Democratic Subjects: the Self and the Social in Nineteenth-century England (Cambridge University Press, 1994).
- Visions of the People: Industrial England and the Question of Class 1848-1914 (CUP, 1991).
- (Ed.), The Historical Meanings of Work, (Cambridge University Press, 1987).
- Work, Society and Politics: The Culture of the Factory in Later Victorian England (Harvester Press, Brighton, 1980).

=== Articles, chapters ===
- "Joyce and Chandra Mukerji: the state of things: state history and theory reconfigured, Theory and Society, 46(5), May 2017, https://www.researchgate.net/publication/316706382_The_state_of_things_state_history_and_theory_reconfigured
- “Time Thickens, Takes on Flesh: The Other West, Field Day Review, 11:2015. https://fieldday.ie/wp-content/uploads/2015/11/patrick-joyce-sample.pdf
- “The Journey West”, Field Day Review, 10:2014.https://hummedia.manchester.ac.uk/institutes/cresc/research/JourneyWestFINAL.pdf
- " What is the social in social history? ", Past and Present, Feb. 2010.
- "History: Great Britain: 1815 to their Present", Encyclopædia Britannica, current edition.
- "The gift of the past: towards a critical history" in K. Jenkins, et al. (eds), Manifestos for History (Routledge, 2007).
- “A Post-modern Historian: Interview with Patrick Joyce”, Historiography Quarterly, 2:2003 (University of Shanghai Press, in Chinese).
- “More secondary modern than postmodern”, Rethinking History, 5:3, Dec. 2001.
- “The return of history : postmodernism and the politics of academic history in Britain”, Past and Present, no. 158, Feb. 1998 pp. 207-235.
- "The end of social history?", Social History, 20:1, Jan. 1995, pp. 73-91.
- "History and post-modernism", Past and Present, 133, Nov. 1991.
- "Work", chapter in Cambridge Social History of Great Britain, 1750–1950, Vol. II (3 vols.), ed. F.M.L. Thompson (Cambridge University Press, 1990).

A number of these articles have been extensively anthologised in various readers on the nature of contemporary history, and post-modernism and history.
