= Peter Fritzsche =

Peter Fritzsche is a historian and professor at the University of Illinois Urbana-Champaign.

== Works ==
- Fritzsche, Peter (1992). A Nation of Fliers: German Aviation and the Popular Imagination. Harvard University Press. ISBN 978-0-674-60121-5.
- Fritzsche, Peter (1998). Germans Into Nazis. Harvard University Press. ISBN 978-0-674-35092-2.
- Fritzsche, Peter (2004). Stranded in the Present: Modern Time and the Melancholy of History. Harvard University Press. ISBN 978-0-674-01339-1.
- Fritzsche, Peter (2008). Life and Death in the Third Reich. Harvard University Press. ISBN 978-0-674-02793-0.
- Fritzsche, Peter (2016). An Iron Wind: Europe Under Hitler. Basic Books. ISBN 978-0-465-09655-8.
- Fritzsche, Peter (2021). Hitler's First Hundred Days: When Germans Embraced the Third Reich. Oxford University Press. ISBN 978-0-19-887112-5.
