= Nicolas van de Walle =

American political scientist (1957–2024)

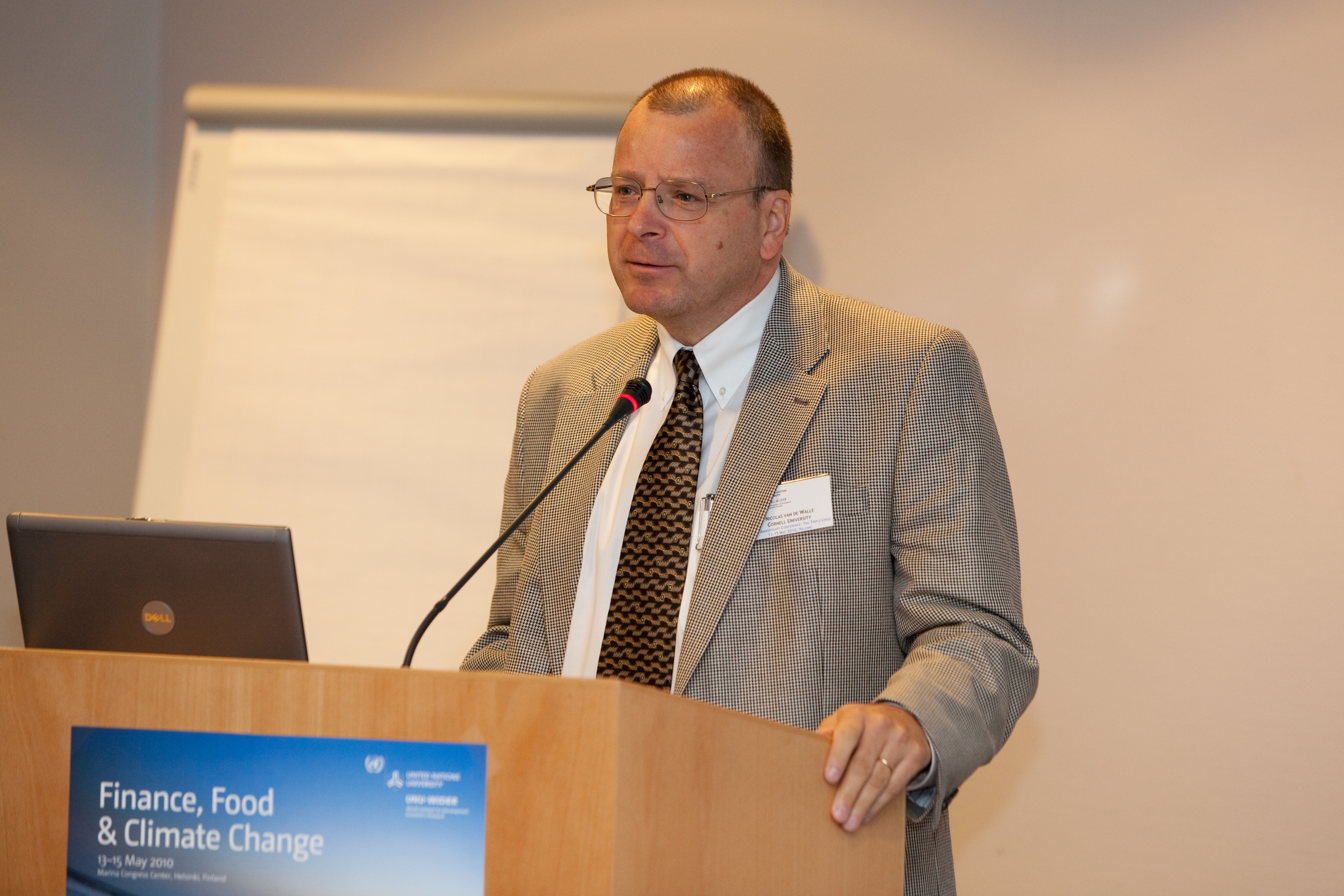
- Born: June 25, 1957; Brussels, Belgium
- Died: July 15, 2024 (aged 67)
- Occupation: Maxwell M. Upson Professor of Government
- Employer: Cornell University

Nicolas van de Walle (June 25, 1957 – July 15, 2024) was an American political scientist specializing in comparative politics. He taught at Cornell University since 2004, and was recently the Maxwell M. Upson Professor of Government. Between January 2004 and June 2008 he directed the Mario Einaudi Center for International Studies. Before coming to Cornell, he taught at Michigan State University, and has worked at The World Bank and The United Nations Development Program. Since 2005, Van de Walle served as the Associate Dean for International Studies. Van de Walle had written the "Africa" book review section for Foreign Affairs since the May/June 2004 issue.

Born in Brussels, Belgium on June 25, 1957, he died on July 15, 2024, at the age of 67.

== Awards ==
In 2002, Van de Walle was awarded the G.M. Luebbert Prize of the American Political Science Association for the best book in comparative politics for his book African Economies and the Politics of Permanent Crisis, 1979-1999 (Cambridge University Press, 2001).

== Education ==
- Ph.D., Princeton University, The Woodrow Wilson School of International and Public Affairs 1990
- M.S. in Economics (International Relations), London School of Economics and Political Science 1980
- B.A. in International Relations, University of Pennsylvania 1979
