= Frederick Douglass Book Prize =

Annual award for nonfiction books in English on enslavement

- Description: Outstanding non-fiction on slavery, resistance, and abolition
- Country: United States
- Presented by: Gilder Lehrman Institute of American History & Yale University (GLC)
- Reward: $25,000
- Website: macmillan.yale.edu/glc/frederick-douglass-book-prize

The Frederick Douglass Book Prize is awarded annually by the Gilder Lehrman Institute of American History and the Gilder Lehrman Center for the Study of Slavery, Resistance, and Abolition at Yale University.

It is a $25,000 award for the most outstanding non-fiction book (or pair of books) of the year in English on the subject of slavery, abolition, or antislavery movements. It was first awarded in 1999.

== List of recipients ==
List of recipients
Year	Author	Title
2025	Justene Hill Edwards	Savings and Trust: The Rise and Betrayal of the Freedman’s Bank
2024 (joint)	Marlene L. Daut	Awakening the Ashes: An Intellectual History of the Haitian Revolution
2024 (joint)	Sara E. Johnson	Encyclopédie noire: The Making of Moreau de Saint-Méry’s Intellectual World
2023 (joint)	R. Isabela Morales	Happy Dreams of Liberty: An American Family in Slavery and Freedom
2023 (joint)	Simon P. Newman	Freedom Seekers: Escaping from Slavery in Restoration London
2022 (joint)	Tiya Miles	All That She Carried: The Journey of Ashley’s Sack, a Black Family Keepsake
2022 (joint)	Jennifer L. Morgan	Reckoning with Slavery: Gender, Kinship, and Capitalism in the Early Black Atlantic
2021 (joint)	Vincent Brown	Tacky’s Revolt: The Story of an Atlantic Slave War
2021 (joint)	Marjoleine Kars	Blood on the River: A Chronicle of Mutiny and Freedom on the Wild Coast
2020	Sophie White	Voices of the Enslaved: Love, Labor, and Longing in French Louisiana
2019	Amy Murrell Taylor	Embattled Freedom: Journeys through the Civil War’s Slave Refugee Camps
2018 (joint)	Erica Armstrong Dunbar	Never Caught: The Washingtons' Relentless Pursuit of Their Runaway Slave, Ona Judge
2018 (joint)	Tiya Miles	The Dawn of Detroit: A Chronicle of Slavery and Freedom in the City of the Straits
2017	Manisha Sinha	The Slave's Cause: A History of Abolition
2016	Jeff Forret	Slave against Slave: Plantation Violence in the Old South
2015	Ada Ferrer	Freedom’s Mirror: Cuba and Haiti in the Age of Revolution
2014	Christopher Hager	Word By Word: Emancipation and the Act of Writing
2013	Sydney Nathans	To Free a Family: The Journey of Mary Walker
2012	James H. Sweet	Domingos Álvares, African Healing, and the Intellectual History of the Atlantic World
2011	Stephanie McCurry	Confederate Reckoning: Power and Politics in the Civil War South
2010	Judith A. Carney and Richard Nicholas Rosomoff	In the Shadow of Slavery: Africa's Botanical Legacy in the Atlantic World
2010; Second Prize	Siddharth Kara	Sex Trafficking: Inside the Business of Modern Slavery
2009	Annette Gordon-Reed	The Hemingses of Monticello: An American Family
2008	Stephanie E. Smallwood	Saltwater Slavery: A Middle Passage from Africa to American Diaspora
2007	Christopher Leslie Brown	Moral Capital: Foundations of British Abolitionism
2006	Rebecca J. Scott	Degrees of Freedom: Louisiana and Cuba after Slavery
2005	Laurent Dubois	A Colony of Citizens: Revolution and Slave Emancipation in the French Caribbean
2004	Jean Fagan Yellin	Harriet Jacobs: A Life
2003	Seymour Drescher	The Mighty Experiment: Free Labor versus Slavery in British Emancipation
2003; Second Prize	James F. Brooks	Captives and Cousins: Slavery, Kinship, and Community in the Southwest Borderlands
2002	Robert W. Harms	The Diligent: A Voyage through the Worlds of the Slave Trade
2002; Second Prize	John Stauffer	The Black Hearts of Men: Radical Abolitionists and the Transformation of Race
2001	David Blight	Race and Reunion: The Civil War in American Memory
2000	David Eltis	The Rise of African Slavery in the Americas
1999	Ira Berlin	Many Thousands Gone: The First Two Centuries of Slavery
1999; Second Prize	Philip D. Morgan	Slave Counterpoint: Black Culture in the Eighteenth-Century Chesapeake and Lowcountry

== See also ==
- List of history awards
