= David W. Blight =

American historian (born 1949)

- David W. Blight in 2026
- Born: David William Blight; March 21, 1949 (age 77); Flint, Michigan, U.S.
- Spouse: Karin Beckett (m. 1987; div. 2004)
- Awards: Frederick Douglass Prize (2001); Bancroft Prize (2002, 2019); Lincoln Prize (2002, 2019); Pulitzer Prize (2019)

Academic background
- Education: Michigan State University (BA, MA); University of Wisconsin, Madison (PhD)
- Thesis: Keeping Faith in Jubilee (1985)

Academic work
- Discipline: American studies; History
- Sub-discipline: American history
- Institutions: North Central College; Harvard University; Amherst College; Yale University
- Notable works: Race and Reunion (2001); Frederick Douglass (2018)
- Website: davidwblight.com

David William Blight (born 1949) is the Sterling Professor of History, of African American Studies, and of American Studies and director of the Gilder Lehrman Center for the Study of Slavery, Resistance, and Abolition at Yale University. Previously, Blight was a professor of history at Amherst College, where he taught for 13 years. He has won several awards, including the Bancroft Prize and Frederick Douglass Prize for Race and Reunion: The Civil War in American Memory, and the Pulitzer Prize and Lincoln Prize for Frederick Douglass: Prophet of Freedom. In 2021, he was elected to the American Philosophical Society.

== Early life and education ==
Blight was born on March 21, 1949, in Flint, Michigan, where he grew up in a mobile home park. He attended Flint Central High School, from which he graduated in 1967.

He then attended Michigan State University where he played for the Michigan State Spartans baseball team and graduated in 1971 with a Bachelor of Arts in history. Blight taught at Flint Northern High School for seven years. He received his Master of Arts degree in American history from Michigan State in 1976 and a Doctor of Philosophy degree in the same field from the University of Wisconsin–Madison in 1985 with a dissertation titled Keeping Faith in Jubilee: Frederick Douglass and the Meaning of the Civil War. He married Karin Beckett in 1987 and they divorced in 2004.

== Career ==
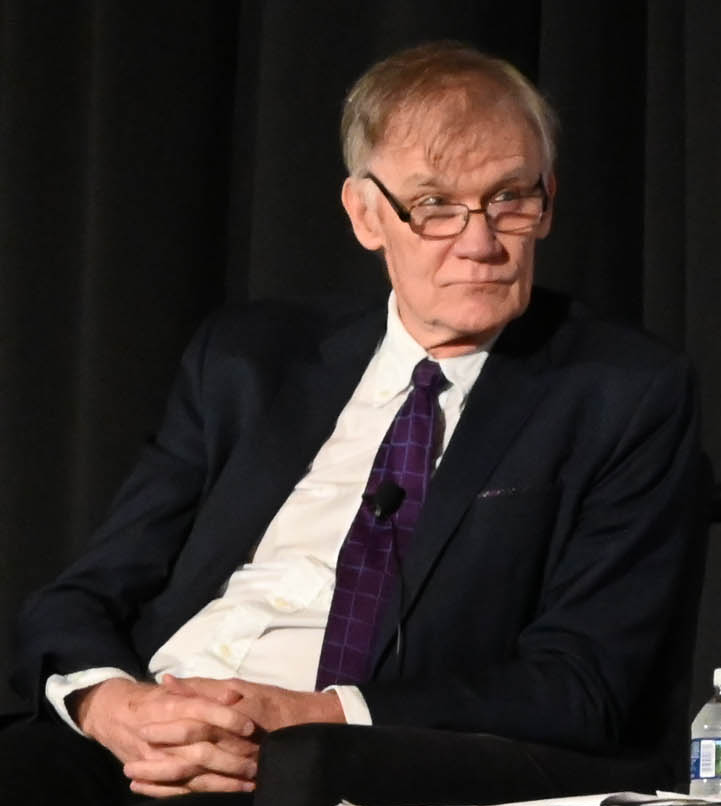
David W. Blight at the 2019 National Book Festival

Following stints at North Central College (1982–1987) and Harvard University (1987–1989), Blight taught at Amherst College from 1990 to 2003. In 2001, he published Race and Reunion: The Civil War in American Memory. It "presented a new way of understanding the nation's collective response to the war, arguing that, in the interest of reunification, the country ignored the racist underpinnings of the war, leaving a legacy of racial conflict." The book earned Blight both the Bancroft Prize and Frederick Douglass Prize.

After being hired by Yale in 2003 and teaching as a full professor, in 2006 Blight was selected to direct the Gilder Lehrman Center for the Study of Slavery, Resistance and Abolition. His primary focus is on the American Civil War and how American society grappled with the war in its aftermath. His 2007 book A Slave No More: Two Men Who Escaped to Freedom, Including Their Own Narratives of Emancipation provides context for newly discovered first-person accounts by two African-American slaves who escaped during the Civil War and emancipated themselves.

He also lectures for One Day University. In Spring 2008, Blight recorded a 27-lecture course, The Civil War and Reconstruction Era, 1845–1877 for Open Yale Courses, which is available online.

Blight wrote Frederick Douglass: Prophet of Freedom, released in 2018, as the first major biography of Douglass in nearly three decades. One reviewer called it "the definitive biography of Frederick Douglass" and another heralded the book as "the new Frederick Douglass standard-bearer for years to come." It earned the 2019 Pulitzer Prize for History and the 2019 Gilder Lehrman Lincoln Prize.

Contributing to the anthology Our American Story (2019), Blight addressed the possibility of a shared American narrative. He cited Frederick Douglass's 1867 speech titled "Composite Nation" calling for a "multi-ethnic, multi-racial 'nation' ... incorporated into this new vision of a 'composite' nationality, separating church and state, giving allegiance to a single new constitution, federalizing the Bill of Rights, and spreading liberty more broadly than any civilization had ever attempted". Blight concluded that although the search for a new unified American story would be difficult, "we must try".

In July 2020, Blight was one of the 153 signers of the "Harper's Letter", published in Harper's Magazine and titled "A Letter on Justice and Open Debate", which expressed concern that "The free exchange of information and ideas, the lifeblood of a liberal society, is daily becoming more constricted."

In 2020, David Blight was commissioned by the then president of Yale College Peter Salovey to form a research group on "the history of Yale and slavery." In 2024, Blight published Yale and Slavery: A History, in which he found that "A multitude of Yale University's founders, rectors and early presidents, faculty, donors, and graduates played roles in sustaining slavery, its ideological underpinnings, and its power".

From 2024 to 2025, Blight served as the president of the Organization of American Historians (OAH), the largest professional society for teaching and researching American history in the United States.

== Awards ==
- 2001 Frederick Douglass Prize for Race and Reunion: The Civil War in American Memory.
- 2002 Bancroft Prize; co-winner, James A. Rawley Prize from the Organization of American Historians; 2002 Ellis W. Hawley Prize, Organization of American Historians; Merle Curti Award; and Lincoln Prize for Race and Reunion
- 2008 Connecticut Book Prize for A Slave No More: Two Men Who Escaped to Freedom, Including Their Own Narratives of Emancipation
- 2012 Anisfield-Wolf Prize for American Oracle: The Civil War in the Civil Rights Era
- 2018 Vincent J. Dooley Distinguished Teaching Fellow, honor bestowed by the Georgia Historical Society.
- 2018 The Lincoln Forum's Richard Nelson Current Award of Achievement
- 2019 Gilder Lehrman Lincoln Prize for Frederick Douglass: Prophet of Freedom
- 2019 New England Book Awards for Frederick Douglass: Prophet of Freedom
- 2019 Pulitzer Prize for History for Frederick Douglass: Prophet of Freedom
- 2019 PEN Oakland Josephine Miles Literary Award for Frederick Douglass: Prophet of Freedom
- 2020 American Academy of Arts and Letters Gold Medal in History
- 2022 American Academy of Achievement's Golden Plate Award

== Works ==
=== Books as author ===
- David W. Blight (1989). Frederick Douglass' Civil War: Keeping Faith in Jubilee. LSU Press. ISBN 978-0-8071-1724-8.
- David W. Blight (2001). Race and Reunion: The Civil War in American Memory. Harvard University Press. ISBN 978-0-674-00819-9.
- David W. Blight (2002). Beyond the Battlefield: Race, Memory, and the American Civil War. University of Massachusetts Press. ISBN 978-1-55849-361-2.
- David W. Blight (2007). A Slave No More: Two Men Who Escaped to Freedom, Including Their Own Narratives of Emancipation. Houghton Mifflin Harcourt. ISBN 978-0-15-101232-9.
- David W. Blight (2011). American Oracle: The Civil War in the Civil Rights Era. Belknap Press. ISBN 978-0-67-404855-3.
- David W. Blight (2018). Frederick Douglass: Prophet of Freedom. Simon & Schuster. ISBN 978-1-4165-9031-6.
- David W. Blight (2024). Yale and Slavery: A History. Yale University Press. ISBN 9780300273847.

=== Books as contributor ===
- Blight, David W. "No Desperate Hero: Manhood and Freedom in a Union Soldier's Experience". Clinton, Catherine and Nina Silber, eds. Divided Houses: Gender and the Civil War. Oxford University Press, 1992.
- Frederick Douglass (1993). Narrative of the Life of Frederick Douglass, an American Slave. Introduction David W. Blight. Bedford Books of St. Martin's Press.
- "They Knew What Time It Was: African-Americans and the Coming of the Civil War". Gabor Boritt, ed. (1996). Why the Civil War Came. Oxford University Press. ISBN 0-19-507941-8.
- Blight, David W. "Quarrel Forgotten or a Revolution Remembered? Reunion and Race in the Memory of the Civil War, 1875-1913", in Blight and Simpson, eds. 1997, pp. 151–180.
- Blight, David W. and Simpson, Brooks D., eds. Union and Emancipation: Essays on Politics and Race in the Civil War Era. Kent State University Press, 1997.
- Bingham, Caleb. The Columbia Orator. 200th anniversary edition. David Blight is the editor and author of introduction. New York University Press, 1997.
- Du Bois, W. E. B.. The Souls of Black Folk. Edited with an Introduction by David Blight and Robert Gooding-Williams. Bedford/St. Martin's, 1997.
- Blight, David W., ed. and author of two articles in the volume. Passages to Freedom: The Underground Railroad in History and Memory. Smithsonian Press Books, 2004.
- "The Theft of Lincoln in Scholarship, Politics, and Public Memory". Eric Foner, ed. (2008). Our Lincoln: New Perspectives on Lincoln and His World. W. W. Norton & Company. ISBN 978-0-393-06756-9.
- Blight, David W., ed. When This Cruel War Is Over: The Civil War Letters of Charles Harvey Brewster. University of Massachusetts Dartmouth, 2009.
- Robert Harms, Bernard K. Freamon, and David W. Blight, eds. Indian Ocean Slavery in the Age of Abolition. Yale University Press, 2013.
- Warren, Robert Penn. Who Speaks for the Negro? Reprint edition, Yale University Press. Introduction by David W. Blight, 2014.
- Douglass, Frederick. My Bondage and My Freedom. Reprint edition, Yale University Press. Introduction and notes by David W. Blight, 2014.
- "Cup of Wrath and Fire". Ted Widmer, ed. (2016). The New York Times DISUNION: A History of the Civil War. New York: Oxford University Press, pp. 10–13.
- "Hating and Loving the 'Real' Abe Lincolns: Lincoln and the American South" (2011). Richard Carwardine and Jay Sexton, eds., The Global Lincoln. New York: Oxford University Press.
- "Introduction" (co-authored with Gregory P. Downs and Jim Downs). David W. Blight and Jim Downs, eds. (2017). Beyond Freedom: Disrupting the History of Emancipation. University of Georgia Press. 2017. ISBN 9780820351483.
- "Composite Nation?", Joshua Claybourn, ed. (2019). Our American Story: The Search for a Shared National Narrative. Potomac Books. ISBN 978-1640121706.
- "Foreword: From Every Point of the Compass out of the Countless Graves". Brian Matthew Jordan; Jonathan W. White, eds. (2023). Final Resting Places: Reflections on the Meaning of Civil War Graves. The University of Georgia Press. ISBN 9780820364551.
- The Frederick Douglass Collection: A Library of America Boxed Set (2023), including Autobiographies, edited by Henry Louis Gates and Speeches & Writings, edited by David W. Blight, two volumes, 2,097 pages.

Academic offices
Preceded by Jeffrey C. Alexander	Pitt Professor of American History and Institutions; 2012–2013	Succeeded by Barry Eichengreen
Non-profit organization positions
Preceded by Patricia Nelson Limerick	President of the Society of American Historians; 2013–2014	Succeeded by David Nasaw
Awards
Preceded by David Eltis	Frederick Douglass Prize; 2001	Succeeded by Robert W. Harms
Preceded by David Eltis	Frederick Douglass Prize; 2001	Succeeded by John Stauffer
Preceded by Michael A. Bellesiles	Bancroft Prize; 2002; With: Alice Kessler-Harris	Succeeded by James F. Brooks
Preceded by Susan Lee Johnson	Bancroft Prize; 2002; With: Alice Kessler-Harris	Succeeded by Alan Gallay
Preceded by David Nasaw	Bancroft Prize; 2002; With: Alice Kessler-Harris	Succeeded by Alan Gallay
Preceded by Sherry L. Smith	James A. Rawley Prize of the Organization of American Historians; 2002; With: J. William Harris	Succeeded by Sharla M. Fett
Preceded by Sherry L. Smith	James A. Rawley Prize of the Organization of American Historians; 2002; With: J. William Harris	Succeeded by Shane White
Preceded by Russell Weigley	Lincoln Prize; 2002	Succeeded by George C. Rable
Preceded by David Eltis and David Richardson	Anisfield-Wolf Book Award for Nonfiction; 2012; With: David Livingstone Smith	Succeeded by Andrew Solomon
Preceded by Isabel Wilkerson	Anisfield-Wolf Book Award for Nonfiction; 2012; With: David Livingstone Smith	Succeeded by Andrew Solomon
Preceded by Edward L. Ayers	Lincoln Prize; 2019	Succeeded by Elizabeth R. Varon
Preceded by Jack E. Davis	Pulitzer Prize for History; 2019	Succeeded by W. Caleb McDaniel
