= All That She Carried =

2021 non-fiction book by Tiya Miles

- Author: Tiya Miles
- Language: English
- Publisher: Random House
- Publication date: 2021
- Publication place: United States
- Pages: 385
- ISBN: 9781984854995

All That She Carried: The Journey of Ashley's Sack, A Black Family Keepsake is a 2021 non-fiction book by historian Tiya Miles that discusses American slavery in the 19th century, specifically focusing on Ashley's sack to guide the narrative.

The book won awards including the 2021 National Book Award for Nonfiction, the 2022 Frederick Douglass Book Prize, and the 2022 Cundill History Prize.

== Narrative ==
Ashley's sack is a cloth sack that Rose, a slave in South Carolina, gave to her 9-year-old daughter Ashley when they were permanently separated upon being sold to different owners. The sack contained a tattered dress, a lock of Rose's hair, three handfuls of pecans, and symbolically, Rose's love. The sack was then passed down through generations of the family to Ashley's granddaughter Ruth. In 1921, Ruth embroidered the cloth with its provenance and the circumstances of Rose and Ashley's separation. Rose had moved from South Carolina to Philadelphia in 1921, as part of the Great Migration.

The sack was passed on to Ruth's daughter, who died in the 1980s. It was then lost for several years, until being rediscovered at a flea market in Nashville, Tennessee in 2007. The sack was displayed at Middleton Place (a former slave plantation in South Carolina, now a museum) and the National Museum of African American History and Culture in Washington DC, until 2021.

Miles investigated the history of Rose and Ashley and used research by anthropologist Mark Auslander to likely identify them as living on the estate of South Carolina slave owner Robert Martin. Martin's slaves were sold off after he died in 1852. Miles was unable to find any primary sources regarding the lives of Rose or Ashley, because of the lack of primary accounts of slavery from enslaved people. However, using the contents of the sack, accounts from other slaves in the area (such as Harriet Jacobs), and historical scholarship, she was able to paint a portrait of the mother and daughter.

Miles also delves into the historical and cultural significance of each item in the sack. For example, the tattered dress illustrates how enslaved women were prohibited from wearing certain fabrics, as enslavers feared that more extravagant clothing would entice white men. And the handful of pecans implied that Rose may have been a chef as pecans were a delicacy in the 19th century American South not readily available to slaves.

== Reception ==
Writing for The New York Times, Jennifer Szalai stated that the book delicately balances historical facts from the era with speculation about the lives of Rose and Ashley based on the contents of the sack, given the paucity of first-hand slave accounts from the era. Writing for The Guardian, Colin Grant stated that the work found a way to tell the story of the voiceless, using an ordinary object—a cotton sack—as a template "to thread an extraordinary tale through the generations."

== Awards ==
- National Book Award for Nonfiction, 2021
- Frederick Douglass Book Prize, 2022
- Cundill History Prize, 2022
- Ralph Waldo Emerson Award, 2022
