= Lorelle D. Semley =

American historian

- Born: 1969 (age 56–57)
- Occupation: Africanist

Academic background
- Education: Georgetown University (BS); Yale University (MA); Northwestern University (MA, PhD)
- Thesis: Kétu Identities: Islam, Gender, and French Colonialism in West Africa, 1850s-1960s (2002)
- Doctoral advisor: John Hunwick
- Other advisors: Gwendolyn Mikell; Robert W. Harms; Angelique Haugerud; Diana Wylie

Lorelle Denise Semley (born 1969) is an American historian of Africa specialized in modern West Africa, French imperialism, gender, and the Atlantic World. She is a professor of history at the College of the Holy Cross.

== Career ==
Semley completed a B.S. in French at the Georgetown University School of Languages and Linguistics in 1991. Her undergraduate advisors included Gwendolyn Mikell and David Johnson. She earned a M.A. in African Studies at Yale University in 1995. Semley's interest in history and African studies was furthered graduate courses she took by Robert Harms, Angelique Haugerud, Christopher Miller, and Diana Wylie. Semley completed a M.A. (1996) and Ph.D. (2002) in History at Northwestern University. Her dissertation was titled Kétu Identities: Islam, Gender, and French Colonialism in West Africa, 1850s-1960s. Semley's doctoral advisor was John Hunwick.

Semley was an assistant professor in the history department at Wesleyan University from 2003 to 2011. She was chair of the African studies cluster from 2008 to 2010. She joined the faculty at the College of the Holy Cross in 2011 where she was a professor in the history department. Semley taught courses in Africana studies, peace and conflict studies, and gender, sexuality, and women's studies. Semley joined the faculty at Boston College in 2023 as the new director of the institution's African and African Diaspora Studies program. She specializes in modern West Africa, French imperialism, gender, and the Atlantic World.

In 2020, Semley became the editor-in-chief of History in Africa, a scholarly journal of the African Studies Association.

== Selected works ==
- Semley, Lorelle D. (2011). Mother Is Gold, Father Is Glass: Gender and Colonialism in a Yoruba Town. Indiana University Press. ISBN 978-0-253-00488-8. OCLC 695996375.
- Semley, Lorelle (2017). To be Free and French: Citizenship in France's Atlantic Empire. Cambridge University Press. ISBN 978-1-107-10114-2.
