= J. Russell Major Prize =

Annual prize given to historian

The J. Russell Major Prize is an annual prize given to a historian by the American Historical Association for the best book in English about French history.

== Background ==
The prize was established in memory of J. Russell Major, a distinguished historian who died on December 12, 1998, at the age of 77. He served as a professor of history at Emory University.

== Eligibility ==
Only the books with a copyright of 2016 are eligible for the 2017 award.

== Notable winners ==
Past winners of the prize include:

- 2026 - Miranda Spieler, Slaves in Paris: Hidden Lives and Fugitive Histories
- 2025 - Catherine Dunlop, The Mistral: A Windswept History of Modern France
- 2024 - Sara E. Johnson, Encyclopédie Noire: The Making of Moreau de Saint-Méry’s Intellectual World
- 2023 - Sara E. Black, Drugging France: Mind-Altering Medicine in the Long Nineteenth Century
- 2022 - Sarah C. Dunstan, Race, Rights and Reform: Black Activism in the French Empire and the United States from World War I to the Cold War
- 2021 - Nimisha Barton, Reproductive Citizens: Gender, Immigration, and the State in Modern France
- 2020 - Joshua Cole, Lethal Provocation: The Constantine Murders and the Politics of French Algeria
- 2019 - Venus Bivar, Organic Resistance: The Struggle over Industrial Farming in Postwar France
- 2018 - Peter Sahlins, 1668: The Year of the Animal in France
- 2017 - Rafe Blaufarb, The Great Demarcation: The French Revolution and the Invention of Modern Property
- 2016 - Ethan Katz, The Burdens of Brotherhood: Jews and Muslims from North Africa to France
- 2015 - Michael Kwass, Contraband: Louis Mandrin and the Making of a Global Underground
- 2014 - Arlette Jouanna, The St Bartholomew’s Day Massacre: The Mysteries of a Crime of State
- 2014 - Joseph Bergin, translator, The St Bartholomew’s Day Massacre: The Mysteries of a Crime of State
- 2013 - Miranda Spieler, Empire and Underworld: Captivity in French Guiana
- 2012 - Malick Ghachem, The Old Regime and the Haitian Revolution
- 2011 - Jeremy Popkin, You Are All Free: The Haitian Revolution and the Abolition of Slavery
- 2010 - Stuart Carroll, Martyrs and Murderers: The Guise Family and the Making of Europe
- 2009 - Rachel Fuchs, Contested Paternity: Constructing Families in Modern France
- 2008 - Amalia Kessler, A Revolution in Commerce: The Parisian Merchant Court and the Rise of Commercial Society in Eighteenth-Century France
- 2007 - Martha Hanna, Your Death Would Be Mine: Paul and Marie Pireaud in the Great War
- 2006 - Todd Shepard, The Invention of Decolonization: The Algerian War and the Remaking of France
- 2005 - Barbara Diefendorf, From Penitence to Charity: Pious Women and the Catholic Reformation in Paris
- 2004 - Steven Englund, Napoleon: A Political Life
- 2003 - Jessica Riskin, Science in the Age of Sensibility: The Sentimental Empiricists of the French Enlightenment
- 2002 - Robert W. Harms, The Diligent: A Voyage Through the Worlds of the Slave Trade
- 2001 - Debora Silverman, Van Gough and Gauguin: The Search for Sacred Art
- 2000 - Daniel Sherman, The Construction of Memory in Interwar France
