= Amy Taylor =

Amy Taylor may refer to:

- Amy Duggan (born 1979), née Taylor, Australian association football player and media personality
- Amy Taylor (golfer) (born 2000), English golfer
- Amy Murrell Taylor, American historian
- Amy Taylor (musician) (born 1996), vocalist with the band Amyl and the Sniffers
- Amethyst (drag queen), the stage name of Amy Taylor, an American drag performer
