= Ralph Waldo Emerson Award =

Non-fiction literary award

The Ralph Waldo Emerson Award is a non-fiction literary award given by the Phi Beta Kappa society, the oldest academic society of the United States, for books that have made the most significant contributions to the humanities. Albert William Levi won the first of these awards, in 1960.

== Winners ==
- 1960: Albert William Levi, Philosophy and the Modern World (Indiana University Press)
- 1961: W. T. Stace, Mysticism and Philosophy (J.B. Lippincott)
- 1962: Herbert J. Muller, Freedom in the Ancient World (Harper & Brothers)
- 1963: Richard Hofstadter, Anti-intellectualism in American Life (Knopf)
- 1964: Thomas F. Gossett, Race: The History of An Idea in America (Southern Methodist University Press)
- 1965: Howard Mumford Jones, O Strange New World: American Culture - The Formative Years (Viking Press)
- 1966: John Herman Randall, Jr., The Career of Philosophy: From the German Enlightenment to the Age of Darwin (Columbia University Press)
- 1967: Robert Coles, Children of Crisis: A Study of Courage and Fear (Atlantic-Little, Brown)
- 1968: Winthrop D. Jordan, White Over Black: American Attitudes Toward the Negro, 1550-1812 (University of North Carolina Press)
- 1969: Peter Gay, Weimar Culture: The Outsider as Insider (Harper & Row)
- 1970: Rollo May, Love and Will (Norton)
- 1971: Charles A. Barker, American Convictions: Cycles of Public Thought, 1600-1850 (J.B. Lippincott)
- 1972: John Rawls, A Theory of Justice (The Belknap Press of Harvard University Press)
- 1973: Barrington Moore, Jr., Reflections on the Causes of Human Misery and upon Certain Proposals to Eliminate Them (Beacon Press)
- 1974: Frederic C. Lane, Venice: A Maritime Republic (Johns Hopkins University Press)
- 1975: Marshall Hodgson, The Venture of Islam (University of Chicago Press)
- 1976: Paul Fussell, The Great War and Modern Memory (Oxford University Press)
- 1977: Eugen Weber, Peasants into Frenchmen: The Modernization of Rural France, 1870-1914 (Stanford University Press)
- 1978: Bruce Kuklick, The Rise of American Philosophy: Cambridge, Massachusetts, 1860-1930 (Yale University Press)
- 1979: Elizabeth L. Eisenstein, The Printing Press As an Agent of Change, Volumes I and II (Cambridge University Press)
- 1980: Frank E. Manuel and Fritzie P. Manuel, Utopian Thought in the Western World (The Belknap Press of Harvard University Press)
- 1981: George M. Fredrickson, White Supremacy: A Comparative Study in American and South African History (Oxford University Press)
- 1982: Robert Nozick, Philosophical Explanations (The Belknap Press of Harvard University Press)
- 1983: Daniel Joseph Singal, The War Within: From Victorian to Modernist Thought in the South, 1919-1945 (University of North Carolina Press)
- 1984: David G. Roskies, Against the Apocalypse: Responses to Catastrophe in Modern Jewish Culture (Harvard University Press)
- 1985: Joel Williamson, The Crucible of Race: Black-White Relations in the American South since Emancipation (Oxford University Press)
- 1986: Benjamin I. Schwartz, The World of Thought in Ancient China (The Belknap Press of Harvard University Press)
- 1987: Alfred W. Crosby, Ecological Imperialism: The Biological Expansion of Europe, 900-1900 (Cambridge University Press)
- 1988: David Montgomery, The Fall of the House of Labor (Cambridge University Press)
- 1989: Peter Brown, The Body and Society: Men, Women, and Sexual Renunciation in Early Christianity (Columbia University Press)
- 1990: William L. Vance, America’s Rome, Volumes I and II (Yale University Press)
- 1991: Carl N. Degler, In Search of Human Nature: The Decline and Revival of Darwinism in American Social Thought (Oxford University Press)
- 1992: Gordon S. Wood, The Radicalism of the American Revolution (Knopf)
- 1993: Theda Skocpol, Protecting Soldiers and Mothers: The Political Origins of Social Policy in the United States (The Belknap Press of Harvard University Press)
- 1994: David Levering Lewis, W. E. B. Du Bois: Biography of a Race, 1868-1919 (Henry Holt and Company)
- 1995: Caroline Walker Bynum, The Resurrection of the Body in Western Christianity, 220-1336 (Columbia University Press)
- 1996: Eloise Quiñones Keber, Codex Telleriano-Remensis: Ritual, Divination, and History in a Pictorial Aztec Manuscript (University of Texas Press)
- 1997: Steven B. Smith, Spinoza, Liberalism, and the Question of Jewish Identity (Yale University Press)
- 1998: Jill Lepore, The Name of War: King Philip's War and the Origins of American Identity (Alfred A. Knopf)
- 1999: H.C. Erik Midelfort, A History of Madness in Sixteenth-Century Germany (Stanford University Press)
- 2000: Peter Novick, The Holocaust in American Life (Houghton Mifflin)
- 2001: Debora Silverman, Van Gogh and Gauguin: The Search for Sacred Art (Straus and Giroux)
- 2002: Fredric L. Cheyette, Ermengard of Narbonne and the World of the Troubadours (Cornell University Press)
- 2003: David Freedberg, The Eye of the Lynx: Galileo, His Friends, and the Beginnings of Modern Natural History (University of Chicago Press)
- 2004: Jennifer Michael Hecht, The End of the Soul (Columbia University Press)
- 2005: Isabel V. Hull, Absolute Destruction: Military Culture and the Practices of War in Imperial Germany (Cornell University Press)
- 2006: Susan Scott Parrish, American Curiosity: Cultures of Natural History in the Colonial British Atlantic World (University of North Carolina Press and the Omohundro Institute for Early American History and Culture)
- 2007: David Brion Davis, Inhuman Bondage: The Rise and Fall of Slavery in the New World (Oxford University Press)
- 2008: Leor Halevi, Muhammad's Grave: Death Rites and the Making of Islamic Society (Columbia University Press)
- 2009: Peter Trachtenberg, The Book of Calamities: Five Questions About Suffering and Its Meaning (Little, Brown and Company)
- 2010: Susan M. Reverby, Examining Tuskegee: The Infamous Syphilis Study and Its Legacy (University of North Carolina Press)
- 2011: Timothy Snyder, Bloodlands: Europe Between Hitler and Stalin (Basic Books)
- 2012: Jay Rubenstein, Armies of Heaven: The First Crusade and the Quest for Apocalypse (Basic Books)
- 2013: Timothy Egan, Short Nights of the Shadow Catcher: The Epic Life and Immortal Photographs of Edward Curtis (Houghton Mifflin Harcourt)
- 2014: David Nirenberg, Anti-Judaism: The Western Tradition (W.W. Norton)
- 2015: Joan Breton Connelly, The Parthenon Enigma: A New Understanding of the West’s Most Iconic Building and the People Who Made It (Knopf)
- 2016: E.M. Rose, The Murder of William of Norwich: The Origins of the Blood Libel in Medieval Europe (Oxford University Press)
- 2017: Elizabeth Hinton, From the War on Poverty to the War on Crime: The Making of Mass Incarceration in America (Harvard University Press)
- 2018: Mike Wallace, Greater Gotham: A History of New York City from 1898 to 1919 (Oxford University Press)
- 2019: Sarah E. Igo, The Known Citizen: A History of Privacy in Modern America (Harvard University Press)
- 2020: Sarah Seo, Policing the Open Road: How Cars Transformed American Freedom (Harvard University Press)
- 2021: Alice Baumgartner, South to Freedom: Runaway Slaves to Mexico and the Road to the Civil War (Basic Books)
- 2022: Tiya Miles, All That She Carried: The Journey of Ashley's Sack, a Black Family Keepsake (Random House)
- 2023: Deborah Cohen, Last Call at the Hotel Imperial: The Reporters Who Took On a World at War (Random House)
- 2024: Jeremy Eichler, Time's Echo: The Second World War, the Holocaust, and the Music of Remembrance (Knopf)
- 2025: Stefanos Geroulanos, The Invention of Prehistory: Empire, Violence, and Our Obsession with Human Origins (Liveright)
- 2026: Greg Grandin, America, América: A New History of the New World (Penguin Press)

== See also ==
- Phi Beta Kappa Award in Science
- List of general awards in the humanities
