= Tiya Miles =

American historian

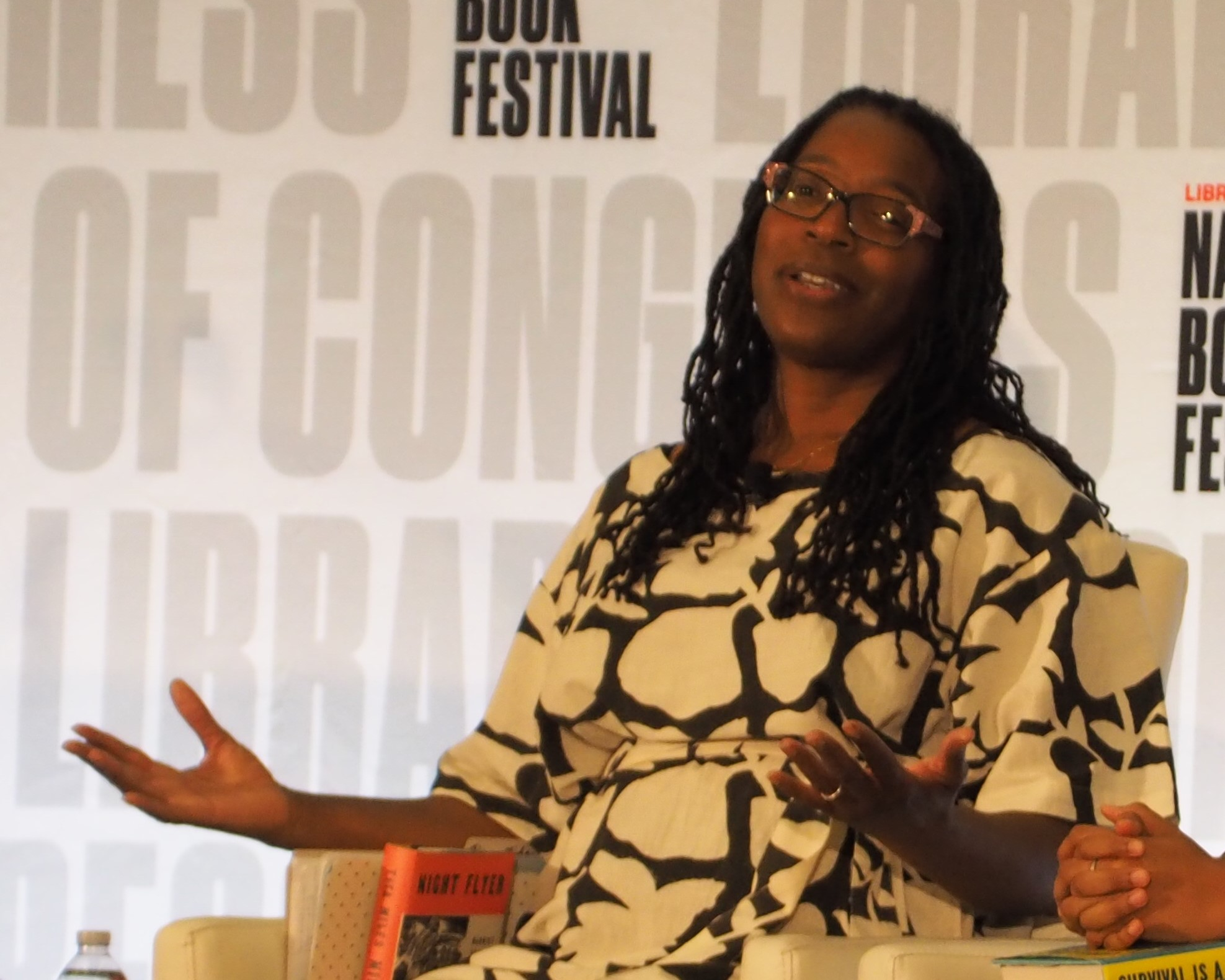
- Born: Tiya Alicia Miles; Cincinnati, Ohio
- Occupations: Historian, Professor
- Awards: MacArthur Fellow, Cundill History Prize, Ralph Waldo Emerson Award

Academic background
- Education: Harvard University, Emory University, University of Minnesota

Academic work
- Discipline: History
- Institutions: University of California, Berkeley, University of Michigan, Harvard University
- Website: https://tiyamiles.com/

Tiya Alicia Miles is an American historian. She is Michael Garvey Professor of History at Harvard University and Radcliffe Alumnae Professor at the Radcliffe Institute for Advanced Study. She is a public historian, academic historian, and creative writer whose work explores the intersections of African American, Native American and women's histories. Her research includes African American and Native American interrelated and comparative histories (especially 19th century); Black, Native, and U.S. women's histories; and African American and Native American women's literature. She was a 2011 MacArthur Fellow.

== Life ==
Miles was born and raised in Cincinnati, Ohio. She graduated from Harvard University with an A.B. in 1992, from Emory University with an M.A. in 1995, and from the University of Minnesota with a Ph.D. in 2000. She was an assistant professor at the University of California, Berkeley from 2000 to 2002, and taught at the University of Michigan from 2002 to 2018. She was a School for Advanced Research Resident Scholar from 2007 to 2008.

Her 2021 book All That She Carried, which depicted the lives of American slaves in the south, specifically Rose and her daughter Ashley (Ashley's sack) was awarded the 2021 National Book Award for Nonfiction.

== Awards ==
- 2007: Hiett Prize
- 2006: Frederick Jackson Turner Award
- 2006: Lora Romero Distinguished First Book Award
- 2011: MacArthur Fellowship
- 2018: joint winner, Frederick Douglass Book Prize for The Dawn of Detroit
- 2021: National Book Award for Nonfiction for All That She Carried: The Journey of Ashley's Sack, a Black Family Keepsake
- 2022: Ralph Waldo Emerson Award
- 2022: Cundill History Prize for All That She Carried
- 2022: joint winner, Frederick Douglass Book Prize for All That She Carried
- 2024: shortlisted for the Women's Prize for Non-Fiction for All That She Carried

== Works ==
- Ties That Bind: The Story of an Afro-Cherokee Family in Slavery and Freedom. University of California Press. 2005. ISBN 9780520241329.
- Miles, Tiya; Holland, Sharon P., eds. (2006). Crossing Waters, Crossing Worlds: The African Diaspora in Indian Country. Duke University Press. ISBN 9780822338659.
- The House on Diamond Hill: A Cherokee Plantation Story. University of North Carolina Press. 2010. ISBN 9780807834183.
- "Why the Freedmen Fight". The New York Times. September 15, 2011.
- Tales from the Haunted South: Dark Tourism and Memories of Slavery from the Civil War Era. University of North Carolina Press. 2015. ISBN 9781469626345.
- The Dawn of Detroit: A Chronicle of Slavery and Freedom in the City of the Straits. The New Press. 2017. ISBN 9781620972311.
- All That She Carried: The Journey of Ashley's Sack, a Black Family Keepsake. Random House. 2021. ISBN 9781984854995.
- Wild Girls: How the Outdoors Shaped the Women Who Challenged a Nation. W. W. Norton. 2023. ISBN 9781324020875.
- Night Flyer: Harriet Tubman and the Faith Dreams of a Free People. Penguin Random House. 2024. ISBN 9780593491164.
