= Jeff Forret =

American historian

- Born: 1972 (age 53–54); Calamus, Iowa, USA
- Spouse: Sharon Hord Forret
- Relatives: Monica Forret (sister)
- Awards: Frederick Douglass Prize; Leadership in History Award

Academic background
- Education: B.A., 1995, St. Ambrose University; M.A., 1998, University of North Carolina at Charlotte; PhD, 2003, University of Delaware

Jeff Forret (born 1972) is an American historian and professor at Lamar University.

== Early life and education ==
Forret was born in 1972 in Calamus, Iowa to parents Jim and Velma Forret. He earned his Bachelor of Arts degree from St. Ambrose University and his Master's degree from the University of North Carolina at Charlotte before enrolling at the University of Delaware for his PhD. His older sister Monica Forret is also an academic, working as a professor of Business Administration and Managerial Studies at St. Ambrose University.

== Career ==
Upon earning his PhD, Forret accepted adjunct instructor positions at Vance–Granville Community College and the University of North Carolina at Charlotte before joining James Madison University as a visiting assistant professor. He spent two years at James Madison before joining the department of history at Lamar University as assistant professor in 2005. Following his first year at Lamar, Forret published his first book Race Relations at the Margins: Slaves and Poor Whites in the Antebellum Southern Countryside with Louisiana State University Press. The book focused on the relations between rural poor whites and enslaved people from 1820 and 1860.

From 2009 until 2015, Forret held the rank of associate professor in the Department of History. During this time, he published his second book Slavery in the United States as part of the "Issues and Controversies in American History" series. The book was focused on the roles slaves and the slave trade played in American history, such as the American Revolution and the creation of the U.S. Constitution. Upon his promotion to full professor in 2015, Forret published two books: Slave Against Slave: Plantation Violence in the Old South and the co-edited anthology New Directions in Slavery Studies. His book Slave Against Slave: Plantation Violence in the Old South won the 2016 Frederick Douglass Prize for "the best book written in English on slavery or abolition", was a finalist for the Harriet Tubman Book Prize, and was an honorable mention at the PROSE Awards in the U.S. history category. In 2015, Forret received the William Nelson Cromwell Foundation Research Fellowship to research his fifth book Williams’ Gang: A Slave Trader, His Cargo, and Justice in the Old South. A Summer Stipend from the National Endowment for the Humanities in March 2016 also supported that project.

Forret was named University Scholar Award winner for 2016, and Distinguished Faculty Research Fellow from 2016 to 2019 and again from 2019 until 2021. He published Williams’ Gang: A Notorious Slave Trader and His Cargo of Black Convicts in 2020. The book explores Washington, D.C., slave trader William H. Williams and one shipment of enslaved convicts he carried into New Orleans, a story that he links to the modern mass incarceration of African-Americans in the United States. It won the 2021 Leadership in History Award in the large press category from the American Association for State and Local History. Forret delivered Lamar University's 34th Annual Distinguished Faculty Lecture in March 2021.

== Personal life ==
Forret and his wife Sharon have one son together.

== Publications ==
- Southern Scoundrels: Grifters and Graft in the Nineteenth Century. Baton Rouge: LSU Press, 2021, co-edited with Bruce E. Baker. ISBN 978-0807172193
- Williams' Gang: A Notorious Slave Trader and His Cargo of Black Convicts. New York: Cambridge University Press, 2020. ISBN 978-1108493031
- Slave against Slave: Plantation Violence in the Old South. Baton Rouge: LSU Press, 2015. ISBN 978-0807174319
- New Directions in Slavery Studies: Commodification, Community, and Comparison. Baton Rouge: LSU Press, 2015, co-edited with Christine Sears. ISBN 978-0807161159
- Slavery in the United States. New York: Facts on File, 2012. ISBN 978-0816081158
- Race Relations at the Margins: Slaves and Poor Whites in the Antebellum Southern Countryside. Baton Rouge: LSU Press, 2006. ISBN 978-0807137123
