= The Problem of Slavery in Western Culture =

1966 nonfiction book written by David Brion Davis

- Author: David Brion Davis
- Language: English
- Genre: Non-fiction
- Publication date: 1966

The Problem of Slavery in Western Culture is a nonfiction book written by David Brion Davis, originally published by Cornell University Press in 1966, then republished in 1988 by Oxford University Press. The book won the Pulitzer Prize for General Nonfiction in 1967 and became a National Book Award finalist.
