= James F. Brooks =

American historian

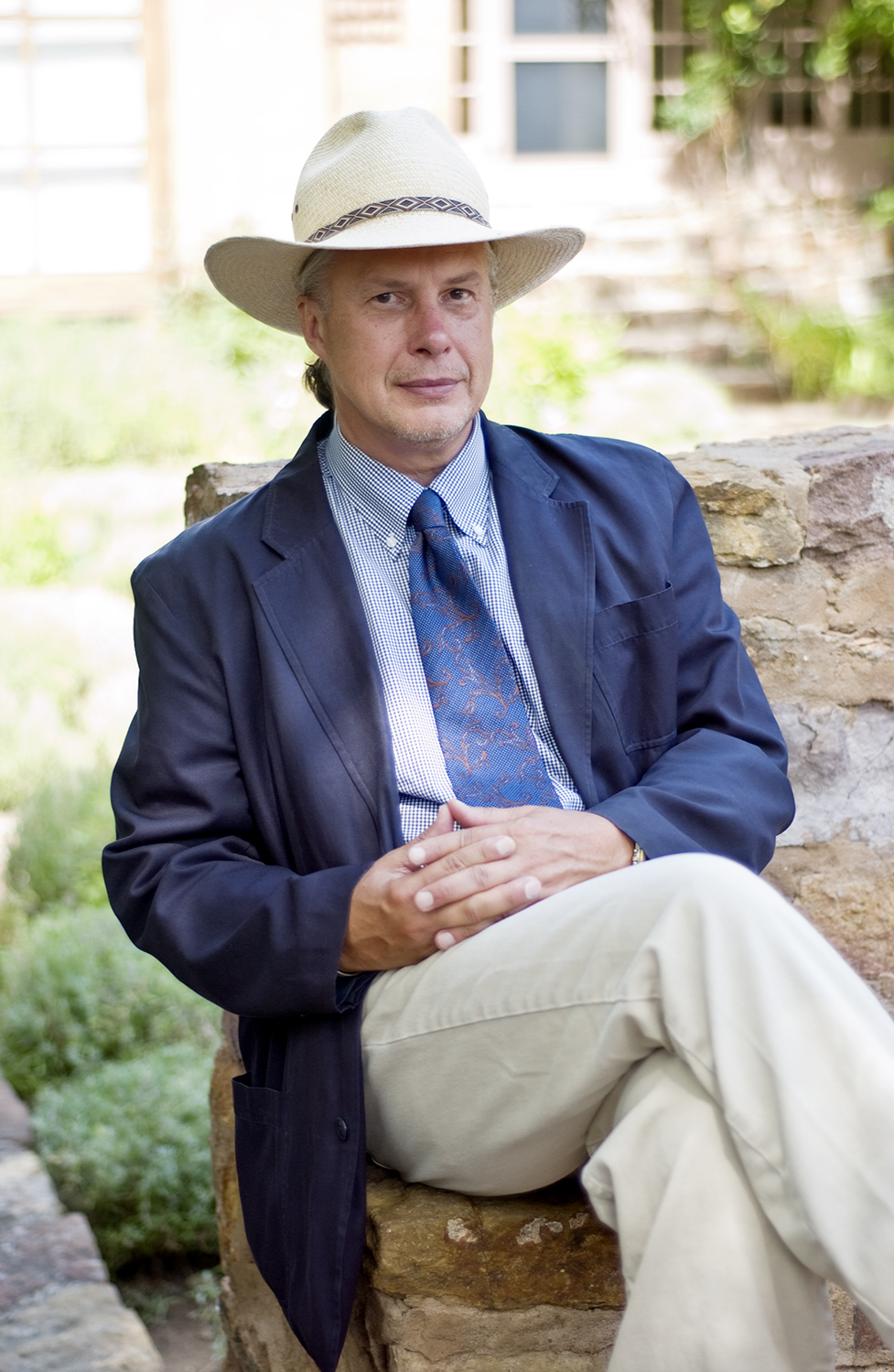
- Born: February 5, 1955 (age 71)
- Education: University of California, Davis
- Occupation: Historian
- Writing career
- Genre: Non-fiction

James F. Brooks is an American historian whose work on slavery, captivity and kinship in the Southwest Borderlands was honored with major national history awards: the Bancroft Prize, Francis Parkman Prize, the Frederick Jackson Turner Award and the Frederick Douglass Prize (second prize). He is the Gable Professor of Early American History at the University of Georgia, and Research Professor Emeritus of History and Anthropology at the University of California, Santa Barbara, where he serves as senior contributing editor of the journal The Public Historian

== Early life and education ==
Brooks graduated from University of California, Davis, with a Ph.D. in history. Before pursuing his career in academia, Brooks worked for a decade in the publishing and advertising industry in Colorado.

== Career ==
An interdisciplinary scholar of the indigenous and colonial past, Brooks has held professorial appointments at the University of Maryland, UC Santa Barbara, and UC Berkeley, and the University of Georgia, as well as fellowships at the Institute for Advanced Study in Princeton and the Robert Penn Warren Center for the Humanities at Vanderbilt University.

Brooks was a Resident Scholar at the School for Advanced Research in Santa Fe, New Mexico from 2000–2001, and later joined the staff as Editor of SAR Press. In August 2005, Brooks became President and CEO of the School.

His books and articles have received more than a dozen national awards for scholarly excellence. His 2002 monograph Captives & Cousins: Slavery, Kinship and Community in the Southwest Borderlands focused on the traffic in women and children across the region as expressions of intercultural violence and accommodation. He extends these questions most recently through an essay on the eighteenth and nineteenth century Pampas borderlands of Argentina in his co-edited advanced seminar volume, Small Worlds: Method, Meaning, and Narrative in Microhistory from SAR Press. His 2016 book, MESA OF SORROWS: A HISTORY OF THE AWAT'OVI MASSACRE (WW Norton) earned the Caughey Prize for the most distinguished book on the history of the American West, and the Erminie Wheller-Voegelin Award for the best work of Ethnohistory from the American Society for Ethnohistory

David Brion Davis commented when making the Frederick Douglass Prize second prize for Captives and Cousins: Slavery, Kinship, and Community in the Southwest Borderlands:

"Until James F. Brooks, virtually all historians of American slavery have ignored the Spanish Southwest—the region acquired by the U.S. in 1848, as a result of the Mexican War. Brooks portrays and analyzes forms of slavery and captivity among the Indians and Spanish that differed markedly from the Anglo-American bondage to the east."

== Works ==
- Captives and Cousins: Slavery, Kinship, and Community in the Southwest Borderlands. The University of North Carolina Press. December 4, 2001. ISBN 978-0-8078-5382-5.
- James F. Brooks, ed. (2002). Confounding the Color Line: The (American) Indian - Black Experience in North America. University of Nebraska Press. ISBN 978-0-8032-6194-5.
- Mesa of Sorrows: A History of the Awat'ovi Massacre Awat'ovi Pueblo (WW Norton 2016).

== Awards ==
The following awards were all for Captives and Cousins (2002)

- 2003 Bancroft Prize
- 2003 Francis Parkman Prize
- 2003 Frederick Jackson Turner Award
- 2003 Frederick Douglass Prize second prize
- 2003 Erminie Wheeler Voegelin Prize, American Society for Ethnohistory

Awards for Mesa of Sorrows 2016 Caughey Western History Prize, Western Historical Association 2016 Erminie Wheeler Voegelin Prize, American Society for Ethnohistory
