= Jennifer L. Morgan =

American historian (born 1966)

- Born: Jennifer Lyle Morgan; 1966 (age 59–60); Syracuse, New York, U.S.
- Spouse: Herman L. Bennett
- Parent(s): John P. Morgan and Claudia B. Morgan
- Awards: MacArthur Fellowship; Frederick Douglass Book Prize

Academic background
- Education: Oberlin College (B.A.); Duke University (Ph.D.)

Jennifer Lyle Morgan (born 1966) is an American historian of United States history, focusing on 16th and 17th century African-American history and the development of slavery in the Atlantic World through the lens of gender. She is a professor of History in the Department of Social and Cultural Analysis and the Department of History at New York University. She is a 2024 MacArthur Fellow.

== Life ==
Morgan graduated from Oberlin College in 1986 with a BA in Third World Studies, a self-designed major. She has credited much of her later academic success to Adrienne Lash Jones, Oberlin's third tenured Black professor and the first tenured Black professor in the Africana studies department. Morgan earned her PhD in history from Duke University in 1995. Her dissertation was titled Laboring women: Enslaved women, reproduction, and slavery in Barbados and South Carolina, 1650–1750.

Morgan's first book, Laboring Women, was published in 2004. It discusses the experiences of enslaved women in colonial Barbados and South Carolina, including how enslavers exploited the reproduction of enslaved women to grow their labor force.

Her second book, Reckoning with Slavery (2021), is an analysis of accounting practices by enslavers. It won both the Mary Nickliss Prize in Women's and/or Gender History from the Organization of American Historians and the Frederick Douglass Book Prize from the Gilder Lehrman Center for the Study of Slavery, Resistance, and Abolition.

Morgan appeared in the 2023 Netflix documentary Stamped from the Beginning.

As of 2024, Morgan is working on a third book, The Eve of Slavery, which will examine "African women in seventeenth-century North America," including the story of Elizabeth Key, an enslaved woman who successfully sued for her freedom.

Morgan lives in New York City. She is currently a fellow at the Cullman Center for Scholars and Writers at the New York Public Library.

== Publications ==
=== Books ===
- Laboring Women: Gender and Reproduction in the Making of New World Slavery (University of Pennsylvania Press, 2004)
- Connexions: Histories of Race and Sex in America (University of Illinois Press, 2016), co-editor
- Reckoning with Slavery: Gender, Kinship and Capitalism in the Early Black Atlantic (Duke University Press, 2021)

=== Articles ===
- Morgan, Jennifer L. (1997). ""Some Could Suckle over Their Shoulder": Male Travelers, Female Bodies, and the Gendering of Racial Ideology, 1500–1770". The William and Mary Quarterly. 54 (1): 167–192. doi:10.2307/2953316. ISSN 0043-5597. JSTOR 2953316.
- Morgan, Jennifer L. (2016-10-01). "Accounting for "The Most Excruciating Torment": Gender, Slavery, and Trans-Atlantic Passages". History of the Present. 6 (2): 184–207. doi:10.5406/historypresent.6.2.0184. ISSN 2159-9785.
- Morgan, Jennifer L. (2018-03-01). "Partus sequitur ventrem". Small Axe: A Caribbean Journal of Criticism. 22 (1): 1–17. doi:10.1215/07990537-4378888. ISSN 0799-0537.

=== Chapters ===
- Morgan, Jennifer L. (2009). ""Women's Sweat": Gender and Agricultural Labor in the Atlantic World". In Radway, Janice A.; Gaines, Kevin; Shank, Barry; Von Eschen, Penny (eds.). American Studies: An Anthology. John Wiley & Sons. ISBN 978-1-4051-1351-9.
- Morgan, Jennifer L. (2011). "Gender and Family Life". In Heuman, Gad J.; Burnard, Trevor (eds.). The Routledge history of slavery. The Routledge histories. London; New York: Routledge. ISBN 978-0-415-46689-9.
- Morgan, Jennifer L. (2019). Willis, Deborah; Toscano, Ellyn; Nelson, Kalia Brooks (eds.). Women and Migration: Responses in Art and History. Open Book Publishers. ISBN 978-1-78374-568-5.
