= Jan Vansina =

Belgian historian and anthropologist

- Born: 14 September 1929; Antwerp, Belgium
- Died: 8 February 2017 (aged 87); Madison, Wisconsin, U.S.
- Education: Catholic University of Leuven
- Scientific career
- Fields: African history
- Workplaces: University of Wisconsin–Madison
- Doctoral students: David Newbury

Jan M. J. Vansina (14 September 1929 – 8 February 2017) was a Belgian historian and anthropologist regarded as an authority on the history of Central Africa, especially of what is now the Democratic Republic of the Congo, Rwanda, and Burundi. He was a major innovator in the historical methodology of oral tradition. As a professor at the University of Wisconsin–Madison, he taught several generations of students and, according to a biographer, "set the pace in African historical studies from the 1950s into the 1990s."

== Biography ==
Vansina was first trained as a medievalist and ethnographer but became known as one of the most prominent Africanist scholars. In his work, he focused on the history of African societies prior to European contact, and is widely regarded as the foremost authority on the history of the peoples of Central Africa. He published widely on the subject, including a landmark text on the factual interpretation of oral history. David Henige wrote that Vansina's Oral tradition (1965) was one of the most influential works written about African history. Historian David Beach writes, "In 1985, Jan Vansina's Oral Tradition as History provided a worldwide theoretical framework on oral tradition that rendered nearly all of its predecessors obsolete."

Vansina obtained his doctorate in history from the Catholic University of Leuven in 1957. After his retirement in 1994, he became a professor emeritus at the University of Wisconsin–Madison and lived in Madison, Wisconsin. Vansina died of lung cancer in Madison.

Vansina assisted Alex Haley (the author of the 1976 novel Roots: The Saga of an American Family) in deciphering several African words that had been handed down from Haley's ancestors, determining that they were of Mandinka origin.

== Selected works ==
- Vansina, Jan (1965). Oral Tradition. A Study in Historical Methodology (Translated from the French by H. M. Wright). London: Routledge & Kegan Paul.
- Vansina, Jan (1966). Kingdoms of the Savanna. Madison: University of Wisconsin Press.
- Vansina, Jan (1978). The Children of Woot. A History of the Kuba Peoples. Madison: University of Wisconsin Press.
- Vansina, Jan (1985). Oral Tradition as History. Madison: University of Wisconsin Press.
- Vansina, Jan (1990). Paths in the Rainforests. Madison: The University of Wisconsin Press.
- Vansina, Jan (1994). Living With Africa. Madison: The University of Wisconsin Press.
- Vansina, Jan (2004). Antecedents to Modern Rwanda: The Nyiginya Kingdom (Translated from the French by the author). Africa and the Diaspora series. Madison: University of Wisconsin Press.
- Vansina, Jan (2004). How Societies Are Born: Governance in West Central Africa Before 1600. Charlottesville: University of Virginia Press.
- Vansina, Jan (2010). Being Colonized: The Kuba Experience in Rural Congo, 1880–1960. Madison: University of Wisconsin Press.
- Vansina, Jan (2014). Through the Day, through the Night. A Flemish Belgian Boyhood and World War II. Madison: University of Wisconsin Press.
