= Sydney Nathans =

American historian

- Born: May 24, 1940 (age 86)

Academic background
- Education: PhD, 1969, Johns Hopkins University
- Thesis: Daniel Webster and the Whig party 1828-1844. (1969)

Academic work
- Institutions: Duke University

Sydney Harold Nathans (born May 24, 1940) is an American historian who is a professor emeritus at Duke University and has written several history books including To Free a Family: The Journey of Mary Walker and A Mind to Stay: White Plantation, Black Homeland.

== Early life and education ==
Nathans was born on May 24, 1940. By the age of eight, his family (consisting of his merchant father, mother, and sister), had lived in five different states. He was educated at San Jacinto High School in Texas, where he won the 1958 National High School Oratorical Contest.

== Career ==
Upon earning his PhD, Nathans accepted a faculty appointment in Duke University's history department. He published his first book in 1973 titled Daniel Webster and Jacksonian Democracy through the Johns Hopkins University Press. The book focused on the establishment of the political party Whig and one of its founders, Daniel Webster. In 1978, Nathans travelled across Alabama to see if he could locate descendants of enslaved African Americans in order to gain a better understanding of the Great Migration. There, he encountered Alice Hargress, whose story he based his book on titled A Mind to Stay: White Plantation, Black Homeland. Hargress described the migration of 114 black slaves from North Carolina to a 1600-acre plantation in Alabama where they eventually purchased their freedom. He received a Guggenheim Fellowship in 1980 to assist in his research.

In 1984, Nathans edited the University of North Carolina Press and NC Division of Archives and History five-volume series The Way We Lived in North Carolina, which received the American Historical Association's James Harvey Robinson Prize. A few years later, he continued his research into the history of black migration in America by following the story of Mary Walker in Glastonbury, Connecticut. Nathan came into contact with Walker's descendants and wrote her story of escaping slavery in his 2012 book To Free a Family: The Journey of Mary Walker. It would go on to receive the 2013 Frederick Douglass Prize from the Gilder Lehrman Institute of American History as "the best book written in English on slavery or abolition."

== Selected publications ==
- Daniel Webster and Jacksonian Democracy. The Johns Hopkins University Press, 1973.
- The Quest for Progress: The Way We Lived in North Carolina, 1870-1920. University of North Carolina Press, 1983.
- To Free a Family: The Journey of Mary Walker. Harvard University Press, 2012.
- A Mind to Stay: White Plantation, Black Homeland. Harvard University Press, 2017.
- Freedom's Mirage: Virgil Bennehan's Odyssey from Emancipation to Exile. University of North Carolina Press, 2024.
