= David G. Roskies =

Canadian literary scholar, cultural historian and author

David Roskies
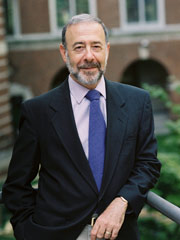
- Born: 1948 (age 77–78); Montreal, Quebec, Canada
- Education: Brandeis University

David G. Roskies (Yiddish: דוד ראָסקעס; born 1948) is a Canadian literary scholar, cultural historian, and author in the field of Yiddish literature and the culture of Eastern European Jewry. He is the Sol and Evelyn Henkind Chair in Yiddish Literature and Culture and Professor of Jewish Literature at the Jewish Theological Seminary of America.

== Biography ==
Roskies was born in 1948 in Montreal, where his family emigrated in 1940 from Vilnius. His grandmother, Fradl Matz, ran the Matz Press publishing house in Vilna (now Vilnius, Lithuania), that produced prayer books, bibles and popular Yiddish literature. His mother, Masha and her family were forced to flee Europe for Montreal, via Lisbon and New York City in 1940. Her Montreal home became a salon for Yiddish writers, actors, and artists such as Isaac Singer, Melech Ravitch, Itsik Manger, Avrom Sutzkever, and Rachel Korn. His sister is Ruth Wisse, professor of Yiddish at Harvard University.

After learning in Yiddish secular schools in Montreal, Roskies was educated at Brandeis University, where he received his doctorate in 1975.

== Research areas ==
One major focus of his work is the Holocaust, on which topic he published, in 1971, Night Words: A Midrash on the Holocaust, one of the first liturgies on the subject ever to appear. Night Words has entered its fifth edition, was translated into Hebrew, and was reissued by CLAL as an audiobook.

In 1984, Harvard University Press published Against the Apocalypse: Responses to Catastrophe in Modern Jewish Culture, which won the Ralph Waldo Emerson Prize from Phi Beta Kappa and has since been translated into Russian and Hebrew. A companion volume, The Literature of Destruction, was published by the Jewish Publication Society in 1989.

In 2007, Roskies served as the J. B. and Maurice C. Shapiro Senior Scholar-in-Residence at the United States Holocaust Memorial Museum. In 2013, he published Holocaust Literature: A History and Guide with Naomi Diamant.

A second focus of his work, since 1975, has been the folklore of Ashkenazic Jewry. He coauthored The Shtetl Book: An Introduction to East European Jewish Life and Lore. Awarded a Guggenheim Fellowship in 1985, Roskies began studying the modern Jewish return to folklore and fantasy. The fruits of his labor are the edition of The Dybbuk and Other Writings by S. Ansky (Yale, 1992) and the book A Bridge of Longing: The Lost Art of Yiddish Storytelling (Harvard, 1995). A thirtieth-anniversary edition of The Shtetl Book, meanwhile, was put out by KTAV Publishing House in 2005.

A third focus of Roskies' work is The Jewish Search for a Usable Past, the title of a book of related essays published in 1999. Then, in 2008, he finally tried his hand at writing a memoir. Yiddishlands: A Memoir (Wayne State University Press) is the story of modern Yiddish culture as told through the lens of family history and the medium of Yiddish song. A CD of his mother singing accompanies the volume.

In 1981 (with Alan Mintz), Roskies cofounded Prooftexts: A Journal of Jewish Literary History. Roskies has served since 1998 as editor-in-chief of the New Yiddish Library, published by Yale University Press.

== Works ==
- David G. Roskies: Night Words: A Midrasch about the Holocaust. Clal, 1971.
- Diane K. Roskies, David G. Roskies: The Shtetl Book: An Introduction To East European Jewish Life And Lore. Ktav Publishing House, New York, 1975
- David G. Roskies: Against the Apocalypse: Responses to Catastrophe in Modern Jewish Culture. Harvard University Press, 1984
- David G. Roskies (Ed.): The Literature of Destruction: Jewish Responses to Catastrophe. Jewish Publication Society, Philadelphia, 1989
- David G. Roskies (Ed.): The Dybbuk and Other Writings by S. Ansky. Yale, 1992
- David G. Roskies: A Bridge of Longing: The Lost Art of Yiddish Storytelling. Harvard, 1995
- David G. Roskies: The Jewish Search for a Usable Past (Helen and Martin Schwartz Lectures in Jewish Studies). Indiana University Press, Bloomington, 1999
- David Roskies (Ed.), Leonard Wolf (Ed. and Trans.): Introduction to Itzik Manger, The World According to Itzik: Selected Poetry and Prose. New Haven, Yale University Press, 2002.
- Melvin Jules Bukiet and David G. Roskies (Eds.) : Scribblers on the Roof: Contemporary Jewish Fiction. Persea, New York, 2006.
- David G. Roskies: Yiddishlands: A Memoir. Wayne State University Press, 2008
- David G. Roskies and Naomi Diamant: Holocaust Literature: A History and Guide. University Press of New England, 2013
