= Albert William Levi =

American philosopher (1911–1988)

Albert William Levi (June 19, 1911 – October 31, 1988) was an American philosopher.

Albert William Levi was born on June 19, 1911, in Indianapolis, Indiana. He received an AB in sociology from Dartmouth College in 1932 and an AM (1933) and PhD (1935) from the University of Chicago. His AM and PhD theses were on Plato and John Stuart Mill, respectively.

Levi taught at Dartmouth, Chicago, Black Mountain College, and briefly at two universities in Austria, before becoming a faculty member at Washington University in St. Louis, where he was named the David May Distinguished University Professor of the Humanities in 1965. After his retirement from the Arts and Sciences at Washington University in St. Louis in 1979, he became the Andrew W. Mellon Professor of the Humanities at Tulane University.

Levi published over 70 articles and 10 books. His research interests included philosophy of culture, the history of modern philosophy, social philosophy, metaphysics, and aesthetics. He received the Ralph Waldo Emerson Award for his book Philosophy and the Modern World (1959). In 1966, President Lyndon B. Johnson appointed Levi to the National Council on the Humanities, the governing body of the National Endowment for the Humanities.

He died on October 31, 1988, in University City, Missouri.

== Sources ==
- Kavanaugh, John F. (1991). "Lived Humanism: The Aesthetic Education of Albert William Levi". Journal of Aesthetic Education. 25 (4): 21–30. doi:10.2307/3332899. JSTOR 3332899.
