= Inhuman Bondage =

2006 book by David Brion Davis

Inhuman Bondage: The Rise and Fall of Slavery in the New World
- Author: David Brion Davis
- Language: English
- Genre: History, Slavery
- Publisher: Oxford University Press
- Publication date: 2006
- Publication place: United States
- Pages: 440
- ISBN: 978-0195339444
- OCLC: 62281901

Inhuman Bondage: The Rise and Fall of Slavery in the New World is a book by American cultural and intellectual historian David Brion Davis, published by Oxford University Press in 2006. It recounts the history of slavery in a global context. It was praised widely as a full and comprehensive rendering of the subject and won the 2007 Ralph Waldo Emerson Award.

Davis, a leading authority on slavery in the western world, has said the impetus for the book began as a series of lectures for a course he taught on slavery at Yale in 1994. Davis' own interest in slavery began with his experiences with the segregation and sometimes mistreatment of black soldiers when he was stationed in Germany as an eighteen-year-old sailor during the last days of World War II.

== Premise ==
Inhuman Bondage: The Rise and Fall of Slavery in the New World traces slavery from its ancient foundations through the long evolution of antiblack racism. Davis iterates time and again that slavery played a crucial role in the building of the United States, from the emergence of the American colonies to laying the foundation for "...everything America was to become". In laying out a more precise definition of the term slavery, Davis expands Orlando Patterson's definition—that of extreme "permanent, violent, and personal domination of natally alienated and generally dishonored persons"—to incorporate the attribution to humans of 'animalization', which allows the master to deny any redeeming rational and spiritual qualities to the enslaved that would otherwise bind the two together. Unlike many scholarly efforts, Davis does not devote the entire book to the Atlantic slave trade. Instead he highlights the international character of the slave trade through intervening perspectives and factors such as nations, politicians, the media, and both black and white abolitionism.

== Contents ==
Relying heavily on the account laid out in Howard Jones' Mutiny on the Amistad: The Saga of a Slave Revolt and Its Impact on American Abolition, Law, and Diplomacy (New York, 1987; rev ed., 1988), as well as on court records, newspaper accounts, and other primary sources, Davis begins the book by using what happened on the 19th century ship, La Amistad, because he believes the case illustrated how the American justice system of the time dealt with the multinational character of the Atlantic slave trade. He goes on to cover slavery during antiquity, a comprehensive account of the origins of anti-black racism, slavery in Brazil and the Caribbean, American slavery in colonial America and Mexico, the French Revolution, the Haitian Revolution, the involvement of Africans in the slave trade, national politics of slavery in the United States, 2 chapters on the characteristic brand of 19th-century slavery in the southern United States, the Civil War, two chapters on British and American abolitionism, and emancipation.

== Critical reception ==
The book received universal acclaim as a comprehensive and career capping effort on the part of the author and the subject matter. Pulitzer Prize winning author Eric Foner called Inhuman Bondage "one of the finest one-volume histories of the rise and fall of modern slavery."
