= Gwendolen M. Carter =

Canadian political scientist

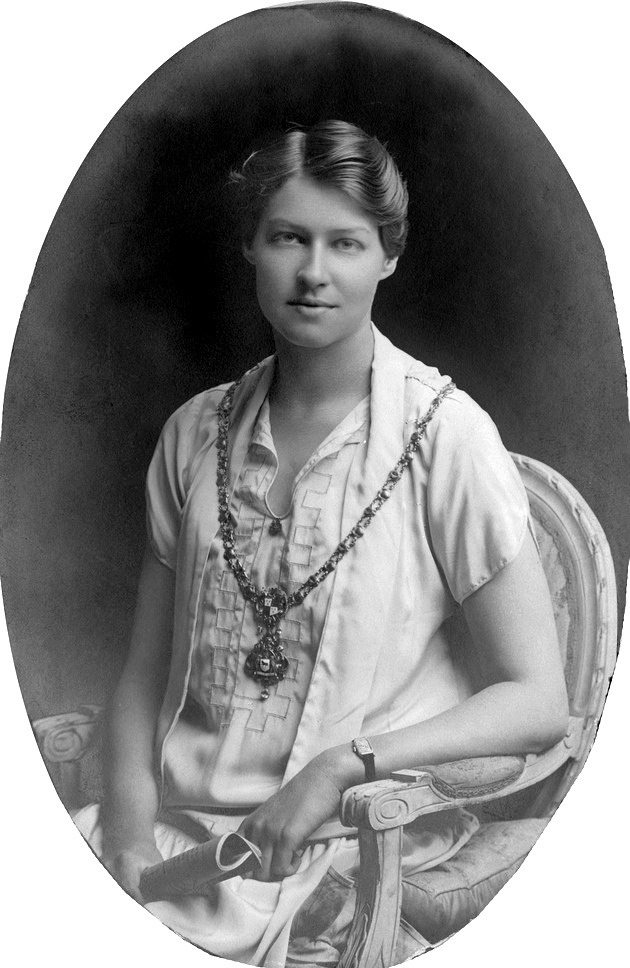
A photograph of Gwendolen M. Carter from the University of Florida Digital Collections (UFDC)

Professor Gwendolen Margaret Carter (1906–1991) was a Canadian-American political scientist. She was one of the founders of African Studies in the United States, past president of the African Studies Association and was among the most widely known scholars of African affairs in the twentieth century.

== Biography ==
Carter was born in Hamilton, Ontario in 1906. She contracted polio at home as a child, losing the use of her legs for life despite therapy and the care of her physician father. In 1929, she completed her B.A. in history at the University of Toronto. In 1931, she received a second B.A. from Somerville College, Oxford. At Oxford, she served as ceremonial "mayoress" for a day (her uncle was the Mayor at the time) and had a photograph taken as a memento (See image at right). She returned to her hometown to teach at McMaster University until 1935. Carter moved to the United States to undertake graduate study at Radcliffe College, where she completed her M.A. (1936) and Ph.D. (1938) in political science. From 1943 to 1964, she taught political science at Smith College, holding the Sophia Smith chair there from 1961. From 1944 to 1945, she was an Office of Strategic Services (OSS) Research & Analysis Branch (R&A) analyst. In 1948, she became a Naturalized US citizen. From 1964 to 1974, she was Melville J. Herskovits Professor of African Affairs at Northwestern University. In 1965, she was elected a Fellow of the American Academy of Arts and Sciences. From 1974 to 1984, Carter taught at Indiana University. From 1984 to 1987, when she retired, she taught at the University of Florida. Through many years of her professional life, she maintained personal correspondence with leading figures such as Julius Nyerere, Seretse Khama, Gatsha Buthelezi, Steve Biko, and Helen Joseph. She was 84 years old when she died at her home in Orange City, Florida on February 20, 1991.

== Scholarship ==
Carter's early work focused on European state governance, but her scholarship shifted to Africa after her first trip to South Africa in 1948, which coincided with the election that brought the Nationalist government to power and introduced Apartheid. From that point on, she focused on the politics and economies of southern Africa during a career that spanned over forty years. Carter's frequent research trips to South Africa resulted in many publications, several of which have become classics in both political science and African studies.

== Selected works ==
- The Politics of Inequality: South Africa Since 1948. New York: Praeger. 1958. ISBN 978-0-374-91300-7;
- Independence for Africa. New York: Praeger. 1960;
- South Africa's Transkei: The Politics of Domestic Colonialism. Evanston: Northwestern University Press. 1967;
- From Protest to Challenge: A Documentary History of African Politics in South Africa 1882-1964. Karis, Thomas and Gwendolen M. Carter. 4 vols. Stanford, Calif.: Hoover Institution Press. 1972-1977.
- Southern Africa in crisis. Gwendolen M. Carter and Patrick O'Meara (eds.). Bloomington: Indiana University Press. 1977. ISBN 0-253-35399-8.
- Which Way is South Africa Going? Bloomington: Indiana University Press. 1980. ISBN 0-253-10874-8;
- International politics in Southern Africa. Gwendolen Margaret Carter and Patrick O. O'Meara. 1982. Bloomington: Indiana University Press. ISBN 0-253-34285-6.
- African independence: the first twenty-five years. Gwendolen M. Carter and Patrick O. O'Meara (eds.). 1985. Bloomington: Indiana University Press. ISBN 0-253-30255-2.

== Awards and honors ==
- "In 1975, after she left Northwestern, the faculty of the African Studies Program at the university honored her by publishing a book of essays."
- Professor Carter was awarded the African Studies Association's Distinguished Africanist Award in 1984.
- The University of Florida Center for African Studies named its annual conference series in her honor in 1985.
- Carter, along with her colleague and co-editor of From Protest to Challenge... Professor Thomas G. Karis (1919-2017), was (in her case posthumously) awarded the Order of the Companions of O.R. Tambo by the Republic of South Africa in 2014.

== Legacy ==
Northwestern University offers a scholarship in her name (along with that of Kofi Annan, former Secretary General of the United Nations).

Smith College has an endowed position named in her honor (currently held by David Newbury).
