= Frederick Douglass: Prophet of Freedom =

2018 book by David W. Blight

- First edition cover
- Author: David W. Blight
- Audio read by: Prentice Onayemi
- Cover artist: Darren Haggar (design)
- Language: English
- Subject: Frederick Douglass
- Publisher: Simon & Schuster
- Publication date: October 16, 2018
- Publication place: United States
- Media type: Print (hardcover)
- Pages: 912
- Awards: Pulitzer Prize for History (2019); Bancroft Prize (2019)
- ISBN: 978-1-4165-9031-6 (hardcover)
- OCLC: 1022622448
- Dewey Decimal: 973.8092 B
- LC Class: E449.D75 B557 2018

Frederick Douglass: Prophet of Freedom is a 2018 biography of African American abolitionist, writer, and orator Frederick Douglass, written by historian David W. Blight and published by Simon & Schuster. It won the 2019 Pulitzer Prize for History.

== Film adaptation ==
In April 2019, it was reported that a feature film adaptation of the book was being produced by Barack Obama and Michelle Obama in partnership with Netflix. In 2023 it was reported that Regina King will direct the film, with a script by Kemp Powers.

In 2022, Frederick Douglass: In Five Speeches, a documentary film based on the book, was released by HBO on various streaming platforms.

== Awards and honors ==
- 2019 Bancroft Prize, winner
- 2019 Francis Parkman Prize, winner
- 2019 Lincoln Prize, winner
- 2019 Mark Lynton History Prize, shortlist
- 2019 Plutarch Award, winner
- 2019 Pulitzer Prize for History, winner
- 2018 Los Angeles Times Book Prize for Biography, winner
