= Erica Armstrong Dunbar =

American historian

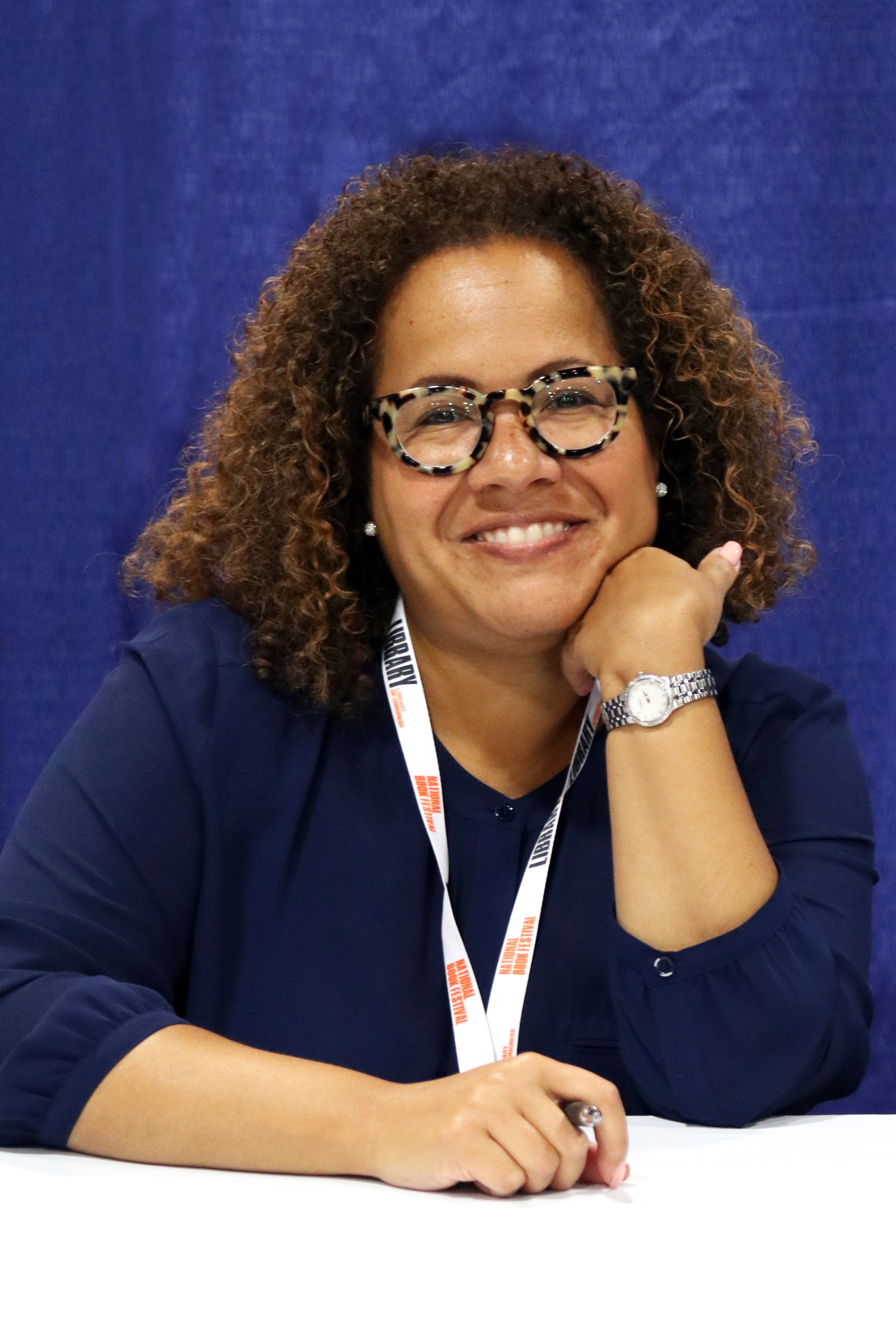
- Author at the 2018 U.S. National Book Festival

Academic background
- Education: University of Pennsylvania, Columbia University

Academic work
- Discipline: History
- Institutions: Rutgers University-New Brunswick

Erica Armstrong Dunbar is an American historian at Emory University. She was previously a distinguished Charles and Mary Beard Professor of History at Rutgers. An historian of African American women and the antebellum United States, Dunbar is the author of A Fragile Freedom: African American Women and Emancipation in the Antebellum City (2008) and Never Caught: The Washingtons’ Relentless Pursuit of Their Runaway Slave, Ona Judge (2017). Never Caught was a National Book Award for Nonfiction finalist and winner of the Frederick Douglass Prize.

== Life ==
Dr. Dunbar attended college at the University of Pennsylvania, then earned an M.A. and Ph.D from Columbia University. She taught at the University of Delaware before joining Rutgers University-New Brunswick in 2017. She is Charles and Mary Beard Professor of History at Rutgers. Her research and teaching focus on the history of African American women and late-eighteenth and early-nineteenth-century United States history.

Her first book was A Fragile Freedom: African American Women and Emancipation in the Antebellum City, published by Yale University Press in 2008. In it she examines the lives black women made in Philadelphia’s large free black community, using documents like friendship albums and personal correspondence, church records, and labor contracts.

In 2017 she published Never Caught: The Washingtons’ Relentless Pursuit of Their Runaway Slave, Ona Judge. Never Caught was a finalist for the 2017 National Book Award for Nonfiction. In November 2018 Dunbar was named joint winner of the Frederick Douglass Prize for Never Caught.

== Works ==
- A Fragile Freedom: African American Women and Emancipation in the Antebellum City (Yale University Press, 2008) ISBN 9780300177022, OCLC 816818622
- Never Caught: The Washingtons' Relentless Pursuit of Their Runaway Slave, Ona Judge (Atria/37 Ink, February 2017) ISBN 9781501126413, OCLC 1019993773
- The Politics of History: A New Generation of American Historians Writes Back with Jim Downs, Timothy Patrick McCarthy, and T.K. Hunter (in progress)
