= Laurent Dubois =

French historian

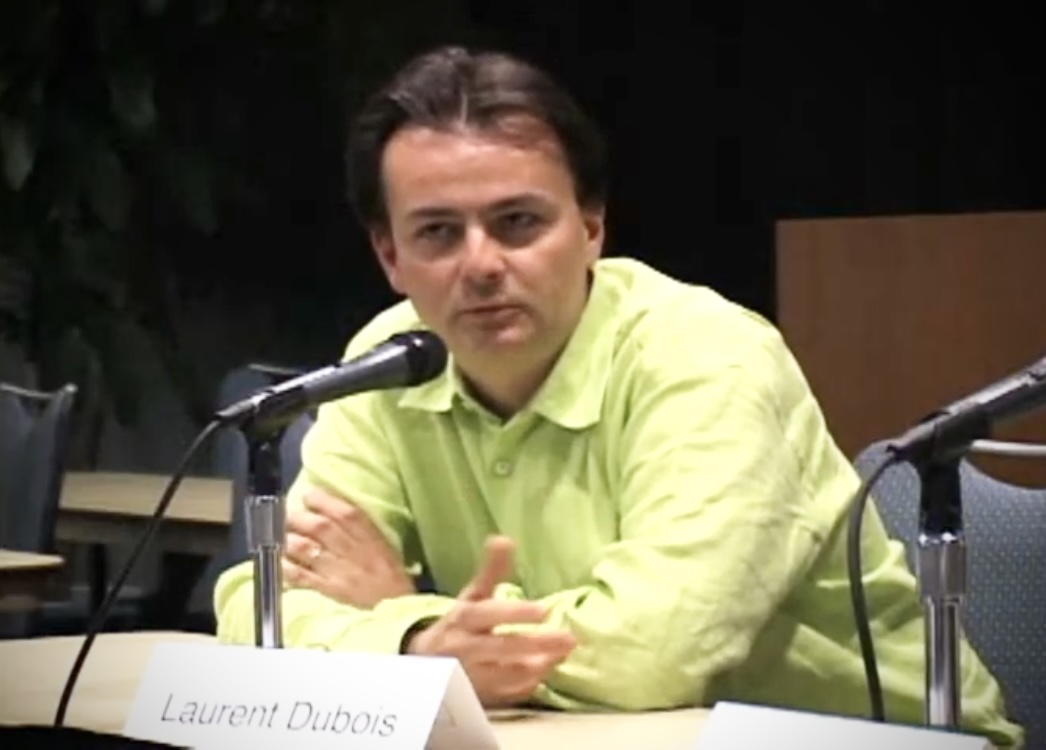
- Dubois speaks in 2010
- Education: Princeton University; Michigan University
- Employer: University of Virginia
- Title: John L Nau III Bicentennial professor of History Director of Academic Affairs, Democracy Institute

Laurent Dubois is the John L. Nau III Bicentennial Professor in the History & Principles of Democracy at the University of Virginia. A specialist on the history and culture of the Atlantic world who studies the Caribbean (particularly Haiti), North America, and France, Dubois joined the University of Virginia in January 2021, and will also serve as the Democracy Initiative's Director for Academic Affairs and the director and lead research convener of the John L. Nau III History and Principles of Democracy Lab. His studies have focused on Haiti.

== Education ==
Dubois was an undergraduate at Princeton University, graduating in 1992, then earned his Ph.D. from University of Michigan at Ann Arbor in 1998.

== Career ==
Dubois's main areas of research deal with the history of Haiti and the politics of soccer. He has received a Guggenheim Fellowship and a National Endowment for the Humanities Fellowship. His book A Colony of Citizens: Revolution and Slave Emancipation in the French Caribbean, 1787-1804 won the 2005 Frederick Douglass Prize.

== Bibliography ==
- Avengers of the New World: The Story of the Haitian Revolution (2004)
- A Colony of Citizens: Revolution and Slave Emancipation in the French Caribbean, 1787-1804 (2004)
- An Enslaved Enlightenment: rethinking the Intellectual History of the French Atlantic (2006)
- Soccer Empire: The World Cup and the Future of France (2010)
- Haiti: The Aftershocks of History (Holt, 2012)
- The Banjo: America's African Instrument (Harvard University Press, 2016)
