= Saltwater Slavery =

2008 book by Stephanie E. Smallwood

Saltwater Slavery: A Middle Passage from Africa to American Diaspora
- Author: Stephanie E. Smallwood
- Publication date: 2007

Saltwater Slavery: A Middle Passage from Africa to American Diaspora is a book by Stephanie E. Smallwood and the 2008 winner of the Frederick Douglass Book Prize. The book attempts to tell the story of enslaved Africans through the accounts of the Royal Africa Company (RAC) from 1675 to 1725.

== Themes ==
=== European Alteration of the Economy of West Africa ===
Smallwood demonstrates that Europeans altered and exploited the economy and political structure of West Africa. The market economy created by demand for slaves created an environment in the West African littoral that, for those marked for forced labor, became an inexorable march towards the slaving ships. European market demands created expansionist policies in the emerging states of West Africa. By supplying these states with guns and access to wealth, Europeans allowed certain groups to establish and maintain hegemony over other groups. These continued conflicts provided captives who were sold to European slave traders, which funded further wars and captures.

=== Commodification ===
One of the most important threads running through Smallwood's book is the process of commodification. This project begins in the introduction, where she contrasts the African slave experience with other migrant experiences: "In place of the networks that link origins and departures, and transform the emigrant into an immigrant, for African captives in the Atlantic system reverberated the traumatic echo of commodification" (18). While other immigrants are allowed to maintain links to their cultures, systems, and geographies, African slaves were deprived of all these. The commodification became complete when slaves were subjected to deprivations that tested the limits of human endurance—all in the name of maximizing profit for the RAC.

Using the slave traders' ledgers, Smallwood shows how the great human drama of the slave trade was reduced to notes and "quantitative 'facts.'" These accounting instruments, packaged as they are in the form to be transmitted to headquarters in London, both conceal and reveal the underlying stories. In order to keep alive the fiction that slaving is no more messy than other forms of commodity-trading, bookkeepers needed the instruments of ledgers and quantities, and they needed to believe in the fungibility of human life. "People, tobacco, gold, and gunpowder, all mutually exchangeable against one another, were able to pass smoothly across transactional lines that separated one account from another" (84).

=== The Middle Passage ===
Another of the projects at play in Saltwater Slavery is a troubling of the very notion of the "middle passage". Smallwood closes the book with an account from a slave named Sibell, noting:

"Sibell's remembered experience cannot fit into the neat temporal and spatial categories that frame my narration of the 'middle passage,' with its orderly narrative progression from African captivity through Atlantic commodification to American slavery...Sibell's narrative suggests that the slave ship charted no course of narrative continuity between the African past and American present, but rather memorialized an indeterminate passage marked by the impossibility of full narrative closure" (164).

To the African on a slave ship, there was nothing about the ordeal on a slave ship that implied linear progression to a known end. Rather, every moment was a rupture—a complete disintegration of previously understood experience. She calls the slaves' time on the ship an "experience of motion without discernible direction or destination" (122). Slaves had little idea where they were being taken or what was to be required of them when they arrived. Thus, to talk about the Atlantic slave ship experience as the "middle passage" does not correspond to the lived experiences of slaves themselves.

=== Diaspora ===
Smallwood reveals the stop-and-start nature of early diasporic attempts by African slaves. In the process of being removed to the Americas, slaves were deprived of the kin relations through which many African societies established the identities of their component members. Without connection to their kin structures or their ancestors' homelands, these Africans were unable to create a continuity of their lives with those of their ancestors. In addition, these Africans, especially the early slaves that Smallwood speaks of in the period 1675–1725, were unable to raise children of their own in the New World. She writes, "Their only heirs were those who trailed after them on the returning slave ships, to take the place of dead and departed saltwater laborers…" (160). Deprived of the ability to put down roots in the New World, these slaves were doubly robbed of identity: that of the one they left behind and that of the one they could not create in the Americas. Not until the 1720s were slaves able to raise American-born children and establish a surviving, sustainable community.

== Form ==
Smallwood's text engages with the most fundamental difficulty for any person who attempts to write the history of the Atlantic slave trade: very few accounts of the slaves themselves are extant. Instead, we must use the accounts of Europeans in order to attempt to reconstruct the lived experiences of African slaves. Using the body of data (both numerical and anecdotal) that European slave traders left behind, Smallwood rescues some of the static "stages" used to describe the Atlantic slave trade—the African Gold Coast, the middle passage, and the American slave market—by bringing to life the forces that defined these arenas.
