= The Diligent =

2002 book by Robert W. Harms about history of slave trade from 1731 onward

The Diligent: A Voyage Through the Worlds of the Slave Trade
- Author: Robert W. Harms
- Published: 2002
- Publisher: Basic Books
- Pages: 496 pp.
- ISBN: 9780465028726

The Diligent: A Voyage Through the Worlds of the Slave Trade is a 2002 book by Robert W. Harms in which he offers a history of slave trade from 1731 onward. It is a winner of the Frederick Douglass Prize, the J. Russell Major Prize, the Mark Lynton History Prize and the Gustav Ranis International Book Prize.
