= Patrick O. O'Meara =

American political scientist (1938–2021)

Patrick O'Meara with Mikhail Gorbachev

Patrick O. O'Meara (7 January 1938 – 30 March 2021) was a South African-born author of Rhodesia: Racial Conflict or Co-Existence?, Southern Africa in Crisis (co-editor, Gwendolen M. Carter), and Africa (co-editor, Phyllis Martin).

O’Meara was a professor of political science and vice president emeritus of Indiana University.

== Works ==
- Rhodesia: Racial Conflict or Co-Existence? (1975), Ithaca and London Cornell University Press, ASIN: B000P74RUC
- Southern Africa in Crisis (1977), co-editor, Gwendolen M. Carter, Indiana University Press, ISBN 0253353998
- Africa (1977), co-editor, Phyllis Martin, Indiana University Press, ISBN 0253209846
- Southern Africa: The Continuing Crisis (A Midland Book), 1979, co-editor, Gwendolen M. Carter, ISBN 0253202264
- International Politics in Southern Africa (A Midland Book), 1982, co-editor, Gwendolen M. Carter, ISBN 0253342856
- Globalization and the Challenges of a New Century 2000, Indiana University Press, ISBN 025321355X
- Changing Perspectives on International Education, 2001, Indiana University Press, ISBN 0253338166

== Honours ==
- John W. Ryan Award for International Programs, 1993
- Thomas Hart Benton Medallion, 1994
- Indiana University President's Medal for Excellence, 2011
- Golden Cross of Merit of the Republic of Hungary

== See also ==
- O. Timothy O'Meara (brother)
