= History in Africa =

- Discipline: History
- Language: English
- Edited by: Lorelle D. Semley

Publication details
- History: 1974-present
- Publisher: Cambridge University Press on behalf of the African Studies Association
- Frequency: Annual

Standard abbreviations
- ISO 4: Hist. Afr.

Indexing
- ISSN: 0361-5413 (print); 1558-2744 (web)
- LCCN: 76640560
- OCLC no.: 612410683

Links
- Journal homepage; Online access; Online archive

History in Africa: A Journal of Debates, Methods, and Source Analysis is an annual peer-reviewed academic journal covering the historiography and methodology of African history. It is published by Cambridge University Press on behalf of the African Studies Association. The editor-in-chief is Lorelle D. Semley, a historian at Boston College. Other editors of the journal include Teresa Barnes (University of Illinois, Urbana-Champaign), Bayo Holsey (Emory University), and Egodi Uchendu (University of Nigeria).

== History ==
The journal was established in 1974 with an introduction by founding editor David Henige entitled, "On Method: An Apologia and A Plea." In 2020, the journal announced a new editorial team composed entirely of Black and African women, led by editor-in-chief Lorelle D. Semley.
