= Race and Reunion =

Book on the United States civil war in popular memory

Race and Reunion: The Civil War in American Memory
- Author: David W. Blight
- Language: English
- Publisher: Belknap Press
- Publication date: 2001
- Publication place: United States
- Media type: Print
- Pages: 512
- Awards: Ellis W. Hawley Prize; Frederick Douglass Prize; Lincoln Prize; Merle Curti Award; James A. Rawley Prize (OAH)
- ISBN: 978-0-674-00332-3
- Dewey Decimal: 973.7
- LC Class: E468.9 .B58 2001

Race and Reunion: The Civil War in American Memory is a 2001 book by the American historian David W. Blight. The book was awarded the Frederick Douglass Prize for the best book on slavery of 2001.

== Content ==
The book looks at the aftermath of the Civil War and argues that sectional division was lessened and reconciliation achieved at the expense of memory of slavery and the continuing effects of racial prejudice and discrimination on the United States. Blight investigates how the Civil War was reimagined, with white soldiers on both sides sharing common valor and glory of military campaign, eliding the destruction of slavery from its central role as the integral cause of the war. He describes the way Lost Cause, states rights, and the Old South myths were promoted by Southerners in literature and popular culture. These ideas were influential for decades, and published in textbooks, histories and other works.

== Reception ==
Blight's work was widely praised by other scholars. István Vida writes, "It is justified to call Professor Blight a pioneer of this field [of memory studies], and his Race and Reunion offers the most comprehensive study of the War...rel[ying] on a stupendous variety of primary sources." In Rhetoric & Public Affairs, Wilbur C. Rich writes, "Blight's book exposes the misinformation, puffery, and distortions that characterized Southern memories and history."

In awarding Blight the $25,000 Frederick Douglass Prize, the award's sponsors said:

“Blight’s book is not only good history, it is superb writing. The masterful and engaging style of Race and Reunion makes it extraordinarily appealing to a broad audience. That is important, because few Americans have a clear understanding of the impact of slavery in our nation’s history. This book will be read, and it will make a difference.”
