= Roy Lubove =

- Born: September 3, 1934; Jackson Heights, Queens
- Died: February 17, 1995 (aged 60); Pittsburgh, Pennsylvania

Academic background
- Education: Columbia University (BA); Cornell University (PhD)
- Doctoral advisor: David Brion Davis

Academic work
- Discipline: Social history
- Institutions: Harvard University; University of Pittsburgh

Roy Lubove (September 3, 1934 – February 17, 1995) was an American social historian. He was professor of social welfare and history at the University of Pittsburgh and the author of a number of social histories.

== Biography ==
Lubove was born in Jackson Heights, Queens on September 3, 1934, to a family of Polish immigrants. He matriculated at the Bronx High School of Science and earned his bachelor's degree from Columbia College in 1956. He earned his doctorate from Cornell University in 1960 under historian David Brion Davis, and joined the faculty of Harvard University that year. His childhood experience living in densely developed Jackson Heights influenced his lifelong interest in studying the structure of neighborhoods, urban planning, and landscape design, and his upbringing during the Great Depression inspired him to study poverty and social welfare.

In 1963, Lubove joined the faculty of the University of Pittsburgh. He was a professor of history and social studies with dual appointments in the university's departments of social work and history. Lubove was the author of a number of influential and widely cited social histories, including The Struggle for Social Security, 1900-1935 (1968), The Professional Altruist: The Emergence of Social Work as a Career, 1880-1930 (1968), and Twentieth Century Pittsburgh, Vol. 1: Government, Business and Change (1969). He was credited for a number of scholarly contributions to the study of urban, social welfare, and planning history, such as by proposing a new conceptual framework for urban history, one that emphasized decision-making, social organization, and urban change, and provided what Raymond A. Mohl calls "one of the best historical case studies of urban response to deindustrialization" in his book Twentieth Century Pittsburgh, Vol. 2: The Post-Steel Era (1995).

Lubove was a founding director of Preservation Pittsburgh and was a longtime advocate of preserving Pittsburgh's historical cityscape.

Lubove died of respiratory failure on February 17, 1995, at the Montefiore Hospital, Pittsburgh.
