= Arlette Jouanna =

French historian and academic (1936–2022)

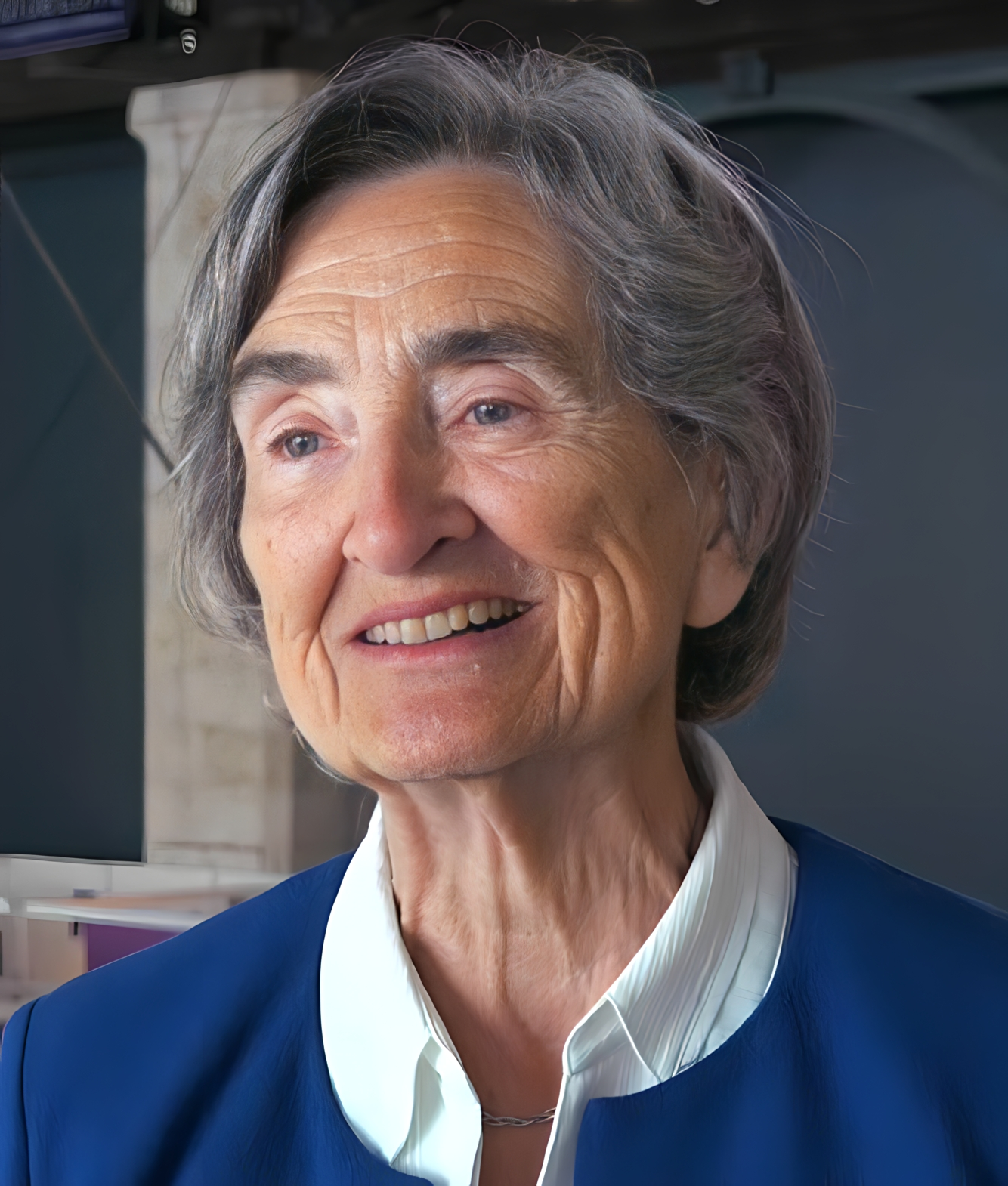
Arlette Jouanna

Arlette Jouanna (24 March 1936 – 29 January 2022) was a French historian and academic. She was professor emerita at l’Université Paul-Valéry (Montpellier III). She was a member of the Centre de recherches interdisciplinaires en sciences humaines et sociales (CRISES). She specialised in the political and social history of sixteenth-century France, especially the history of the nobility and the French Wars of Religion.

== Life and career ==
Jouanna was a pupil at the École normale supérieure de jeunes filles (Sèvres). She completed a degree in history in 1968 at the Sorbonne (Paris IV) where she was taught by Roland Mousnier. She was awarded her PhD in 1975 for a thesis entitled 'L'idée de race en France au XVIe siècle et au début du XVIIe'. For her entire career she taught at l'Université Paul Valéry (Montpellier III).

== Death ==
Jouanna died on 29 January 2022, at the age of 85.

== Awards, honours, prizes ==
- In 2008 she won the Prix François Guizot for her book La Saint-Barthélemy. Les mystères d'un crime d'Etat (The St Bartholomew's Massacre: The Mysteries of a Crime of State) (Paris, Gallimard, 2007), awarded by the Conseil général du Calvados.
- In 2013 she was awarded the Prix Chateaubriand for her book Le Pouvoir absolu : naissance de l'imaginaire politique de la royauté (Absolute Power: the Birth of the Royal Political Imaginary).
- In 2014 she was awarded the J. Russell Major Prize, an annual prize given to a historian by the American Historical Association, for her translated book The St Bartholomew’s Day Massacre: The Mysteries of a Crime of State. The prize is awarded annually for the best work in English on any aspect of French history.
- In 2018 the Prix littéraire Montaigne de Bordeaux awarded her a Special Prize for her biography of Michel de Montaigne, Montaigne (Paris, Éditions Gallimard, 2017).

== Selected publications ==
- Le devoir de révolte. La noblesse française et la gestation de l'État moderne: 1559–1661. Fayard, 1989
- La Saint-Barthélemy. Les mystères d'un crime d'Etat. Gallimard, 2007
- Le pouvoir absolu : naissance de l'imaginaire politique de la royauté. Gallimard, 2013
- Bartholomew’s Day Massacre: The Mysteries of a Crime of State (trans. Joseph Bergin). Manchester University Press, 2013
- Montaigne. Gallimard, 2017
