= The Slave's Cause =

2016 book by Manisha Sinha

The Slave's Cause: A History of Abolition
- Author: Manisha Sinha
- Language: English
- Subject: History
- Publication place: United States
- Media type: Hardcover, Paperback
- ISBN: 978-0-300-18137-1

The Slave's Cause: A History of Abolition is a history book by Manisha Sinha that was released in February 2016 by Yale University Press.

Writing in The Atlantic, Adam Rothman calls The Slave's Cause "a stunning new history of abolitionism."
