= Amy Murrell Taylor =

American historian

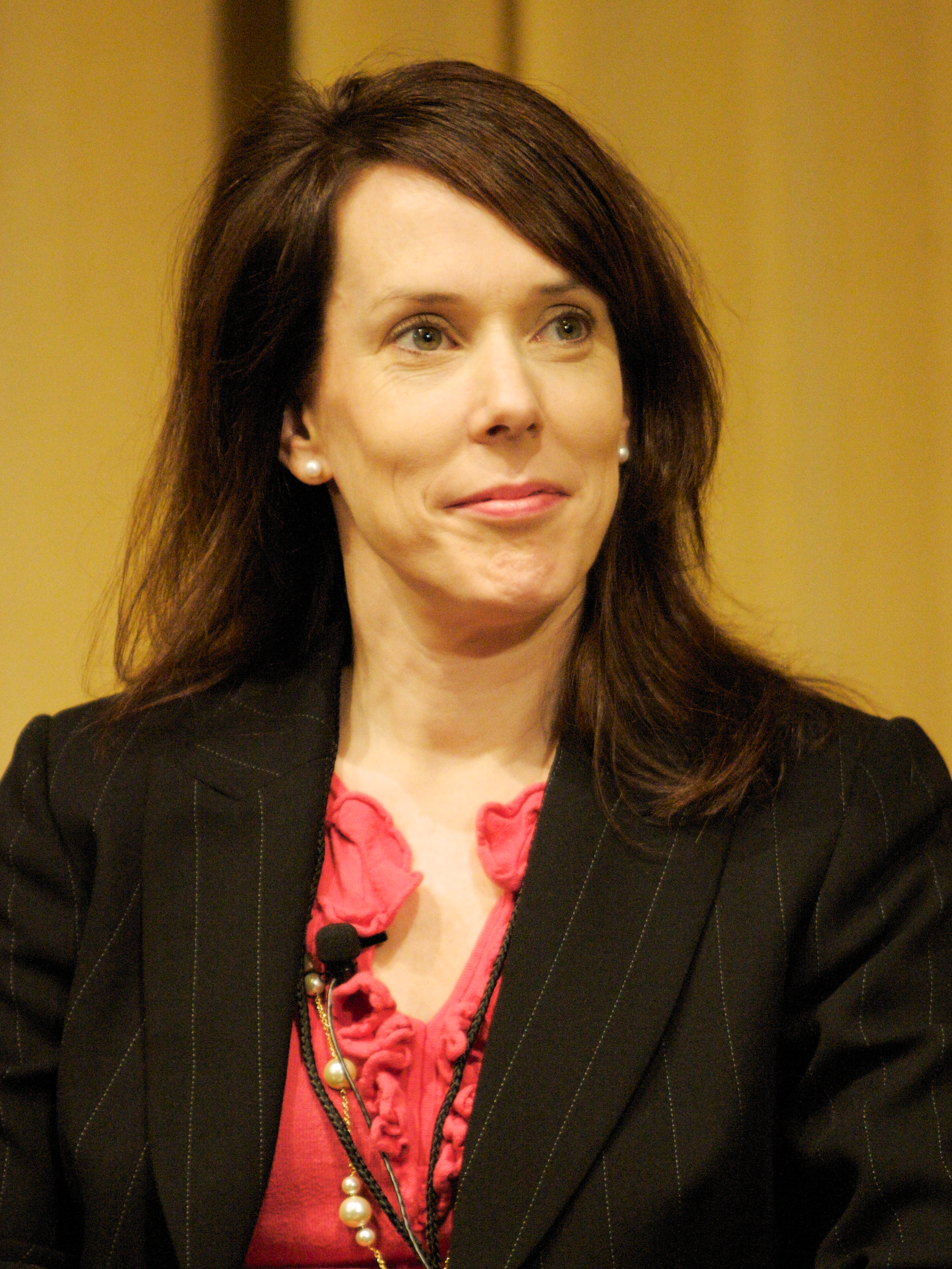
- Taylor in 2010
- Awards: Merle Curti Award; Frederick Douglass Prize

Academic background
- Education: B.A., Duke University; M.A., PhD, history, 2001, University of Virginia
- Thesis: The Divided Family in Civil War America, 1860–1870 (2001)

Amy Elizabeth Murrell Taylor is an American historian. She is the T. Marshall Hahn Jr. Professor of History at the University of Kentucky.

== Early life and education ==
Taylor earned her Bachelor of Arts from Duke University, then earned her master's degree and PhD from the University of Virginia. Her thesis was titled The Divided Family in Civil War America, 1860–1870.

== Career ==
Taylor joined the Department of History at University at Albany, SUNY as an assistant professor. While there, she published her first book titled The Divided Family in Civil War America in 2005. Using personal experiences from the Civil War Era, including letters, diaries, newspapers, and government documents, Taylor examines how the war divided nations and families. Following her publication, Taylor received the 2007 College of Arts and Sciences Dean's Award for Outstanding Achievement in Teaching and was granted a 2008 Fellowship with the American Council of Learned Societies. Her fellowship focused on her project An Army of Fugitives: A History of the Men, Women, and Children Who Fled Slavery During the United States Civil War. Before leaving Albany for a similar position at the University of Kentucky, Taylor was appointed to the Board of Advisors of The Society of Civil War Historians.

In 2012, Taylor left Albany for a tenured associate professor position at the University of Kentucky's Department of History. While continuing to work on her project An Army of Fugitives: A History of the Men, Women, and Children Who Fled Slavery During the United States Civil War, she was appointed to the editorial board for the Journal of Southern History and to the selection committee for the 2016 Avery Craven Prize. Two years later, she was promoted to interim chair of UK's Department of History and published her book Embattled Freedom: Journeys through the Civil War's Slave Refugee Camps. The book focused on the everyday life experiences of escapes slaves seeking refuge during the Civil War. ''Embattled Freedom received numerous awards including the 2019 Frederick Douglass Prize, Nau Book Prize, Tom Watson Brown Book Prize, and Merle Curti Award.

On June 19, 2020, it was announced that Taylor would be appointed as University Research Professor for the 2020-21 Academic year at the University of Kentucky.

== Publications ==
- The Divided Family in Civil War America, 2005
- Embattled Freedom: Journeys through the Civil War's Slave Refugee Camps, 2018
