= David Henige =

American historian and Africanist scholar

- Occupations: Historian; librarian
- Known for: African history and historical bibliography

David Patrick Henige (born March 26, 1938) is an American historian, bibliographer, academic librarian and Africanist scholar. The majority of Henige's academic career has been spent in affiliation with the University of Wisconsin–Madison, where for over three decades he held the position of bibliographer in African studies at UW–Madison's Memorial Library.

== Education ==
As an undergraduate, Henige attended the University of Toledo, Ohio in the 1960s, obtaining first a B.A. then a master's degree in history. In 1973 he completed a PhD in African History at the University of Wisconsin-Madison. Henige undertook fieldwork towards his degree in Ghana, West Africa. Henige's long association with the Memorial Library began during his PhD studies, when he worked for the library.

== Career ==
After completing his PhD, Henige taught for a year at the University of Birmingham's Centre of West African Studies, a research department established a decade earlier by the noted Africanist scholar John D. Fage.

Preferring the autonomy of a bibliographer to lecturing, Henige returned to Wisconsin in 1974 to take a position at the Memorial Library. He thereafter completed a master's degree in Library and information science in 1978. Henige was the founder and editor of the journal History in Africa from 1974 to 2010.

Henige has written several books and more than 170 scholarly papers in his major fields of interest, African studies and history, as well as substantial contributions to historiography, librarianship, epistemology, the nature of oral history and myth, and critiques of historical methodologies.
