= Manisha Sinha =

Indian-born American historian

- Parent: Srinivas Kumar Sinha

Academic background
- Education: Columbia University

Academic work
- Discipline: History
- Sub-discipline: Reconstruction
- Institutions: University of Massachusetts, Amherst; University of Connecticut

Manisha Sinha is an Indian-born American historian, and the James L. and Shirley A. Draper Chair in American History at the University of Connecticut. She is the author of The Slave's Cause: A History of Abolition (2016) and The Rise and Fall of the Second American Republic: Reconstruction, 1860-1920 (2024).

== Life and career ==
Her father was Srinivas Kumar Sinha, an Indian Army general. She received her PhD from Columbia University.

Sinha's research focuses on early United States history, especially the transnational histories of slavery and abolition and the history of the Civil War and Reconstruction. Sinha is the author of The Counterrevolution of Slavery: Politics and Ideology in Antebellum South Carolina (2000), which was named one of the ten best books on slavery in Politico in 2015, and The Slave's Cause: A History of Abolition (2016), which won the Frederick Douglass Book Prize, the Avery O. Craven Award for Best Book on the Civil War Era, the Society for Historians of the Early American Republic's Best Book Prize, the James A. Rawley Award for the Best Book on Secession and the Sectional Crisis, and was long-listed for the National Book Award for Nonfiction. In 2024, Sinha published her most recent book, The Rise and Fall of the Second American Republic: Reconstruction, 1860-1920.

Sinha is also a contributing author of The Abolitionist Imagination (Harvard University Press, 2012) and co-editor of African American Mosaic: A Documentary History from the African Slave Trade to the Twenty-First Century (Prentice Hall, 2 vols., 2004) and Contested Democracy: Freedom, Race, and Power in American History (Columbia University Press, 2007).

At the University of Massachusetts, Amherst, where she taught for over twenty years, she was awarded the Chancellor's Medal, the highest honor bestowed on faculty, and received the Distinguished Graduate Mentor Award in Recognition of Outstanding Graduate Teaching and Advising. She was elected member of the American Antiquarian Society, was appointed to the Organization of American Historians' Distinguished Lecture Series, and is President of the Society for Historians of the Early American Republic.

Sinha has received two year-long research fellowships from the National Endowment for the Humanities, fellowships from the Charles Warren Center and the W.E.B. Du Bois Institute at Harvard University, the Howard Foundation fellowship at Brown University, and the Rockefeller Post-Doctoral fellowship from the Institute of the Arts and Humanities at the University of North Carolina, Chapel Hill. In 2022, she was awarded a Guggenheim Fellowship.

In 2018, Sinha was a Visiting Professor at the University of Paris Diderot (now Paris Cité University). In the summer of 2021, she was a Visiting Professor at the Heidelberg Center for American Studies at the University of Heidelberg.

She is a member of the Historian Advisory Council of the American Civil War Museum, Richmond, and of the Council of Advisors of the Lapidus Center for the Historical Analysis of Transatlantic Slavery at the Schomburg Center for Research in Black Culture of the New York Public Library. She is on the Council of the American Antiquarian Society, the Historian Advisory Council of the American Civil War Museum, and the Board of Trustees of the Connecticut Museum of Culture and History. She was co-editor of the "Race in the Atlantic World" series of the University of Georgia Press and is on the editorial board of the Slavery & Abolition journal.

She lives in Massachusetts with her family.

== Books ==
- The Counterrevolution of Slavery: Politics and Ideology in Antebellum South Carolina, University of North Carolina Press, 2000. ISBN 9780807825716, OCLC 469742367
- Contested Democracy: Freedom, Race, and Power in American History, 2007. Edited by Manisha Sinha and Penny Von Eschen. Columbia University Press. ISBN 978-0231141109
- The Slave's Cause: A History of Abolition, New Haven: Yale University Press, 2016. ISBN 9780300181371, OCLC 1039313848
- The Rise and Fall of the Second American Republic: Reconstruction, 1860-1920, Liveright, 2024. ISBN 9781631498442, OCLC 1379265882

== Articles and essays ==
- "A Prophet and a Warrior: The Religious Roots of a Famous Slave Revolt," Times Literary Supplement, January 10, 2025
- "The Second Abolition," The Nation, November 19, 2024
- "As an American Historian, I Urge All My Countrymen to Vote for the First Desi President," American Kahani, September 1, 2024
- "How the Supreme Court got things so wrong on the Trump ruling," CNN March 4, 2024
- "What Made Early America?" William and Mary Quarterly 81 (January 2024): 65-72
- "The Beautiful Struggle," The New York Review of Books, April 20, 2023
- "Why I Hope 2022 will be another 1866," CNN October 12, 2022
- "The Perils of Public Engagement," Modern American History, July 2022
- "The Case for a Third Reconstruction," The New York Review of Books, February 3, 2021
- "What this 18th Century Poet Reveals About Amanda Gorman's Success," CNN February 1, 2021
- "Why Kamala Harris Matters to Me," The New York Times, August 12, 2020
- "The 2020 Election Surpasses all Before It, Except One," CNN, October 28, 2020
- "Donald Trump, Meet Your Precursor," The New York Times, November 29, 2019
- "The Long History of American Slavery Reparations," The Wall Street Journal, September 20, 2019
- "The New Fugitive Slave Laws," The New York Review of Books, July 17, 2019
- "The Problem of Abolition in the Age of Capitalism," American Historical Review, 124 (February 2019): 144-163

== Awards, honors and fellowships ==
- John W. Blassingame Award for Distinguished Scholarship and Mentorship in African American History, Southern Historical Association, 2024
- John Simon Guggenheim Memorial Foundation Fellowship in the Humanities, US and Canada, 2022–2023
- James W.C. Pennington Award, University of Heidelberg, Germany, 2021
- Mellon Distinguished Scholar-in-Residence, American Antiquarian Society, Worcester 2020–2021
- Kidger Award for excellence in teaching, research and writing, and service to the profession, New England History Teachers' Association, 2018
- Top 25 Women in Higher Education and Beyond, Diverse: Issues in Higher Education, March 9, 2017
- National Endowment for the Humanities Fellowship, Massachusetts Historical Society, 2016–2017
- Distinguished Graduate Mentor Award in Recognition of Outstanding Graduate Teaching and Advising, University of Massachusetts, Amherst, 2016
- Exceptional Merit Award, University of Massachusetts, Amherst, 2013
- Chancellor's Medal and Distinguished Faculty Lecture, University of Massachusetts, Amherst, 2011
- Howard Foundation Fellowship, Brown University, 2009–2010
- Faculty Fellowship, Charles Warren Center for Studies in American History, Harvard University, 2007–2008
- Elected Member, American Antiquarian Society, Worcester, 2006-
- National Endowment for the Humanities Fellowship, American Antiquarian Society, Worcester, 2004–2005
- Appointed to Distinguished Lecture Series, Organization of American Historians, 2003-
