= David Brion Davis =

American intellectual and cultural historian (1927–2019)

- Born: February 16, 1927; Denver, Colorado, U.S.
- Died: April 14, 2019 (aged 92); Guilford, Connecticut, U.S.
- Spouse: Toni Hahn Davis (m. 1971)
- Parents: Clyde Brion Davis; Martha Elizabeth Wirt
- Awards: Pulitzer Prize for General Nonfiction (1967); National Humanities Medal (2014)

Academic background
- Education: Dartmouth College (AB); Harvard University (PhD)

Academic work
- Discipline: American History
- Institutions: Cornell University; Yale University
- Doctoral students: Sean Wilentz
- Notable works: The Problem of Slavery in Western Culture (1966); Inhuman Bondage: The Rise and Fall of Slavery in the New World (2006)

David Brion Davis (February 16, 1927 – April 14, 2019) was an American intellectual and cultural historian, and a leading authority on slavery and abolition in the Western world. He was a Sterling Professor of History at Yale University, and founder and director of Yale's Gilder Lehrman Center for the Study of Slavery, Resistance, and Abolition. He was a self-described "leftish Democrat."

Davis authored or edited 17 books. His books emphasize religious and ideological links among material conditions, political interests, and new political values. Ideology, in his view, is not a deliberate distortion of reality or a façade for material interests; rather, it is the conceptual lens through which groups of people perceive the world around them. He was also a frequent contributor to The New York Review of Books.

Davis received the 1967 Pulitzer Prize for General Nonfiction, and the National Humanities Medal, presented by President Barack Obama in 2014 for "reshaping our understanding of history". He also received the 2015 National Book Critics Circle Award for General Nonfiction, the 2015 Anisfield-Wolf Book Award for lifetime achievement in contributions to public understanding of racism and appreciation of cultural diversity, and the 2015 Biennial Coif Book Award, a top honor from the Association of American Law Schools for the leading law-related book published in 2013 and 2014.

After serving on the Cornell University faculty for 14 years, Davis taught at Yale from 1970 to 2001. He held one-year appointments as the Harold Vyvyan Harmsworth Visiting Professor of American History at Oxford University (1969–1970), at the Center for Advanced Study in the Behavioral Sciences at Stanford University, and as the first French-American Foundation Chair in American Civilization at the École des Hautes Études en Sciences Sociales in Paris.

== Early life ==
Born in Denver in 1927, the son of Clyde Brion Davis, a journalist, novelist, and screenwriter, and Martha Elizabeth (Wirt) Davis, an artist and writer, Davis lived a peripatetic childhood in California, Colorado, New York, Colorado, and Washington State. He attended five high schools in four years but was popular among his peers. In 1950, he earned a B.A. in philosophy from Dartmouth College, then earned his PhD at Harvard University in 1956.

During World War II, Davis was drafted into the United States Army in June 1945. On the troop ship to France in fall 1945, he witnessed the segregation and mistreatment of black soldiers. He was assigned to the occupation of Germany in 1945–46. Since he knew some German, Davis was assigned to police civilians. Davis, whose parents "both rebelled against their Christian upbringing", did not identify with any religion until he married Toni Hahn Davis, who is Jewish. In 1987, Davis began his conversion to Judaism and had a Bar Mitzvah in 2008.

== Work ==
In an essay in the 1968 American Historical Review entitled "Some Recent Directions in American Cultural History", Davis urged historians to devote more attention to the cultural dimension to enhance understanding of social controversies, political decision-making, and literary expression. At a time when social history was ascendant, and cultural history was associated with the study of the arts, taste, and popular culture, and intellectual history with the study of abstract ideas largely divorced from specific social contexts, he called for a history that focused on beliefs, values, fears, aspirations, and emotions.

Antebellum American Culture (1979), his panoramic look at the cultural discourse surrounding ethnicity, gender, family, race, science, and wealth and power in the pre-Civil War United States, advanced the argument that American culture needs to be understood in terms of an ongoing "moral civil war". Diverse groups of Americans debated "what was happening, who was doing what to whom, what to fear and what to fight for." He suggests that a relatively small group of Northeastern writers, preachers, and reformers in the 19th century United States ultimately succeeded in defining a set of middle-class norms regarding education, taste, sex roles, sensibility, and moral respectability.

=== Study of slavery ===
University of Maryland historian Ira Berlin wrote that "no scholar has played a larger role in expanding contemporary understanding of how slavery shaped the history of the United States, the Americas, and the world than David Brion Davis." In a series of landmark books, articles, and lectures, Davis moved beyond a view of slavery that focuses on the institution in individual nations to look at the "big picture", the multinational view of the origins, development, and abolition of New World slavery. The most important of his books is his trilogy on the history of slavery in the Western world, which revealed the centrality of slavery in American and Atlantic history. The trilogy consisted of the Pulitzer Prize-winning The Problem of Slavery in Western Culture (1966), The Problem of Slavery in the Age of Revolution, 1770–1823 (1975), and The Problem of Slavery in the Age of Emancipation, (2014). He was committed to a conception of culture as process—a process involving conflict, resistance, invention, accommodation, appropriation, and, above all, power, including the power of ideas. Culture, in his view, involves a cacophony of voices but also social relations that involve hierarchy, exploitation, and resistance.

== Students ==
Davis taught more than a generation of students, and advised many doctoral students, including such future prize-winning historians as Edward Ayers, Karen Halttunen, T. J. Jackson Lears, Steven Mintz, Lewis Perry, Joan Shelley Rubin, Jonathan Sarna, Barbara Savage, Amy Dru Stanley, Christine Stansell, John Stauffer, Sean Wilentz, and Roy Lubove. Davis's students have honored him with two festschrifts, Moral Problems in American Life (1998), edited by Karen Halttunen and Lewis Perry, and The Problem of Evil: Slavery, Freedom, and the Ambiguities of Reform (2007), edited by Steven Mintz and John Stauffer.

== Career summary ==
=== Appointments ===
- Instructor, Dartmouth College, 1953–1954
- Assistant Professor, Cornell University, 1955–1958
- Associate Professor, Cornell University, 1958–1963
- Ernest I. White Professor of History, Cornell University, 1963–1969
- Farnam Professor of History, Yale University, 1969–1978
- Sterling Professor of History, Yale University, 1978–2001
- Director, Gilder Lehrman Center for the Study of Slavery, Resistance, and Abolition, Yale University, 1998–2004

=== Awards ===
- Anisfield-Wolf Award, 1967
- Pulitzer Prize for General Nonfiction, 1967 (The Problem of Slavery in Western Culture)
- Mass Media Award, National Conference of Christians and Jews, 1967
- American Historical Association Albert J. Beveridge Award, 1975
- Bancroft Prize, 1976
- National Book Award in History and Biography, 1976 (The Problem of Slavery in the Age of Revolution)
- Presidential Medal, Dartmouth College, 1991
- Society of American Historians Bruce Catton Prize for Lifetime Achievement, 2004
- Kidger Award for Improving the Teaching of History, 2004
- Association of American Publishers Best Book in History Award 2006
- American Historical Association Scholarly Achievement Award, 2007
- Connecticut Book Award for Nonfiction, 2007
- Phi Beta Kappa Society Ralph Waldo Emerson Award, 2007
- Harvard University Centennial Medal of the Graduate School of Arts and Sciences, 2009
- Association of American Publishers Excellence Award, 2010
- Yale University Phi Beta Kappa DeVane Teaching Award 2011
- National Humanities Medal, presented by President Barack Obama at the White House ceremony in 2014
- National Book Critics Circle Award winner for The Problem of Slavery in the Age of Emancipation, 2015
- Anisfield-Wolf Book Award for Lifetime Achievement, 2015
- Gilder Lehrman Institute of American History Award for Lifetime Achievement, 2015
- Biennial Coif Book Award, Association of American Law Schools, 2015
- 2016, Honorary Doctorate, Harvard University (awarded in Cambridge, Massachusetts, on May 26, 2016).

=== Fellowships ===
- Guggenheim Fellow, 1958–1959
- Center for Advanced Study in the Behavioral Sciences, 1972–1973
- Fulbright grantee, 1980
- NEH fellow, 1983–1984
- Gilder-Lehrman Inaugural Fellow, 1996–1997

=== Honors ===
- Fulbright Senior Lecturer, American Studies Research Centre, Hyderabad, India, 1967
- Harmsworth Professor, Oxford University, 1969–1970
- French-American Foundation Chair in American Civilization, École des Hautes Études en Sciences Sociales, 1980–1981
- Fulbright Lecturer, University of Guyana and University of the West Indies, 1974
- Honorary Degree, Dartmouth College, 1977
- Honorary Degree, University of New Haven, 1986
- President, Organization of American Historians, 1988–1989
- Presidential Medal for Leadership and Achievement, Dartmouth College, 1991
- Honorary Degree, Columbia University, 1999
- Honorary Degree, Harvard University, 2016
- Fellow, American Academy of Arts and Sciences
- Fellow, American Antiquarian Society
- Fellow, American Philosophical Society
- Fellow (corr.), British Academy

== Publications ==
- Homicide in American Fiction, 1798–1860: A Study in Social Values, Cornell University Press, 1957; paperback ed., 1968.
- The Problem of Slavery in Western Culture, Cornell University Press, 1966. 1967 Pulitzer Prize for General Nonfiction. History Book Club selection, 1967, paperback ed., 1969; Penguin British ed., 1970; Spanish and Italian translations; Oxford University Press, revised ed., 1988. A new Spanish edition appeared in 1996 and a Brazilian Portuguese edition in 2001. online edition from ACLS E-Books
- Ante-Bellum Reform (editor), Harper and Row, 1967.
- The Slave Power Conspiracy and the Paranoid Style, Louisiana State University Press, 1969. Paperback ed., 1982.
- Was Thomas Jefferson an Authentic Enemy of Slavery? (pamphlet), Oxford, Clarendon Press, 1970.
- The Fear of Conspiracy: Images of Un-American Subversion from the Revolution to the Present (editor). Cornell University Press, 1971; paperback ed., 1972.
- The Problem of Slavery in the Age of Revolution, 1770–1823, Cornell University Press, 1975; paperback ed., 1976. History Book Club and Book-of-the-Month Club alternate selections. Oxford University Press edition, with a new preface, 1999.
- The Great Republic, "Part III, Expanding the Republic, 1820–1860," a two-volume textbook by Bernard Bailyn and five other historians; D.C. Heath, textbook, 1977. History Book Club selection, 1977. Second ed., wholly revised, 1981. Third ed., wholly revised, 1985. Fourth ed., wholly revised, 1992.
- Antebellum American Culture: An Interpretive Anthology, Antebellum American Culture: An Interpretive Anthology, D.C. Heath, 1979; new edition, Pennsylvania State Press, 1997.
- Slavery and the Idea of Progress (address to the Center for the Study of Southern Culture and Religion, February 28, 1979) read online
- The Emancipation Moment (pamphlet), Gettysburg College, 1984.
- Slavery and Human Progress, Oxford University Press, 1984. History Book Club alternate selection. Paperback ed., 1986.
- Slavery in the Colonial Chesapeake (pamphlet), Colonial Williamsburg Foundation, 1986.
- From Homicide to Slavery: Studies in American Culture, Oxford University Press, 1986.
- Revolutions: Reflections on American Equality and Foreign Liberations, Harvard University Press, 1990. German translation, 1993.
- Co-author, The Antislavery Debate: Capitalism and Abolitionism as a Problem in Historical Interpretation, ed. Thomas Bender. University of California Press, Berkeley, 1992.
- The Boisterous Sea of Liberty: A Documentary History of America from Discovery Through the Civil War, co-editor Steven Mintz, Oxford University Press, 1998.
- In the Image of God: Religion, Moral Values, and Our Heritage of Slavery, Yale University Press, 2001.
- Challenging The Boundaries Of Slavery, Harvard University Press, 2003.
- Inhuman Bondage: The Rise and Fall of Slavery in the New World, Oxford University Press, 2006
- The Problem of Slavery in the Age of Emancipation, Alfred A. Knopf, 2014.
- "The Problem of Slavery", Introduction to A Historical Guide to World Slavery, ed. Drescher and Engerman, Oxford University Press 1998; read online
