= Robert Harms (historian) =

American historian

Robert W. Harms (born February 10, 1946) is an American historian and Henry J. Heinz Professor of History & African Studies at Yale University. He is a winner of the J. Russell Major Prize.

== Books ==
- Land of Tears: The Exploration and Exploitation of Equatorial Africa, New York: Basic Books, 2019
- The Diligent: A Voyage Through the Worlds of the Slave Trade, New York: Basic Books, 2002
- Games Against Nature: An EcoCultural History of the Nunu of Equatorial Africa, New York: Cambridge University Press, 1987 (Second edition, 1999)
- River of Wealth, River of Sorrow: The Central Zaire Basin in the Era of the Slave and Ivory Trade, 1500-1891, New Haven: Yale University Press, 1981
- Paths Toward the Past: African Historical Essays in Honor of Jan Vansina, CoEditor with Joseph C. Miller, Michele D. Wagner, and David S. Newbury, Atlanta: African Studies Association Press, 1994

== See also ==
- Jan Vansina
