= Never Caught =

2017 non-fiction book on slavery by Erica Armstrong Dunbar

Never Caught: The Washingtons' Relentless Pursuit of Their Runaway Slave, Ona Judge is a non-fiction book by American historian Erica Armstrong Dunbar, published in 2017. The book chronicles the life of Ona Judge, an enslaved woman owned by George and Martha Washington, and her escape from the President's household in Philadelphia, the capitol of the newly-formed United States, in 1796.

== Summary ==
The beginning of the book depicts Ona Judge and her life as a slave in the household of George and Martha Washington. This includes information about the daily life of enslaved people, including backbreaking labor, cruel punishments, and the constant threat of being sold to another plantation. Dunbar also details the unique challenges that Judge faced as a slave in the Washingtons' household, including the pressure to conform to the expectations of her powerful and demanding owners.

The next section of the book focuses on Judge’s escape and the Washingtons' relentless pursuit of her. Dunbar describes the network of allies that Ona relied on to make her escape, as well as the extensive efforts that the Washingtons made to try and recapture her. The book describes the brutal realities of slavery in the United States during the late 18th century. It also details the lengths to which the Washingtons went to try and recover their "property," including using the power of the fledgling federal government and of state government, their extensive network of contacts, newspaper advertisements, and threats of legal action.

Dunbar also explores the broader historical context of slavery in the United States, including the Fugitive Slave Act and the legal and social systems that supported slavery.

Despite the Washingtons’ efforts, Ona Judge managed to evade capture and lived the rest of her life as a fugitive slave in New Hampshire, where she married and had children. The Washingtons never stopped searching for Ona Judge.

== Critical reception ==
David N. Gellman said in the Journal of Southern History, “The book aims for a popular audience. Points of contention are confined to the citations, and overt academic theorizing is avoided. The author does not stake out explicit positions on the ever-growing historiographical debates on slavery, the Revolution, the founders, and the Constitution; she also does not attempt a comprehensive assessment of Washington and slavery, either in comparison with other founders or on Washington's own terms.”

Meanwhile, Shana L. Haines wrote in an online review that Ona Judge, a “woman whose safety and freedom in eighteenth-century America depended upon remaining hidden”, had “finally given prominence in her own story rather than as aside to the Washingtons”.

Matt Damsker, from USA Today, commented: “The Ona Judge saga is a well-known matter of human bondage and presidential history, but Dunbar’s book is touted as the first full-length account of Judge’s life. Even for those who know the basics, Never Caught is a crisp and compulsively readable feat of research and storytelling.”

Kirkus Reviews had a comment on the book: “A startling, well-researched slave narrative that seriously questions the intentions of our first president.”

== Awards ==
Finalist, National Book Awards, 2017.

== Editions ==
- Never Caught, the Washingtons' Relentless Pursuit of Their Runaway Slave, Ona Judge, 2017
- Never Caught, the Story of Ona Judge, George and Martha Washington’s Courageous Slave Who Dared to Run Away, Young Readers Edition, 2019
