= David Newbury =

American historian (born 1942)

- Born: 1942 (age 83–84)
- Scientific career
- Thesis: Kings and clans on Ijwi Island (Zaire), c. 1780–1840 (1979)
- Doctoral advisor: Jan Vansina

David Starr Newbury (born 1942) is the Gwendolen Carter professor of African studies at Smith College, Massachusetts. He received his PhD from the University of Wisconsin–Madison in 1979 for thesis titled Kings and clans on Ijwi Island (Zaire), c. 1780–1840 under the supervision of Jan Vansina. His academic work has three major foci within East and Central Africa. The first was pre-colonial societal transformation in the Kivu Rift Valley. The second was how a Rwandan famine in the late 1920s reinforced colonial rule. The final major focus was the transformation of a hunter-gatherer society in the eastern Democratic Republic of the Congo into an agricultural economy. His recent work has included studies of the historical roots of Central African violence in the late 1990s to present. René Lemarchand states, "No attempt to grasp the historical context of genocide [in Rwanda] can ignore Catherine [sic] and David Newbury’s seminal contributions."

Newbury is the chair of the Five College African Studies Council, is a member of the Program Committee of the 2009 Annual Meeting of the American Historical Association (AHA) and is member of the AHA Nominating Committee. The chair of the Graduate Student Award Committee of the African Studies Association (ASA), he also co-edits, with Catharine Newbury, the Book Review of the African Studies Review, the ASA academic journal.

== Publications ==
- Vers le Passé du Zaire: quelques methodes de recherche historique (in French). Institut pour la recherche scientifique en Afrique centrale. 1973.
- Kamo and Lubambo: dual genesis traditions on Ijwi Island (Zaïre). Centre d'étude et de documentation africaines. 1979.
- Jewsiewicki, Bogumil, ed. (1985). African Historiographies: What History for Which Africa?. Sage Publications. ISBN 978-0-8039-2498-7.
- Kings and Clans: A Social History of the Lake Kivu Rift Valley. University of Wisconsin Press. 1992. ISBN 978-0-299-12894-4.
- Harms, Robert W.; Miller, Joseph C.; Wagner, Michele D. (1996). Paths to the Past: Essays in Honor of Jan Vansina.
- The Land Beyond the Mists: Essays on Identity and Authority in Precolonial Congo and Rwanda. Ohio University Press. 2009. ISBN 978-0-8214-1875-8.
