= Debora L. Silverman =

American art historian

Debora Leah Silverman is professor and University of California Presidential Chair in Modern European History, Art and Culture at the University of California, Los Angeles. She received her PhD from Princeton University in 1983. She is a specialist in the history of Art Nouveau. She was a Guggenheim fellow in 1992 in fine arts research.

Silverman is the author of Art Nouveau in Fin-de-Siècle France: Politics, Psychology, and Style (1989) which was a co-winner of the Berkshire History prize, and Van Gogh and Gauguin: The Search for Sacred Art (2001) which was awarded a Ralph Waldo Emerson National Prize for Best Book in the Humanities and a PEN American Center Architectural Digest Prize for "outstanding writing on the visual arts." She was awarded a fellowship from New York Public Library for 2015–16.

== Selected publications ==
- "Sigmund Freud and Jean-Martin Charcot: Liberal Legacies and the Scope of Psychological Innovations" in Vienna, 1880-1930, L'Apocalypse Joyeuse, Centre Pompidou, Paris, 1986.
- Selling Culture, Pantheon, 1986.
- Art Nouveau in Fin-de-Siecle France: Politics, Psychology and Style, University of California Press, 1989.
- Amerika hält hof, Rowohlt, 1990.
- "The New Woman, Modernism and the Decorative Arts in Fin-de-Siecle France," in Lynn Hunt, ed., Eroticism and the Body Politic in Modern France, 1990.
- "Pilgrim's Progress and Vincent Van Gogh's Metier," in M. Bailey, ed., Van Gogh in England, 1992.
- "Religious and Social Origins of Van Gogh's Craft Labor," in M. Roth, ed., Rediscovering History, 1994.
- Van Gogh and Gauguin: The Search for Sacred Art, Farrar, Straus & Gireux, 2000
