= Ashley's sack =

Mid-1800s cloth sack with embroidered account of the slave sale of a nine-year-old girl

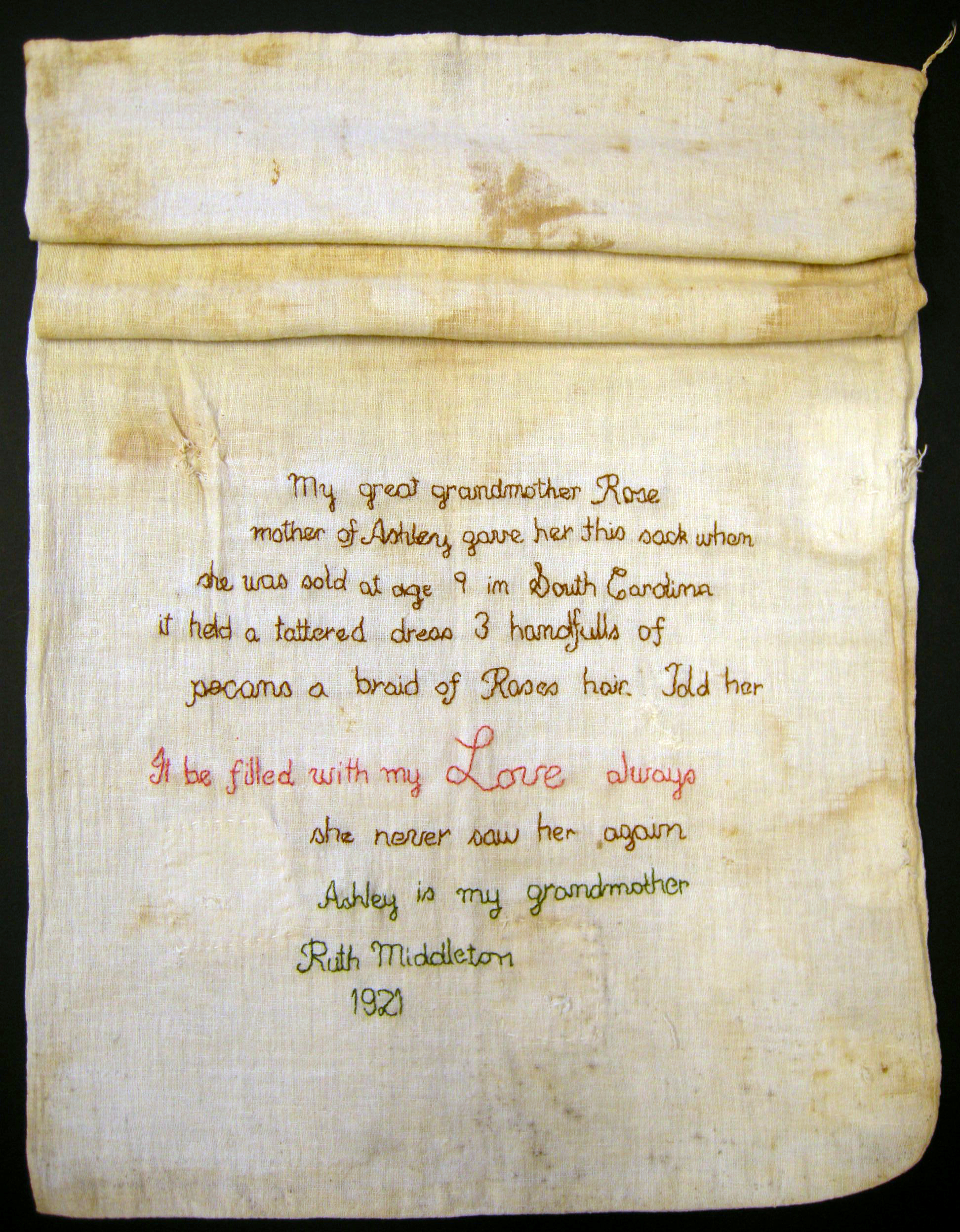
- Courtesy Middleton Place Foundation
- Material: Cotton, thread
- Size: 29 11/16 × 15 3/4 inches 75 × 40 cm
- Created: 1850s; embroidering added 1921
- Discovered: Nashville, Tennessee
- Present location: Charleston, S.C.

Ashley's sack is a mid-1800s cloth sack featuring an embroidered text that recounts the slave sale of a nine-year-old girl named Ashley and the parting gift of the sack by her mother, Rose. Rose filled the sack with a dress, braid of her hair, pecans, and "my love always". The gift was likely passed down to Ashley's granddaughter, Ruth (Jones) Middleton, who embroidered their story on to the sack in 1921.

Ashley's sack was given to Middleton Place, in Dorchester County, South Carolina, one of the nation's preeminent slavery-era plantation sites. While still owned by Middleton Place, the sack was on long-term loan to the National Museum of African American History and Culture in Washington D.C. until 2021 when it returned to Middleton Place. According to Tracey Todd, vice president of the Middleton Place Foundation, the sack is a rare material artifact from a period in United States history when human slavery was legal. Todd stated: "The sack allows us to relate to the enslaved people and feel the same pain today — if you have lost a child or been separated from a parent — that Rose and Ashley felt ... Ashley's Sack is a portal to understanding more about our shared history."

== History ==
Ashley's sack was purchased for $20 at a flea market in Nashville in the early 2000s. Alarmed by the embroidered story of a slave sale separating a mother and her daughter, the woman who purchased the sack did an Internet search for "slavery" and "Middleton" and then gifted the sack to Middleton Place.

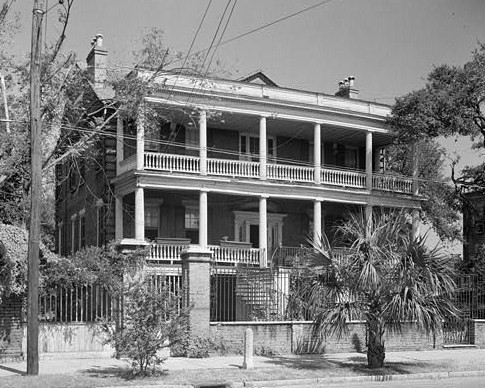
Robert Martin House, Charleston, South Carolina; Martin was a 19th-century slaveowner who owned Ashley and Rose. Ashley may have been sold away after his death.

On display from 2009 to 2013 at Middleton Place, the emotionally-charged artifact evoked human suffering and endurance. During this period, the identities of Rose, Ashley, and Ruth were unknown. It was viewed by thousands of museum visitors, including Central Washington University sociocultural anthropologist and museum-studies professor Mark Auslander, who has since traced the history of the sack to identify Ashley, her mother Rose, and the author of the needlepoint, Ruth. In the research article he published in 2016, Auslander uses census reports, wills, newspaper announcements of court decrees, and inventory records to reconstruct their history. The historical chains of remaining evidence suggest that Ashley and her mother Rose were owned by a wealthy Charleston merchant and planter, Robert Martin (c. 1790–1852), who was worth over $300,000 at his death in December 1852 (equivalent to $11,610,000 in 2025). After his death, evidence suggests Ashley was sold away from her mother in order to raise money for his heirs.

Auslander's archival work retraces the life of Ruth. He posits Ruth Middleton was born Ruth Jones in Columbia, South Carolina, around 1903. Her parents, Austin and Rosa Jones, were servants at the University of South Carolina. Ruth made her way to Philadelphia, Pennsylvania, and married Arthur Middleton, who was born around 1899 and also from South Carolina. However, Ruth and her husband are never listed as having lived together. She had a daughter, Dorothy Helen, born in Philadelphia in 1919. In 1921, when Ashley's sack was embroidered, Ruth would probably have been a single mother to a young daughter. Newspaper reports and census records suggest that throughout her life, Ruth worked in affluent households in Philadelphia. By 1928, she was well known in Philadelphia's African-American high society, gaining regular mention in the "Smart Set" and "High Society" pages of The Philadelphia Tribune, the leading African-American newspaper. Auslander writes that Ruth "host[ed] bridge and cocktail parties and [wore] elegant couture". Her daughter, Dorothy Helen, was also known for her fashion sense and authored several "Smart Set" columns.

Ruth died in January 1942 of tuberculosis. Dorothy Helen died in 1988.

== Embroidery details ==
My great grandmother Rose
mother of Ashley gave her this sack when
she was sold at age 9 in South Carolina
it held a tattered dress 3 handfulls of
pecans a braid of Roses hair. Told her
It be filled with my Love always
she never saw her again
Ashley is my grandmother

— Ruth Middleton, 1921

== Timeline ==
Professor Mark Auslander's research yields the following timeline (most dates are approximate).

- 1799–1852: Life dates of Robert Martin (Charleston, South Carolina planter and slaveowner)
- 1843/44: Ashley is born (she is 9 years old when sold at auction in 1853)
- 1853: Inventory of Martin's estate lists a Rose (in Charleston) and an Ashley (at Milberry Plantation), among c. 100 slaves Rose is valued at $700.
- 1860: Ashley listed among 125 slaves at Milberry Place Plantation, Barnwell County, South Carolina, owned by Robert Martin's widow Serene Milberry Martin, for their son Robert Martin Jr. Ashley is valued at $300.
- 1865: Civil War ends, emancipation
- 1880: approximate birth year of Ashley's daughter Rosa Clifton (Ashley's age: 36)
- 1902: Rosa Clifton marries Austin Jones
- 1903: Ruth Jones is born to Rosa and Austin in Columbia, South Carolina
- 1918: Ruth Jones marries Arthur Middleton (born c. 1899) in Philadelphia, Pennsylvania; Arthur is in the army during World War I; Ruth resides in chemical engineer Edward Linch's home, probably as a domestic
- 1919: Dorothy Helen "Dot" Middleton is born to Ruth (age 16)
- 1921: Ruth Middleton, age 18, embroiders her grandmother Ashley's sack (Ashley would have been age 77 if she was still alive)
- 1930: (perhaps since c. 1928) Ruth is employed as a domestic servant in Bryn Mawr, Pennsylvania
- 1938–42: Ruth is mentioned in and publishes columns in the society pages of Philadelphia's largest African-American newspaper in Philadelphia
- 1942: Ruth dies of tuberculosis, age 39
- 1988: Dorothy Helen (Middleton) Page dies in Wyncote, Pennsylvania, age 69
- 2007: Ashley's sack is purchased in a bundle of textiles for $20 at a flea market in Springfield, Tennessee; purchaser donates the sack to Middleton Place Foundation in Dorchester County, South Carolina, where it is displayed
- 2016: Ashley's sack displayed at the Smithsonian National Museum of African American History and Culture in Washington, D.C.
- 2021: Ashley's sack returned to Middleton Place.

== Impact ==
Heather Andrea Williams describes the sack in the epilogue of her book Help Me to Find My People as a testimony to inter-generational loss and survival. Professor Mark Auslander emphasizes the importance of the sack, and the historical reconstruction of the lives of Ashley, Rose, and Ruth, as a conduit to understanding the endurance of family lineal memory "in the face of terrible fragmentation of family solidarity caused by the domestic slave trade".

"It is an emotional object", said Mary Elliot, museum specialist with the Smithsonian, who worked on the Slavery and Freedom exhibit at the National Museum of African American History and Culture under curator Nancy Bercaw. "This piece is very important to telling that human story", Elliot said.
