= Los Angeles Times Book Prize for History =

Annual literary prize

The Los Angeles Times Book Prize for History, established in 1980, is a category of the Los Angeles Times Book Prize. Works are eligible during the year of their first US publication in English, though they may be written originally in languages other than English.

== Recipients ==
| Year | Author | Title | Result | Ref. |
|---|---|---|---|---|
| 1980 | Ronald Steel | Walter Lippmann and the American Century | Winner | |
| 1981 | Ray Allen Billington | Land of Savagery, Land of Promise: The European Image of the American Frontier in the Nineteenth Century | Winner | |
| 1982 | Jonathan D. Spence | The Gate of Heavenly Peace: The Chinese and Their Revolution, 1895–1980 | Winner | |
| 1983 | Fernand Braudel | The Wheels of Commerce | Winner | |
| 1984 | Robert Darnton | The Great Cat Massacre and Other Episodes in French Cultural History | Winner | |
| 1985 | Evan S. Connell | Son of the Morning Star: Custer and the Little Bighorn | Winner | |
| 1986 | Geoffrey Hosking | The First Socialist Society: A History of the Soviet Union from Within | Winner | |
| 1987 | Robert Jay Lifton | The Nazi Doctors: Medical Killing and the Psychology of Genocide | Winner | |
| 1988 | Eric Foner | Reconstruction: America's Unfinished Revolution, 1863–1877 | Winner | |
| 1989 | Neal Gabler | An Empire of Their Own: How the Jews Invented Hollywood | Winner | |
| 1990 | Richard Fletcher | The Quest for El Cid | Winner | |
| 1990 | David Fromkin | A Peace to End All Peace: The Fall of the Ottoman Empire and the Creation of the Modern Middle East | Finalist | |
| 1990 | Jon Butler | Awash in a Sea of Faith: Christianizing the American People | Finalist | |
| 1990 | Denis Mack Smith | Italy and its Monarchy | Finalist | |
| 1990 | Jonathan D. Spence | The Search for Modern China | Finalist | |
| 1991 | Nicholas Lemann | The Promised Land: The Great Black Migration and How It Changed America | Winner | |
| 1991 | Kevin Brownlow | Behind the Mask of Innocence: Sex, Violence, Prejudice, Crime: Films of Social Conscience in the Silent Era | Finalist | |
| 1991 | Philip A. Kuhn | Soulstealers: The Chinese Sorcery Scare of 1768 | Finalist | |
| 1991 | Robert C. Tucker | Stalin in Power: The Revolution from Above, 1928-1941 | Finalist | |
| 1991 | Daniel Yergin | The Prize: The Epic Quest for Oil, Money, and Power | Finalist | |
| 1992 | Alexander Stille | Benevolence and Betrayal: Five Italian Jewish Families under Fascism | Winner | |
| 1992 | Noel Mostert | Frontiers: The Epic of South Africa’s Creation and the Tragedy of the Xhosa People | Finalist | |
| 1992 | Robert P. Newman | Owen Lattimore and the “Loss” of China | Finalist | |
| 1992 | Greg Mitchell | The Campaign of the Century: Upton Sinclair’s Race for Governor of California and the Birth of Media Politics | Finalist | |
| 1992 | Ramón Eduardo Ruiz | Triumphs and Tragedy: A History of the Mexican People | Finalist | |
| 1993 | Anthony Grafton | New Worlds, Ancient Texts: The Power of Tradition and the Shock of Discovery | Winner | |
| 1993 | Dan Morgan | Rising in the West: The True Story of an “Okie” family in Search of the American Dream | Finalist | |
| 1993 | Alain Peyrefitte and Jon Rothschild | The Immobile Empire | Finalist | |
| 1993 | James C. Cobb | The Most Southern Place on Earth: The Mississippi Delta and the Roots of Regional Identity | Finalist | |
| 1993 | Jane Hamilton-Merritt | Tragic Mountains: The Hmong, the Americans, and the Secret Wars for Laos, 1942-1992 | Finalist | |
| 1994 | George Chauncey | Gay New York: Gender, Urban Culture, and the Making of the Gay Male World, 1890–1940 | Winner | |
| 1994 | Leonard Dinnerstein | Anti-Semitism in America | Finalist | |
| 1994 | George Sanchez | Becoming Mexican American: Ethnicity, Culture and Identity in Chicano Los Angeles, 1900-1945 | Finalist | |
| 1994 | John Boswell | Marriage of Likeness: Same-sex Unions in Pre-modern Europe | Finalist | |
| 1994 | Elizabeth Wayland Barber | Women’s Work: The First 20,000 Years: Women, Cloth, and Society in Early Times | Finalist | |
| 1995 | Jackson Lears | Fables of Abundance: A Cultural History of Advertising in America | Winner | |
| 1995 | Robert Jensen | Marketing Modernism in Fin-de-Siècle Europe | Finalist | |
| 1995 | Ian Hacking | Rewriting the Soul: Multiple Personality and the Sciences of Memory | Finalist | |
| 1995 | John Egerton | Speak Now Against the Day: The Generation Before the Civil Rights Movement in the South | Finalist | |
| 1995 | David Holloway | Stalin and the Bomb: The Soviet Union and Atomic Energy, 1939-1956 | Finalist | |
| 1996 | Neal Ascherson | Black Sea | Winner | |
| 1996 | Richard Kluger | Ashes to Ashes: America’s Hundred-Year Cigarette War, the Public Health, and the Unabashed Triumph of Philip Morris | Finalist | |
| 1996 | Kevin Starr | Endangered Dreams: The Great Depression in California | Finalist | |
| 1996 | Norman Davies | Europe: A History | Finalist | |
| 1996 | Lawrence H. Keeley | War Before Civilization: The Myth of the Peaceful Savage | Finalist | |
| 1996 | Alan Taylor | William Cooper’s Town: Power and Persuasion on the Frontier of the Early American Republic | Finalist | |
| 1997 | Orlando Figes | A People's Tragedy: A History of the Russian Revolution | Winner | |
| 1997 | Serge Schmemann | Echoes of a Native Land: Two Centuries of a Russian Village | Finalist | |
| 1997 | Peter N. Stearns | Fat History: Bodies and Beauty in the Modern West | Finalist | |
| 1997 | Saul Friedländer | Nazi Germany and the Jews: Volume 1. The Years of Persecution, 1933-1939 | Finalist | |
| 1997 | Geoffrey Moorhouse | Sun Dancing: Life in a Medieval Irish Monastery and How Celtic Spirituality Influenced the World | Finalist | |
| 1998 | Roy Porter | The Greatest Benefit to Mankind: A Medical History of Humanity | Winner | |
| 1998 | Kathy Peiss | Hope in a Jar: The Making of America’s Beauty Culture | Finalist | |
| 1998 | Ira Berlin | Many Thousands Gone: The First Two Centuries of Slavery in North America | Finalist | |
| 1998 | Philip D. Morgan | Slave Counterpoint: Black Culture in the Eighteenth-Century Chesapeake and Lowcountry | Finalist | |
| 1998 | Nancy Tomes | The Gospel of Germs: Men, Women, and the Microbe in American Life | Finalist | |
| 1999 | John W. Dower | Embracing Defeat: Japan in the Wake of World War II | Winner | |
| 1999 | David Haward Bain | Empire Express: Building the 1st Transcontinental Railroad | Finalist | |
| 1999 | David M. Kennedy | Freedom from Fear: The American People in Depression and War, 1929-1945 | Finalist | |
| 1999 | John Keegan | The First World War | Finalist | |
| 1999 | Peter Novick | The Holocaust in American Life | Finalist | |
| 2000 | Alice Kaplan | The Collaborator: The Trial and Execution of Robert Brasillach | Winner | |
| 2000 | Nathaniel Philbrick | In the Heart of the Sea: The Tragedy of the Whaleship Essex | Finalist | |
| 2000 | Tim Judah | Kosovo: War and Revenge | Finalist | |
| 2000 | Shareen Blair Brysac | Resisting Hitler: Mildred Harnack and the Red Orchestra | Finalist | |
| 2000 | Alexander Keyssar | The Right to Vote: The Contested History of Democracy in the United States | Finalist | |
| 2001 | Rick Perlstein | Before the Storm: Barry Goldwater and the Unmaking of the American Consensus | Winner | |
| 2001 | Julian Jackson | France: The Dark Years, 1940-1944 | Finalist | |
| 2001 | Louis Menand | The Metaphysical Club: A Story of Ideas in America | Finalist | |
| 2001 | G.E. Bentley Jr. | The Stranger from Paradise: A Biography of William Blake | Finalist | |
| 2001 | Garry Wills | Venice: Lion City | Finalist | |
| 2002 | Michael B. Oren | Six Days of War: June 1967 and the Making of the Modern Middle East | Winner | |
| 2002 | Philip Dray | At the Hands of Persons Unknown: The Lynching of Black America | Finalist | |
| 2002 | Gregg Herken | Brotherhood of the Bomb: The Tangled Lives and Loyalties of Robert Oppenheimer, Ernest Lawrence and Edward Teller | Finalist | |
| 2002 | Mary Beth Norton | In the Devil’s Snare: The Salem Witchcraft Crisis of 1692 | Finalist | |
| 2002 | Robert W. Harms | The Diligent: A Voyage Through the Worlds of the Slave Trade | Finalist | |
| 2003 | Henry Wiencek | An Imperfect God: George Washington, His Slaves, and the Creation of America | Winner | |
| 2003 | Anne Applebaum | Gulag: A History | Finalist | |
| 2003 | Louis Crompton | Homosexuality and Civilization | Finalist | |
| 2003 | David Maraniss | They Marched Into Sunlight: War and Peace, Vietnam and America, October 1967 | Finalist | |
| 2003 | Timothy Tackett | When the King Took Flight | Finalist | |
| 2004 | Geoffrey R. Stone | Perilous Times: Free Speech in Wartime from the Sedition Act of 1798 to the War on Terrorism | Winner | |
| 2004 | Richard Steven Street | Beasts of the Field: A Narrative History of California Farm Workers, 1769-1913 | Finalist | |
| 2004 | Max Frankel | High Noon in the Cold War: Kennedy, Khrushchev, and the Cuban Missile Crisis | Finalist | |
| 2004 | Alfred F. Young | Masquerade: The Life and Times of Deborah Sampson, Continental Soldier | Finalist | |
| 2004 | Richard J. Evans | The Coming of the Third Reich: Volume 1 of The Third Reich Series | Finalist | |
| 2005 | Adam Hochschild | Bury the Chains: Prophets and Rebels in the Fight to Free an Empire's Slaves | Winner | |
| 2005 | Christopher Bayly and Tim Harper | Forgotten Armies: The Fall of British Asia, 1941-1945 | Finalist | |
| 2005 | Tony Judt | Postwar: A History of Europe Since 1945 | Finalist | |
| 2005 | Sean Wilentz | The Rise of American Democracy: Jefferson to Lincoln | Finalist | |
| 2005 | Richard J. Evans | The Third Reich in Power: Volume 2 of The Third Reich Series | Finalist | |
| 2006 | Lawrence Wright | The Looming Tower: Al-Qaeda and the Road to 9/11 | Winner | |
| 2006 | Taylor Branch | At Canaan’s Edge: Volume 3 of America in the King Years, 1965-68 | Finalist | |
| 2006 | Nathaniel Philbrick | Mayflower: A Story of Courage, Community, and War | Finalist | |
| 2006 | John Tayman | The Colony: The Harrowing True Story of the Exiles of Molokai | Finalist | |
| 2006 | Niall Ferguson | The War of the World: Twentieth-Century Conflict and the Descent of the West | Finalist | |
| 2007 | Tim Weiner | Legacy of Ashes: The History of the CIA | Winner | |
| 2007 | Margaret MacMillan | Nixon and Mao: The Week that Changed the World | Finalist | |
| 2007 | David A. Bell | The First Total War: Napoleon’s Europe and the Birth of Warfare as We Know It | Finalist | |
| 2007 | Andrew Nagorski | The Greatest Battle: Stalin, Hitler, and the Desperate Struggle for Moscow that Changed the Course of World War II | Finalist | |
| 2007 | Lynne Olson | Troublesome Young Men: The Rebels Who Brought Churchill to Power and Helped Save England | Finalist | |
| 2008 | Mark Mazower | Hitler's Empire: How the Nazis Ruled Europe | Winner | |
| 2008 | Rick Wartzman | Obscene in the Extreme: The Burning and Banning of John Steinbeck’s The Grapes of Wrath | Finalist | |
| 2008 | Michael Dobbs | One Minute to Midnight: Kennedy, Khrushchev, and Castro on the Brink of Nuclear War | Finalist | |
| 2008 | Thomas J. Sugrue | Sweet Land of Liberty: The Forgotten Struggle for Civil Rights in the North | Finalist | |
| 2008 | Drew Gilpin Faust | This Republic of Suffering: Death and the American Civil War | Finalist | |
| 2009 | Kevin Starr | Golden Dreams: California in an Age of Abundance 1950–1963 | Winner | |
| 2009 | Gordon S. Wood | Empire of Liberty: A History of the Early Republic, 1789–1815 | Finalist | |
| 2009 | Amy Louise Wood | Lynching and Spectacle: Witnessing Racial Violence in America, 1890-1940 | Finalist | |
| 2009 | Martha A. Sandweiss | Passing Strange: A Gilded Age Tale of Love and Deception Across the Color Line | Finalist | |
| 2009 | Richard Holmes | The Age of Wonder: How the Romantic Generation Discovered the Beauty and Terror of Science | Finalist | |
| 2010 | Thomas Powers | The Killing of Crazy Horse | Winner | |
| 2010 | John W. Dower | Cultures of War: Pearl Harbor/Hiroshima/9-11/Iraq | | |
| 2010 | Susan Dunn | Roosevelt’s Purge: How FDR Fought to Change the Democratic Party | | |
| 2010 | Ron Chernow | Washington: A Life | | |
| 2010 | Steven Solomon | Water: The Epic Struggle for Wealth, Power, and Civilization | | |
| 2011 | Richard White | Railroaded: The Transcontinentals and the Making of Modern America | Winner | |
| 2011 | Adam Goodheart | 1861: The Civil War Awakening | Finalist | |
| 2011 | Rachel Polonsky | Molotov’s Magic Lantern: Travels in Russian History | Finalist | |
| 2011 | Javier Cercas with Anne McLean (trans.) | The Anatomy of a Moment: Thirty-Five Minutes in History and Imagination | Finalist | |
| 2011 | Adam Hochschild | To End All Wars: A Story of Loyalty and Rebellion, 1914-1918 | Finalist | |
| 2012 | Fergus M. Bordewich | America's Great Debate: Henry Clay, Stephen A. Douglas, and the Compromise That Preserved the Union | Winner | |
| 2012 | Amy S. Greenberg | A Wicked War: Polk, Clay, Lincoln, and the 1846 U.S. Invasion of Mexico | Finalist | |
| 2012 | George Black | Empire of Shadows: The Epic Story of Yellowstone | Finalist | |
| 2012 | John M. Barry | Roger Williams and the Creation of the American Soul: Church, State, and the Birth of Liberty | Finalist | |
| 2012 | Geoffrey Kabaservice | Rule and Ruin: The Downfall of Moderation and the Destruction of the Republican Party, From Eisenhower to the Tea Party | Finalist | |
| 2013 | Christopher Clark | The Sleepwalkers: How Europe Went to War in 1914 | Winner | |
| 2013 | Richard Breitman and Allan J. Lichtman | FDR and the Jews | Finalist | |
| 2013 | Doris Kearns Goodwin | The Bully Pulpit: Theodore Roosevelt, William Howard Taft, and the Golden Age of Journalism | Finalist | |
| 2013 | Alan Taylor | The Internal Enemy: Slavery and War in Virginia, 1772-1832 | Finalist | |
| 2013 | Glenn Frankel | The Searchers: The Making of an American Legend | Finalist | |
| 2014 | Adam Tooze | The Deluge: The Great War, America and the Remaking of the Global Order, 1916–1931 | Winner | |
| 2014 | Mark Harris | Five Came Back: A Story of Hollywood and the Second World War | Finalist | |
| 2014 | Walter Isaacson | The Innovators: How a Group of Hackers, Geniuses, and Geeks Created the Digital Revolution | Finalist | |
| 2014 | Judith Flanders | The Victorian City: Everyday Life in Dickens’ London | Finalist | |
| 2014 | Lawrence Wright | Thirteen Days in September: Carter, Begin, and Sadat at Camp David | Finalist | |
| 2015 | Dan Ephron | Killing a King: The Assassination of Yitzhak Rabin and the Remaking of Israel | Winner | |
| 2015 | Jonathan M. Bryant | Dark Places of the Earth: The Voyage of the Slave Ship Antelope | Finalist | |
| 2015 | David Maraniss | Once in a Great City: A Detroit Story | Finalist | |
| 2015 | Mary Beard | SPQR: A History of Ancient Rome | Finalist | |
| 2015 | Mark Molesky | This Gulf of Fire: The Destruction of Lisbon, or Apocalypse in the Age of Science and Reason | Finalist | |
| 2016 | Benjamin Madley | An American Genocide: The United States and the California Indian Catastrophe, 1846–1873 | Winner | |
| 2016 | Heather Ann Thompson | Blood in the Water: The Attica Prison Uprising of 1971 and Its Legacy | Finalist | |
| 2016 | Adam Hochschild | Spain in Our Hearts: Americans in the Spanish Civil War, 1936–1939 | Finalist | |
| 2016 | Masha Gessen | Where the Jews Aren’t: The Sad and Absurd Story of Birobidzhan, Russia’s Jewish Autonomous Region | Finalist | |
| 2016 | Nancy Isenberg | White Trash: The 400-Year Untold History of Class in America | Finalist | |
| 2017 | Dan Egan | The Death and Life of the Great Lakes | Winner | |
| 2017 | Richard Rothstein | The Color of Law: A Forgotten History of How Our Government Segregated America | Finalist | |
| 2017 | Frances FitzGerald | The Evangelicals: The Struggle to Shape America | Finalist | |
| 2017 | Mark Bowden | Hue 1968: A Turning Point of the American War in Vietnam | Finalist | |
| 2017 | Stephen Alford | London’s Triumph: Merchants, Adventurers, and Money in Shakespeare’s City | Finalist | |
| 2018 | Julia Boyd | Travelers in the Third Reich: The Rise of Fascism: 1919–1945 | Winner | |
| 2019 | Stephanie Jones-Rogers | They Were Her Property: White Women as Slave Owners in the American South | Winner | |
| 2020 | Martha S. Jones | Vanguard: How Black Women Broke Barriers, Won the Vote, and Insisted on Equality for All | Winner | |
| 2020 | Alice L. Baumgartner | South to Freedom: Runaway Slaves to Mexico and the Road to the Civil War | Finalist | |
| 2020 | Adam Goodman | The Deportation Machine: America’s Long History of Expelling Immigrants | Finalist | |
| 2020 | Walter Johnson | The Broken Heart of America: St. Louis and the Violent History of the United States | Finalist | |
| 2020 | David Vine | The United States of War: A Global History of America’s Endless Conflicts, From Columbus to the Islamic State | Finalist | |
| 2021 | Ada Ferrer | Cuba: An American History | Winner | |
| 2021 | Mia Bay | Traveling Black: A Story of Race and Resistance | Finalist | |
| 2021 | Mae Ngai | The Chinese Question: The Gold Rushes and Global Politics | Finalist | |
| 2021 | Olivette Otele | African Europeans: An Untold History | Finalist | |
| 2021 | Alaina E. Roberts | I've Been Here All the While: Black Freedom on Native Land | Finalist | |
| 2022 | Margaret Burnham | By Hands Now Known: Jim Crow’s Legal Executioners | Winner | |
| 2022 | Hugh Eakin | Picasso’s War: How Modern Art Came to America | Finalist | |
| 2022 | Kerri K. Greenidge | The Grimkes: The Legacy of Slavery in an American Family | Finalist | |
| 2022 | Andrew M. Wehrman | The Contagion of Liberty: The Politics of Smallpox in the American Revolution | Finalist | |
| 2022 | Donald Yacovone | Teaching White Supremacy: America’s Democratic Ordeal and the Forging of our National Identity | Finalist | |
| 2023 | Joya Chatterji | Shadows at Noon: The South Asian Twentieth Century | Winner | |
| 2023 | Ned Blackhawk | The Rediscovery of America: Native Peoples and the Unmaking of U.S. History | Finalist | |
| 2023 | Malcolm Harris | Palo Alto: A History of California, Capitalism, and the World | Finalist | |
| 2023 | Blair L.M. Kelley | Black Folk: The Roots of the Black Working Class | Finalist | |
| 2023 | Nikki M. Taylor | Brooding Over Bloody Revenge: Enslaved Women’s Lethal Resistance | Finalist | |
