= List of Booknotes interviews first aired in 2000 =

Booknotes is an American television series on the C-SPAN network hosted by Brian Lamb, which originally aired from 1989 to 2004. The format of the show is a one-hour, one-on-one interview with a non-fiction author. The series was broadcast at 8 p.m. Eastern Time each Sunday night, and was the longest-running author interview program in U.S. broadcast history.

First broadcast (with link to transcript / video)	Author	Book	Subject matter
January 2, 2000 and January 9, 2000	Thomas Keneally	The Great Shame and the Triumph of the Irish in the English-Speaking World	Irish diaspora; Irish migration to Great Britain; Irish Canadians; Irish Americans; Irish Australians; History of Ireland (1801–1923); Great Famine (Ireland)
January 16, 2000	William Least Heat-Moon	River-Horse: A Voyage Across America	Travel literature; The United States of America
January 23, 2000	Isaac Stern	My First 79 Years	Memoir/Autobiography; Classical music; Violins
January 30, 2000	Robert Novak	Completing the Revolution: A Vision for Victory in 2000	Conservatism in the United States; United States elections, 2000; 2000 United States presidential election; United States House of Representatives elections, 2000; United States Senate elections, 2000; United States gubernatorial elections, 2000
February 6, 2000	Arthur Herman	Joseph McCarthy: Reexamining the Life and Legacy of America's Most Hated Senator	Joseph McCarthy
February 13, 2000	Arianna Huffington	How to Overthrow the Government	Politics of the United States
February 20, 2000	Cornel West	The Cornel West Reader	Essays; African American studies
February 27, 2000	Gina Kolata	Flu: The Story of the Great Influenza Pandemic of 1918 and the Search for the Virus that Caused It	1918 flu pandemic
March 5, 2000	David Haward Bain	Empire Express: Building the First Transcontinental Railroad	First transcontinental railroad
March 12, 2000	Howard Zinn	A People's History of the United States, 1492-Present	U.S. History; Populism
March 19, 2000	Loung Ung	First They Killed My Father: A Daughter of Cambodia Remembers	Memoir/Autobiography; Khmer Rouge rule of Cambodia
March 26, 2000	John Dower	Embracing Defeat: Japan in the Wake of World War II	Occupation of Japan
April 2, 2000	Philip Short	Mao: A Life	Mao Zedong
April 9, 2000	Tavis Smiley	Doing What's Right: How to Fight for What You Believe In - And Make a Difference	Essays
April 16, 2000	Allen Guelzo	Abraham Lincoln: Redeemer President	Abraham Lincoln
April 23, 2000	Walter Mosley	Workin' on the Chain Gang: Shaking Off the Dead Hand of History	Politics of the United States; Economics of the United States
April 30, 2000	Ward Connerly	Creating Equal: My Fight Against Race Preferences	Memoir/Autobiography; Affirmative action
May 7, 2000	David Wise	Cassidy's Run: The Street Spy War Over Nerve Gas	History of Soviet and Russian espionage in the United States; Counterintelligence
May 14, 2000	Stephanie Gutmann	The Kinder, Gentler Military: Can America's Gender-Neutral Fighting Force Still Win Wars?	Women in the military; Military history of the United States
May 21, 2000	James Perry	A Bohemian Brigade: The Civil War Correspondents - Mostly Rough, Sometimes Ready	History of journalism; The American Civil War
May 28, 2000	David Crosby	Stand and Be Counted: Making Music, Making History	Memoir/Autobiography; Crosby, Stills, Nash & Young; The Byrds
June 4, 2000	Zachary Karabell	The Last Campaign: How Harry Truman Won the 1948 Election	Harry S. Truman; 1948 United States presidential election
June 11, 2000	Dan Baum	Citizen Coors: An American Dynasty	Category:Coors family; Coors Brewing Company
June 18, 2000	Joyce Appleby	Inheriting the Revolution: The First Generation of Americans	History of the United States (1789–1849); Timeline of United States history (1790–1819)
June 25, 2000	Francis Wheen	Karl Marx: A Life	Karl Marx
July 9, 2000	James Bradley	Flags of Our Fathers	Raising the Flag on Iwo Jima
July 16, 2000	Brooks Simpson	Ulysses S. Grant: Triumph Over Adversity	Ulysses S. Grant
July 23, 2000	Elizabeth Taylor	American Pharaoh: Mayor Richard J. Daley	Richard J. Daley
July 30, 2000	David Brooks	Bobos in Paradise: The New Upper Class and How They Got There	Yuppies; American upper class; Meritocracy
August 6, 2000	H. Paul Jeffers	An Honest President: The Life & Presidencies of Grover Cleveland	Grover Cleveland
August 13, 2000	Jane Alexander	Command Performance: An Actress in the Theater of Politics	Memoir/Autobiography; National Endowment for the Arts
August 20, 2000	Harry Stein	How I Accidentally Joined the Vast Right-Wing Conspiracy	Memoir/Autobiography; American Left; Conservatism in America
August 27, 2000	Ted Gup	The Book of Honor: Covert Lives & Classified Deaths at the CIA	The Central Intelligence Agency
September 3, 2000	Harold Bloom	How to Read and Why	Literature
September 10, 2000	Lerone Bennett	Forced Into Glory: Abraham Lincoln's White Dream	Abraham Lincoln
September 17, 2000	Alan Murray	The Wealth of Choices: How the New Economy Puts Power in Your Hand & Money in Your Pocket	The New Economy
September 22, 2000	Karen Armstrong	Islam: A Short History	Islam
September 24, 2000	Michael Paterniti	Driving Mr. Albert: A Trip Across America with Einstein's Brain	Albert Einstein's brain
October 1, 2000	Nina Easton	Gang of Five: Leaders at the Center of the Conservative Crusade	Bill Kristol; Ralph Reed; Clint Bolick; Grover Norquist; David McIntosh
October 8, 2000	Diane Ravitch	Left Back: A Century of Failed School Reforms	Education reform
October 15, 2000	Rick Bragg	Somebody Told Me: The Newspaper Stories of Rick Bragg	Journalism
November 5, 2000	Bonnie Angelo	First Mothers	
November 12, 2000	William Duiker	Ho Chi Minh: A Life	Ho Chi Minh
November 19, 2000	Maya Lin	Boundaries	Memoir/Autobiography; Architecture; Public art; Vietnam Veterans Memorial
November 26, 2000	Murray Sperber	Beer & Circus	College athletics
December 10, 2000	Frank Rich	Ghost Light: A Memoir	Memoir/Autobiography; Broadway theatre
December 17, 2000	Harvey Mansfield	Alexis de Tocqueville's Democracy in America	Alexis de Tocqueville
December 24, 2000	Robert Putnam	Bowling Alone	Social capital; Civil society
December 31, 2000	Peter Hitchens	The Abolition of Britain: From Winston Churchill to Princess Diana	Political history of the United Kingdom (1945–present)
