= Gloster H. Hill =

American politician (died 1919)

Gloster H. Hill (c. 1840 – 1919) was a state legislator in Louisiana. He represented Ascension Parish in the from 1868-1870 and 1874-1876 in the Louisiana House of Representatives during the Reconstruction era.

According to Eric Foner he was born free and was "mulatto".
