= Matthew T. Newsom =

American politician

Matthew T. Newsom, sometimes spelled Newsome, was an American justice of the peace and state legislator in Mississippi during the Reconstruction era. He represented Claiborne County at the 1868 Mississippi Constitutional Convention and from 1870 to 1871 in the Mississippi House of Representatives.

He was born in North Carolina. The Clarion Ledger identified him as "colored". Eric Foner documented him as "mulatto" and a Methodist minister. Newsom opposed poll taxes and supported land redistribution from slave plantations to freed blacks.

He attended the Mississippi black convention of 1865 and the Republican State Convention in 1867.
