= Arthur Wynn =

British civil servant and Soviet spy

- Born: Arthur Henry Ashford Wynn; 22 January 1910; United Kingdom
- Died: 24 September 2001 (aged 91); London, England
- Education: Oundle School; Trinity College, Cambridge; University of Oxford; Lincoln's Inn
- Known for: Civil servant, Social Researcher, Spy
- Political party: Communist Party of Great Britain
- Spouse(s): Lieschen Ostrowski (div); Margaret (Peggy) Moxon (his death)
- Children: 3 sons, 1 daughter
- Relatives: Adam Tooze (grandson)

Arthur Henry Ashford Wynn (22 January 1910 – 24 September 2001) was a British civil servant, social researcher, and recruiter of spies for the Soviet NKVD.

== Early life ==
Wynn was the son of a professor of medicine. Educated at Oundle School, he played rugby union. Wynn read natural sciences and mathematics at Trinity College, Cambridge.

Wynn was in Germany when Adolf Hitler became Chancellor. He married German communist Lieschen Ostrowski, to enable her to escape Nazi Germany.

He returned to England, dissolved his marriage, and moved to Oxford for further study. While at the University of Oxford he joined the Clarendon Club, and met and married Margaret 'Peggy' Moxon (17 April 1913 – 8 January 2010), a student and a fellow member of the Communist Party of Great Britain. They married in 1938, and had four children (three sons and a daughter). In the following year, Arthur and Peggy Wynn wrote a study of the financial connections of the Conservative establishment which they published as "Tory M.P." It was published in the USA as "England's Money Lords"; the Wynns published under the pseudonym 'Simon Haxey'.

Intending to specialise in trade union law in partnership with Sir Stafford Cripps QC, Wynn studied law at Lincoln's Inn, and was called to the bar in 1939. During World War II, Wynn worked as a technical specialist on secondment at electronics company A.C. Cossor, working on projects that include IFF radar and advanced navigational aids for RAF Bomber Command.

== Agent Scott ==
Recruited by Edith Tudor-Hart in 1936, Wynn was the Soviet spy known as "Agent Scott" of the NKVD. Wynn created the less prominent Oxford spy ring, in some sense the University of Oxford "counterpart" to the Cambridge Five.

The name Agent Scott first appeared in Soviet files in October 1936. In the 1998 book The Crown Jewels by writer Nigel West and the former KGB officer Oleg Tsarev, the NKVD London station reported a significant intelligence coup, stating that Edith Tudor-Hart had recruited "a second Sohnchen," the code name used for Kim Philby. The memo further stated that "in all probabilities, they offer even greater possibilities than the first."

During the Stalinist purges, the NKVD's London recruiting station was briefly closed, but "Agent Scott" appears to have maintained contact, and by 1941 he was recruiting additional sources.

== Spying ==
Recruited to the NKVD's British team, Wynn began sending reports on Oxford members of the Communist Party. These were related to recruitment of spies, of which he listed 25, for which later screening – which Wynn himself was subjected to – five were considered highly suitable. These included an individual code-named "Bunny", who has never been identified. The basis of the Oxford spy ring he ran are suspected to have included a former Labour MP, a former director of the Victoria and Albert Museum and an Oxford don.

This team Wynn recruited became the basis for the Oxford spy ring. Another Oxford student that Wynn recruited was David Floyd. Floyd joined the British Diplomatic Service and spied for the Russians in Moscow at the UK military mission and the British embassy from 1944 to 1947 and then was posted to Belgrade. Wynn also identified and offered to recruit students from the University of Cambridge and the University of London, but his handlers urged him to be more "selective. There should be no mass recruitment."

== Post-war ==
Moved by a series of post-war coal mining disasters, he switched his attention to mining safety. After the nationalisation of the coal industry in 1948, Wynn became director of mining safety research at the Ministry of Fuel and Power. He was the National Coal Board's scientific member from 1955 to 1965, and then a senior civil servant in Tony Benn's Ministry of Technology until his retirement in 1971.

Post-retirement, with his wife he became a prominent medical researcher and social commentator, particularly in the area of nutrition. Their papers were widely published and read, and used by many politicians to advance their own political agenda. Through their publications, the Wynns struck up a friendship with Tory MP Peter Bottomley. Tory leadership hopeful Keith Joseph based a 1975 speech on their published article for the Child Poverty Action Group examining the issue of poverty and single parenthood. Joseph's interpretation of the article lost him the support of Margaret Thatcher, who decided to run for the leadership herself.

== Public revelations from 1992 ==
The real name of "Agent Scott" first came to light when the KGB permitted access to its files in 1992. The double life of Wynn was exposed in The Weekly Standard magazine by historians John Earl Haynes, Harvey Klehr and former KGB officer Alexander Vassiliev.

The KGB refused to divulge "Agent Scott"'s name in 1992, prompting media speculation of a series of moles. When the KGB confirmed the existence of "Agent Scott" in 1996, the mole was incorrectly described as an Old Etonian, a Scotsman and a member of the Foreign Office: Wynn was none of these. Those accused of being "Agent Scott" therefore included former diplomat Sir David Scott Fox and Sir Peter Wilson, the former chairman of Sotheby's.

From information uncovered by Vassiliev, a memo dated July 1941 from Pavel Fitin, the NKVD's war time head of counter-intelligence, to NKGB chief Vsevolod Merkulov, named "Agent Scott" as Wynn. It also identified "Scott's" recruiters as London based NKVD controller Theodore Maly, and Austrian-born spy Edith Tudor-Hart, who also recruited Kim Philby:

Scott is Arthur Wynn. About 35 years old, member of the CP (Communist Party) of England, graduated from Oxford and Cambridge univs, radio expert, design engineer for the Cossor Co. recruited in Oct. 34 by "Stephan" (Mally) from "Edith's" (Tudor Hart) lead.

== Personal life ==
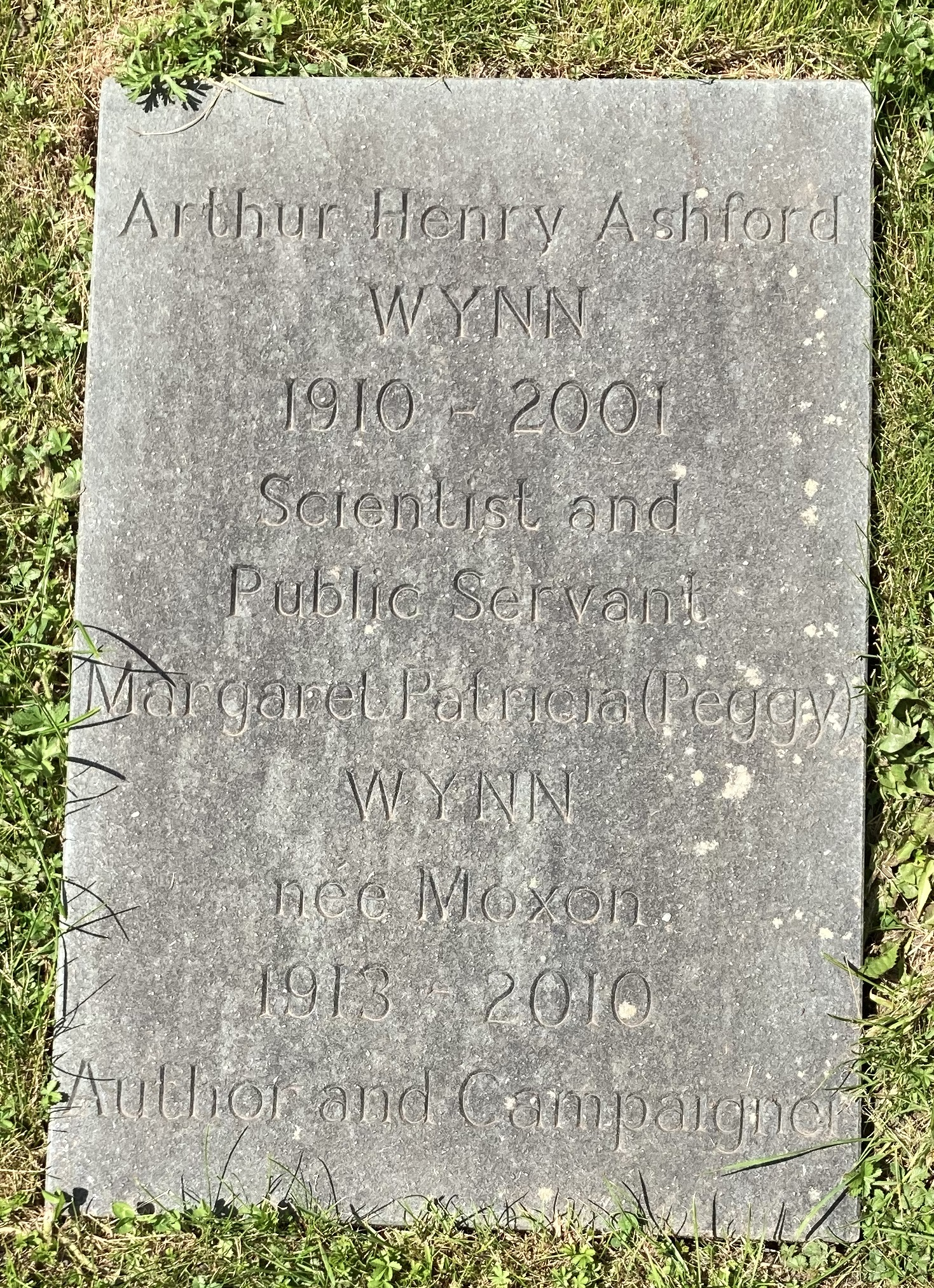
Grave of Arthur Wynn in Highgate Cemetery

Arthur Wynn died in London in 2001 and his ashes were buried on the west side of Highgate Cemetery.

Wynn is the grandfather of the historian and author Adam Tooze. Tooze's book, The Wages of Destruction (2006), is dedicated to Wynn and his wife, Peggy.
