= David Bain (disambiguation) =

David Bain (born 1972) is a New Zealand man who was acquitted of murder in 2009.

David Bain may also refer to:

- David Bain (Australian footballer) (born 1966)
- David Bain (Scottish footballer) (1900–1966)
- David Haward Bain (born 1949), writer
- David McLaren Bain (1891–1915), Scottish rugby union player killed in World War I
- Roly Bain (1954–2016), English priest and professional clown, born David Roualeyn Findlater Bain
