= Cuba: An American History =

Non-fiction book

- Author: Ada Ferrer
- Publisher: Scribner
- Publication date: September 07, 2021
- ISBN: 9781501154553

Cuba: An American History is a historical book by Ada Ferrer which was published in 2021.

== Awards ==
- Pulitzer Prize for History in 2022
- Los Angeles Times Book Prize for History in 2022
- Finalist for the Cundill History Prize in 2022

== Critical reception and reviews ==
Oliver Balch of Americas Quarterly wrote "Through the story of one small island, Cuba: An American History allows Americans to look at themselves through the eyes of others." Daniel Ray of North American Congress on Latin America wrote "Her book is likely to become the definitive history of Cuba for this generation."

The book has also been reviewed by Felipe Fernández-Armesto of The Wall Street Journal, Jeremy Ray Jewell of The Arts Fuse, Esther Allen of the Los Angeles Review of Books and Carrie Gibson of The Guardian.
