= A. A. Rogers =

American politician

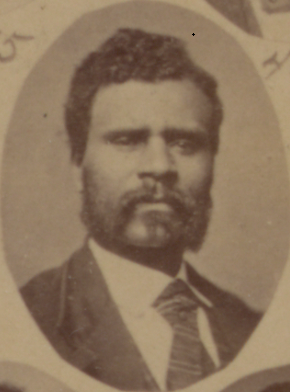

A. A. Rogers or A. A. Rodgers was a state legislator in Mississippi. He was a representative of Marshall County, Mississippi in the Mississippi House of Representatives from 1874 to 1875. He was a Republican, and African American. In 1873, he served in the state Republican convention. He aligned with the temperance movement, and voted to sustain the governor's veto of a bill relating to liquor.

Eric Foner lists him as A. A. Rodgers in Freedom's Lawmakers. He is listed with the same name in a Vicksburg Times article in 1873.

== See also ==
- African American officeholders from the end of the Civil War until before 1900
