= The Fiery Trial =

2010 book by Eric Foner

The Fiery Trial: Abraham Lincoln and American Slavery
- Hardcover edition
- Author: Eric Foner
- Language: English
- Subject: Abraham Lincoln; Slavery in the United States
- Genre: Non-fiction
- Published: October 4, 2010
- Publisher: W. W. Norton & Company
- Publication place: United States
- Media type: Print, e-book
- Pages: 448
- ISBN: 0-393-06618-5

The Fiery Trial: Abraham Lincoln and American Slavery is a 2010 biography of Abraham Lincoln written by the American historian Eric Foner. It focuses on the evolution of Lincoln's stance on slavery in the United States. The Fiery Trial, which derives its title from Lincoln's Annual Message to Congress of December 1, 1862, was the 22nd book written by Foner, the DeWitt Clinton Professor of History at Columbia University. It was praised by critics and won the 2011 Pulitzer Prize for History, the Bancroft Prize, and the Lincoln Prize.

== Synopsis ==
In the preface to The Fiery Trial, Eric Foner states his intention to trace "the evolution of Lincoln's ideas and policies about slavery from his early life through his career in the Illinois legislature in the 1830s, his term in Congress in the 1840s, his emergence as a leader of the new Republican party in the 1850s, and his presidency during the Civil War". The book closely examines Lincoln's speeches and writings, and avoids direct engagement with previous Lincoln historians.

The Fiery Trial begins with Lincoln's encounters with slavery in his early life, growing up in Kentucky and Indiana. He occasionally dealt with issues of slavery in his law practice in Illinois. The book also discusses Lincoln's position on slavery in the context of his political career. Lincoln was a moderate, attempting to bridge the gap between the abolitionist Radical Republicans and conservative Democrats, including those in the slave-holding states, whom he hoped would choose preserving the Union over steadfastly defending slavery. Lincoln initially supported the idea of voluntary colonization of freed blacks to Africa, a stance supported by some politicians at the time, although considered unethical by many. However, Lincoln eventually abandoned his moderate stance on slavery when he determined that to win the American Civil War, he needed to act to end slavery.

In the epilogue, Foner praises Lincoln's "capacity for growth, the essence of [his] greatness", and speculates that had he not been assassinated, he could have helped to prevent the disenfranchisement and segregation of blacks that followed emancipation. Foner concludes with a quotation by abolitionist Lydia Maria Child:

I think we have reason to thank God for Abraham Lincoln ... With all his deficiencies, it must be admitted that he has grown continuously; and considering how slavery had weakened and perverted the moral sense of the whole country, it was great good luck to have the people elect a man who was willing to grow.

== Background ==
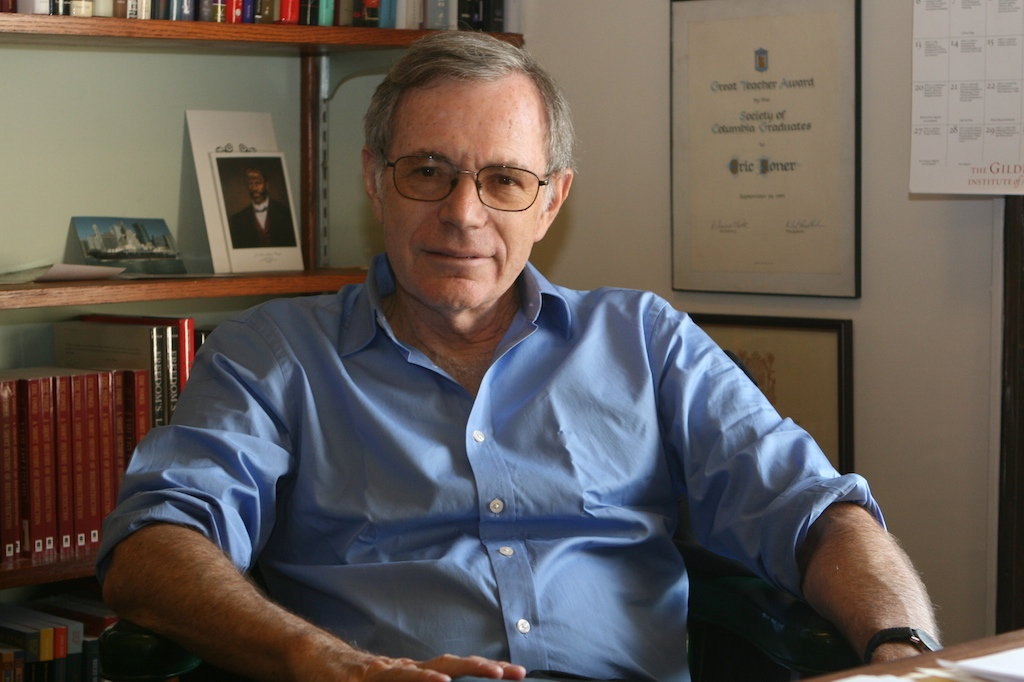
Eric Foner, the book's author

Eric Foner, the book's author, is the DeWitt Clinton Professor of History at Columbia University. His specialties include the American Civil War and the subsequent Reconstruction Era. The Fiery Trial was his 22nd book. Foner's 1989 book Reconstruction: America's Unfinished Revolution, 1863-1877 won the Bancroft Prize of Columbia University, an award also given to The Fiery Trial.

Before The Fiery Trial, several of Foner's works had discussed Lincoln, but this was the first of his books to study the president directly. Foner began the book because he believed "that it was still possible to say something new, despite the voluminous literature that's out there."

The Fiery Trial was published in 2010 by W.W. Norton & Company. The book's title is a quotation from Lincoln's December 1, 1862, Annual Message to Congress (today the State of the Union address), in which he said of the Civil War: "Fellow citizens, we cannot escape history. We of this Congress and this administration, will be remembered in spite of ourselves.... The fiery trial through which we pass, will light us down, in honor or dishonor, to the latest generation."

== Reception ==
The Fiery Trial was generally well received by critics, who praised its insights and lucidity. David S. Reynolds, reviewing for The New York Times, described the book as a "political biography of Lincoln", and concluded that "More cogently than any previous historian, Foner examines the political events that shaped Lincoln and ultimately brought out his true greatness." James M. McPherson, a previous winner of the Pulitzer Prize for History, stated of the book that "No one else has written about [Lincoln's] trajectory of change with such balance, fairness, depth of analysis, and lucid precision of language." Library Journal called it "an essential work for all Americans.... In the vast library on Lincoln, Foner's book stands out as the most sensible and sensitive reading of Lincoln's lifetime involvement with slavery and the most insightful assessment of Lincoln's—and indeed America's—imperative to move toward freedom lest it be lost." David M. Shribman, writing in The Boston Globe, called Foner "perhaps the preeminent historian of the Civil War era" and the book "a masterwork that examines Lincoln's passage to Gettysburg and beyond". In the San Francisco Chronicle, David W. Blight called The Fiery Trial "a distinctive and valuable book, showing persuasively that we should not understand Lincoln from the myth-glazed outcome reading backward, but from the beginning, through one transformative event after another, looking forward."

In a review for The Historian, Lawrence Frederick Kohl wrote of the book that "Eric Foner's prodigious research and his deep knowledge of the era allow him to provide perhaps the best account of this subject available today. Even seasoned scholars will find facts in this volume that are new to them and fresh insights that they will want to consider." Patrick Prendergast stated in The Irish Times that "For the interested but non-specialist reader Foner's book is a triumph, and he explains the progression in Lincoln's views of slavery in an accessible and exciting way."

Reviewing for The Washington Post, Fred Kaplan was more critical. Though Kaplan stated that the "comprehensive review of mostly familiar material" would make The Fiery Trial "the book of first convenience to go to on the subject", he also argued that in contrast to Foner's thesis of growth, "a stronger argument can be made that Lincoln hardly 'grew' at all on the issue of slavery, that he responded to changing circumstances that he did not create...."

The Fiery Trial won the 2011 Pulitzer Prize for History, the Bancroft Prize, and the Lincoln Prize. The New York Times Book Review listed The Fiery Trial as one of its 100 Notable Books of 2010, writing, "Foner tackles what would seem an obvious topic, Lincoln and slavery, and sheds new light on it."

== Sources ==
- Foner, Eric (2010). The Fiery Trial: Abraham Lincoln and American Slavery. W. W. Norton. ISBN 978-0-393-06618-0.
