= The Sleepwalkers: How Europe Went to War in 1914 =

July Crisis book by Christopher Clark

- Author: Christopher Clark
- Language: English
- Publisher: Penguin Books
- Publication date: September 27, 2012
- Publication place: United Kingdom
- Pages: 697
- ISBN: 978-0-06-114665-7

The Sleepwalkers: How Europe Went to War in 1914 is a book by Australian historian Christopher Clark, first published in 2012. The book covers the causes of the First World War, starting in 1903 with the murder of Alexander I of Serbia and ending with the outbreak of World War One. In The Sleepwalkers, Clark argues that no sole country is to blame for starting the First World War, rather, each country unwittingly stumbled into it. This is contrary to the conventional theory, the Fischer thesis, which argues that Germany bore the main responsibility for the war.

== Publication ==
The book was first published in Britain on September 27, 2012 under the title The Sleepwalkers: How Europe Went to War in 1914 by Allen Lane. A German edition was later published in September 2013, where it sold more than 350,000 copies.

== Summary ==
Based on the situation in the Balkans, the book presents the conflicts and alliances that determined European politics at the beginning of the 20th century. The content is divided into three parts, with a general introduction and a conclusion:

- Part One, titled Roads to Sarajevo, describes the local events and alliances in the Balkans up to the fatal Sarajevo assassination, beginning with the regicide in Belgrade in 1903.
- Part Two, titled One Continent Divided, is devoted to the domestic, foreign, security and alliance policies of the major European powers from 1887 to 1914. In particular, Clark details how two alliance blocs formed in Europe and what goals the individual diplomats, head of states and staff of the ‘smaller players’ had.
- Part Three, titled Crisis, begins with the Sarajevo assassination and covers the events of the July Crisis, up to the start of the First World War.

Clark's final thesis is that the beginning of the war was the result of a chain of decisions made by different actors, which were by no means inevitable. The title of the book, The Sleepwalkers, corresponds to this:

In this sense, the protagonists of 1914 were sleepwalkers, watchful but unseeing, haunted by dreams, yet blind to the reality of the horror they were about to bring into the world.

== Key arguments ==
Clark refocused the origins back to the Balkans and sought to redistribute agency back to the diplomats. He assigned responsibility to all of the Great Powers, paying particular attention to Germany, Austria-Hungary, France and Russia. Clark argues that the Germanic powers sought a localised war to punish Serbia, but in doing so knowingly risked war with Russia. For its part Russia accepted the risk of war by upsetting the balance of power in the Balkans in 1912-13, encouraging anti-Austrian irredentism, and deciding to support Serbia come what may. France did not restrain Russia, positively encouraging her to face down the Germans and support Serbia in 1914. Clark concludes that while all the continental powers risked a general war, none sought that war.

Clark notes the speed of the crisis rendered diplomacy futile: "German efforts at mediation – which suggested that Austria should "Halt in Belgrade" and use the occupation of the Serbian capital to ensure its terms were met – were rendered futile by the speed of Russian preparations, which threatened to force the Germans to take counter–measures before mediation could begin to take effect".

Furthermore, while Clark does not seek to place responsibility on Russia alone, he places more emphasis on Russian actions than many previous historians, stating: "Yes, the Germans declared war on Russia before the Russians declared war on Germany. But by the time that happened, the Russian government had been moving troops and equipment to the German front for a week. The Russians were the first great power to issue an order of general mobilisation and the first Russo-German clash took place on German, not on Russian soil, following the Russian invasion of East Prussia. That doesn't mean that the Russians should be 'blamed' for the outbreak of war. Rather it alerts us to the complexity of the events that brought war about and the limitations of any thesis that focuses on the culpability of one actor."

The book challenges the imputation, hitherto widely accepted by mainstream scholars since 1919, of a peculiar "war guilt" on the part of the German Empire, instead mapping carefully the complex mechanism of events and misjudgements that led to war. There was, in 1914, nothing inevitable about it. Risks inherent in the strategies pursued by the various governments involved had been taken before without catastrophic consequences: this now enabled leaders to follow similar approaches while not adequately evaluating or recognising those risks. Among international experts many saw this presentation by Clark of his research and insights as groundbreaking.

== Reception ==
The book became an international bestseller upon release and is "arguably [Clark's] best-known book". The book received praise for its readability and analysis of sources, but criticism, particularly from within Germany, for its downplaying of Germany's role and disregard of some sources. It won the Los Angeles Times Book Prize for History and placed on the top ten list for The New York Times Book Review.

Clark was the keynote speaker at a March 2014 event organized by then-German foreign minister Frank-Walter Steinmeier. It has been suggested that The Sleepwalkers helped shape the German foreign policy paradigm for Eastern Europe for managing a resurgent Russia, and may thus have contributed to missing signals of the Kremlin's expansive intent in Ukraine.

=== Germany ===
In Germany, where the book received much critical attention, reactions were not all positive. Volker Ullrich contended that Clark's analysis largely disregards the pressure for war coming from Germany's powerful military establishment. According to Hans-Ulrich Wehler, Clark had diligently researched the sources covering the war's causes from the German side only to "eliminate [many of them] with bewildering one-sidedness" ("verblüffend einseitig eliminiert"). Warming to his theme, Wehler attributed the sales success of the book in Germany to a "deep seated need [on the part of German readers], no longer so constrained by the taboos characteristic of the later twentieth century, to free themselves from the burdensome allegations of national war guilt".

Annika Mombauer directly challenges Clark's "sleepwalker" thesis, rejecting his portrayal of July 1914 decision-makers as unaware or passive. She argues that Clark's framing leads to a problematic "relativization of responsibility" that obscures the conscious and deliberate decisions made in Berlin and Vienna to pursue war rather than diplomacy. While acknowledging that multiple governments contributed to the crisis, Mombauer emphasizes that the principal impetus for war came from Austria-Hungary and Germany, and insists on the importance of recognizing degrees of responsibility.

=== Vernon Bogdanor ===
Vernon Bogdanor has criticized Clark for downplaying the German and Austrian refusal of offers of mediation. Over the course of the July Crisis Sir Edward Grey, British Foreign Secretary, offered a four-power conference of the Great Powers to help mediate the conflict. Clark dismisses Grey's attempts as "half-hearted" and founded on a "partisan indifference to the power-political realities of Austro-Hungary's situation".

Russia accepted the four power conference proposal but Austria-Hungary rejected the proposal. Germany also rejected the proposal on the grounds that they believed only Germany would support their ally. Bogdanor believes the Germans were mistaken. "That's mistaken. I think Grey would have taken the Austrian side and would have said concessions were needed by Serbia to keep the peace…and it would have been very difficult for the Russians not to go along with that." The Russians further proposed that the conflict be subject to the court of arbitration in the Hague but this too was rejected by Germany and Austria-Hungary. To Bogdanor the rejection of the options of the four power conference and the court of arbitration weigh heavily against Germany and Austria-Hungary when looking for the causes of the war.
