= Reconstruction: America's Unfinished Revolution, 1863–1877 =

Historical non-fiction book by Eric Foner

Reconstruction: America's Unfinished Revolution, 1863-1877
- Author: Eric Foner (b. 1943)
- Language: English
- Genre: History
- Published: 1st Edition: 1988 (Harper & Row) (English) Updated Edition: December 2, 2014 (Harper Perennial Modern Classics) (English) Audiobook: 1990, (Blackstone Audio) (English)
- Publication place: United States
- Media type: hardcover, paperback, e-book, audiobook
- Pages: 690
- ISBN: 006091453X

Reconstruction: America's Unfinished Revolution, 1863–1877 is a historical non-fiction monograph written by American historian Eric Foner. Its broad focus is the Reconstruction Era in the aftermath of the American Civil War, which consists of the social, political, economic, and cultural changes brought about as consequences of the war's outcome. The author addresses, criticizes, and integrates several historical perspectives of the Civil War that first appeared during Reconstruction, such as the reconciliationist, white supremacist, and abolitionist perspectives, into a single cohesive academic narrative based on primary sources, such as newspaper quotations and interviews with Americans who lived through the era, as well as secondary sources, such as other texts written on the subject.

The author divides the primary topic of the Reconstruction Era into several subcategories, addressing them individually throughout the text while also integrating them into a larger context. Such subtopics addressed by the book include the gradual abolition of race-based chattel slavery, the gradual emancipation of the previously enslaved, the Reconstruction Amendments, the integration of the previously enslaved into the post-war society, the continuation of Manifest Destiny, the development of new White Supremacist ideologies and groups in both the North and the South, racist pogroms and massacres carried out against the freedmen by former confederates, police, state officials, and vigilantes, the relationship of the newly freedmen to the previously free men, the relationship of freedmen to their former masters, the ascendancy of America's industrial bourgeoisie after emancipation, the dissolution of the wealth and power of the semi-feudal Southern slave aristocracy, the re-integration of Confederate states into the Union, the erection of legal frameworks to elaborate upon and reinforce emancipation, such as the Freedmen's Bureau, the development of systems of education for freed slaves, black male suffrage, the reuniting of African American families separated by slavery, the relationship of newly freed African Americans to the political economy, the appearance of state-sanctioned segregation, regional differences in how Reconstruction was handled, and attempts by freedmen to achieve subsistence and political independence outside the dual frameworks of Northern paternalism and Southern attempts to restore the old order.

== Research and composition ==
Eric Foner stated, in a telephone interview in 1988, that was quoted in William S. McFeely's New York Times review of the book, that he had unearthed previously unused primary sources for the book from state governors' papers. He said "I found letters from ordinary people received by governors in a half-dozen Southern states [...] Ten years ago, when I began, I was a visiting professor at the University of South Carolina. The governors' papers there alone consisted of 121 boxes. The letters told me what was going on in people's minds because they came from all classes – former slaves, members of the Ku Klux Klan, white farmers, black leaders. They went to the grass roots of life." Foner stated that he did not apply much statistical analysis when researching the book, noting "Mine isn't statistical but analytical history. I didn't use computers because great issues are not susceptible to analysis by the numbers." The book's extensive bibliography is broken down by chapter.

== Synopsis and themes ==
The book is divided into a preface, twelve main chapters, and an epilogue. The book begins by addressing the last two years of the Civil War, and how it laid the groundwork for Reconstruction. The Emancipation Proclamation, its consequences, how it was enforced during the war, the New York Draft Riots, Lincoln's Assassination, the integration of former slaves into the Union Army, General Sherman's unfulfilled promises to the liberated slaves of Savannah, and the surrender of the South are all addressed during this early part of the book. Once the framework is established, the author moves on to the ambiguities of free labor, wage labor, and slave labor, the migration of working-class populations of all races, the failures of Presidential Reconstruction under Lincoln's successor Andrew Johnson, the making of Radical Reconstruction, and early Republican attempts to win votes from the South, after the war. In the final chapters of the book, Foner addresses the political and economic dimensions of Reconstruction, the challenge of the enforcement of new laws, the legal ambiguities of the post-war South and the American frontier, the reconstruction of the North, the politics of economic downturns throughout reconstruction, and the unfinished ideological projects of reconstruction. The author concludes that the laws, amendments and changing social attitudes of the Reconstruction Era constituted an incomplete social revolution in the United States, and that this unfinished revolution both created the necessity for future political movements and laid the groundwork for the Civil Rights Era nearly a century later, and that the institutions created or consolidated after the Civil War, such as the African American family, school, and church, provided a legal and cultural basis from which the modern civil rights movement would later be able to spring, as well as various economic populist movements, such trade unions, activist coalitions, political action committees, and political parties. Foner also concludes that the failure to redistribute the lands of the former plantation owners to the slaves constituted not only a moral failure to provide the former slaves the means of agricultural subsistence, but that it also constituted a deliberate attempt to force a Northern conception of industrial capitalism and free labor onto the South.

== Reception and academic significance ==
Reviewing for The New York Times in 1988, William S. McFeely said of the book that "[Foner's] synthesis is the product not only of a dauntingly thorough reading of this large body of literature, but also of his own extensive research. The result is a compelling narrative that begins during the Civil War as slaves sought freedom by escaping from their pursuing masters and coming into Union Army camps."

Reviewing for the Los Angeles Times in 1989, Gary Nash said of the book: "Eric Foner’s long, brilliant and stylish book [...] is of signal importance, not only to understanding one of the most controversial periods in American history but to comprehending the course of race relations in this country during the last century."

Writing for the London Review of Books in 1990, J. R. Pole said of the book: "Earlier interpretations of the history of Reconstruction by [Kenneth Milton] Stampp and [John Hope] Franklin did much to lay down guidelines for the ‘Second Reconstruction’ school, whose approach reflected the mood of the modern civil rights movement: but Foner has brought under control an enormously greater mass of information."

== Awards and nominations ==
The book won the 1988 Los Angeles Times Book Prize for History and the 1989 Bancroft Prize.

== Adaptations ==
In 1990, Eric Foner abridged the work from 690 pages to 320 pages in A Short History of Reconstruction. In the same year, Blackstone Audio released an audiobook of the work narrated by Norman Dietz. In 2014, Harper Perennial Modern Classics released an updated edition.
