= David Haward Bain =

American writer

David Haward Bain (born February 23, 1949) is an American writer of nonfiction, a lecturer, an editor, and was a longtime instructor in literature and creative writing at Middlebury College. Bain has been affiliated with the Bread Loaf Writers' Conference since 1980. Bain is primarily known for his work of narrative history, Empire Express: Building the First Transcontinental Railroad; a historical travel memoir, The Old Iron Road: An Epic of Roads, Rails, and the Urge to Go West; and an earlier braided historical/travel work, Sitting In Darkness: Americans in the Philippines. He is a fellow in the Society of American Historians.

== Work overview ==
External videos
- Booknotes interview with David Haward Bain on Empire Express, March 5, 2000, C-SPAN
- Presentation by Bain on The Old Iron Road, May 19, 2004, C-SPAN

Empire Express: Building the First Transcontinental Railroad has been reviewed positively by New York Times Book Review and was an "Editors' Choice", Wall Street Journal, Washington Post Book World, Chicago Tribune, Kirkus Reviews, Denver Post, San Francisco Chronicle, and Hartford Courant. It has been named A New York Times Notable Book (2000); one of Library Journal Best Books 1999; Main Selection, Book of the Month Club, History Book Club; Finalist, Los Angeles Times Book Award; Finalist, Francis Parkman Prize; National Railway & Locomotive History Society Award; New England Historical Association Book Award; The American Experience: Transcontinental Railroad documentary, PBS.

The Old Iron Road: An Epic of Rails, Roads, and the Urge to Go West has been reviewed positively by Los Angeles Times, Verlyn Klinkenborg of the New York Times Book Review, Chicago Tribune, Portland Oregonian, and Library Journal. It was named a Book Sense Travel Literature Bestseller by the American Booksellers Association.

Sitting In Darkness: Americans in the Philippines has been reviewed positively by New York Times Book Review, Publishers Weekly, Library Journal, Newsday Philadelphia Inquirer, and was in the Inquirer's "Editor's Best Books of 1984". It was awarded a Robert F. Kennedy Memorial Book Award, 1985.

Bitter Waters: America's Forgotten Naval Exploring Mission to the Dead Sea, 1848 has been reviewed positively by American Library Association Booklist, Roanoke VA Times, History Book Club, and Kirkus Reviews.

== Early life ==
Bain was born in Camden, New Jersey, last home of Walt Whitman (Bain wrote about it in a long-form essay, "Camden Bound: Going Home After a Lifetime of Absence.") His parents were David Bain, a sales manager for RCA (Radio Corporation of America), and Rosemary Haward Bain, who formerly worked in radio in Kansas City. He was the oldest of four children and was raised in Haddonfield and Westmont, New Jersey; Takoma Park and Chevy Chase, Maryland; and finally in Port Washington, Long Island, New York. Bain graduated from Boston University in 1971, majoring in journalism and political science and writing for three campus newspapers. He received a Hearst Award for Excellence in Newswriting on the topic of anti-war protests in the Vietnam era.

== Work history ==
In 1973 in New York City, Bain began working in the editorial departments of several book publishers, including Alfred A. Knopf (during the early Robert Gottlieb years), Stonehill, Crown Publishers/Harmony Books (when it was still a downtown family business), and Houghton Mifflin (New York), as well as doing projects at Macmillan Inc. and other firms and on staff at the first American Book Awards. Among the writers with whom he worked in these apprentice years were Alistair Cooke (America), Richard Kluger (Simple Justice), Robert Caro (The Power Broker), Jonathan Spence (Emperor of China), Martin Amis (The Rachel Papers), Shere Hite (The Hite Report), and Carolyn Heilbrun (Lady Ottoline's Album).

== Writing career ==
Bain became a full-time writer in 1978, beginning his first book, Aftershocks, and thereupon contributing many articles and reviews to The New York Times, the New York Times Book Review (to date, 32 reviews), Newsday (15), the Philadelphia Inquirer (22), Washington Post Book World, Los Angeles Times Book Review, and articles and essays in Smithsonian, American Heritage, TV Guide, Glamour, Kenyon Review, Prairie Schooner, and a number of travel magazines.

=== Books ===
Forbidden City: Family Secrets, Covert Love, and a Mysterious Death and Cover-Up, Peking, 1940. Forthcoming.

Big Payoff: The Kidnapping of Mary McElroy: A Kansas City Chronicle of Greed, Corruption, and the Power of Love in the Great American Depression. Forthcoming.

The Girl Widow Unveiled: Unraveling Dark Secrets in an American Family, longform personal/historical essay, Ebook, BookBaby, released under colophon of Gideon Abbey Press, 2013.

Mighty Good Road: Writings on Railroads, the West, and American History, ebook. Thirty-seven essays, talks, and reviews. Ebook, all platforms, released under colophon of Gideon Abbey Press, 2011.

Camden Bound: Going Home After a Lifetime of Absence, long-form stand-alone essay. Ebook, all platforms, released under colophon of Gideon Abbey Press, 2011.

Bitter Waters: America's Forgotten Naval Mission to the Dead Sea, 1848 (Overlook Press, 2011; ebook, 2012).

The Old Iron Road: An Epic of Rails, Roads, and the Urge to Go West (Viking Press, 2004; Penguin, 2005; Bison Books of Univ. Neb. Press, 2022; ebook, 2022).

Empire Express: Building the First Transcontinental Railroad (Viking Press, 1999; Penguin, 2000; ebook, 2010).

The College on the Hill: A Browser's History for the Bicentennial, Middlebury College Press (cloth), October 1999.

Whose Woods These Are: The Bread Loaf Writers' Conference, 1926–1992 (The Ecco Press, 1993).

Sitting In Darkness: Americans in the Philippines (Houghton Mifflin, 1984; Penguin, with new material, 1986; Ebook, with newer material, 2013, BookBaby under colophon of Gideon Abbey Press). Received a Robert F. Kennedy Memorial Book Prize, 1985.

Aftershocks: A Tale of Two Victims (Methuen, 1980; Penguin, with new material, 1986).

=== Selected essays ===
"From Wasatch to Green Mountains: Tracking Bernard DeVoto, Teacher/Historian," in William Thomas Allison and Susan Jipson Matt, Dreams, Myths & Reality: Utah and the American West: the Critchlow Lectures at Weber State University, Signature Books, 2008.

"Camden Bound: Going Home After a Lifetime of Absence." Personal/literary essay about Camden, NJ. (Walt Whitman death place; present author's birthplace). Prairie Schooner, Fall 1998. Selected for The Best of Prairie Schooner Essays (ed. Raz & Flaherty), U. Nebraska Press, 2000. Ebook, released under colophon of Gideon Abbey Press, 2013.

"The House on Hemenway Hill," essay, Prairie Schooner, Winter 1996. Reader's Choice Award, 1997. Among year's top 100 essays selected by series editor Robert Atwan for consideration in The Best American Essays 1997.

"A House and a Household: Sinclair Lewis and Dorothy Thompson," Kenyon Review, Summer 1989. Reprinted in Pack and Parini (eds.), The Bread Loaf Anthology of Contemporary American Essays, University Press of New England, 1989.

"Augusto Sandino: The Man Who Made the Yanquis Go Home," American Heritage, August–September 1985. Reprinted in Andrew C. Kimmens (ed.), Nicaragua and the United States, H.W. Wilson, 1987. Reprinted in Bain, Mighty Good Road: Writings on Railroads, the West, and American History, 2011 ebook.

"Joseph Battell," chapter in A History of Ripton, Vermont: The Story of a Green Mountain Town, 1781–1981, by Charles A. Billings. Niche Arts, 2019.

Series of 5 "place" essays in Middlebury Magazine, 2012–2013, 2018. "The Observer: Inside the Halls of Science," Middlebury Magazine, Summer 2012; "The Observer: Middlebury Institute for International Studies at Monterey," Middlebury Magazine, Fall 2012; "The Observer: Davis Library," Middlebury Magazine, Winter 2013; "The Observer: Mahaney Arts Center," Middlebury Magazine, Spring 2013; "The Observer: Gamaliel Painter Hall," MiddWire, Fall 2018.

"Frost at Bread Loaf," Burlington Free Press, June 29, 2012.

"Letter From Manila: How the Press Helped to Dump a Despot," Columbia Journalism Review, May–June 1986. COVER.

"Frederick Funston: The Acerbic Warrior," Smithsonian Magazine, May 1989.

=== Selected authored reviews ===
"Appetite for America: How Visionary Businessman Fred Harvey Built a Railroad Hospitality Empire That Civilized the Wild West" (Stephen Fried), review, Philadelphia Inquirer, January 2010.

"American Massacre: The Tragedy of Mountain Meadows (Sally Denton)," review, New York Times Book Review, September 27, 2003.

"Zephyr: Tracking a Dream Across America (Henry Kisor)," review, New York Times Book Review, 20 March 1994.

"The Civil War in the American West (Alvin M. Josephy, Jr.)," review, New York Times Book Review, 8 March 1992.

"In Our Own Image: America's Empire in the Philippines (Stanley Karnow)," review, Philadelphia Inquirer, March 1989.

"Blowback: America's Recruitment of Nazis and Its Effect on the Cold War (Christopher Simpson)," review, Newsday, May 1988.

"Union Pacific: Birth of a Railroad (Maury Klein), Philadelphia Inquirer, 27 December 1987.

"Waltzing With a Dictator: The Marcoses and the Making of American Policy (Raymond Bonner)," review, Newsday, 17 May 1987.

"Corazon Aquino (Lucy Komisar)," review, Los Angeles Times Book Review, 10 May 1987.

"War Without Mercy: Race and Power in the Pacific War (Fred Dower)," review, Philadelphia Inquirer, 13 July 1986.

"The Good War: An Oral History of World War Two (Studs Terkel)," review, Philadelphia Inquirer, 21 October 1984.

"The Spanish War: An American Epic, 1898 (G. O'Toole)," review, St. Petersburg Times, 21 October 1984.

"Endless Enemies: The Making of an Unfriendly World (Jonathan Kwitny)," review, Philadelphia Inquirer, 7 October 1984.

"The Passionate War: Narrative History of the Spanish Civil War (Peter Wyden)," review, Philadelphia Inquirer, 17 July 1983.

"Widows (Ariel Dorfman)," review, Philadelphia Inquirer, 10 July 1983.

== Teaching career ==
Following his fellowship year (1980) at Middlebury College's annual Bread Loaf Writers' Conference on its Ripton campus in the Green Mountains of Vermont, Bain was named to the conference faculty for ten subsequent years, thereafter serving terms on the admissions board and other committees; designated the Bread Loaf Historian in the mid-1980's, he has lectured annually at the conference for many years.

In 1987, Bain joined the faculty at Middlebury College in Vermont, with the Creative Writing Program in the English and American Literatures Department, as lecturer, part-time, and ultimately as senior lecturer, for 32 years. Also, he was an affiliate with the Environmental Studies Program. Bain retired in June 2019. His former students and advisees who have been publishing their own work include: Emma Cline, Justin Haythe, Jennifer Percy, David Philipps, Vendela Vida, David Gilbert, Lauren Markham, Dan O'Brien, Matthew Power, Emily Mitchell, Lewis Robinson, and T Cooper.

== Personal life ==
Bain married the painter Mary Smyth Duffy in 1981; she died in 2002; they had two children, one surviving (2023). He married Linda Fotheringill in 2021.
