= Joya Chatterji =

Indian academician

Joya Chatterji FBA FRAS FRHistS
- জয়া চ্যাটার্জি
- Born: 1964 (age 61–62); Delhi, India
- Occupation: Academic
- Children: 1

Academic background
- Education: Lady Shri Ram College; Trinity College
- Thesis: Communal politics and the partition of Bengal, 1932-1947

Academic work
- Notable works: Bengal Divided: Hindu Communalism and Partition, 1932-1947
- Website: Official Website

Joya Chatterji is Professor of South Asian History and a Fellow of Trinity College, Cambridge. She specialises in modern South Asian history and was the editor of the journal Modern Asian Studies for ten years.

== Early life and education ==
Chatterji gained a First Class Honours Degree in History from Lady Sri Ram College of the University of Delhi where she won the prize for Best Student of History, before completing a PhD in History at Trinity College, University of Cambridge in 1991. Her doctoral thesis was in "Communal politics and the partition of Bengal, 1932-1947".

== Career ==
After the publication of her first book in 1995, Bengal Divided, Chatterji won a 'prize' Junior Research Fellowship at Trinity College. After holding a Fellowship at Trinity, and Wolfson College Cambridge, she taught at the London School of Economics from 2000 to 2007. She then took up her post at the Faculty of History in Cambridge in 2007 and as Fellow of Trinity College Cambridge.

In 2014, Chatterji was elected to a personal chair as Professor of South Asian Studies at the University of Cambridge. Her research interests are listed as "Modern South Asian history; imperial and world history; partitions and borders; refugees, migration and diaspora; mobility and immobility; citizenship and minority formation in the late 20th century", and she has supervised some 30 doctoral theses in these and cognate areas. She taught courses on South Asian and world history at undergraduate and postgraduate levels, her courses including "The History of the Indian subcontinent from the late eighteenth century to the present day" and "World History since 1914". From 2014 to her retirement in 2019, she was Director of the Centre of South Asian Studies at Cambridge.

From 2009-2021 she was first Editor then Editor-in-chief of Modern Asian Studies, a leading journal in the field. She also has served on the editorial boards of The Historical Journal, Journal of Contemporary History and Economic and Political Weekly.

=== Public impact ===
Chatterji played a prominent role in promoting the study of South Asia at Cambridge as Director of the University's Centre of South Asian Studies, as well as playing a significant part in the promotion of public history. A key focus has been to promote the teaching of migration to Britain to school children across the UK.

Chatterji worked with Dr Claire Alexander and Dr Annu Jalais on the Bangla Stories project, playing a leading role in curating the Freedom and Fragmentation Exhibition, which displayed rare photographs and provided an intimate view of India's partition uprooted in the largest mass migration in human history. These projects have had an impact upon school pupils, teachers, curators, archivists, photographers, and the public in the UK and India, encouraging them to reflect upon the history of migration and how it has shaped society today. She and Claire Alexander then led, along with the Runnymede Trust, the award-winning Our Migration Story website, which enabled teaching across the curriculum of migration to Britain since the dawn of the millennium.

=== Accolades ===
Chatterji was elected a Fellow of the British Academy in 2018, and is also a Fellow of the Royal Asiatic Society (2013) and of the Royal Historical Society (2017).

She is a joint awardee of the Royal Historical Society's Award for Public History (2018) and The Guardian University Award for Research Impact (2019) for Our Migration Story. She has twice received public recognition as a 'Woman of Achievement' from the University of Cambridge.

Her book Shadows At Noon: The South Asian Twentieth Century was longlisted for the Women's Prize for Non-Fiction (2024), shortlisted for the Cundill History Prize, and won the 2024 Los Angeles Times Book Prize for History, and the £50,000 Wolfson History Prize 2024, the most valuable history writing prize in the UK.

== Personal life ==
Chatterji was born and brought up in Delhi, India. She has one son born in 1991. She brought him up as a single parent from 1997. For medical reasons she retired from the Faculty of History in 2019, but remains a fellow of Trinity College.

== Publications ==
=== Books ===
- Chatterji, Joya (1994). Bengal Divided: Hindu Communalism and Partition, 1932-1947. Cambridge University Press. doi:10.1017/CBO9780511563256. ISBN 9780521523288.
- Chatterji, Joya (2007). The Spoils of Partition: Bengal and India, 1947–1967. Cambridge University Press. doi:10.1017/CBO9780511497384. ISBN 9780521875363.
- চট্টোপাধ্যায়, জয়া (2014). বাঙলা ভাগ হল হিন্দু সাম্প্রদায়িকতা ও দেশ-বিভাগ, ১৯৩২-১৯৪৭. University Press Limited. ISBN 9789840502660.
- চ্যাটার্জি, জয়া (2016). দেশভাগের অর্জন : বাঙলা ও ভারত, ১৯৪৭-১৯৬৭ (1st ed.). Mowla Brothers.
- Chatterji, Joya; Washbrook, David (2013). Routledge Handbook of the South Asian Diaspora (1st ed.). London: Taylor & Francis. doi:10.4324/9780203796528. ISBN 9780415480109.
- Alexander, Claire; Chatterji, Joya; Jalais, Annu (2015). The Bengal Diaspora: Rethinking Muslim migration (1st ed.). London: Taylor & Francis. doi:10.4324/9781315660066. ISBN 9780415530736.
- Chatterji, Joya (2019). Partitions Legacies. Permanent Black. doi:10.2307/jj.18255068. ISBN 978-8178245393.
- Chatterji, Joya (2023). Shadows at Noon: The South Asian Twentieth Century. The Bodley Head. ISBN 9781847925497.

=== Articles ===
- 'Secularization and "Constitutive Moments": insights from Partition Diplomacy in South Asia', in Humeira Iqtidar and Tanika Sarkar (eds.), Secularization and Tolerance in South Asia, Cambridge: Cambridge University Press, 2018.
- 'Decolonisation in South Asia: the long view', in Martin Thomas and Andrew Thompson (eds), Oxford Handbook of the Ends of Empire, (Oxford University Press, 2018.)
- 'Gandhi, Princes and Subjects. Alternatives to Citizenship at the End of Empire', in Naren Nanda (ed.), Gandhi's Moral Politics, (2017.)
- 'Rejoinder': Journal of Ethnic and Racial Studies symposium on the Bengal Diaspora; Journal of Ethnic and Racial Studies, Volume 40, 2017.
- 'Introduction' (with Prasannan Parthasarathi), Modern Asian Studies (Special Issue: 'New Directions in Social and Economic History') 51.2, 2017.
- 'On being Stuck in the Bengal Delta: Immobility on the "Age of Migration"', Modern Asian Studies (Special Issue: 'New Directions in Social and Economic History') Vol. 51.2, March 2017.
- 'Partition Studies: Potential and Pitfalls', The Journal of Asian Studies Vol. 73, No. 2 (May) 2014.
- 'Secularisation and Partition Emergencies', Economic and Political Weekly, December 2013.
- 'Dispositions and Destinations. "Mobility Capital" and Migration in the Bengal delta', Comparative Studies in Society and History, Vol. 55 Issue 02, 2013.
- 'Introduction' in J. Chatterji and D. Washbrook (eds) The Handbook of the South Asian Diaspora, (London: Routledge, 2013), pp. 1–9.
- 'From subject to citizen: Rethinking the "post-colonial" immigration order', in J. Chatterji and D. Washbrook (eds) The Handbook of the South Asian Diaspora, (London: Routledge, 2013), pp. 189–196.
- 'Nationalisms in India, 1857-1947', in John Breuilly (ed.) Oxford Handbook of Nationalisms, (Oxford: Oxford University Press 2013, pp. 242–262.
- 'South Asian Histories of Citizenship', Historical Journal, December 2012, Vol. 55.
- 'From subjecthood to citizenship. Migration, nationality and the post-imperial global order,' in Alfred McCoy and Stephen Jacobson (ed.), Endless Empires (Madison: Wisconsin University Press), 2012, pp. 306–317.
- 'Migration myths and the mechanics of assimilation. Two community histories from Bengal', Studies in the Humanities and the Social Sciences, XVII, Numbers 1 and 2, 2010.
- 'New directions in partition studies', History Workshop Journal, March 2009.
- '"Dispersal" and the failure of rehabilitation. Refugee camp-dwellers and squatters in West Bengal', Modern Asian Studies, Vol. 41, Issue 5, 2007.
- 'The history of a frontier', Sephis, (web magazine) 3, 3, 2007.
- 'Of graveyards and ghettos. Muslims in West Bengal, 1947-67', in Mushirul Hasan and Asim Roy (eds.), Living together separately. Cultural India in history and politics, (Delhi: Oxford University Press), 2005, pp. 222–250, 29 pp.
- 'Nehru's legacy', Reviews in History, (web magazine) December 2004.
- 'Writing about partition', Studies in History, 18, 1, 2002, 12 pp.
- 'Rights or charity? Government and refugees: the debate over relief and rehabilitation in West Bengal, 1947-1950';, in Suvir Kaul (ed.), Partitions of memory, (Delhi: Permanent Black Press, 2001), pp. 74–110, 37 pp.
- 'The decline, revival and fall of bhadralok influence in the nineteen-forties', in Sekhar Bandyopadhyay (ed.), Bengal: rethinking history. Essays on historiography, (Delhi: Manohar Publishers), 2001, pp. 297–315, 19 pp.
- 'The Bengali Muslim; a contradiction in terms?'; Comparative Studies of South Asia, Africa and the Middle East, Vol. XVI, 2, 1999.
- 'The fashioning of a frontier: the Radcliffe line and Bengal's border landscape, 1947-1952', Modern Asian Studies, Vol. 33, Issue I, 1999.
- 'The making of a borderline', in Ian Talbot and Gurharpal Singh (eds.), Region and partition, (Delhi: Oxford University Press), 1999, 168-202, 31 pp.
- 'The Bengali Muslim', in Mushirul Hasan (ed.), Islams, communities and the nation, (Delhi: Manohar Publishers), 205-219, 20 pp, 1998.
