= Wolfram Kaiser =

German academic

Wolfram Kaiser (born 1966) is a professor of European studies at University of Portsmouth and visiting professor at the College of Europe in Bruges.

Kaiser's areas of interest include the history and politics of the European Union and transnational dimensions of European and global history since the mid-nineteenth century.

== Monographs ==
- The European Ambition. The Group of the European People's Party and European Integration, Nomos (2020). ISBN 978-3-8487-6767-0 (with L. Bardi et al.).
- Shaping the European Union: The European Parliament and Institutional Reform, 1979-1989, European Parliament Research Service (2018). ISBN 978-92-846-3461-3
- Writing the Rules for Europe. Experts, Cartels, and International Organizations, Palgrave Macmillan (2014). ISBN 978-0-23030-807-7 (with J. Schot).
- Exhibiting Europe in Museums. Networks, Collections, Narratives, and Representations, Berghahn (2014). ISBN 978-1-78238-290-4 (with S. Krankenhagen and K. Poehls).
- Europa ausstellen. Das Museum als Praxisfeld der Europäisierung, Boehlau (2012). ISBN 978-3-412-20888-2 (with S. Krankenhagen and K. Poehls).
- Christian democracy and the origins of European Union, Cambridge University Press (2007). ISBN 978-0-521-88310-8.
- Using Europe, abusing the Europeans. Britain and European integration, 1945–63, Palgrave Macmillan (1999). ISBN 0-312-16350-9.

=== Books edited (sample) ===
- with J.-H. Meyer, Eds. (2017, paperback 2019). International Organizations and Environmental Protection. Conservation and Globalization in the 20th century. New York, Berghahn.Publisher's page.
- with J.-H. Meyer, Eds. (2013). Societal Actors in European Integration. Polity-Building and Policy-Making 1958–1992. Basingstoke, Palgrave Macmillan.
- with J.-H. Meyer, Eds. (2010). "Non-State Actors in European Integration in the 1970s: Towards a Polity of Transnational Contestation". Comparativ. Zeitschrift für Globalgeschichte und vergleichende Gesellschaftsforschung. Special Issue 10(3).
- with B. Leucht and M. Gehler, Eds. (2010). Transnational Networks in Regional Integration: Governing Europe 1945–83. Basingstoke, Palgrave Macmillan.
- with A. Varsori, Eds. (2010). European Union History. Themes and Debates. Palgrave, Basingstoke.
- Ed. (2009). "Networks in European Union Governance". In: Journal of Public Policy. Special Issue 29(2).
- with B. Leucht and M. Rasmussen, Eds. (2009). The History of the European Union. Origins of a Trans- and Supranational Polity 1950–72. Routledge, London.
- with Christopher Clark Eds. (2003) Culture Wars: Secular–Catholic conflict in Nineteenth-Century Europe. Cambridge, Cambridge University Press, 2003.
