= Christopher Clark =

Australian historian working in England

Sir Christopher Clark FBA
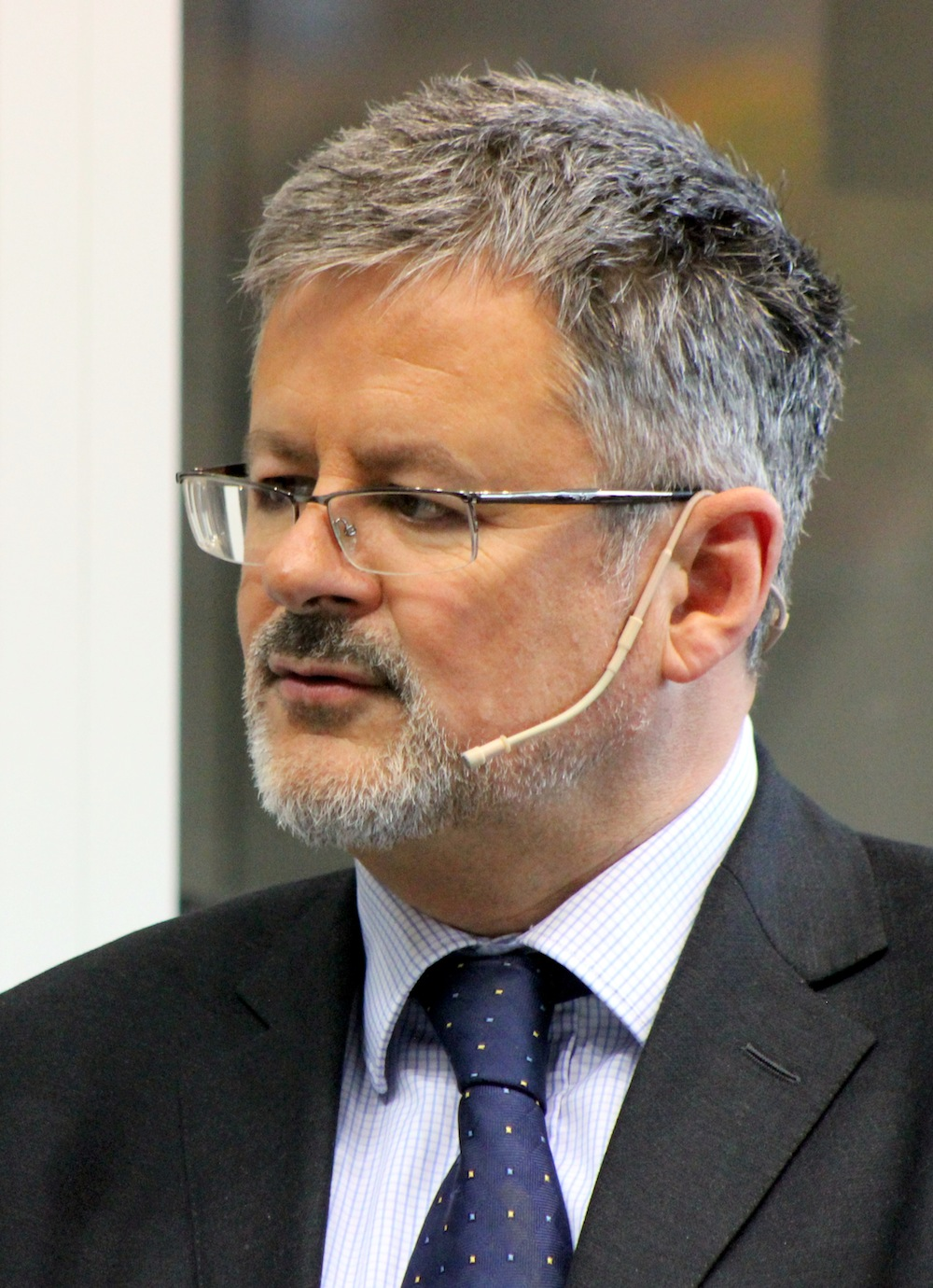
- Clark in 2013
- Born: Christopher Munro Clark; 14 March 1960 (age 66); Sydney, Australia
- Spouse: Nina Lübbren
- Children: 2
- Awards: Wolfson History Prize

Academic background
- Education: University of Sydney (B.A.); Free University of Berlin; Pembroke College, Cambridge (PhD)
- Thesis: Jewish mission in the Christian state: Protestant missions to the Jews in 18th- and 19th-century Prussia (1991)
- Doctoral advisor: Jonathan Steinberg

Academic work
- Institutions: St Catharine's College, Cambridge
- Website: Cambridge Faculty of History page

Sir Christopher Munro Clark (born 14 March 1960) is an Australian historian living in the United Kingdom and Germany. He is the twenty-second Regius Professor of History at the University of Cambridge. In the 2015 Birthday Honours, he was knighted for his services to Anglo-German relations.

== Education and academic positions ==
Clark was educated at Sydney Grammar School from 1972 to 1978, the University of Sydney (where he studied history) and the Freie Universität Berlin from 1985 to 1987.

Clark received his PhD at the University of Cambridge, having been a member of Pembroke College from 1987 to 1991. He is professor in modern European history at the University of Cambridge and, since 1991, has been a fellow of St Catharine's College, where he is currently Director of Studies in History.

In 2003, Clark was appointed lecturer in Modern European History and, in 2006, reader in Modern European History. His Cambridge University professorship in history followed in 2008.

In September 2014, he succeeded Richard J. Evans as Regius Professor of History at Cambridge. In the birthday honours of June 2015, Clark was knighted on the recommendation of the foreign secretary for his services to Anglo-German relations.

== Professional career ==
As Clark acknowledges in the foreword to Iron Kingdom, living in West Berlin between 1985 and 1987, during years that turned out to be among the last of the divided Germany, gave him an insight into German history and society.

=== Earlier work ===
Clark's academic focus started with the history of Prussia, with his earlier researches concentrating on Pietism and on Judaism in Prussia as well as the power struggle, known as the Kulturkampf, between Bismarck's Prussian state and the Catholic Church. His scope has since broadened to embrace more generally the competitive relationships between religious institutions and the state in modern Europe. He is the author of a study of Christian–Jewish relations in Prussia, The Politics of Conversion. Missionary Protestantism and the Jews in Prussia, 1728–1941.

=== Iron Kingdom: The Rise and Downfall of Prussia, 1600–1947 ===
Clark's best-selling history of Prussia, Iron Kingdom: The Rise and Downfall of Prussia, 1600–1947 won several prizes. Its critical reception gave him a profile beyond the academic world. The German-language version of the book, Preußen. Aufstieg und Niedergang 1600–1947, won Clark the 2010 German Historians' Prize, an award normally given to historians nearing the end of their careers. Clark remains (as of 2014) the youngest-ever recipient of the triennial prize and only winner who is not a mother-tongue German-speaker.

In 17 chapters covering 800 pages, Clark contends that Germany was "not the fulfillment of Prussia's destiny but its downfall". Although the 19th-century Kulturkampf was characterised by a peculiar intensity and radicalism, Clark's study of sources in different European languages enabled him to spell out how closely the Prussian experience of church-state rivalry resembled events elsewhere in Europe. In that way, the book rebuts the traditional Sonderweg view by which throughout the 20th century, mainstream historians placed great emphasis on the "differentness" of Germany's historical path before and during the 19th century. Clark downplays the perceived uniqueness of the reform agenda pursued by Prussia between 1815–48, and believes the political and economic significance of the German customs union, established in 1834, came to be discovered and then overstated by historians only retrospectively and in the light of much-later political developments.

=== Kaiser Wilhelm II ===
With his critical biography of the last German Kaiser, Kaiser Wilhelm II, Clark aims to offer correctives to many of the traditional positions presented in J. C. G. Röhl's three-volume biography of Wilhelm.

=== The Sleepwalkers: How Europe Went to War in 1914 ===
Clark's study of the outbreak of the First World War, The Sleepwalkers: How Europe Went to War in 1914, appeared in English in 2012; the German version (Die Schlafwandler: Wie Europa in den Ersten Weltkrieg zog) followed in 2013. The book challenges the imputation, which had been widely accepted by mainstream scholars since 1919, of a peculiar "war guilt" attached to the German Empire. He instead maps the complex mechanism of events and misjudgements that led to war. Risks inherent in the strategies pursued by the various governments involved had been taken before without catastrophic consequences, which now enabled leaders to follow similar approaches without adequately evaluating or recognising those risks. Among international experts, many saw the presentation by Clark of his research and insights as groundbreaking.

In Germany, where the book received much critical attention, not all reactions were positive. Volker Ullrich contended that Clark's analysis largely disregards the pressure for war coming from Germany's powerful military establishment. According to Hans-Ulrich Wehler, Clark had diligently researched the sources covering the war's causes from the German side only to "eliminate [many of them] with bewildering one-sidedness". Wehler attributed the sales success of the book in Germany to a "deep-seated need [on the part of German readers], no longer so constrained by the taboos characteristic of the later twentieth century, to free themselves from the burdensome allegations of national war guilt". However, Clark observes that the current German debate about the start of the war is obfuscated by its link to their moral repugnance at the Nazi era.

=== Other work ===
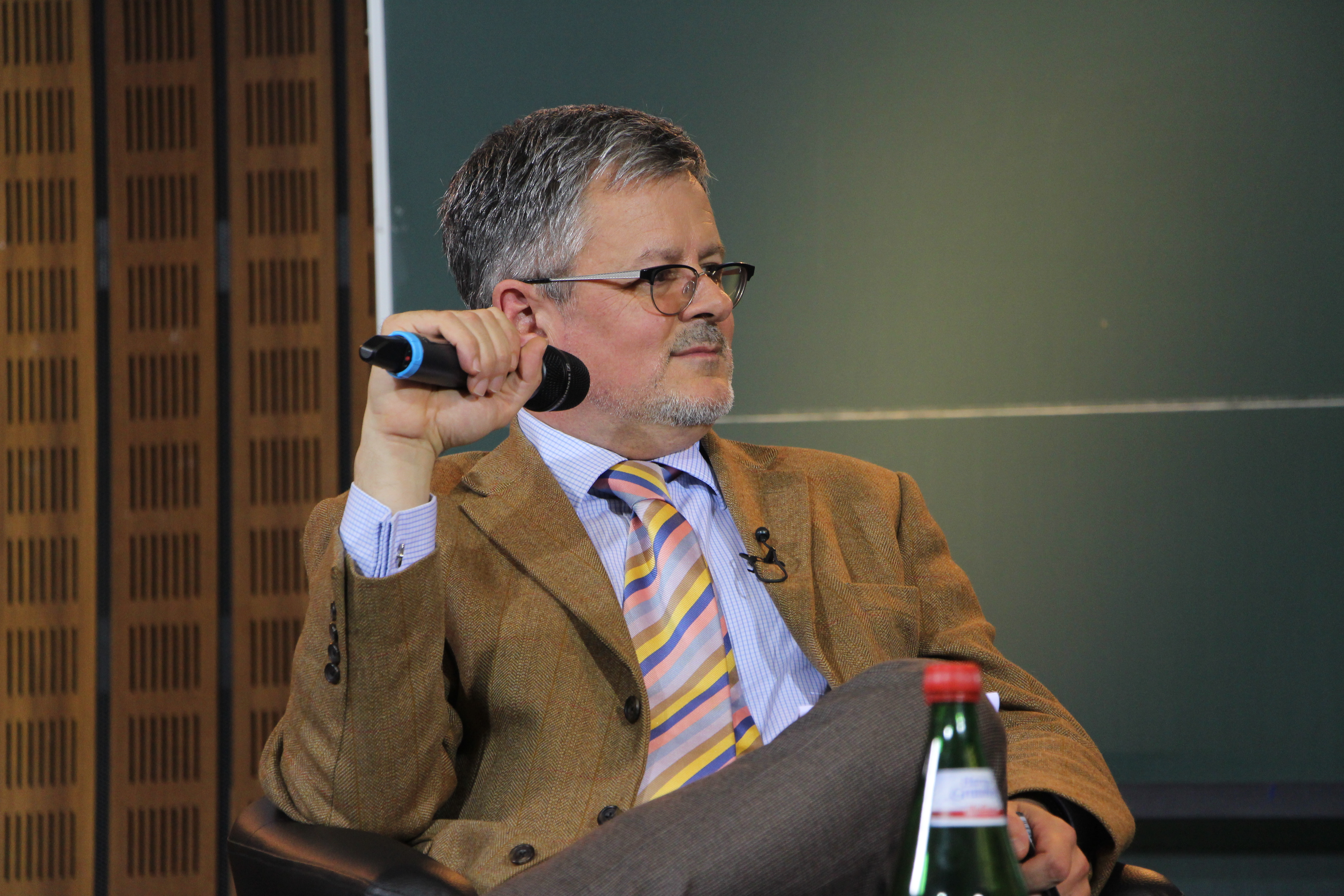
Clark at the 50th German Historians' Convention in Göttingen (2014)

Clark is the co-editor with Wolfram Kaiser of a transnational study of secular-clerical conflict in 19th-century Europe (Culture Wars. Catholic-Secular Conflict in Nineteenth-Century Europe, Cambridge: Cambridge University Press, 2003), and the author of numerous articles and essays. Clark presented the BBC Four documentary programme "Frederick the Great and the Enigma of Prussia". He also presented and narrated the 2017 ZDF documentary The Story of Europe.

Since 1998, Clark has been a series-editor of the scholarly book series New Studies in European History from Cambridge University Press. He is a Fellow of the Australian Academy of the Humanities and a prominent member of the Arbeitsgemeinschaft zur Preußischen Geschichte (en: Prussian History Working Group). Since 2009 he has been a member of the Preußische Historische Kommission [Prussian Historical Commission], and since 2010 a senior advisory (non-voting) member of the German Historical Institute London and of the Otto-von-Bismarck-Stiftung [Bismarck Foundation] in Friedrichsruh. In 2010, Clark was elected a member of the British Academy.

=== Historiography of Christopher Clark's Work ===
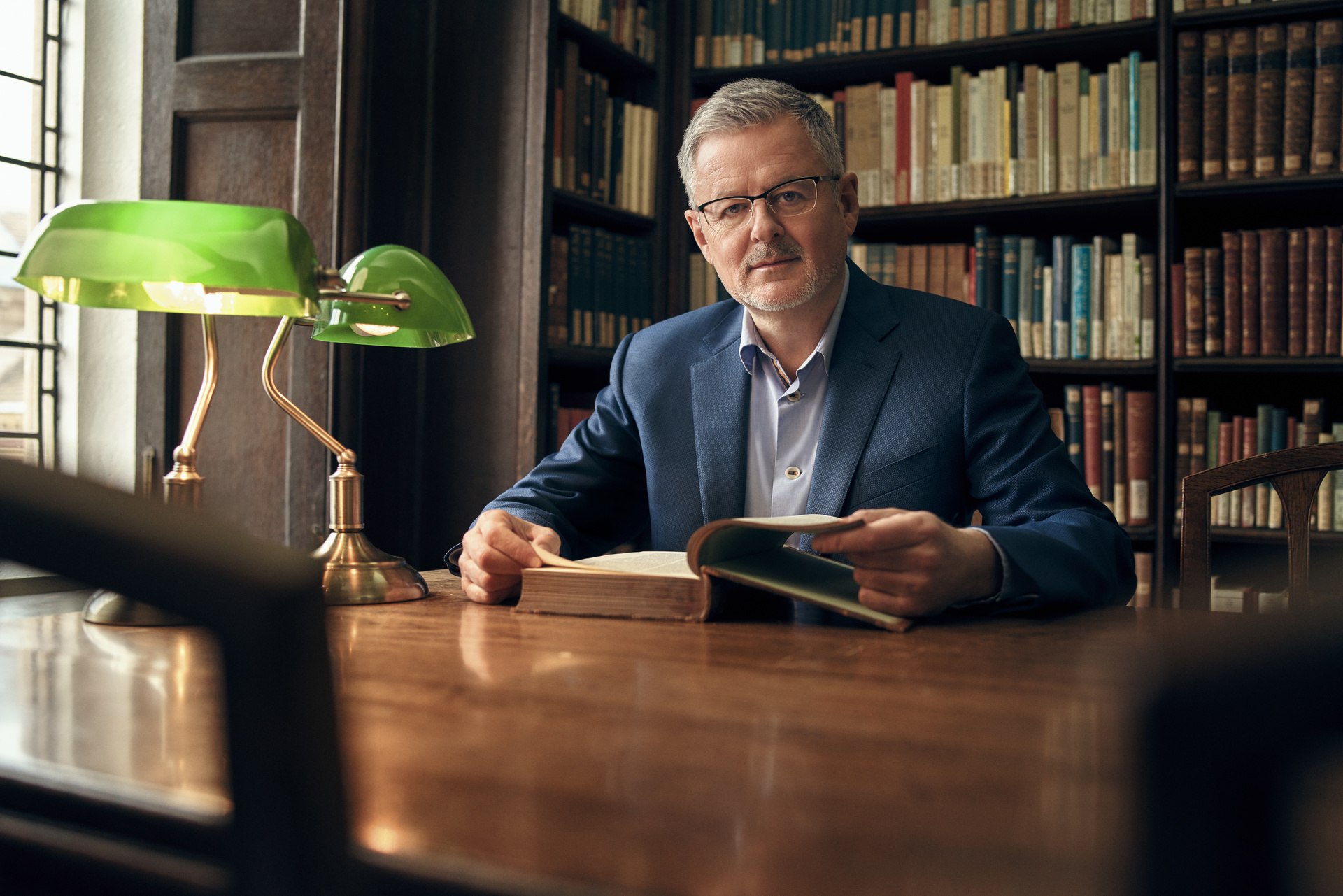
Clark in 2019

Clark work on German history is extensive, and notable for the breadth of the periods it encompasses and its particular interest in the emergence of German identity and the German state from Prussia. He has dealt consistently with the Prussian state and its complex relationship with Germany and German ethnic groups. In terms of the scope of his writing, he is notable for frequently drawing from several centuries of history in individual works.

His first book, The Politics of Conversion: Missionary Protestantism and the Jews in Prussia, 1728-1941 (1995) centered on the confluence of Pietism and Lutheran missionaries, and their attempts in Berlin and Königsberg to achieve the conversion of the Jews as part of broader efforts within the Prussian state to achieve national integration. Likewise, in Iron Kingdom: The Rise and Downfall of Prussia, 1600–1947 (2006) he covers the life of the Prussian state and its transformation into Wilhelmine Germany and subsequent downfall. In particular this work has been praised for its 'magisterial account runs to almost seven hundred pages of text and manages to build on the vast scholarship occasioned by the Preussenwelle [Prussian Wave] without drowning in it.' The Prussian Wave refers to the upsurge of interest in German popular culture and historiography in Prussian culture and the Prussian state. Likewise, in one of his best known works, The Sleepwalkers: How Europe Went to War in 1914 (2013) Clark switches breadth of period for geography and scope, arguing that the First World War was more the result of negligence and the inefficiencies of European diplomacy than any particular animosity between the sovereigns involved.

== Personal life ==
Clark and his former wife, Nina Lübbren, have two sons.

== Awards and decorations ==
- 2007 Wolfson History Prize awarded for Iron Kingdom: The Rise and Downfall of Prussia, 1600–1947
- 2007 H-Soz-u-Kult prize "Das historische Buch"
- 2007 Queensland Premier's Literary Awards, History Book Award for Iron Kingdom: The Rise and Downfall of Prussia, 1600–1947
- 2007 General History Prize, New South Wales Premier's History Awards, for Iron Kingdom: The Rise and Downfall of Prussia, 1600–1947
- 2010
  - In October 2010, Germany awarded Clark the Officer's Cross of the Order of Merit of the Federal Republic of Germany as his "research had contributed greatly to German-British relations". The honour was conferred by the German ambassador Georg Boomgaarden during a reception at his official London residence.
  - Another German award was bestowed on Clark for his book Preußen: Aufstieg und Niedergang 1600–1947 by German President Christian Wulff in November 2010. Chris Clark was the first foreigner to be awarded the German Historians' Prize [Deutscher Historikerpreis].
- 2013 Cundill Prize, finalist, for The Sleepwalkers: How Europe Went To War In 1914
- 2013 Los Angeles Times Book Prize (History), winner for The Sleepwalkers
- 2013 Hessell-Tiltman Prize, shortlist for The Sleepwalkers
- 2015 Laura Shannon Prize, for The Sleepwalkers
- 2015 Knight Bachelor
- 2018 European Prize for Political Culture
- 2019 Pour le Mérite for Sciences and Arts
- 2024 Doctorate of Letters (honoris causa), University of Sydney
- 2026 Ludwig Börne Prize

== Publications ==
- Clark, Christopher Munro (1991). Jewish mission in the Christian state: Protestant missions to the Jews in 18th- and 19th-century Prussia (PhD thesis). University of Cambridge. ISNI 0000000135530317. Archived from the original on 5 July 2023.

Books written

- Clark, Christopher M. (1995). The Politics of Conversion: Missionary Protestantism and the Jews in Prussia, 1728–1941. Oxford Clarendon Press & New York: Oxford University Press. ISBN 978-0-19-820456-5. LCCN 95154541.
- — (2000). Kaiser Wilhelm II: A Life in Power. Harlow, England, & New York: Longman. ISBN 978-0-582-24559-4. LCCN 00030939.
- — (2006). Iron Kingdom: The Rise and Downfall of Prussia, 1600–1947. Cambridge, Massachusetts: Belknap Press of Harvard University Press. ISBN 978-0-674-02385-7. LCCN 2006043076. Published in Germany as Preußen: Aufstieg und Niedergang 1600–1947 by Deutsche Verlags-Anstalt, 2007
- — (2012). The Sleepwalkers: How Europe Went to War in 1914. London: Allen Lane. ISBN 978-0-7139-9942-6. LCCN 2012515665.
- — (2019). Time and Power – Visions of History in German Politics, from the Thirty Years' War to the Third Reich. Princeton University Press. ISBN 978-0-691-18165-3.
- — (2021). Prisoners of Time – Prussians, Germans and Other Humans. Penguin. ISBN 978-0-14-199731-5.
- — (2023). Revolutionary Spring – Fighting for a New World 1848–1849. Penguin. ISBN 978-0-241-34766-9.
- — (2026). A Scandal in Königsberg. Penguin. ISBN 979-8-217-06094-8.

Books edited

- with Kaiser, Wolfram, eds. (2003). Culture Wars: Secular-Catholic Conflict in Nineteenth-Century Europe. Cambridge, UK & New York: Cambridge University Press. ISBN 978-0-521-80997-9. LCCN 2003273877.

Articles

- — (22 November 2018). "This Is a Reality, Not a Threat". The New York Review of Books (reviews of Lawrence Freedman, The Future of War: A History, and Robert H. Latiff, Future War: Preparing for the New Global Battlefield). LXV (18): 53–54.

Films

- — (2020). Planet of Treasures (as presenter). ZDF.

Academic offices
Preceded by Richard J. Evans	Cambridge Regius Professor of History; 2014–present	Incumbent
