= Maury Klein =

American historian

Maury Klein (born 14 March 1939 in Memphis, Tennessee) is an American historian and author of books on 19th-century American history and the American railroad industry.

== Life ==
Maurice Nickell (Maury) Klein was born March 14, 1939, in Memphis, Tennessee. His father, Harry Klein (Klajnzyngier), was the son of Polish immigrants and spent his life in the women's ready-wear trade. His mother, Alice Lena Nickell, was the daughter of a Louisville, Kentucky, physician, and sang professionally before her marriage. A nomadic childhood took him all over the country and aroused in him an interest in American history. In 1953 he landed in Denver, Colorado, where he graduated from East High School three years later. He earned a B.A. degree from Knox College in 1960 and went on to graduate work at Emory University, where he received an M.A. degree in 1961 and a Ph.D. in history in 1965. His dissertation, done under Professor Bell Irvin Wiley, was a biography of Confederate general Edward Porter Alexander.

Klein taught for a year at Emory before accepting a job at the University of Rhode Island in September 1964. He remained at that institution until his retirement in June 2008, teaching a wide variety of courses and writing on a diverse number of subjects. In 1973 he was promoted to full professor of history. More than once he said that, once decided on a teaching career, he majored in history because it gave him the most freedom of subject matter in the classroom and fed the broad range of his interests. He spent the year 1966-67 as a Newcomen Fellow at the Harvard Business School.

Throughout his career writing has remained Klein’s greatest passion. He is the author of 18 books, along with many articles in publications ranging from scholarly journals to Sports Illustrated, essays, book reviews, and, more recently, blogs. Railroad history emerged early as one of his specialties. Along with works on southern railroads he has published a three-volume history of the Union Pacific Railroad as well as biographies of two key figures in that company’s history, Jay Gould and E. H. Harriman. The Union Pacific series drew praise as the definitive history of that road. The Gould biography offered a revised and positive portrait of that long-reviled financier. The Railroad and Locomotive Historical Society twice awarded Klein its George and Constance Hilton prize for the outstanding book in railroad history.

These and other works earned Klein a reputation as one of America’s prominent business and railroad historians. Klein has also authored books on urban history, the coming of the Civil War, the stock market crash of 1929, the steam and electric revolutions, and has a forthcoming work on how America mobilized for World War II.

In college, Klein kindled a love of theater. While enjoying a career acting in university and other productions, he also served for four years as chairman of the University of Rhode Island’s theater department. He served as chairman of the faculty senate and headed the university’s Honors Program and arts council. Through the years, Klein has also provided consulting services and public speaking. In 2001, he received an honorary degree from Knox College, his alma mater. In 2011, he was inducted into the Rhode Island Heritage Hall of Fame.

== Works ==
In addition to his books, he has written several articles for professional journals and popular publications.

- 1968: "Southern railroad leaders, 1865-1893: identities and ideologies." Business History Review 42.3 (1968): 288-310.
- 1970: The Great Richmond Terminal
- 1972: A History of the Louisville & Nashville Railroad
- 1976: Prisoners of Progress: American Industrial Cities, 1850-1920 (along with Harvey A. Kantor)
- 1978: "In Search of Jay Gould." Business History Review 52.2 (1978): 166-199.
- 1986: The Life and Legend of Jay Gould (nominated for the Pulitzer Prize, Outstanding Book Award of the Railway and Locomotive Historical Society)
- 1987: Union Pacific: The Birth, 1862-1893 (Outstanding Book Award of the Railway & Locomotive Historical Society)
- 1990: Union Pacific: The Rebirth, 1894-1969
- 1990: "Competition and regulation: the railroad model." Business History Review 64.2 (1990): 311-325.
- 1990: "Replacement technology: the diesel as a case study." Railroad History 162 (1990): 109-120. online
- 1993: The Flowering of the Third America (nominated for the Pulitzer Prize)
- 1994: Unfinished Business: The Railroad in American Life
- 1997: Days of Defiance: Sumter, Secession, Slavery, and the Civil War
- 2000: The Life and Legend of EH Harriman (nominated for the Pulitzer Prize)
- 2001: "The stock market crash of 1929: A review article." Business History Review 75.2 (2001): 325-351.
- 2001: "Coming full circle: The study of big business since 1950." Enterprise & Society 2.3 (2001): 425-460.
- 2001: Rainbow's End: The Crash of 1929
- 2003: The change makers: from Carnegie to Gates, how the great entrepreneurs transformed ideas into industries
- 2007: The Genesis of Industrial America, 1870-1920
- 2008: The Power Makers
- 2011: Union Pacific: The Reconfiguration, America's Greatest Railroad from 1969 to the Present
- 2013: A Call to Arms: Mobilizing America for World War II
- 2016: Stealing Games: How John McGraw Transformed Baseball with the 1911 New York Giants.
- 2019: "Financing the Transcontinental Railroad." Gilder Lehrman Institute of American History, online
