= The Wages of Destruction =

2006 book by Adam Tooze

The Wages of Destruction: The Making and Breaking of the Nazi Economy
- First edition
- Author: Adam Tooze
- Language: English
- Subject: Nazi economy
- Genre: Economic history
- Publisher: Allen Lane; Viking Penguin
- Publication date: 29 June 2006
- Publication place: United Kingdom
- Pages: 799 pp
- ISBN: 978-0-7139-9566-4
- OCLC: 64313370
- Dewey Decimal: 320.94309043 22
- LC Class: HC286.3 .T66 2006
- Preceded by: Statistics and the German State 1900–1945: The Making of Modern Economic Knowledge
- Followed by: The Deluge: The Great War, America and the Remaking of the Global Order, 1916–1931

The Wages of Destruction: The Making and Breaking of the Nazi Economy is a non-fiction book detailing the economic history of Nazi Germany. Written by Adam Tooze, it was first published by Allen Lane in 2006.

The Wages of Destruction won the Wolfson History Prize and the 2007 Longman/History Today Book of the Year Prize. It was published to critical praise from such authors as Michael Burleigh, Richard Overy and Niall Ferguson.

In the book, Tooze writes that after the Germans had failed to defeat Britain during the Battle of Britain in 1940, the economic logic of the war drove them to Operation Barbarossa, the invasion of the Soviet Union. Hitler was constrained to do so in 1941 to obtain the natural resources necessary to challenge the United States and the British Empire which were economic superpowers. Barbarossa sealed the fate of the Third Reich because it was resource constraints that made victory against the Soviet Union impossible, while the Soviets received supplies from the Americans and the British to supplement the resources that remained under their control.

The book makes the case for the economic impact of the British and then Anglo-American strategic bombing campaigns, but it argues that the wrong targets were often selected. The book also challenges the idea of an armaments miracle under Albert Speer and rejects the idea that the Nazi economy could have mobilised significantly more women for the war economy.

== Reception ==
The book was positively reviewed by History Today, which called it "an extraordinary achievement",

By thinking afresh about what Hitler’s war aims really were and how the Nazi leadership attempted first to win and then prolong a war for which they knew they never possessed sufficient resources, Tooze has produced the most striking history of German strategy in the Second World War that we possess.
