= Oliver Balch =

British author and freelance writer

Oliver Balch is a British author and journalist who writes on business, sustainability and international affairs. He has written for various publications including The Guardian, the Financial Times, The Daily Telegraph, The Spectator and Literary Review.

== Early life and education ==
Balch was educated at Felsted School. He studied history at Durham University as a member of Hatfield College, graduating with first-class honours in 1998, and subsequently completed an MPhil at the University of Cambridge.

In 2018, Balch received a PhD in Latin American Studies from Cambridge. His thesis examined corporate social responsibility and foreign investment in Uruguay.

== Career ==
After leaving university, Balch spent a year in Bolivia and later moved to Buenos Aires in Argentina, where he began working as a freelance journalist by sending story pitches to the foreign desks of major newspapers. Although intending to only live a year in Argentina, he ended up staying for seven. He eventually relocated his family to Hay-on-Wye in Wales.

Balch has written three books published by Faber & Faber. His first, Viva South America!, was published in 2009, followed by India Rising in 2012 and Under the Tump in 2016. He is a senior associate of the Cambridge Institute for Sustainability Leadership.

== Selected publications ==
- Viva South America!: A Journey Through a Restless Continent. London: Faber & Faber. 2009. ISBN 9780571237036.
- India Rising: Tales from a Changing Nation. London: Faber & Faber. 2012. ISBN 9780571259267.
- Under the Tump: Sketches of Real Life on the Welsh Borders. London: Faber & Faber. 2016. ISBN 9780571311958.
