= Emily Mitchell =

American novelist

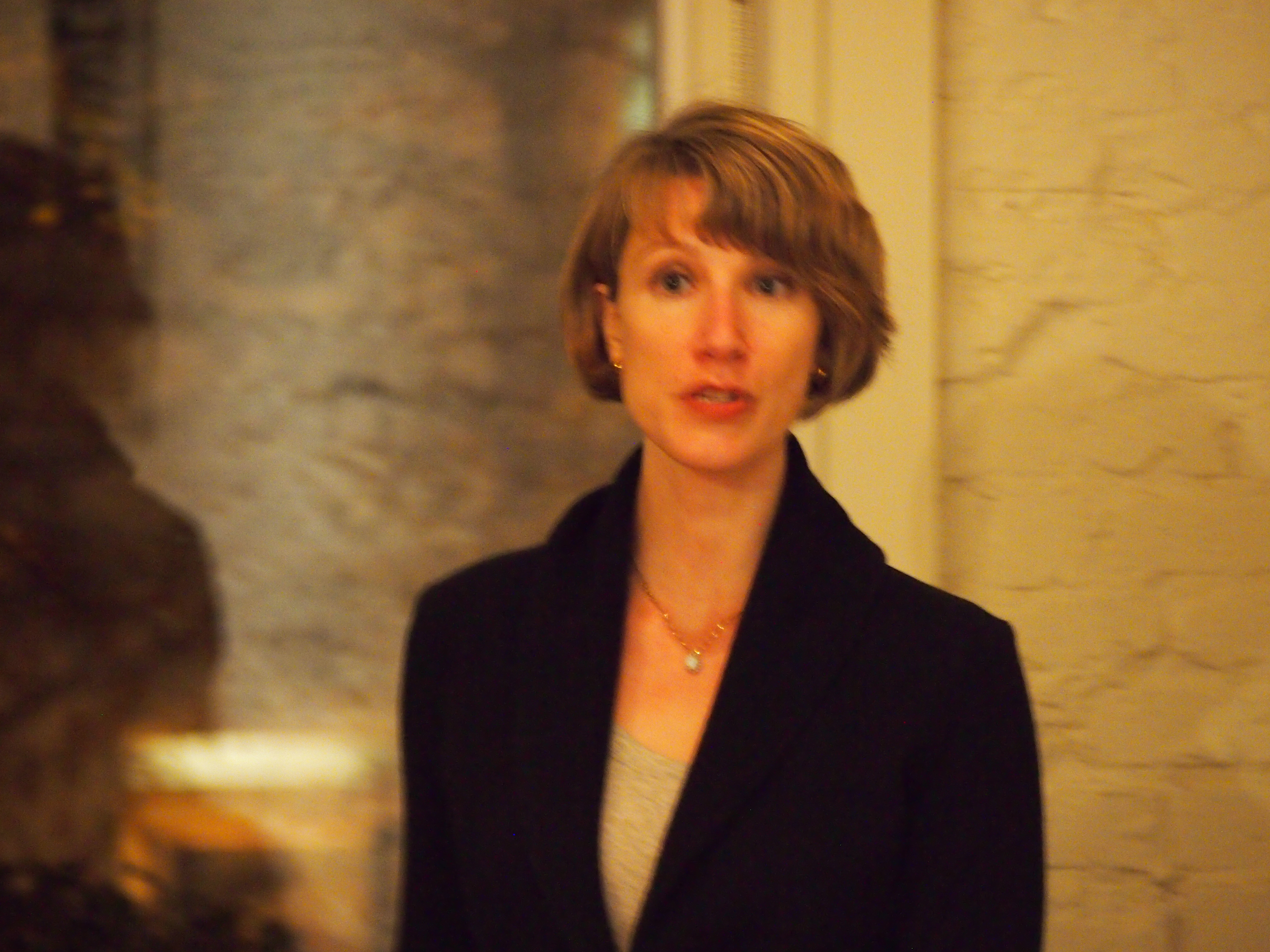
- Born: April 26, 1975 (age 51); London, England, United Kingdom
- Education: Middlebury College; Brooklyn College (MFA)
- Occupation: Novelist
- Writing career
- Period: contemporary
- Genre: literary fiction

Emily Mitchell (born April 26, 1975) is an Anglo-American writer. Her debut novel, The Last Summer of the World, was published by W. W. Norton & Company in 2007. It concerns the photographer Edward Steichen in the context of World War I and was a finalist for the 2008 Young Lions Award for fiction.

== Life ==
She was educated at Middlebury College as an undergraduate (class of 1997) and lived for many years in New York City where she obtained her Master of Fine Arts at Brooklyn College (studying with Michael Cunningham).

Her writing has appeared in Guernica, The Indiana Review, AGNI, The Nation, and The Utne Reader.

She resided in San Francisco, California. She is currently an Associate Professor in the English Department at the University of Maryland.

== Books ==
- The Last Summer of the World: A Novel W. W. Norton, 2007, ISBN 9780393247893
- Viral: Stories. W. W. Norton. 29 June 2015. ISBN 978-0-393-24537-0.
