= Ada Ferrer =

American historian

- Ferrer in 2026
- Born: Havana, Cuba
- Citizenship: United States
- Education: Vassar College 1984; University of Texas at Austin 1988; University of Michigan 1995
- Occupation: Historian
- Years active: 1995–present
- Employer: Princeton University
- Notable work: Freedom's Mirror: Cuba and Haiti in the Age of Revolution, Cuba: An American History
- Awards: Berkshire Conference of Women Historians Book Prize (1999); Frederick Douglass Book Prize (2015); Pulitzer Prize for History (2022)

Ada Ferrer is a Cuban-American historian. She joined the faculty at Princeton University as the Dayton-Stockton Professor of History in July 2024. She was awarded the 2022 Pulitzer Prize in History for her book Cuba: An American History.

== Early life ==
Ferrer was born in Havana, Cuba, and migrated to the United States with her mother in 1963 in the wake of the Cuban Missile Crisis. She grew up in West New York, New Jersey. She holds an AB degree in English from Vassar College, 1984, an MA degree in history from University of Texas at Austin, 1988, and a PhD in history from the University of Michigan, 1995.

== Career ==
Ferrer is Dayton-Stockton Professor of History and Latin American Studies at Princeton University. Before joining Princeton, she served as a professor of history and Latin American studies at New York University.

Ferrer received the Berkshire Conference of Women Historians Book Prize for her book Insurgent Cuba: Race, Nation and Revolution 1868–1898, She won the 2015 Frederick Douglass Book Prize for her book Freedom's Mirror: Cuba and Haiti in the Age of Revolution. The book also won the Friedrich Katz, Wesley Logan, and James A. Rawley prizes from the American Historical Association and the Haiti Illumination Prize from the Haitian Studies Association.

In 2021, Ferrer published Cuba: An American History, which won the 2022 Pulitzer Prize for History and was a finalist for the 2022 Cundill History Prize.

She is a 2018 Guggenheim Fellow.

Keeper of My Kin was a finalist for the 2026 Kirkus Prize for Nonfiction.

== Bibliography ==
=== Books ===
- Insurgent Cuba: Race, Nation, and Revolution, 1868–1898 . University of North Carolina Press, 1998
- Freedom's Mirror: Cuba and Haiti in the Age of Revolution. Cambridge University Press, 2014
- Cuba: An American History. Scribner, 2021
- Keeper of My Kin: Memoir of an Immigrant Daughter. Scribner, 2026

=== Essays and reporting ===
- Ferrer, Ada (March 1, 2021). "My brother's keeper : early in the Cuban Revolution, my mother made a consequential decision". Personal History. The New Yorker. 97 (2): 26–31.
