= The Deluge (Tooze book) =

2014 book

The Deluge: The Great War and the Remaking of the Global Order, 1916–1931
- First edition (UK)
- Author: Adam Tooze
- Language: English
- Subject: World War I
- Publisher: Allen Lane; Viking Penguin
- Publication date: 2014
- Publication place: England
- Pages: 672
- ISBN: 9781846140341

The Deluge: The Great War and the Remaking of the Global Order, 1916–1931 is a history book by Adam Tooze, first published by Allen Lane in 2014. The American edition is titled: The Deluge: The Great War, America and the Remaking of the Global Order, 1916–1931, and was published in the same year by Viking Press.

== Reception ==
The book was widely reviewed. The Guardian called it a "bold analysis". The Daily Telegraph called it "a formidable achievement".

However, the book was also criticised by Kevin Matthews of George Mason University for being "shot through with misstatements, contradictions, inconsistencies and other, basic, errors". Matthews singled out interpretive errors primarily about events in British history, including the 1906 British election, the 1916 Irish uprising and the 1923 British election. He also criticised weak primary source attribution by Tooze.

During an interview with Aaron Bastani for Novara Media in 2023, Peter Hitchens said that The Deluge "must be one of the best history books ever written".
