= Adam Tooze =

British historian (born 1967)

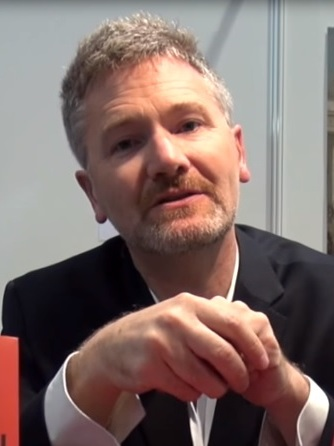
- Tooze in 2015
- Born: John Adam Tooze; 5 July 1967 (age 59); London, England
- Awards: Philip Leverhulme Prize (2002); Wolfson History Prize (2006); Lionel Gelber Prize (2019)

Academic background
- Education: King's College, Cambridge (BA); Free University of Berlin; London School of Economics (PhD)
- Thesis: Official Statistics and Economic Governance in Interwar Germany (1996)
- Doctoral advisor: Alan Milward
- Influences: Wynne Godley

Academic work
- Discipline: History
- Sub-discipline: Economic history; modern European history
- Institutions: Jesus College, Cambridge; Yale University; Columbia University
- Notable works: The Wages of Destruction (2006); The Deluge (2014); Crashed (2018)
- Website: adamtooze.com

John Adam Tooze (born 5 July 1967) is an English-American historian who is a professor at Columbia University, Director of the European Institute and nonresident scholar at Carnegie Europe. Previously, he was Reader in Twentieth-Century History at the University of Cambridge and Gurnee Hart Fellow in History at Jesus College, Cambridge.

After leaving Cambridge in 2009, he spent six years at Yale University as Professor of Modern German History and Director of International Security Studies at the MacMillan Center for International and Area Studies, succeeding Paul Kennedy. He has written books – such as Crashed – and an online newsletter called Chartbook.

== Early life ==
Tooze was born on 5 July 1967 to British parents who met at Cambridge. His father, John Tooze, was a molecular biologist who worked in Heidelberg, West Germany, where Tooze spent much of his childhood. His maternal grandparents were the social researchers Arthur and Margaret Wynn, who together wrote a study of the financial connections of the Conservative Party establishment. Arthur was also a civil servant and recruiter of Soviet spies at Oxford. Tooze considers his grandfather “a tough, tough, mean son of a bitch” and his 2006 book, The Wages of Destruction, is dedicated to them. He had an early interest in engineering and an aspiration to design engines for race cars. A precocious student, at secondary school he was permitted to teach a class on Keynesian modelling.

== Education and research ==
After studying at Highgate School from 1983 to 1985, Tooze graduated with a BA in economics from King's College, Cambridge in 1989. He then studied at the Free University of Berlin before moving to the London School of Economics for a doctorate in economic history under the supervision of Alan Milward.

In 2002 Tooze was awarded a Philip Leverhulme Prize for Modern History following the publication of his first book, Statistics and the German State, 1900–1945: The Making of Modern Economic Knowledge. He first came to prominence for his economic study of the Third Reich, The Wages of Destruction, which was one of the winners of the 2006 Wolfson History Prize, and a broad-based history of the First World War with The Deluge, published in 2014. He then widened his scope to study the financial crash of 2008 and its economic and geopolitical consequences with Crashed: How a Decade of Financial Crises Changed the World, published in 2018, for which he won the 2019 Lionel Gelber Prize. In 2021, Tooze published Shutdown: How Covid Shook the World's Economy, analyzing the economic impact of the COVID-19 pandemic and its fiscal policy responses.

Tooze writes for numerous publications, including the Financial Times, London Review of Books, New Left Review, The Wall Street Journal, The Guardian, Foreign Policy, Surplus, and Die Zeit. Since 2022 he sits on the board of the ZOE Institute for Future-fit economies. He also publishes a newsletter called Chartbook on Substack.

== Ones and Tooze Podcast ==
Since September 2021, Tooze hosts the podcast, Ones and Tooze, together with Cameron Abadi, a deputy editor at Foreign Policy. Episodes typically last 30–60 minutes and are published weekly on Fridays.

== Personal life ==
He has been twice married and has an adult daughter in the US. He became an American citizen in early 2025, because he was concerned about his precarious position as a green card holder.

== Honours ==
- H-Soz-Kult Prize for Modern History (2002)
- Philip Leverhulme Prize (2002)
- Wolfson History Prize (2006)
- Longman History Today Prize (2007)
- Los Angeles Times Book Prize for History (2015)
- Jean Monnet Programme - Awarded a Center of Excellence as Director of the European Institute at the Columbia University (2018)
- Lionel Gelber Prize (2019)
- Hans-Matthöfer-Preis für Wirtschaftspublizistik (2019)
- Preis für Wirtschaftspublizistik der Keynes-Gesellschaft (2023)

== Bibliography ==
=== Books ===
- Statistics and the German State, 1900–1945: The Making of Modern Economic Knowledge (Cambridge Studies in Modern Economic History), Cambridge: Cambridge University Press, 2001. ISBN 0-521-80318-7 Translated in German.
- The Wages of Destruction: The Making and Breaking of the Nazi Economy, London: Allen Lane, 2006. ISBN 0-7139-9566-1 Translated in German, French, Dutch, Italian, Polish, Portuguese and Russian.
- The Deluge: The Great War and the Remaking of the Global Order, 1916–1931, London: Allen Lane, 2014. ISBN 9781846140341 Translated in German, French, Dutch, Spanish, Chinese and Russian.
- Crashed: How a Decade of Financial Crises Changed the World, London: Allen Lane and New York: Viking, August 2018. ISBN 9781846140365 Translated in German, French, Dutch, Italian, Spanish, Portuguese, Chinese, Russian and Greek.
- Shutdown: How Covid Shook the World's Economy, Allen Lane, Sep 7 2021.

As editor

- Cambridge History of World War II. Volume 3 with Michael Geyer, Cambridge: Cambridge University Press, 2015.
- Normalität und Fragilität: Demokratie nach dem Ersten Weltkrieg with Tim B. Müller, Hamburg: Hamburger Editionen, 2015.

=== Newsletter ===
- Tooze, Adam. "Chartbook".

=== Essays and reporting ===
- "Is this the end of the American century? America Pivots", London Review of Books, 4 April 2019.
- "Democracy and Its Discontents", The New York Review of Books, 6 June 2019.
- Additional, ongoing series of original articles written on his website after the publication of Crashed, entitled Framing Crashed.
- "Whose century?", London Review of Books, vol. 42, no. 15 (30 July 2020), pp. 9–13. Tooze closes (p. 13): "Can [the US] fashion a domestic political bargain to enable the US to become what it currently is not: a competent and co-operative partner in the management of the collective risks of the Anthropocene. This is what the Green New Deal promised. After the shock of COVID-19 it is more urgent than ever."

=== Book reviews ===
Year	Review article	Work(s) reviewed
2020	Tooze, Adam (3–23 April 2020). "The War Against Climate Change". The Critics. Books. New Statesman. 149 (5514): 66–69.	Lieven, Anatol. Climate Change and the Nation State: The Realist Case. Allen Lane.
