= Empire Express =

2000 non-fiction book

Empire Express: Building the First Transcontinental Railroad
- Author: David Haward Bain
- Language: English
- Subject: History
- Publisher: Penguin Books
- Publication date: August 8, 2000
- Media type: Print, hardcover and paperback
- Pages: 816 pp
- ISBN: 978-0-14-008499-3

Empire Express: Building the First Transcontinental Railroad is a book written by David Haward Bain, published in 2000. It follows the initial conception of the idea of a transcontinental railroad, during the two decades before the Civil War, to the work of the engineers and entrepreneurs who fixed the route, assembled financing, drafted a work force and launched the two lines toward the eventual meeting point at Promontory Summit, Utah, in 1869. The story alternates between the Union Pacific driving west from Omaha and the Central Pacific blasting through the mountains from California.

Bain examines the impact of the railroad on the Plains Indians, whose traditional way of life was eradicated by the line. He also deals with the imported Chinese workers, the "Celestials", who became known for their tenacity and work ethic.
