= Eric Foner =

American historian (born 1943)

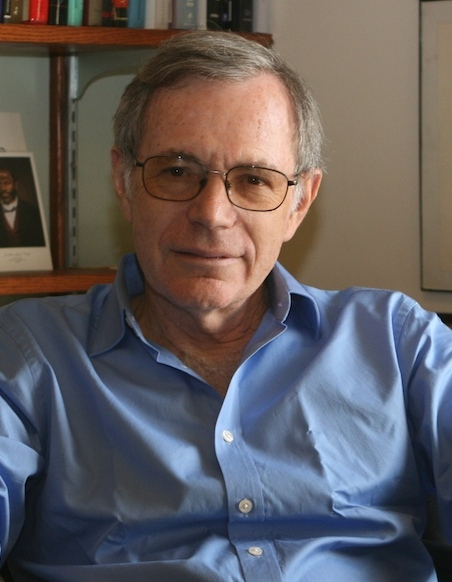
- Foner in 2009
- Born: February 7, 1943 (age 83); New York City, U.S.
- Occupation: Historian
- Spouses: Naomi Achs (m. 1965; div. 1977); Lynn Garafola (m. 1980)
- Children: 1
- Parent: Jack D. Foner (father)
- Awards: Bancroft Prize (1989; 2011); Lincoln Prize (2011); Pulitzer Prize (2011)

Academic background
- Education: Columbia University; Oriel College, Oxford
- Doctoral advisor: Richard Hofstadter
- Influences: James P. Shenton

Academic work
- Discipline: History
- Sub-discipline: American political history
- Institutions: City College of New York; Columbia University
- Notable students: Elizabeth Hinton; Mae Ngai
- Notable works: Reconstruction: America's Unfinished Revolution - 1863-1877 (1988); The Fiery Trial (2010)

Eric Foner (/ˈfoʊnər/; born February 7, 1943) is an American historian. He writes extensively on American political history, the history of freedom, the early history of the Republican Party, African American biography, the American Civil War, Reconstruction, and historiography, and has been a member of the faculty at the Columbia University Department of History since 1982.

He is the author of several popular textbooks, such as the Give Me Liberty! series for high school classrooms. According to the Open Syllabus Project, Foner is the most frequently cited author on college syllabi for history courses.

Foner has published several books on the Reconstruction period, starting with Reconstruction: America's Unfinished Revolution, 1863–1877 in 1988. His online courses on "The Civil War and Reconstruction", published in 2014, was available from Columbia University on ColumbiaX.

In 2011, Foner's The Fiery Trial (2010) won the Pulitzer Prize for History, the Lincoln Prize, and the Bancroft Prize. Foner previously won the Bancroft Prize in 1989 for Reconstruction. In 2000, he was elected president of the American Historical Association. He was elected to the American Philosophical Society in 2018.

== Early life and education ==
Foner was born February 7, 1943, in New York City, New York, the son of Jewish parents, Liza (née Kraitz), a high school art teacher, and historian Jack D. Foner, who was active in the trade union movement and the campaign for civil rights for African Americans. Eric Foner describes his father as his "first great teacher", and recalls how

deprived of his livelihood while I was growing up, he supported our family as a freelance lecturer. [...] Listening to his lectures, I came to appreciate how present concerns can be illuminated by the study of the past—how the repression of the McCarthy era recalled the days of the Alien and Sedition Acts, the civil rights movement needed to be viewed in light of the great struggles of black and white abolitionists, and in the brutal suppression of the Philippine insurrection at the turn of the century could be found the antecedents of American intervention in Vietnam. I also imbibed a way of thinking about the past in which visionaries and underdogs—Tom Paine, Wendell Phillips, Eugene V. Debs, and W. E. B. Du Bois—were as central to the historical drama as presidents and captains of industry, and how a commitment to social justice could infuse one's attitudes towards the past.

After graduating from Long Beach High School in 1959, Foner enrolled at Columbia University, where he was originally a physics major, before switching to history after taking a year-long seminar with James P. Shenton on the Civil War and Reconstruction during his junior year. "It probably determined that most of my career has been focused on that period," he recalled years later. A year later, in 1963, Foner graduated with a BA in history. He studied at the University of Oxford as a Kellett Fellow; he received a BA from Oriel College in 1965, where he was a member of the college's 1966 University Challenge-winning team, though he did not appear in the final, having already returned to the US. After graduating from Oxford, Foner returned to Columbia where he earned his doctoral degree in 1969 under the supervision of Richard Hofstadter. His doctoral thesis, published in 1970 as Free Soil, Free Labor, Free Men: The Ideology of the Republican Party Before the Civil War, explored the deeply rooted ideals and interests that drove the northern majority to oppose slavery and ultimately wage war against Southern secession.

== Career ==
=== Writing on the Reconstruction Era ===
Foner is a leading authority on the Reconstruction Era. In a seminal essay in American Heritage in October 1982, later reprinted in Reviews in American History, Foner wrote:

In the past twenty years, no period of American history has been the subject of a more thoroughgoing reevaluation than Reconstruction—the violent, dramatic, and still controversial era following the Civil War. Race relations, politics, social life, and economic change during Reconstruction have all been reinterpreted in the light of changed attitudes toward the place of blacks within American society. If historians have not yet forged a fully satisfying portrait of Reconstruction as a whole, the traditional interpretation that dominated historical writing for much of this century has irrevocably been laid to rest.

"Foner has established himself as the leading authority on the Reconstruction period," wrote historian Michael Perman in reviewing Foner's book Reconstruction: America's Unfinished Revolution, 1863–1877. "This book is not simply a distillation of the secondary literature; it is a masterly account—broad in scope as well as rich in detail and insight." "This is history written on a grand scale, a masterful treatment of one of the most complex periods of American history," David Herbert Donald wrote in The New Republic. C. Vann Woodward, in The New York Review of Books, wrote: "Eric Foner has put together this terrible story with greater cogency and power, I believe, than has been brought to the subject heretofore." Reconstruction won the 1989 Bancroft Prize, Francis Parkman Prize, Los Angeles Times Book Prize for History, Avery O. Craven Prize, and Lionel Trilling Book Award.

In a 2009 essay, Foner pondered whether Reconstruction might have turned out differently:

It is wrong to think that, during the Civil War, President Lincoln embraced a single "plan" of Reconstruction. [...] Lincoln had always been willing to work closely with all factions of his party, including the Radicals on numerous occasions. I think it is quite plausible to imagine Lincoln and Congress agreeing to a Reconstruction policy encompassing basic civil rights for blacks (as was enacted in 1866) plus limited black suffrage, along the lines he proposed just before his death.

Foner published a short summary of his views on Reconstruction in The New York Times in 2015.

=== Writing on the Soviet Union ===
As a visiting professor in Moscow in the early 1990s, Foner would write about the broad interest in free markets among both his students and the Soviet public. He attributed these feeling with a mixture of historical illiteracy about the importance of the labor movement in the United States in the economic success of the nation and the mistaken creation of a white collared workforce, who's vision of capitalism he compared to Thomas Paine.

Foner would compare secessionist forces in the Soviet Union with the secession movement in the US in the 1860s. In a February 1991 article, Foner noted that the Baltic states claimed the right to secede because they had been unwillingly annexed. In addition, he believed that the Soviet Union did not protect minorities while it tried to nationalize the republics. Foner identified a threat to existing minority groups within the Baltic states, who were in turn threatened by the new nationalist movements.

In his 2001 address as president of the American Historical Association Foner would argue the emergence of the Cold War was propelled by an aversion to the Economy of the Soviet Union.

=== Writing on the September 11th Attacks ===
Foner was invited to contribute to an article in the London Review of Books published 3 weeks after the September 11th Attack. Foner opened his contribution writing "I’m not sure which is more frightening: the horror that engulfed New York City or the apocalyptic rhetoric emanating daily from the White House.".

=== Other publications and media appearances ===
In a New York Times op-ed, he criticized President Donald Trump's tweet calling for the preservation of Confederate monuments and heritage, stating that they represented and glorified white supremacy rather than collective heritage. According to historian Timothy Snyder, Foner was the first to associate the January 6 United States Capitol attack with section three of the Fourteenth Amendment to the Constitution.

Foner has made appearances on shows such as The Colbert Report and The Daily Show to discuss US history.

== Reception ==
Journalist Nat Hentoff described Foner's The Story of American Freedom as "an indispensable book that should be read in every school in the land." "Eric Foner is one of the most prolific, creative, and influential American historians of the past 20 years," according to The Washington Post. His work is "brilliant, important," a reviewer wrote in the Los Angeles Times.

In a review of The Story of American Freedom in the New York Review of Books, Theodore Draper disagreed with Foner's conclusions, saying: "If the story of American freedom is told largely from the perspective of blacks and women, especially the former, it is not going to be a pretty tale. Yet most Americans thought of themselves not only as free but as the freest people in the world."

John Patrick Diggins of the City University of New York wrote that Foner's Reconstruction: America's Unfinished Revolution, 1863–1877, was a "magisterial" and "moving" narrative, but compared Foner's "unforgiving" view of America for its racist past to his notably different views on the fall of communism and Soviet history.

Foner's book Gateway to Freedom: The Hidden History of the Underground Railroad (2015) was judged "intellectually probing and emotionally resonant" by the Los Angeles Times. His previous book The Fiery Trial: Abraham Lincoln and American Slavery (2010) was described by Library Journal as "stand[ing] out as the most sensible and sensitive reading of Lincoln's lifetime involvement with slavery and the most insightful assessment of Lincoln's—and indeed America's—imperative to move toward freedom lest it be lost."

== Awards and honors ==
In 1989, Foner received the Avery O. Craven Award from the Organization of American Historians. In 1991, Foner received the Great Teacher Award from the Society of Columbia Graduates. In 1995, he was named Scholar of the Year by the New York Council for the Humanities.

In 2009, Foner was inducted as a laureate of the Lincoln Academy of Illinois and awarded the Order of Lincoln (the state's highest honor) by the Governor of Illinois as a Bicentennial Laureate.

In 2012, Foner received the Lincoln Forum's Richard Nelson Current Award of Achievement.

In 2020, Foner was awarded the Roy Rosenzweig Distinguished Service Award from the Organization of American Historians, which goes to an individual or individuals whose contributions have significantly enriched understanding and appreciation of American history.

== Personal life ==
Foner was married to screenwriter Naomi Foner Gyllenhaal (née Achs) from 1965 to 1977. Since 1980, Foner has been married to historian Lynn Garafola. They have a daughter, Daria.

== Works ==
=== Books ===
External videos
- Booknotes interview with Foner on The Story of American Freedom, November 15, 1998, C-SPAN
- Presentation by Foner and Joshua Brown on Forever Free, January 12, 2006, C-SPAN
- Presentation by Foner on The Fiery Trial, October 27, 2010, C-SPAN
- Interview with Foner on The Fiery Trial, September 24, 2011, C-SPAN
- Presentation by Foner on The Fiery Trial, September 24, 2011, C-SPAN
- After Words interview with Foner on Gateway to Freedom, March 21, 2015, C-SPAN
- Presentation by Foner on Gateway to Freedom, September 30, 2015, C-SPAN
- Presentation by Foner on The Second Founding, October 2, 2019, C-SPAN

- Free Soil, Free Labor, Free Men: The Ideology of the Republican Party Before the Civil War. New York: Oxford University Press. 1995 [1970]. ISBN 978-0-19-509497-8. Reissued with a new preface.
- America's Black Past: A Reader in Afro-American History. New York: Harper & Row. 1970. Editor.
- Nat Turner. Englewood Cliffs, N.J.: Prentice-Hall. 1971. ISBN 978-0-13-933143-5. Editor.
- Tom Paine and Revolutionary America. New York: Oxford University Press. 1976. ISBN 978-0-19-501986-5.
- Politics and Ideology in the Age of the Civil War. New York: Oxford University Press. 1980. ISBN 978-0-19-502781-5.
- Nothing but Freedom: Emancipation and Its Legacy. Baton Rouge: Louisiana State University Press. 1983. ISBN 978-0-8071-1118-5.
- Reconstruction: America's Unfinished Revolution, 1863–1877. New York: Harper & Row. 1988. ISBN 978-0-06-015851-4. Updated edition published in 2014 by Harper Perennial Modern Classics.
- A Short History of Reconstruction, 1863–1877. New York: Harper & Row. 1990. ISBN 978-0-06-096431-3. An abridgement of Reconstruction: America's Unfinished Revolution.
- A House Divided: America in the Age of Lincoln. Chicago: Chicago Historical Society. 1990. ISBN 978-0-393-02755-6. With Olivia Mahoney.
- The Reader's Companion to American History. Boston: Houghton-Mifflin. 1991. ISBN 978-0-395-51372-9. With John A. Garraty.
- The Tocsin of Freedom: The Black Leadership of Radical Reconstruction. Gettysburg College. 1992.
- Slavery and Freedom in Nineteenth-Century America. New York: Oxford University Press. 1994. ISBN 978-0-19-952266-8.
- America's Reconstruction: People and Politics After the Civil War. New York: HarperPerennial. 1995. ISBN 978-0-06-055346-3. With Olivia Mahoney.
- Freedom's Lawmakers: A Directory of Black Officeholders During Reconstruction (Revised ed.). Baton Rouge: Louisiana State University Press. 1996. ISBN 978-0-8071-2082-8.
- The New American History (Revised ed.). Philadelphia: Temple University Press. 1997. ISBN 978-1-56639-551-9. Editor.
- The Story of American Freedom. New York: W. W. Norton. 1998. ISBN 978-0-393-04665-6.
- Who Owns History?: Rethinking the Past in a Changing World. New York: Hill and Wang. 2002. ISBN 978-0-8090-9704-3.
- Give Me Liberty!: An American History. New York: W.W. Norton. 2004. ISBN 978-0-393-97872-8.
- Voices of Freedom: A Documentary History. Vol. 1. W.W. Norton. 2004. ISBN 9780393925036. Editor.
- Voices of Freedom: A Documentary History. Vol. 2. W.W. Norton. 2008. ISBN 9780393931082. Editor.
- Forever Free: The Story of Emancipation and Reconstruction. New York: Alfred A. Knopf. 2005. ISBN 978-0-375-40259-3.
- Our Lincoln: New Perspectives on Lincoln and his World. New York: W. W. Norton. 2008. ISBN 978-0-393-06756-9. Editor.
- The Fiery Trial: Abraham Lincoln and American Slavery. New York: W. W. Norton. 2010.
- Slavery's Ghost: The Problem of Freedom in the Age of Emancipation. JHU Press. 2011. ISBN 978-1-4214-0235-2. Editor with Richard Follett and Walter Johnson.
- Gateway to Freedom: The Hidden History of the Underground Railroad. New York: W. W. Norton & Co. 2015. ISBN 978-0-393-24407-6.
- Battles for Freedom: The Use and Abuse of American History. I. B. Tauris. 2017. ISBN 978-1-78453-769-2.
- The Second Founding: How the Civil War and Reconstruction Remade the Constitution. New York: W. W. Norton. 2019. ISBN 978-0-393-65258-1.
- Our Fragile Freedoms: Essays. New York: W. W. Norton. 2025. ISBN 978-1-324-11061-3.

=== Selected articles ===
- "Radical Individualism in America: Revolution to Civil War". Literature of Liberty. 1 (3): 1–31. July–September 1978.
- "The New View of Reconstruction". American Heritage. 34 (6). October–November 1983.
- Foner, Eric (Spring 1984). "Why Is There No Socialism in the United States?". History Workshop Journal. 17 (17): 57–80. doi:10.1093/hwj/17.1.57. JSTOR 4288545.
- "The South's Inner Civil War". American Heritage. Vol. 40, no. 2. March 1989.
- "Expert Report of Eric Foner". Michigan Journal of Race and Law. 5 (1): 311–338. 1999.
- "Rebel Yell". The Nation. January 27, 2000.
- "Changing History". The Nation. September 5, 2002.
- "The Century, A Nation's Eye View". The Nation. December 10, 2002.
- "Not All Freedom Is Made In America". The New York Times. April 13, 2003.
- "Dare Call It Treason". The Nation. June 2, 2003.
- "Diversity Over Justice". The Nation. June 26, 2003.
- "Rethinking American History in a Post-9/11 World". History News Network. September 6, 2004.
- "He's the Worst Ever". The Washington Post. December 3, 2006.
- "If Lincoln Hadn't Died..." American Heritage. Vol. 58, no. 6. Winter 2009.
- "The Civil War in 'Postracial' America". The Nation. October 10, 2011.
- Foner, Eric (November 2012). "The Supreme Court and the History of Reconstruction – and Vice-Versa". Columbia Law Review. 112 (7): 1585–1606. JSTOR 41708159.
- "The Emancipation of Abe Lincoln". The New York Times. January 1, 2013.
- "The Corrupt Bargain". London Review of Books. Vol. 42, no. 10. May 21, 2020.
- "The Many American Revolutions". The Nation. April 4, 2022.
- "The Little Man's Big Friends". London Review of Books. Vol. 45, no. 11. June 1, 2023.

Academic offices
Preceded by Eliot Freidson	Pitt Professor of American History and Institutions; 1980–1981	Succeeded by Douglass North
Preceded by John Lewis Gaddis	Harmsworth Professor of American History; 1993	Succeeded by Robert Dallek
Professional and academic associations
Preceded by Lawrence W. Levine	President of the Organization of American Historians; 1993–1994	Succeeded by Gary B. Nash
Preceded by Robert Darnton	President of the American Historical Association; 2000	Succeeded by Wm. Roger Louis
Awards
Preceded by Peter Kolchin	Bancroft Prize; 1989; With: Edmund Morgan	Succeeded by Neil R. McMillen
Preceded by Michael S. Sherry	Bancroft Prize; 1989; With: Edmund Morgan	Succeeded by James Merrell
Preceded by Michael Burlingame	Lincoln Prize; 2011	Succeeded by Elizabeth D. Leonard
Preceded by Liaquat Ahamed	Pulitzer Prize for History; 2011	Succeeded by Manning Marable
