= Harold Keith Johnson Chair =

The General Harold Keith Johnson Chair was established at the U.S. Army Military History Research Collection, the nucleus of the collection consisted of 50,000 bound volumes, transferred from the Army War College and National War College and housed in Upton Hall. Among its first manuscript acquisitions were the extensive official and personal papers of General Johnson himself, who donated them to the Military History Research Collection upon his retirement from the Army.

Johnson served as Chief of Staff of the United States Army from 1964–1968. During his term, he approved a recommendation to establish at Carlisle Barracks a library and a repository of documents to encourage the study of military history. Initially designated the U.S. Army Military History Research Collection, the nucleus of the collection included 50,000 bound volumes, transferred from the Army War College and National War College. Among its first manuscript acquisitions were the extensive official and personal papers of Johnson himself, who donated them to the Military History Research Collection upon his retirement from the Army. The collection's holdings expanded rapidly during the 1970s and began to draw serious researchers from across the country; in 1972 an annual visiting professor position was created, with Theodore Ropp of Duke University as its first holder.

In 1977 Military History Research Collection was renamed the U.S. Army Military History Institute (USAMHI). The following year, the annual visiting professor position was designated the Harold Keith Johnson Chair in Military History. Although configured as a scholar-in-residence program, in practice most holders of the chair assumed informal roles within the Army War College itself, engaging with student seminar groups and teaching elective courses. In 2006 the chair was transferred from the USAMHI to the War College itself. It is today controlled by the dean of academics and housed administratively in one of the college's three academic departments, currently the Department of National Security and Strategy (DNSS).

== Holders ==
Chair holders have included:

- 1972-1973 Theodore Ropp, Duke University
- 1973-1974 Russell F. Weigley Temple University
- 1974-1975 John W. Shy, University of Michigan
- 1975-1976 Martin Blumenson, Washington, D.C.
- 1976-1977 Hugh M. Cole, Blue Ridge Summit, PA.
- 1977-1978 John F. Mahon, University of Florida
- 1978-1979 Harold C. Deutsch, U.S. Army War College
- 1978-1980 D. Clayton James, Mississippi State University
- 1980-1981 Richard H. Kohn, Rutgers University
- 1981-1982 Charles P. Roland, University of Kentucky
- 1982-1983 Jay Luvaas, Allegheny College, 1982–1983.
- 1983-1984 Daniel R. Beaver, University of Cincinnati
- 1984-1985 Graham A. Cosmas, U.S. Army Center of Military History
- 1985-1986 Claude C. Sturgill, University of Florida
- 1986-1987 Edward M. Coffman, University of Wisconsin
- 1987-1988 Richard P. Hallion, National Museum of the U.S. Air Force
- 1988-1989 Alex F. Roland, Duke University
- 1989-1990 Stephen E. Ambrose, University of New Orleans
- 1990-1991 Jerry M. Cooper, University of Missouri at St. Louis
- 1991-1992 Joseph T. Glatthaar, University of Houston
- 1992-1993 Vacant
- 1993-1994 Carol Reardon, Pennsylvania State University
- 1994-1995 Brig. Genl. Harold W. Nelson, U.S. Army Center of Military History
- 1995-1996 Col. Robert A. Doughty, U.S. Military Academy
- 1996-1997 Vacant
- 1997-1998 Vacant
- 1998-1999 Williamson Murray, Professor Emeritus, Ohio State University
- 1999-2000 Brian M. Linn, Texas A & M University, 1999–2000.
- 2000-2001 Eugenia C. Kiesling, U.S. Military Academy
- 2001-2001 Tami D. Biddle, Duke University
- 2002-2003 Vacant
- 2003-2004 Alexander S. Cochran, Naval War College
- 2004-2005 Mark A. Stoler, University of Vermont
- 2005-2006 Ronald H. Spector, George Washington University
- 2006-2007 Vacant
- 2007-2008 Richard J. Sommers, U.S. Army Military History Institute
- 2008-2009 C. Mark Grimsley, Ohio State University, (DNSS/USAWC)
- 2009-2010 C. Mark Grimsley, Ohio State University
- 2010-2011
- 2011-2012
- 2012-2013 Bill Allison, Georgia Southern University
- 2013-2014 Bill Allison, Georgia Southern University
- 2014-2015
- 2015-2016
- 2016-2017 Holly A. Mayer, Duquesne University
- 2017-2018 Jennifer Mittelstadt, Rutgers University
- 2019-2020 Mark Sheftall, Bucknell University
- 2020-2021 Daniel Krebs, University of Louisville
- 2021-2022 Mark Sheftall, Bucknell University
- 2022-2023 Ian Andrew Isherwood, Gettysburg College
- 2023-2024 Kristin Mulready-Stone, Naval War College
- 2024-2025 David Kieran, Columbus State University
- 2025-2027 Jadwiga Biskupska, Sam Houston State University
