= Jay Luvaas =

American military historian (1927–2009)

- Born: Morten Jay Luvaas Jr; 15 June 1927; Erie, Pennsylvania
- Died: 9 January 2009 (aged 81); Williamsburg, Pennsylvania
- Occupation: Military historian
- Spouse: Linda Sowers
- Children: 5
- Parents: Morten Luvaas; Agnes Olson
- Awards: Outstanding Civilian Service Medal (2)

Academic background
- Education: Allegheny College (A.B., 1949, A.M., 1951); Duke University (Ph.D., 1956)
- Thesis: The Military Legacy of the Civil War: The European Inheritance (1956)
- Doctoral advisor: Theodore Ropp

Academic work
- Discipline: Military history
- Institutions: Allegheny College, 1956–1982; Visiting professor, United States Military Academy, 1972; Harold Keith Johnson Chair, 1982–1983; Army War College 1983–1996; Distinguished Fellow, Army War College 1997–2009
- Notable works: The Education of an Army: British Military Thought 1815–1940, 1964; Napoleon on the Art of War, (1969); Frederick the Great on the Art of War (1979); Guide to the Battle of Gettysburg (1986)

Jay Luvaas (15 June 1927 – 9 January 2009) was an American military historian who was an expert on the American Civil War and the history of military theory. He was the first civilian to hold a visiting professorship of military history at West Point, and was a professor of military history at the United States Army War College in Carlisle, Pennsylvania. He was the founder of the modern military staff ride, and was a two-time recipient of the Outstanding Civilian Service Medal of the Department of the Army.

== Family and education ==
Jay Luvaas was the son of Morten Jay Luvaas (1896–1973) and Agnes Olson (1900–1982), both children of Norwegian immigrants. He was born on 15 June 1927 in Erie, Pennsylvania and grew up in Meadville, where his father, a graduate of St. Olaf College, taught music at Allegheny College, and composed choral music. Luvaas served in the US Navy from July 1945 to March 1946, and graduated from Allegheny in 1949; he received his Ph.D. in military history from Duke University in 1956, where he was a student of Theodore Ropp. Luvaas died in 2009 from complications of Alzheimers and was survived by his wife, Linda Sowers, and his five children; he was interred in Evergreen Cemetery in Gettysburg.

== Career ==
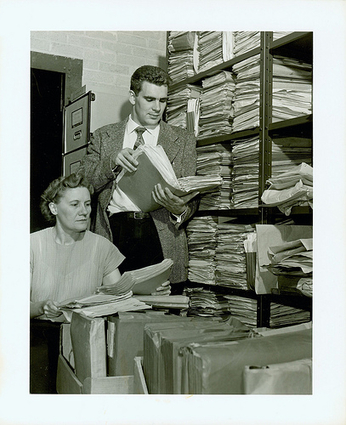
Jay Luvaas in 1954, at the Duke University manuscript collection, with curator Mattie Russell.

Luvaas' The Civil War: A Soldier's View (1958) collected the writings of Colonel George Francis Robert Henderson, a British observer of the American Civil War. Henderson's international reputation had been built on a biography of Stonewall Jackson; Luvaas' study combined Henderson's work as a military historian/biographer and a teacher of the art of war, recognizing that Henderson's fame rested on his career as a teacher and writer, not as a field officer. In the final chapter, as J. Orin Oliphant points out, Luvaas analyzed Henderson's contribution to military thinking and education.

In 1959, the University of Chicago Press published Luvaas' dissertation on the lessons learned by British, French and Prussian military observers of the Civil War, The Military Legacy of the Civil War: The European Inheritance; this was republished in 1988 by University of Kansas. In this study, he examined the American Civil War through a foreign soldier's eyes, and found the view very different from those presented by American soldiers. Luvaas offered a careful account of the conclusions of the European military observers, particularly the Prussian, British and French. These observers eventually helped to shape tactics of World War I and World War II, but not, as previously believed, the Second Schleswig War between Prussia and Denmark or the Franco-Prussian War.

From 1956 to 1982, Luvaas taught at his own alma mater, Allegheny College, where he was a professor of history. In 1972, he was the first civilian to serve as a visiting professor at the United States Military Academy. In 1982, he left Allegheny to teach at the Army War College, where he held the prestigious Harold Keith Johnson Chair of Military History at the U.S. Army Military History Institute (USAMHI). Accepting a permanent position there, he taught lieutenant colonels and colonels on the fast track for general staff posts, and wrote papers and taught courses specific to their interests and needs.

Luvaas remained at the Army War College until his retirement in 1995. After his retirement, he became Distinguished Fellow there in 1997. He was a two-time recipient of the Outstanding Civilian Service Medal from the Department of the Army. In his retirement, he was also director of the George Washington Flowers Collection of Southern Americana at the Duke University Library.

=== Impact on study of military history ===
Military historians consider Luvaas the founder of the modern staff ride. He visited the battlefields of the American Civil War annually, either on War College Staff Rides or with regular tours. Beginning in 1962, Luvaas led groups of amateur and student historians to various Virginia and Pennsylvania battlefields; the group, nicknamed the Army of Cussewago, after Cussewago Creek near Meadville, included over time Luvaas' friends, interested historians, students from Allegheny, and cadets from West Point. Luvaas' and Nelson's volume the U.S. Army War College Guide to the Battle of Gettysburg (1986) is a feature in Civil War battlefield tours.

With his friend Brigadier General Harold W. Nelson, Luvaas authored several volumes of the US Army War College Staff Ride Series on the Civil War: Gettysburg, Antietam, Fredericksburg and Chancellorsville, and co-authored another on the Battle of Shiloh and the Atlanta campaign. Luvaas also the translated military writings of Napoleon and Frederick the Great, and edited volumes of the writings by George Henderson, and a book on the history of military theory in Britain in the 19th and 20th centuries.

Luvaas argued that the primary value of the subject of history to a military officer is not merely a factual background, but also a grasp of trends and the meaning of ideas. History should not be subjected to the idea that it repeats itself, an unreasonable process that forces historical evidence into convenient patterns. Rather, the study of history, military history in particular, helps to illustrate points of leadership and doctrine. In his 1985 essay on officer education, Luvaas maintained that the best people to teach officers were civilian historians, although others promoted a modified view, that a faculty of civilian military historians should be tempered with professional soldiers.

The combined spirit if the professional soldier and the civilian historian, Benjamin Franklin Cooling suggests, is a new school of military history that unifies old and new historical styles: it modifies the patriotic gore described by Edmund Wilson with contextual and integrative studies of leadership and theory. There is room for both the "informed and broader contextual study of military history as suggested by Professor Jay Luvaas, ... and [for] his more popular resurrected "historical rides" to Civil War battlefields."

=== Assessment ===
Luvaas was one of a generation of historians to examine the Anglo-American tradition in military history. Trumbull Higgins described Luvaas' work in Education of An Army: British Military Thought 1815-1940 (1964), as a careful and detailed study of the development in military thought from Wellington to World War I, and a much needed analysis that flowed logically from Luvaas' earlier work on the Civil War.

In his 1999 review of Military Legacy of the Civil War (1959), Owen Connelly maintained that Luvaas had never written or edited a bad book and that he "demolished the widely accepted idea that U.S. Civil War had demonstrated the nature of modern war to Europeans, especially the Prussians," lessons that they employed successfully against Denmark and France immediately. Instead, Connelly maintained, Luvaas argued that the Prussians had all but ignored their Civil War observations until after 1914, as did the other powers. According to Connelly, Luvaas' work in Napoleon on the Art of War argued that Napoleon "created" the operational level of war, a category between strategy and tactics. Furthermore, Napoleon made the corps his standard unit, and it was adopted by all the major armies in turn, making operational art possible.

== Selected writing ==
- The Military Legacy of the Civil War: The European Inheritance, University of Chicago Press 1959, University Press of Kansas, 1988
- A Prussian Observer with Lee, American Military Institute, 1957
- The education of an army: British military thought 1815–1940, University of Chicago Press 1964
- Editor: George Henderson The Civil War: a soldier’s view; a collection of Civil War writings, University of Chicago Press 1958
- New interpretations of The Civil War / in the writings of Col. G.F.R. Henderson, Da Capo 1996
- Editor and Translator, Frederick the Great on the Art of War, Da Capo 1999
- Editor and Translator, Napoleon on the Art of War, New York: Free Press 1999
- with Harold W. Nelson: The U.S. Army War College guide to the Battles of Chancellorsville & Fredericksburg, New York: Perennial Library 1989
- with Harold W. Nelson: The U.S. Army War College guide to the Battle of Gettysburg, Carlisle, Pennsylvania: South Mountain Press 1986, 2. Auflage mit Leonard Fullenkamp, University Press of Kansas, 2012.
- with Harold W. Nelson: Guide to the Atlanta campaign : Rocky Face Ridge to Kennesaw Mountain, University Press of Kansas 2008
- Contributor with Stephen Bowman, Leonard Fullenkamp], Guide to the Battle of Shiloh, University Press of Kansas 1996
- with Harold W. Nelson: The U.S. Army War College guide to the Battle of Antietam : the Maryland Campaign of 1862, Perennial Library 1987
- New Introduction by Basil Liddell Hart, Sherman: soldier, realist, American, Da Capo 1993
- Generalship, historical perspectives, US Army Center of Military History 2008
- Editor, Dear Miss Em: General Eichelberger’s war in the Pacific, 1942–1945, Westport, Connecticut: Greenwood Press 1972
- Contributor, "The Great Military Historians and Philosophers" (chapter four), in John E. Jessup (ed), A Guide to the Study and Use of Military History Government Printing Office, 1979
- Contributor, "European Military Thought and Doctrine, 1870-1914" (chapter four), in Michael Howard (ed.), The Theory and Practice of War: Essays Presented to Captain B. H. Liddell Hart on his Seventieth Birthday, London: Cassell & Co. Ltd., 1965
