= Robert A. Doughty =

American military historian (born 1943)

- Born: Robert Allan Doughty; November 4, 1943 (age 82); Tullos, Louisiana, U.S.

Academic background
- Education: United States Military Academy (BS); University of California, Los Angeles (MA); University of Kansas (PhD)

Academic work
- Discipline: Military History
- Institutions: United States Military Academy

Robert Allan Doughty (November 4, 1943 – March 18, 2026) was an American military historian and United States Army officer.

== Early life ==
Doughty was born in Tullos, Louisiana, on November 4, 1943, to parents John and Georgia Doughty.

== Career ==
He attended the United States Military Academy, graduating in 1965. Doughty subsequently completed a tour of duty in Germany before deploying to Vietnam in an advisory role in 1968. Upon his return to the United States, Doughty pursued graduate study, earning a master's degree from the University of California, Los Angeles in 1972, followed by a doctorate from the University of Kansas in 1979. From 1979 to 1981, Doughty served a second stint in Germany. In 1985, he was named head of the history department at West Point, and retired from the position in 2005.

Doughty devoted much of his career to studying French military actions during the world wars. He held the Harold Keith Johnson Chair in Military History at the U.S. Army Military History Institute from 1995 to 1996.

== Personal life ==
He is the father of the singer-songwriter Mike Doughty.

== Awards and recognition ==
In 1986, Doughty received the Paul Birdsall Prize from the American Historical Association. The Society for Military History named him the 2006 awardee of the Samuel Eliot Morison Prize.

== Selected books ==
- Doughty, R. A. (2014) [1985]. The Seeds of Disaster: The Development of French Army Doctrine, 1919–39 (Stackpole, Mechanicsburg, PA ed.). Hamden, CT: Archon Books. ISBN 978-0-8117-1460-0.
- Doughty, Robert A. (1990). The Breaking Point: Sedan and the Fall of France, 1940. Archon Books. ISBN 978-0-208-02281-3.
- Doughty, Robert A.; Flint, Roy K.; Gruber, Ira D. (1995). Warfare in the Western World: Military Operations from 1600 to 1871. Vol. I. D.C. Heath. ISBN 978-0-669-20939-6.
- Doughty, Robert A.; Flint, Roy K. (1995). Warfare in the Western World: Military Operations Since 1871. Vol. II. Cengage Learning. ISBN 978-0-669-20940-2.
- Doughty, Robert A. (2005). Pyrrhic Victory: French Strategy and Operations in the Great War. Belknap. ISBN 978-0-674-01880-8.
- Doughty, Robert A. (2015). Strength and Drive: The West Point Class of 1965. AurthorHouse. ISBN 978-1-4969.
