= Mark Grimsley =

American historian (born 1959)

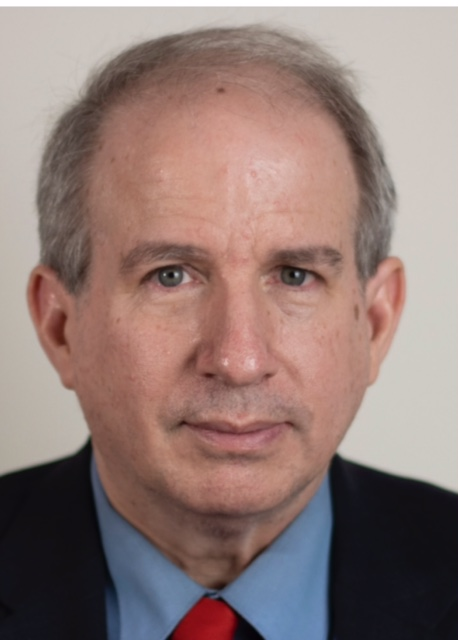
Mark Grimsley

Mark Grimsley (born October 8, 1959, Ahoskie, North Carolina, United States) is an American professor of History at Ohio State University. His 1995 book, The Hard Hand of War: Union Military Policy Toward Southern Civilians 1861-1865, earned second place in the Gilder Lehrman Lincoln Prize category.

== Education ==
Grimsley earned his B.A. in History at The Ohio State University in 1982, M.A. in War Studies at King's College London in 1985, and Ph.D. in History at The Ohio State University in 1992.

== Career ==
Although primarily an academic historian, Grimsley has written extensively in magazines of popular history. In 1980 he published his first article, in Civil War Times Illustrated. He has since published over sixty articles for general readers.

After earning his doctorate, the History Department at Ohio State University hired Grimsley as an assistant professor. Grimsley attained the rank of associate professor in 1997. In 1999 he received the Ohio State University Alumni Distinguished Teaching Award for excellence in the classroom.

From 2008 to 2010, Grimsley received a visiting professor appointment to the United States Army War College as the Harold Keith Johnson Chair of Military History. At the conclusion of his Army War College appointment he received the Department of the Army Outstanding Civilian Service Award. Grimsley served as an adjunct professor at the University of Illinois at Urbana-Champaign from 1999 to 2007.

The Mark Grimsley Social Media Fellowship, which underwrites the provision of a stipend for the graduate student who manages the Twitter feed of the Society for Military History and sits on that organization's Social Media Committee, is named for Grimsley in recognition of his pioneering involvement with academic blogging and other social media.

=== Research interests ===
Grimsley is a military historian with a main concentration in the U.S. Civil War. His thematic emphases include race and war in the American military experience as well as the problem of moral judgment in war.

==== Publications ====
Books

- Civilians in the Path of War. University of Nebraska Press, 2002. Co-edited with Clifford J. Rogers.
- And Keep Moving On: The Virginia Campaign, May–June 1864. University of Nebraska Press, 2002.
- The Collapse of the Confederacy. University of Nebraska Press, 2001. Co-edited with Brooks D. Simpson.
- The Hard Hand of War: Union Military Policy Toward Southern Civilians, 1861-1865. Cambridge University Press, 1995.

Articles

- "In Not So Dubious Battle: The Motivations of Civil War Soldiers," Journal of Military History 62 (January 1998): 175–188.
- "Why the Civil Rights Movement Was an Insurgency," MHQ: The Quarterly Journal of Military History 22 Spring 2010), 34–45.
- ""Wars for the American South: The First and Second Reconstructions Considered as Insurgencies." Civil War History 58 (March 2012): 6–36.
- "Prejudice Against Popular History: The Costs and Benefits of Holding the Course." Historically Speaking 13 (December 4, 2012): 9–11.

Book Chapters and Essays

- "“Playing a Very Bold Game: The Organizational Culture of the Army of Northern Virginia, 1862-1865,” in Peter Mansoor and Williamson Murray (eds.) The Culture of Military Organizations (Cambridge University Press, 2019): 79–99.
- “The Lincoln-McClellan Relationship in Myth and Memory.” Journal of the Abraham Lincoln Association 38:2 (Summer 2017): 63–81.
- “The Franco-American Alliance during the War for Independence,” in Peter Mansoor and Williamson Murray, eds., Grand Strategy and Military Alliances (New York: Cambridge University Press, 2016), 254–283.
- “Lincoln as Commander in Chief: Forays into Generalship,” in Stephen D. Engle, ed., The War Worth Fighting: Abraham Lincoln’s Presidency and Civil War America (Gainesville: University Press of Florida, 2015): 62–87.
- "“Wars for the American South: The First and Second Reconstructions Considered as Insurgencies,” Civil War History 58:1 (March 2012): 6–36.
- "Success and Failure in Civil War Armies: Clues from Organizational Culture," in Warfare and Culture in World History, ed. Wayne E. Lee (New York: New York University Press, 2011), 115–141.
- "'A Lack of Confidence': Benjamin F. Butler,” in Steven E. Woodworth, ed. Grant’s Lieutenants: From Chattanooga to Appomattox (Lawrence: University Press of Kansas, 2008), 105–132.
- "'More Than ‘A First Rate Clerk’: Henry W. Halleck," in Steven E. Woodworth, ed. Grant’s Lieutenants: From Chattanooga to Appomattox (Lawrence: University Press of Kansas, 2008), 195–216.
- "Remorseless, Revolutionary Struggle: A People’s War," in Aaron Sheehan-Dean, ed. Struggle for a Vast Future: The American Civil War. Foreword by James M. McPherson (London and New York: Osprey, 2006), 97–112.
- "'A Very Long Shadow': Race, Atrocity, and the American Civil War," in Gregory J.W. Urwin, ed., Black Flag Over Dixie: Racial Atrocities and Reprisals in the Civil War (Carbondale: Southern Illinois University Press, 2004), 231–244.

Other
Grimsley maintains an academic blog titled Blog Them Out of the Stone Age and contributes to a blog titled Civil Warriors with Ethan Rafuse.

== Personal interest ==
Diagnosed with bipolar disorder in 1986, Grimsley converses openly about his illness, and maintained a blog, Facing the Demon, dedicated to furthering discussion of the illness.
