= Treaty of Paris (24 February 1812) =

1812 treaty between France and Prussia

The Treaty of Paris of 24 February 1812 between Napoleon I of France and Frederick William III of Prussia established a Franco-Prussian alliance directed against Russia. On 24 June, Prussia joined the French invasion of Russia. The unpopular alliance broke down when the Prussian contingent in French service signed a separate armistice, the Convention of Tauroggen, with Russia on 30 December 1812. On 17 March 1813, Frederick William declared war on France and issued his famous proclamation "To My People".

According to East German historiography, the Franco-Prussian alliance strengthened the hand of the monarchy and nobility against social and national movements. In the end, however, the action of the masses—disarming retreating French troops; collecting money, food and clothes for Russian prisoners; clashing with French troops—were definitive in ending it.

== Background ==
By 1811 both France and Russia were preparing for war. Early in the year a Russian approach to Prussia for an alliance was rejected, but the prospect of French soldiers using Prussia as a launching point for an invasion of Russia changed Frederick William's mind. In October, General Gerhard von Scharnhorst went to Saint Petersburg and informed the Russians that Prussia was in talks with France and asked for a military alliance. A Russo-Prussian military convention was then signed in secret. Russia promised to come to Prussia's aid in the event of a French invasion, but Prussia was obliged not to defend most of her territory but to make a stand on the Vistula. Scharnhorst then approached the Austrians in Vienna for an alliance and was rebuffed. Tsar Alexander I then informed Frederick William that unless his generals received complete cooperation, Prussia would be abolished in the coming war. The Prussian foreign minister, Karl August von Hardenberg, tried to convince the king to sign a public alliance with Russia, but the king refused, remarking that, "all of this reminds me of 1805 and 1806, when the Tsar's court was seized with the same excitement. I am afraid that the final result will again be an ill-conceived war that brings misfortune to Russia's friends instead of delivering them from the yoke that oppresses them." After the tsar's stern warning and the Austrian rejection, Hardenberg again proposed an alliance to France. In January 1812, General Gebhard Leberecht von Blücher resigned his commission, refusing to fight for France.

== Treaty and effect ==
The treaty of alliance was signed at Paris on 24 February 1812. Prussia was to open its borders to French troops and to provide the Grande Armée with 20,842 auxiliary troops, plus provisions, including thousands of packhorses and wagons. This was almost half of the Prussian Army, since the Convention of Paris of 8 September 1808—essentially a codicil to the Treaty of Tilsit of 9 July 1807—capped its strength at 42,000 men. Prussia was also promised small territorial compensation at Russia's expense. With French troops massing on the border, Frederick William ratified the treaty on 5 March. Had he not, France would have certainly invaded Prussia. The Franco-Austrian alliance signed March was much less demanding of the Austrians, who went behind Napoleon's back to inform the Russians that they intended to avoid combat as much as possible.

Following the ratification, over 300 officers—a quarter of the Prussian officer corps—resigned their commissions, most going into exile in Russia, some to Spain or England. Scharnhorst, who had presided over the Prussian military reforms, resigned as Chief of the General Staff and moved to Silesia, remaining one of the king's military advisors. His assistants Carl von Clausewitz, the military writer, and Hermann von Boyen left for Russia. General August Neidhardt von Gneisenau was scathing of the king: "We shall receive the fate we deserve. We shall go down in shame, for we dare not conceal from ourselves the truth that a nation is as bad as its government. The king stands ever by the throne on which he has never sat." Gneisenau resigned and went to England. The head of the Prussian police, Justus Gruner, joined the émigré Baron vom Stein in exile in Prague and was imprisoned by the Austrians for his own safety. He had been charged with stirring up anti-French sentiment in Prussia prior to the publication of the treaty. Following the outbreak of war, Stein moved from Prague to Saint Petersburg. All these officers pinned their hopes on the example of the successful Spanish uprising of 1808 and the prospects of a "sixth coalition" funded by Britain.

== Prussia in the Russian campaign ==
In the initial phase of the invasion of Russia, the Prussian contingent was led by Julius von Grawert, an admirer of Napoleon. He covered the French north flank along the Baltic coast, but soon fell ill. His replacement, Hans David von Yorck, was unenthusiastic for the French alliance. When his superior, Marshal Jacques MacDonald, ordered him to fortify the city of Memel, he refused on the grounds that such an action was not covered by the treaty. During the Siege of Riga, Yorck tried to exchange prisoners with Russia only to find that most of his captured men had joined the German Legion, a unit in Russian service patronised by Gneisenau and Stein. Throughout October and November Yorck was received letters from Russia beseeching him to change sides. In October, the Austrian foreign minister, Klemens von Metternich, proposed an Austro-Prussian agreement to force the French back behind the Rhine, but the Prussian government was still committed to the French alliance at that time.

In East Prussia, General Friedrich Wilhelm von Bülow began forming a force in reserve and preventing troops and supplies from reinforcing the front. Recruits and horses were congregated in Königsberg, the capital of East Prussia, while supplies were sent to Graudenz. All reservists and soldiers on furlough in East and West Prussia were recalled and formed into reserve battalions under Colonel August von Thümen. On 14 December the Grande Armée abandoned Russian territory, but many in Berlin, including Frederick William, did not believe that Napoleon's defeat could be as bad as it was. On 15 December the king received a letter from Napoleon requesting him to raise further troops for the front. The Prussian government complied. On 19 December King Joachim Murat of Naples, recently appointed commander of the Grande Armée, set up his headquarters in Königsberg. On 24 December Frederick William authorised Bülow to create a reserve corps on the Vistula, since Yorck could take over East and West Prussia on his return from Russia. Bülow succeeded in keeping his troops and his supplies out of Murat's command, but the intendant-général Comte Daru, charged with provisioning the Grande Armée, noted that all of Prussia's recent actions did no benefit to France. On 30 December, without permission from the king and surrounded by the Russians, Yorck signed the armistice of Tauroggen. Although his capitulation has often been regarded as the start of Germany's "war of liberation" from Napoleon, Yorck was initially disavowed by his government. As Russian troops poured into East Prussia, Berlin demanded the restoration of territories lost at Tilsit in 1807 and the payment of 90 million francs owed for supplies to continue the alliance. France rejected the demand, and Prussia was in no position to fight France. France occupied all of Prussia's great fortresses and had 25,000 troops in Berlin under Marshal Pierre Augereau at the time.

On 6 January 1813, the king informed Bülow, who had withdrawn his men from Königsberg towards Neuenburg and Schwetz, of Yorck's dismissal and ordered him not to have contact with him or to link up with him. On 8–9 January, Murat sent letters to Bülow demanding that he attach his reserve corps to the French in accordance with the treaty. On 10 January, Bülow claimed that his recruits were not capable of offering battle and that his government had ordered him to move westward. The next day, a force of reservists organised by Thümen at Graudenz joined Bülow's force and together they moved west towards Neu-Stettin, there to join a corps of 6,000 being formed by General Karl Ludwig von Borstell. On 12 January, Bülow's rearguard was surrounded at Neuenburg by Cossacks under General Alexander Chernyshov. The Russians merely arrested three officers and let the rest go. By the time Bülow learned of the incident on 14 January, the Cossacks were camped in the streets of Osche in a tense standoff with the Prussians, who were in the barns and stables. When Bülow threatened to attack, Chernyshov released the Prussians, who arrived at Neu-Stettin on 17 January.

As knowledge of the magnitude of Napoleon's defeat grew, Berlin sought to revive Metternich's proposal of October. On 12 January, Karl Friedrich von dem Knesebeck arrived in Vienna to negotiate an Austro-Prussian neutrality agreement that was designed to force a Franco-Russian peace. Knesebeck was instructed to get Austrian approval for a Russo-Prussian agreement and a Prussian exit from the war in the event that the Austrians were unwilling at that moment to abandon Napoleon. Metternich was unwilling to sign anything, but he gave his word that Austria approved of a Russo-Prussian truce. On 4 February, in a sign of the desperation felt in Berlin, Friedrich Ancillon, Frederick William's counsellor, proposed that Prussia mediate between France and Russia, in return for which the former would receive control of the Confederation of the Rhine and the latter would be ceded East Prussia.

On 21 January, Frederick William fled Berlin for Breslau, arriving four days later. This did not dampen Napoleon's hopes that the Prussians would uphold their treaty and defend their border from Russia, although there were signs that the Prussian army was increasingly controlled by rebels. On 29 January, Hardenberg promised Napoleon that a new Prussian corps would be formed immediately under the command of Bülow.

== Sources ==
- Adams, Michael (2006). Napoleon and Russia. London: Bloomsbury Academic.
- Dorpalen, Andreas (1969). "The German Struggle against Napoleon: The East German View". The Journal of Modern History. 41 (4): 485–516. doi:10.1086/240444. S2CID 144549538.
- Koch, Hannsjoachim W. (2014) [1978]. A History of Prussia. Oxford: Routledge.
- Leggiere, Michael V. (2002). Napoleon and Berlin: The Franco-Prussian War in North Germany, 1813. University of Oklahoma Press.
- Rowe, Michael (2003). From Reich to State: The Rhineland in the Revolutionary Age, 1780–1830. Cambridge: Cambridge University Press.
- Rowe, Michael (2013). "The French Revolution, Napoleon, and Nationalism in Europe". In Breuilly, John (ed.). The Oxford Handbook of the History of Nationalism. Oxford: Oxford University Press. pp. 127–48.
- Schmidt, Oliver H. (2003). Prussian Regular Infantryman, 1808–15. Oxford: Osprey.
