= Alexander Watson (historian) =

British historian (born 1979)

Alexander J. Watson
- Awards: Wolfson History Prize (2014), Guggenheim-Lehrman Prize in Military History (2014)

Academic background
- Education: Balliol College, Oxford
- Thesis: The chances of survival: personal risk assessment and attitudes to death among German and British soldiers in the Great War, 1914–1918 (2005)
- Doctoral advisor: Niall Ferguson

Academic work
- Institutions: Goldsmiths, University of London
- Main interests: East-Central Europe, Germany and Britain during World War I.
- Notable works: The Fortress: The Great Siege of Przemysl (2019), Ring of Steel: Germany and Austria-Hungary at War, 1914–1918 (2014)

Alexander James Watson (born 1979) is a British historian. He is the author of three books, which focus on East-Central Europe, Germany and Britain during World War I. His most recent book, The Fortress: The Great Siege of Przemysl was praised by The Times newspaper as a "masterpiece". His previous book, Ring of Steel: Germany and Austria-Hungary at War, 1914-1918, won numerous awards. Currently Watson is Professor of History at Goldsmiths, University of London.

== Education ==
Watson attended the Merchant Taylors' School, Northwood from 1992 to 1997. In 2000, he received his Bachelor of Arts (hons) degree in Modern history from Exeter College, Oxford. He worked as a research assistant for Niall Ferguson for a year before starting his doctoral degree under Ferguson's supervision in 2001 at Balliol College, Oxford. He completed his thesis titled The chances of survival: personal risk assessment and attitudes to death among German and British soldiers in the Great War, 1914–1918 in 2005. From 2005 to 2008, he was a Clare Hall, Cambridge Research Fellow. For three years, starting in 2008, Watson was a British Academy Postdoctoral Fellow at the University of Cambridge. In 2010, he was a College Research Associate at St. John's College, Cambridge, and from 2011 to 2013 a Marie Curie Intra-European Fellow at the University of Warsaw in Poland.

== Career ==
Watson's first book, Enduring the Great War; Combat, Morale and Collapse in the German armies (1914–1918), began as his doctoral thesis in October 2001. It was published by Cambridge University Press in 2008. The book focuses on the psyche of German and British soldiers in World War I and attempts to understand how they were able to fight for all those years. In 2006, it was awarded the Fraenkel Prize from the Institute of Contemporary History and Wiener Library.

In August 2014, Watson's second book, Ring of Steel: Germany and Austria-Hungary at War (1914–1918) was published. To write the book, he spent two years researching archives in Poland, Germany, and Austria. His reason for writing the book was to better understand the war from the perspective of the Central Powers' leaders and their peoples; how they were able to endure suffering and commit crimes that would later lead to "even greater horrors of totalitarian dictatorship, a second world war and genocide". The book received many accolades. It was awarded The Sunday Times 2014 History Book of the Year, the 2015 Distinguished Book Award from the Society for Military History, and the 2015 British Army Military Book of the Year. On 23 March 2015 Watson was awarded the second annual 2014 Guggenheim-Lehrman Prize in Military History (now the Gilder Lehrman Prize for Military History at the New-York Historical Society), and received $50,000. The award is given to the best book in the field of military history published during the previous calendar year. During a ceremony on 14 May 2015, Watson received the Wolfson History Prize for Ring of Steel. Along with this prize, Watson was also awarded £25,000.

The Fortress: The Great Siege of Przemysl, Watson's most recent book, was released in October 2019. This is the story of the First World War's longest siege, and of the opening of the brutal tragedy which befell East-Central Europe during the twentieth century. It follows a Habsburg garrison of old soldiers defending the city from Russian attack, and recounts the fighting, starvation and anti-Semitic ethnic cleansing which began in the region already in 1914. The book was a finalist for the 2019 Gilder Lehrman Prize for Military History.

Watson has written for The New York Times, Times Higher Education, and History Today. He has been interviewed for BBC Radio programmes, "World War One" and "Good Morning, Scotland", and appeared on the German Channel's documentary, "The Search for the Lost Sons. One Hundred Years of the First World War".

== Publications ==
Books

- The Fortress: The Great Siege of Przemysl, 2019, ISBN 978-0241309063
- Ring of Steel: Germany and Austria-Hungary at War, 1914–1918, 2014, ISBN 978-1846142215
- Enduring the Great War. Combat, Morale and Collapse in the German and British armies, 1914–1918, 2008, ISBN 978-0521881012

Articles

- "'Revolutionary Mass Propaganda': The German Communist Party, The Reichstag Election and Extra-Parliamentary Struggle in the Summer of 1932’, 'Central European History', 2025, ISSN 1569-1616
- "Managing an 'Army of Peoples': Identity, Command and Performance in the Habsburg Officer Corps, 1914-1918", Contemporary European History, 2016, ISSN 0960-7773
- "'Unheard of Brutality': Russian Atrocities against Civilians in East Prussia, 1914–1915", The Journal of Modern History, 2014, ISSN 0022-2801
- "Fighting for Another Fatherland: the Polish Minority in the German Army, 1914–1918", The English Historical Review, 2011, ISSN 0013-8266
- "Bereaved and Aggrieved: Combat Motivation and the Ideology of Sacrifice in the First World War", Historical Research, 2010, ISSN 1468-2281
- "Culture and Combat in the Western World, 1900–1945", The Historical Journal, 2008, ISSN 0018-246X
- "Junior Officership in the German Army during the Great War, 1914–1918", War in History, 2007, ISSN 0968-3445
- "Self-Deception and Survival: Mental Coping Strategies on the Western Front, 1914–1918", Journal of Contemporary History, 2006, ISSN 0022-0094
- "For Kaiser and Reich": the Identity and Fate of the German Volunteers, 1914–1918", War in History, 2005, ISSN 0968-3445
