= Ira D. Gruber =

American military historian (1934–2025)

Ira Dempsey Gruber (January 6, 1934 – September 24, 2025) was an American author, bibliographer and military historian of the American Revolution.

== Background ==
Ira Dempsey Gruber was born January 6, 1934, in Philadelphia, Pennsylvania, and grew up in Pottstown, Pennsylvania. He attended Duke University and served in the United States Navy Reserve. From 1955–1957, he held the title of crypto security officer on the USS Wiltsie.

Gruber died on September 24, 2025, at the age of 91.

== Career ==
Gruber became a professor at Duke after earning his Ph.D. in 1961. He later held the positions of fellow at the Institute of Early American History and Culture, assistant professor of history at Occidental College, and Harris Masterson, Jr. Professor—and later (from 2009 on) Professor Emeritus—of History at Rice University.

During his long teaching career, Gruber published several works on the theme of American military history, specifically regarding the American Revolution. Books and the British Army in the Age of the American Revolution examines the books read by military officers during the revolution and how these books may have influenced their techniques and decisions. Another book, The Howe Brothers and the American Revolution, discusses the failure of the Howe Brothers to restore the British government in America.

== Awards ==
- 1974 and 2001 George R. Brown Award for Superior Teaching, Rice University
- 1998 Edwin H. Simmons Award given by Society for Military History
- 2013 Samuel Eliot Morison Prize for lifetime achievement given by Society for Military History

== Works ==
- Gruber, Ira D. (2010). Books and the British Army in the Age of the American Revolution. Chapel Hill: University of North Carolina Press. ISBN 9780807833780. OCLC 676697361.
- Gruber, Ira D. (1975). The Howe Brothers and the American Revolution. New York: University of North Carolina Press. ISBN 0393007561. OCLC 333567.
- Gruber, Ira D. (1998). John Peebles' American war : the diary of a Scottish grenadier, 1776-1782. Mechanicsburg, PA: Stackpole Books. ISBN 0811708810. OCLC 39782957.
- Doughty, Robert A.; Gruber, Ira D. (1996). Warfare in the Western World: Military Operations. Lexington: D.C. Heath, cop. ISBN 0669209392. OCLC 469055793.
- Moten, Matthew, ed. (2011). "1". Between War and Peace: How America Ends its Wars. New York: Free Press. ISBN 978-1439194614. OCLC 555638109.
- Heller, Charles E.; Stofft, William A., eds. (1986). "1". America's First Battles 1776-1965. Lawrence: University Press of Kansas. ISBN 0700602771. OCLC 13425151.
- Hagan, Kenneth J.; Roberts, William R., eds. (1986). "2". Against All Enemies: Interpretations of American Military History from Colonial Times to Present. Westport, Connecticut: Greenwood Press, Inc. ISBN 0313211973. OCLC 12342367.
