= Benjamin Franklin Cooling =

- Born: Benjamin Franklin Cooley III; 8 December 1938 (age 87); Washington, D.C.
- Occupation: Historian
- Notable work: Benjamin Franklin Tracy: father of the modern American fighting Navy; Gray steel and blue water Navy : the formative years of America's military-industrial complex, 1881–1917.

Benjamin Franklin Cooling III (born 8 December 1938) is a professor of national security studies at Dwight D. Eisenhower School for National Security and Resource Strategy at the National Defense University in Washington, D.C. He is the author of more than a dozen books on the American Civil War, including a trilogy on the defense of the District of Columbia, a biography of Secretary of the Navy Benjamin Franklin Tracy, and most recently Jubal Early: Robert E. Lee's Bad Old Man.

== Family and education ==
Benjamin Cooling was born in New Brunswick, New Jersey, on 8 December 1938, the son of Benjamin F. Cooling II (1895–1959) and his wife, Helena E. née Weisshaar (1899–1981). His father was a research chemist by profession, and worked in both the private and public sector. While attending Coolidge High School in Washington, D.C., he was cadet colonel in a junior ROTC program and a star athlete in football and track 1955–1957. He received his Bachelor of Arts from Rutgers University, where he sang in the Glee Club, participated in the Scarlet Rifles (Army drill team), helped organize a Civil War Round Table with Earl Schenk Myers, was a dorm proctor, member of the Phi Sigma Kappa fraternity and the History Club. He received his Master of Arts and Ph.D. from the University of Pennsylvania and wrote his doctoral dissertation, 'Benjamin Franklin Tracy: Lawyer, Soldier, Secretary of the Navy', in 1969.

== Career ==
Cooling's professional career spanned 60 years as a U.S. civil servant with the National Park Service, Department of Energy and Departments of the Army, Air Force and Defense. He served in the U.S. Army Reserve, from 1956 to 1963. He has taught at the University of Pennsylvania, PMC Colleges, George Washington University, U.S. Army War College and retired as Professor of National Security and Resourcing Strategy at the National Defense University. He is a former officer and trustee of the Society for Military History and received the Society's Victor Gondos Memorial Service Award. He is a past Fellow of the Company of Military Historians; he held an advanced research fellowship from the Naval War College in 1974. He has received the Joint Meritorious Civilian Service Award from the Joint Chiefs of Staff, Department of Defense, the Distinguished Research Award from the Industrial College of the Armed Forces, the Douglas Southall Freeman award from the Military Order of the Stars and Bars, the Fletcher Pratt award from the New York Civil War Round Table, and the Moncado award from the American Military Institute for his scholarship.

Cooling is a national security and Civil War historian, educator, and lecturer who has published twenty-two books and over one hundred articles on aspects of military, naval and air history. He specializes in the development of the military–industrial complex and the national security state.

== Writings ==
Cooling has published 120 works in 275 publications in 2 languages; his principal works include:

- Counter-Thrust: From the Peninsula to the Antietam, 11 editions published between 2007–2013
- To the Battles of Franklin and Nashville and Beyond: Stabilization and Reconstruction in Tennessee and Kentucky, 1864–1866, eight editions published between 1988– 2010
- Forts Henry and Donelson—The Key to the Confederate heartland, six editions published between 1987– 1997
- Symbol, Sword, and Shield: Defending Washington During the Civil War, ten editions published between 1975– 1991
- War, Business, and American Society: Historical Perspectives on the Military-Industrial Complex, 13 editions published in 1977
- The Day Lincoln was Almost Shot: The Fort Stevens Story, five editions published between 2013– 2015 in English
- Gray steel and blue water Navy: the formative years of America's military-industrial complex, 1881–1917, nine editions published between 1979– 1999
- Case studies in the development of close air support, 9 editions published between 1990– 2015
- Benjamin Franklin Tracy: Father of the Modern American Fighting Navy, five editions published in 1973
- Jubal Early's Raid on Washington, six editions published between 1989– 2007
- Jubal Early: Robert E. Lee’s Bad Old Man (2014)
