= John A. Lynn =

American historian (born 1943)

John A. Lynn II
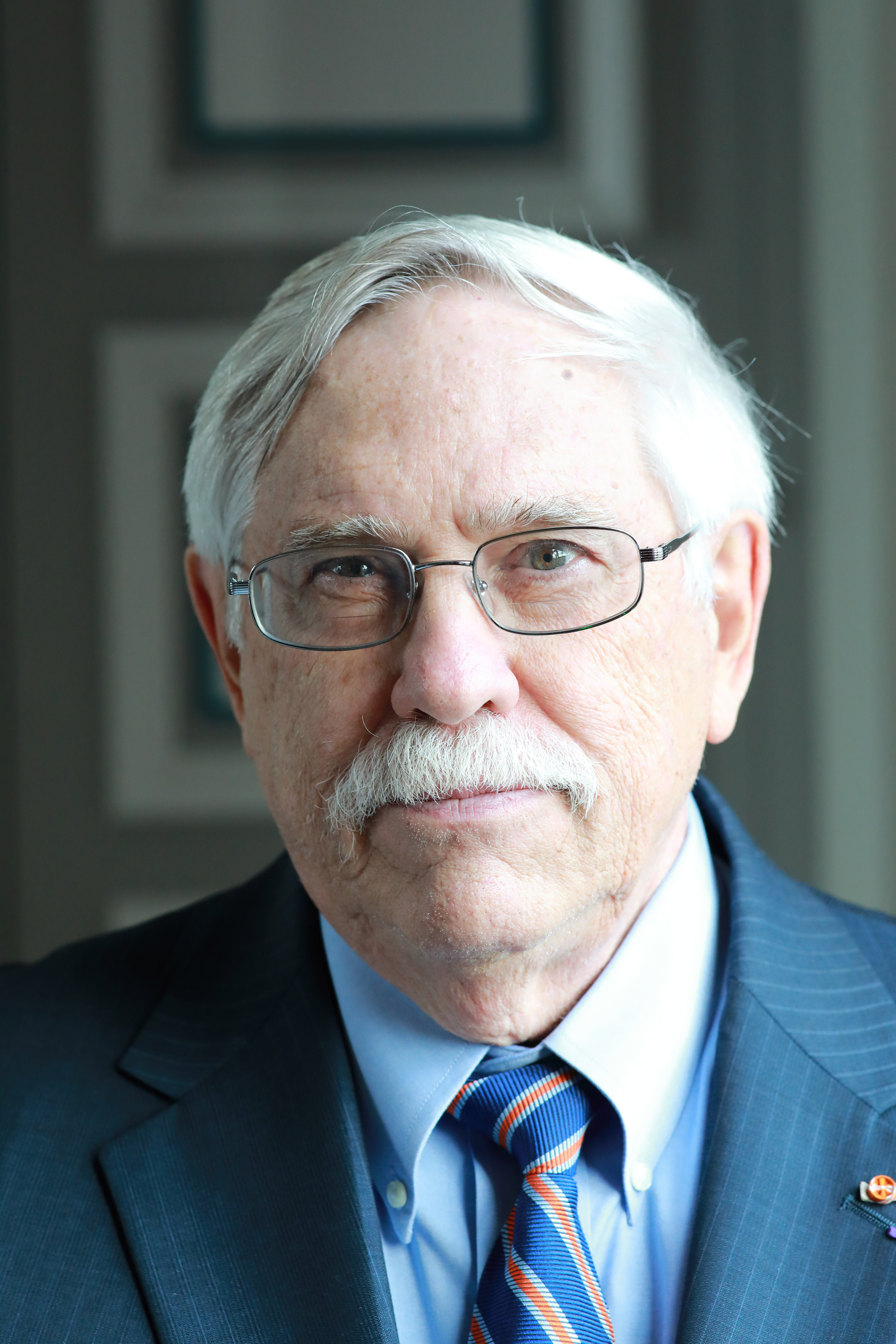
- John A. Lynn - November 2018
- Born: March 18, 1943 (age 83); Glenview, Illinois, U.S.
- Education: University of Illinois at Urbana-Champaign; University of California, Davis; UCLA
- Employer: University of Illinois at Urbana-Champaign
- Awards: Samuel Eliot Morison Prize, Ordre des Palmes Académiques, Order of Ouissam Alaouite

John Albert Lynn (born March 18, 1943) is a military historian who has written on a wide variety of topics in his field, with an emphasis on early modern Europe.

== Early life and education ==
Born in Glenview, Illinois, in 1943, he received his Bachelor of Arts degree at the University of Illinois at Urbana-Champaign (1964), his Master of Arts degree at the University of California, Davis (1967), and his Ph.D. at UCLA (1973).

== Career ==
Lynn taught briefly at Indiana University and the University of Maine, before joining the Department of History at the University of Illinois at Urbana-Champaign in 1978. During 1994-1995, he was the Oppenheimer Professor of Warfighting Strategy at the Marine Corps University at Marine Corps Base Quantico in Virginia. Retiring from the University of Illinois in 2009, he taught for three years at Northwestern University as Distinguished Professor of Military History. In 2012, he returned to the University of Illinois to teach part-time as Professor Emeritus of History and in the Department of Political Science, which he has continued to do up to the present.

== Awards ==
While at the University of Illinois, Lynn received several teaching awards, including the Campus Award for Excellence in Undergraduate Teaching in 2001.

He served as president of the United States Commission on Military History (2003-2007) and vice-president of the Society for Military History (2005-2007).

He has been awarded two foreign decorations: the French Ordre des Palmes Académiques at the rank of chevalier (2004) and the Moroccan Order of Ouissam Alaouite at the rank of commandeur (2006).

In 2017, he received the Samuel Eliot Morison Prize from the Society for Military History. This award is given in recognition of career accomplishments and contributions; it is the highest award granted by the Society. In August 2017, Lynn was awarded a NEH Public Scholar Grant to fund research and writing on a history of surrender.

== Bibliography ==
- Leaving the Fight: Surrender, Prisoners of War, and Detainees in Western Warfare (Cambridge University Press, 2025)
- Another Kind of War: An Introduction to the History of Terrorism (Yale University Press, 2019)
  - Une Autre Guerre: Histoire et Nature du Terrorisme (Passe/Compose, 2021)
- Women, Armies, and Warfare in Early Modern Europe (Cambridge University Press, 2008) ISBN 0-521-89765-3 OCLC 232656888
- Battle: A History of Combat and Culture (Westview Press, 2003) ISBN 0-813-33372-5 OCLC 58548315
  - Paperback: Basic Books 2004, ISBN 978-0813333724
  - De la guerre: Une histoire du combat et des origines à nos jours (Tallandier, 2006)
- The French Wars 1667-1714: the Sun King at War. (Osprey Publishing, 2002) ISBN 1-841-76361-6 OCLC 50101401
- The Wars of Louis XIV, 1667–1714 (Longman, 1999)
  - Les guerres de Louis XIV, 1667-1714, traduction Perrin 2010, ISBN 978-2-262-02456-7
- Giant of the Grand Siècle: The French Army, 1610–1715 (Cambridge University Press, 1997)
- The Bayonets of the Republic: Motivation and Tactics in the Army of Revolutionary France, 1791–94 (Westview Press, 1996)
- (editor) Feeding Mars: Logistics in Western Warfare from the Middle Ages to the Present (Westview Press, 1993) ISBN 0-813-31865-3 OCLC 26307640
- (editor) The Tools of War: Ideas, Instruments, and Institutions of Warfare, 1445–1871 (University of Illinois Press, 1990)
