= Braddock's Defeat: The Battle of the Monongahela and the Road to Revolution =

Book by David L. Preston

- Author: David L. Preston
- Series: Pivotal moments in American history
- Publisher: Oxford University Press
- Publication date: 2015
- Pages: xvii, 460 pages, 16 unnumbered pages of plates
- Awards: 2015 Guggenheim-Lehrman Prize in Military History
- ISBN: 9780199845323

Braddock's Defeat: The Battle of the Monongahela and the Road to Revolution is a 2015 book by David L. Preston and published by Oxford University Press that details the events around the Battle of the Monongahela.

== Awards ==
It was the 2015 recipient of the Guggenheim-Lehrman Prize in Military History.

It was also the 2016 recipient of the Distinguished Book Award from the Society for Military History.
