= Ring of Steel (book) =

Book by Alexander Watson

Ring of Steel: Germany and Austria-Hungary at War, 1914–1918
- First edition (UK)
- Author: Alexander Watson
- Language: English
- Subject: World War I
- Genre: military history
- Publisher: Allen Lane (UK); Basic Books (US)
- Publication date: 2014
- Pages: xv, 787 pages, 16 pages of plates
- Awards: 2014 recipient of the Wolfson History Prize, the 2015 Distinguished Book Award from the Society for Military History, and the 2014 Guggenheim-Lehrman Prize in Military History
- ISBN: 978-0-465-01872-7
- OCLC: 870986745

Ring of Steel: Germany and Austria-Hungary at War, 1914–1918 is a book on World War I by Alexander Watson.

== Critical reception ==
A reviewer for The Wall Street Journal described Watson's book as making "a truly indispensable contribution in allowing us to see from the inside out this disastrous alliance between Austria and imperial Germany." Historian Ben Shephard writing for The Guardian described it as "the most important of the current crop of books" on World War I.

== Awards ==
The book was the 2014 recipient of the Wolfson History Prize, the 2015 Distinguished Book Award from the Society for Military History, and the 2014 Guggenheim-Lehrman Prize in Military History.
