= Brooks D. Simpson =

American historian (born 1957)

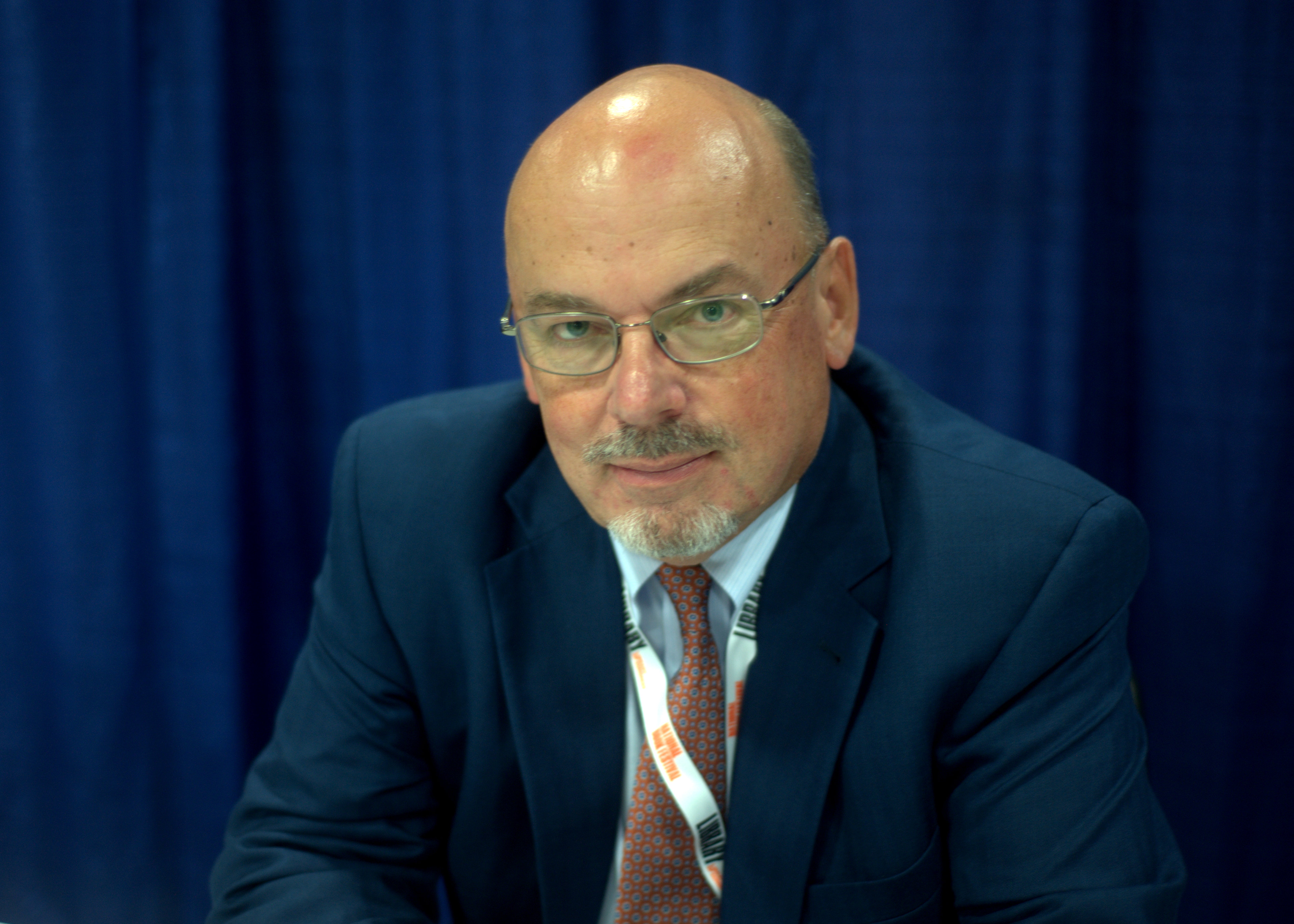
- Simpson in 2018
- Born: Brooks Donohue Simpson; August 4, 1957 (age 69); Nassau County, New York, U.S.
- Education: Phillips Exeter Academy
- Alma mater: University of Virginia; University of Wisconsin–Madison
- Occupation: Historian
- Known for: Studies of the American Civil War
- Website: cwcrossroads.wordpress.com

Brooks Donohue Simpson (born August 4, 1957) is an American historian and an ASU Foundation Professor of History at Arizona State University, specializing in American political and military history, especially the American Civil War and Reconstruction eras and the American presidency.

== Early life and education ==
Simpson was born in 1957 in Freeport, New York. He grew up in Seaford, New York, and Cold Spring Harbor, New York. Educated at the Phillips Exeter Academy, he graduated in 1975; four years later he graduated from the University of Virginia. Receiving his M.A. in history at the University of Wisconsin–Madison in 1982, he earned his PhD in 1989.

== Career ==
After working three years as an assistant editor for The Papers of Andrew Johnson, based at the University of Tennessee, Simpson joined the faculty at Wofford College in Spartanburg, South Carolina, in 1987. Three years later, in 1990, he migrated west to Arizona State University, where he presently teaches. Currently he divides his time between Barrett, The Honors College at ASU and the College of Integrative Sciences and Arts.

External videos
- Booknotes interview with Simpson on Ulysses S. Grant: Triumph Over Adversity, 1822-1865, July 16, 2000, C-SPAN

Simpson is the author of seven books, the coauthor of two more, and the editor or coeditor of eight other books. He is perhaps best known for his work on Ulysses S. Grant, including Let Us Have Peace: Ulysses S. Grant and the Politics of War and Reconstruction, 1861-1868 (1991), and Ulysses S. Grant: Triumph over Adversity, 1822-1865 (2000). The latter was a New York Times Notable Book and a Choice Outstanding Academic Title for 2000. He has appeared several times on C-SPAN, as well as on PBS's American Experience. In 2009 the U.S. State Department asked him to travel to Turkey for two weeks to lecture on Abraham Lincoln and Barack Obama in historical context.

=== Blogging ===
After serving four years as one of the contributors to the prize-winning "Civil Warriors" blog, in late 2010, Simpson started his own blog, "Crossroads", where he discusses the American Civil War and offers critiques of negationist neo-Confederate and Lost Cause claims regarding the war.

== Personal life ==
Simpson is descended from Richard Denton, a reverend from Yorkshire, England.

== Honors and awards ==
- NEH Travel to Collections Award, 1990;
- Huntington Library Fellow, 1991;
- Newberry Library Fellow, 1991;
- American Philosophical Society Grant, 1991;
- Dirksen Congressional Research Center Grant, 1991;
- Father Smith Lecturer, Gonzaga University, 1994;
- American Council of Learned Societies Fellowship, 1994;
- Fulbright Scholarship, Leiden University, 1995;
- Interdisciplinary Fellow, ASU, 1998;
- ASU Alumni Faculty Research Award, 2003.

== Bibliography ==
- Advice After Appomattox: Letters to Andrew Johnson, 1865-1866. Knoxville, Tennessee: University of Tennessee Press, 1987. Edited with LeRoy P. Graf and John Muldowny.
- Let Us Have Peace: Ulysses S. Grant and the Politics of War and Reconstruction, 1861-1868. Chapel Hill, North Carolina: University of North Carolina Press, 1991. Paperback edition, 1997.
- The Political Education of Henry Adams. Columbia: University of South Carolina Press, 1996.
- America's Civil War. Wheeling, Illinois: Harlan Davidson, 1996.
- Union and Emancipation: Essays on Race and Politics in the Civil War Era. Kent, Ohio: Kent State University Press, 1997. Edited with David W. Blight.
- Think Anew, Act Anew: Abraham Lincoln on Slavery, Emancipation, and Reconstruction. Wheeling, Illinois: Harlan Davidson, 1998.
- The Reconstruction Presidents. Lawrence, Kansas: University Press of Kansas, 1998. Paperback edition, 2009.
- Sherman's Civil War: Selected Correspondence of William T. Sherman, 1860-1865. Chapel Hill, North Carolina: University of North Carolina Press, 1999. With Jean V. Berlin.
- Gettysburg: A Battlefield Guide. Lincoln, Nebraska: University of Nebraska Press, 1999. With Mark Grimsley.
- Ulysses S. Grant: Triumph Over Adversity, 1822-1865. Boston and New York: Houghton Mifflin, 2000.
- Collapse of the Confederacy. Lincoln: University of Nebraska–Lincoln, 2001. Paperback edition, 2002. With Mark Grimsley.
- The Civil War: The First Year in the Words of Those Who Lived It. New York: Library of America, 2011. With Stephen W. Sears and Aaron Sheehan-Dean.
- The Civil War in the East: Struggle, Stalemate, and Victory. Santa Barbara, California: Praeger, 2011.
- Victors in Blue: How Union Generals Fought the Confederates, Battled Each Other, and Won the Civil War. Lawrence, Kansas: University Press of Kansas, 2011. With Albert Castel.
- The Civil War: The Third Year in the Words of Those Who Lived It. New York: Library of America, 2013.
- Reconstruction: Voices from America's First Great Struggle for Racial Equality. New York: Library of America, 2018.
- An Illustrated History of the Civil War: The Conflict that Defined the United States. London: Arcturus, 2021.

== See also ==
- William C. Davis
- James M. McPherson
