= Northern Great Plains History Conference =

The Northern Great Plains History Conference is an annual conference of history professors, graduate students, historical society experts, and other scholars interested in the history of the Great Plains states of the American Midwest. The Conference features scholarly papers by academics and advanced students on a variety of topics, especially in social history and military history, as well as regional topics regarding the Great Plains.

The annual meeting includes sessions sponsored by the Society for Military History, as well as sessions oriented to K-12 teachers.

The society confers the Larry Rowen Remele Award annually to a member who has contributed significantly to the betterment of the organization. The Society for Military History awards a "best paper" prize to graduate and undergraduate students giving the best papers at the conference.

The society is governed by a council, currently chaired by Dr. Lori Ann Lahlum of Minnesota State University - Mankato.

The Conference began in 1966 and recently passed its 50th anniversary. Previous locations and host institutions were:

- 1) 1966 Grand Forks, ND (University of North Dakota)
- 2) 1967 Winnipeg, MB (University of Manitoba)
- 3) 1968 Grand Forks, ND (University of North Dakota)
- 4) 1969 St. Cloud, MN (St. Cloud State University)
- 5) 1970 Grand Forks, ND (University of North Dakota)
- 6) 1971 Moorhead, MN (Moorhead State University)
- 7) 1972 Winnipeg, MB (University of Manitoba)
- 8) 1973 Sioux Falls, SD (University of South Dakota)
- 9) 1974 Mankato, MN (Minnesota State-Mankato)
- 10) 1975 Grand Forks, ND (University of North Dakota)
- 11) 1976 La Crosse, WI (University of Wisconsin-La Crosse)
- 12) 1977 Bismarck, ND (Bismarck State University)
- 13) 1978 Fargo, ND (North Dakota State University)
- 14) 1979 Winnipeg, MB (University of Winnipeg)
- 15) 1980 Duluth, MN (University of Minnesota-Duluth)
- 16) 1981 Sioux Falls, SD (University of South Dakota)
- 17) 1982 Bemidji, MN (Bemidji State University)
- 18) 1983 Grand Forks, ND (University of North Dakota)
- 19) 1984 Bismarck, ND (Bismarck State University)
- 20) 1985 Moorhead, MN (Moorhead State University)
- 21) 1986 Eau Claire, WI (University of Wisconsin-Eau Claire)
- 22) 1987 Sioux Falls, SD (University of South Dakota)
- 23) 1988 Eveleth, MN (Iron Range Research Center)
- 24) 1989 St. Cloud, MN (St. Cloud State University)
- 25) 1990 Grand Forks, ND (University of North Dakota)
- 26) 1991 Mankato, MN (Minnesota State-Mankato)
- 27) 1992 Fargo, ND (North Dakota State University)
- 28) 1993 Pierre, SD (South Dakota State Historical Society)
- 29) 1994 St. Paul, MN (Minnesota Historical Society)
- 30) 1995 Brandon, MB (Brandon University)
- 31) 1996 LaCrosse, WI (University of Wisconsin-LaCrosse)
- 32) 1997 Bismarck, ND (Bismarck State University)
- 33) 1998 Sioux Falls, SD (University of South Dakota)
- 34) 1999 St. Cloud, MN (St. Cloud State University)
- 35) 2000 Mankato, MN (Minnesota State-Mankato)
- 36) 2001 Grand Forks, ND (University of North Dakota)
- 37) 2002 Minneapolis, MN (Augsburg College)
- 38) 2003 Fargo, ND (North Dakota State University)
- 39) 2004 Bismarck, ND (Bismarck State University)
- 40) 2005 Eau Claire, WI (University of Wisconsin-Eau Claire)
- 41) 2006 Sioux Falls, SD (University of South Dakota)
- 42) 2007 Duluth, MN (University of Minnesota-Duluth)
- 43) 2008 Brandon, MB (Brandon University)
- 44) 2009 St. Cloud, MN (St. Cloud State University)
- 45) 2010 Grand Forks, ND (University of North Dakota)
- 46) 2011 Mankato, MN (Minnesota State-Mankato)
- 47) 2012 Fargo, ND (North Dakota State University)
- 48) 2013 Hudson, WI (Universities of Wisconsin at Eau Claire, River Falls and Stout)
- 49) 2014 Sioux Falls, SD (University of South Dakota)
- 50) 2015 Bismarck, ND (Bismarck State University)
- 51) 2016 St. Cloud, MN (St. Cloud State University)
- 52) 2017 Grand Forks, ND (University of North Dakota)
- 53) 2018 Mankato, MN (Minnesota State-Mankato)

The 2019 meeting will take place in Brandon, Manitoba in conjunction with the Western Canadian Studies Conference. The 2020 and 2021 meetings are planned for Eau Claire, Wisconsin, and Sioux Falls, South Dakota, respectively.
