= David L. Preston =

American historian, writer and professor

- Education: University of Mary Washington (BA); College of William & Mary (doctorate)
- Occupations: Historian, Writer, and Professor
- Writing career
- Subjects: French and Indian War
- Notable works: Braddock's Defeat: The Battle of the Monongahela and the Road to Revolution

David L. Preston is an American historian, writer, and professor. He is the author of two books on conflict between English colonists in North America and their French and Native American neighbors, which have won multiple awards. He currently serves as the Westvaco Professor of National Security Studies at The Citadel, The Military College of South Carolina, a post he has held since 2013.

Preston is a graduate of the University of Mary Washington, where he earned his bachelor's degree. He completed his master's and doctorate at the College of William & Mary. In 2003, he became an assistant professor at The Citadel, and in 2009, was named an associate professor.

== Awards ==
- Braddock's Defeat: The Battle of the Monongahela and the Road to Revolution (Oxford University Press, 2015) won the 2015 Guggenheim-Lehrman Prize in Military History and a 2016 Distinguished Book Award from the Society for Military History.
- The Texture Of Contact: European and Indian Settler Communities on the Frontiers of Iroquoia, 1667-1783 (University of Nebraska Press, 2009) received the 2010 Albert B. Corey Prize, for best book on American-Canadian relations as well as the 2010 Annual Archives Award for Excellence in Research from the New York State Archives.
