= Theodore Ropp =

American historian

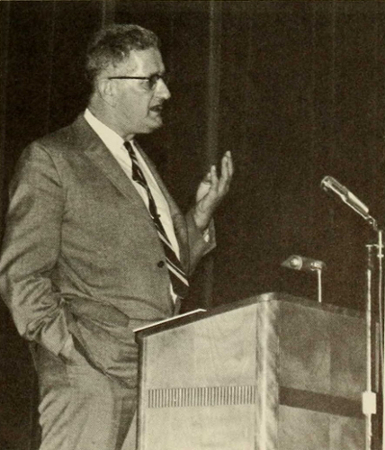
- Dr. Theodore Ropp, circa 1968
- Born: May 22, 1911; Hollywood, Illinois, US
- Died: December 2, 2000 (aged 89); Durham, North Carolina, US
- Spouse: Elizabeth Chapman

Academic background
- Education: Oberlin College; Harvard University
- Thesis: The Development of a Modern Navy (1937)
- Doctoral advisor: William L. Langer

Academic work
- Discipline: History
- Sub-discipline: Maritime history; military history
- Institutions: Duke University
- Doctoral students: Jack Granatstein
- Notable works: War in the Modern Age (1959)

Theodore Ropp (1911–2000) was an American historian who served as a professor at Duke University.

== Academic career ==
Theodore Ropp's first teaching position was as an instructor in history at Harvard University in 1937–38. In 1938, Duke University appointed him instructor in history. Remaining at Duke for the remainder of his career, he was appointed professor in 1959 and professor emeritus in 1980.

Ropp first became well known through his contribution to Edward Mead Earle's widely used book Makers of Modern Strategy, published in 1943. His chapter was on "Continental doctrines of seapower".

Ropp's expertise was in wide demand as one of the few American civilian academics working in military and naval history. He served as the Ernest J. King Professor of Maritime History at the U.S. Naval War College from 1962 to 1963. He undertook special research on compulsory military service and military conscription in the British Commonwealth. He was a member of the Army Historical Advisory Committee, in 1962–65, 1969–72. He served as director, Policy Advisory Committee, Historical Evaluation and Research Organization, from 1963, then served as chairman of the board from 1965. He was professor U.S. Military History Research Collection at the U.S. Army War College in 1972–73; visiting professor of military history U.S. Military Academy, 1976–77; visiting professor, National University of Singapore, 1980; Royal Military College, Duntroon Australia, 1980, and the University of New South Wales, 1980. In 1982–84, he was visiting professor at the University of North Carolina.

In 1991, he was awarded the Samuel Eliot Morison Prize for lifetime achievement given by the Society for Military History.

== Published works ==
- Continental Doctrines of Seapower in Edward M. Earle, ed., Makers of Modern Strategy, (Princeton University Press, 1943).
- Historical Background of the World Today: A Synopsis. Edited by Theodore Ropp with Harold T. Parker. (Rinehart, 1947).
- War in the Modern World, (Duke University Press, 1959, revised edition, Collier, 1962, new revised edition, Johns Hopkins University Press, 2000).
- Festschrift for Frederick B. Artz, edited by Theodore Ropp with David H. Pinkney (Duke University Press, 1964).
- The Historical Development of Contemporary Strategy, (U.S. Air Force Academy, 1970).
- History and War, (Hamburg Press, 1984).
- The Development of a Modern Navy: French Naval Policy, 1871-1904, by Theodore Ropp, edited by Stephen S. Roberts, (Naval Institute Press, 1987).

== Sources ==
- Gale Contemporary Authors
- Obituary
- Ropp Family Bible

Awards
Preceded by Edward M. Coffman	Samuel Eliot Morison Prize; 1991; With: I. B. Holley Jr.	Succeeded by Michael Howard
