= Ronald H. Spector =

American military historian (1943–2026)

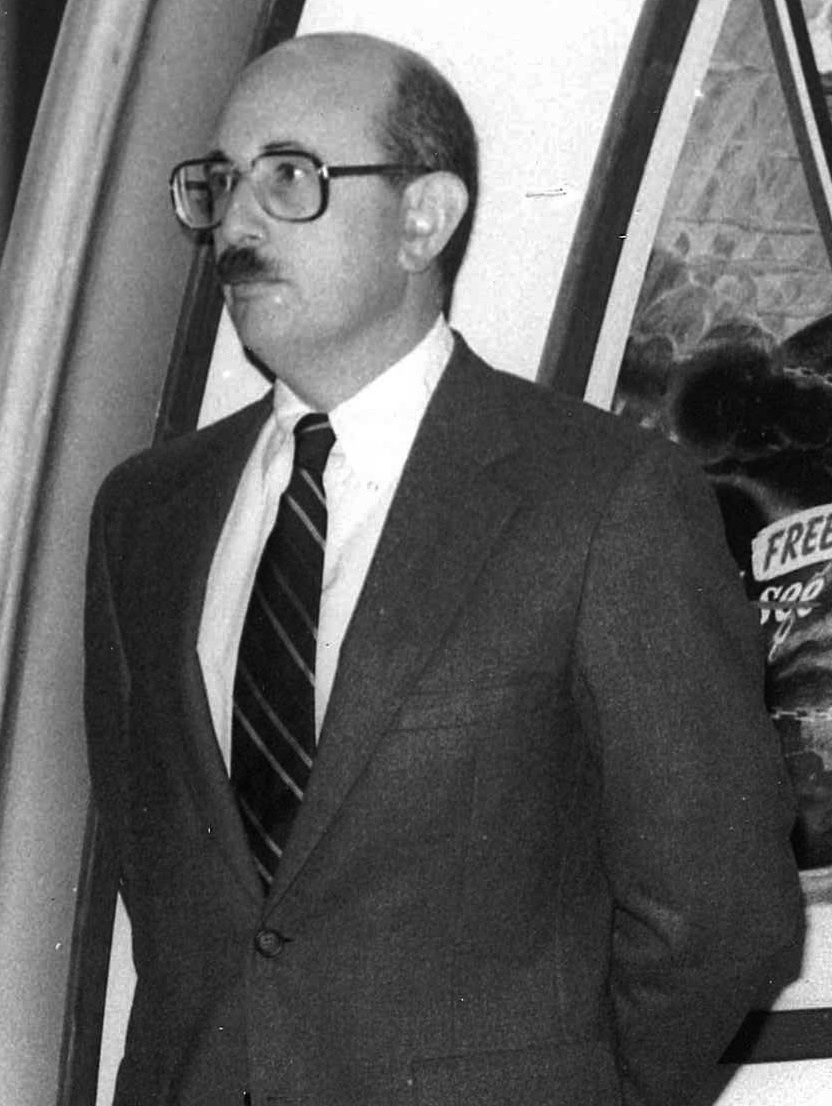
- Spector in the late 1980s
- Born: January 17, 1943; Pittsburgh, Pennsylvania, U.S.
- Died: March 26, 2026 (aged 83); Annandale, Virginia, U.S.
- Education: Johns Hopkins University (BA); Yale University (PhD)
- Occupations: Historian, writer, academic
- Writing career
- Subject: Military history

Ronald Harvey Spector (January 17, 1943 – March 26, 2026) was an American military historian. He was a professor at George Washington University.

== Early life and education ==
Spector was born in Pittsburgh on January 17, 1943. He graduated from Johns Hopkins University in 1964 with a bachelor's degree in history. In 1967 he gained a Ph.D. from Yale University in the same subject.

== Military career ==
Spector enlisted in the United States Marine Corps and served in the Vietnam War, reaching the rank of Lieutenant Colonel in the reserves. He was a historian at the United States Army Center of Military History. He was tasked to prepare a study of the Grenada operation.

== Academic career ==
Spector was a Senior Fulbright Scholar in India from 1977 to 1978. He taught at the National War College, the University of Alabama, and the United States Army War College. From 1990 until his retirement in 2020, he served on the faculty of George Washington University in Washington, D.C. He was also a contributing writer for the Encyclopædia Britannica.

He joined the State Department's Historical Advisory Committee on Historical Diplomatic Documentation in the late 1980s as a representative of the American Historical Association. At the 1989 meeting, Spector and other members discussed expediting the publication of the Foreign Relations of the United States (FRUS) series and improving the process of classifying and declassifying documents. He advocated reprinting and distributing the 20 backlogged volumes of FRUS to depository libraries, and suggested lobbying Congress for funding for this purpose. Spector also expressed his views on the need to maintain a complete historical record.

== Personal life ==
Spector married his wife Dianne Frank in 1970. They has two sons, and four grandchildren. Spector died at his home in Annandale, Virginia, on March 26, 2026, at the age of 83, from cancer.

== Accolades ==
In 2012, Spector was awarded the Samuel Eliot Morison Prize, for his breadth of contributions to the field of military history. His book Eagle Against the Sun: The American War with Japan was the 1986 winner of the Theodore and Franklin D. Roosevelt Prize in Naval History.

Organizations	Year	Category	Work	Result	Ref.
The New York Council of the Navy League of the United States	1986	Theodore and Franklin D. Roosevelt Prize in Naval History	Eagle Against the Sun: The American War with Japan	Won	
Society for Military History	2001	Distinguished Book Awards	At War, at Sea: Sailors and Naval Combat in the Twentieth Century	Won	
Society for Military History	2002	Distinguished Book Awards	The Oxford Companion to American Military History	Won	
Society for Military History	2012	Samuel Eliot Morison Prize	—	Honored	

== Bibliography ==
=== Books ===
- — (1974). Admiral of the New Empire: The Life and Career of George Dewey. Baton Rouge, Louisiana: Louisiana State University Press. ISBN 978-0-8071-0078-3. LCCN 73090870. OCLC 1158824.
- — (1977). Professors of War: The Naval War College and the Development of the Naval Profession. Historical Monographs. Newport, Rhode Island: Naval War College Press. ISBN 978-0-9637973-2-2. LCCN 77007155. OCLC 2965425. Archived from the original on 2025-04-26.
- — (1983). Advice and Support: The Early Years, 1941-1960. Washington, D.C.: Center of Military History. ISBN 978-0-16-001600-4. LCCN 83600103. OCLC 1011926436.
- — (1985). Eagle Against the Sun: The American War with Japan. New York: Free Press. ISBN 978-0-02-930360-3. LCCN 84047888. OCLC 10998802.
- — (1987). U.S. Marines in Grenada, 1983 (PDF). Washington, D.C.: United States Marine Corps History Division, United States Marine Corps. OCLC 16166872. Archived from the original (PDF) on 2024-12-09.
- — (1993). After Tet: The Bloodiest Year in Vietnam. New York: Free Press. ISBN 978-0-02-930380-1. LCCN 92023853. OCLC 26160000.
- Chambers, John Whiteclay; Spector, Ronald H.; Anderson, Fred; Eden, Lynn; Glatthaar, Joseph T.; Piehler, G. Kurt (1999). The Oxford Companion to American Military History. New York: Oxford University Press. doi:10.1093/acref/9780195071986.001.0001. ISBN 978-0-19-534092-1. LCCN 99021181. OCLC 213465912.
- — (2001). At War, at Sea: Sailors and Naval Combat in the Twentieth Century. New York City: Viking Press. ISBN 978-0-670-86085-2. LCCN 2001017551. OCLC 123102596.
- — (2008). In the Ruins of Empire: The Japanese Surrender and the Battle for Postwar Asia. New York City: Random House. ISBN 978-0-8129-6732-6. LCCN 2008275282. OCLC 233637025.
- — (2010). "The Military Effectiveness of the US Armed Forces, 1919–39". Military Effectiveness, Volume 2: The Interwar Period. By —. Millett, Allan R.; Murray, Williamson (eds.). Vol. 2. Cambridge: Cambridge University Press. doi:10.1017/CBO9780511762963.005. ISBN 978-0-521-42589-6. LCCN 2010549614. OCLC 1039865088.
- — (2022). A Continent Erupts: Decolonization, Civil War, and Massacre in Postwar Asia, 1945-1955. New York: W. W. Norton & Company. ISBN 978-0-393-25465-5. LCCN 2022027160. OCLC 1272857193.

=== Articles ===
- — (December 1986). "'What Did You Do In The War, Professor?'". American Heritage. Vol. 38, no. 1. ISSN 0002-8738. Archived from the original on April 26, 2025.
- — (January 29, 1987). "Books; U.S. and Arms". The New York Times. ISSN 0362-4331. Archived from the original on February 21, 2025.
- — (1991). "Military History and the Academic World" (PDF). Army History. No. 19. Washington, D.C.: United States Army Center of Military History. pp. 1–8. ISSN 1546-5330. JSTOR 26302864. Archived from the original (PDF) on April 26, 2025.
- — (February 2000). "The Right Man at the Right Time". Proceedings. Vol. 126, no. 2. ISSN 0041-798X. Archived from the original on April 26, 2025 – via United States Naval Institute.
- — (October 3, 2017). "What McMaster Gets Wrong About Vietnam". Politico Magazine. ISSN 2381-1595. Archived from the original on February 6, 2023.

=== Papers ===
- — (1972). "The American Image of Southeast Asia 1790–1865, A Preliminary Assessment". Journal of Southeast Asian Studies. 3 (2). Cambridge University Press: 299–305. doi:10.1017/S0022463400019342. ISSN 0022-4634. JSTOR 20069991. OCLC 8272696194. S2CID 162973880.
- — (1972). ""You're Not Going To Send Soldiers Over There Are You!": The American Search For an Alternative To the Western Front 1916-1917". Military Affairs. 36 (1). American Military Institute, Kansas State University. Department of History: 1–4. ISSN 0026-3931. JSTOR 1983836. OCLC 7586543641. S2CID 165723002. ProQuest 1296641316.
- — (1974). "Getting Down to the Nitty-Gritty: Military History, Official History and the American Experience in Vietnam". Military Affairs. 38 (1). American Military Institute, Kansas State University. Department of History: 11–12. ISSN 0026-3931. JSTOR 1987324. OCLC 7547274330. S2CID 165574273. ProQuest 1296641850.
- — (1981). "The Royal Indian Navy Strike of 1946: A Study of Cohesion and Disintegration in Colonial Armed Forces". Armed Forces & Society. 7 (2). Sage Publishing: 271–284. doi:10.1177/0095327X8100700208. ISSN 1556-0848. OCLC 9069051917.
- — (1982). "Allied Intelligence and Indochina, 1943-1945". Pacific Historical Review. 51 (1). University of California Press: 23–50. doi:10.2307/3639819. ISSN 1533-8584. JSTOR 3639819. OCLC 7021539481. S2CID 163529975.
- — (1988). ""In the Nam" and "Back in the World": American and Vietnamese Sources on the Vietnam War". The Journal of American History. 75 (1). Oxford University Press: 209–214. doi:10.2307/1889668. ISSN 1936-0967. JSTOR 1889668. S2CID 159845689.
- — (1990). "An Improbable Success Story: Official Military Histories in the Twentieth Century". The Public Historian. 12 (1). University of California Press: 25–30. doi:10.2307/3378320. ISSN 0272-3433. JSTOR 3378320. S2CID 153610638.
- — (1992). "Public History and Research in Military History: What Difference Has It Made?". The History Teacher. 26 (1). Society for History Education: 91–93. ISSN 0018-2745. JSTOR 494088. OCLC 425442362. S2CID 142065303.
- — (2005). "After Hiroshima: Allied Military Occupations and the Fate of Japan's Empire, 1945-1947". The Journal of Military History. 69 (4). Society for Military History: 1121–1136. ISSN 1543-7795. JSTOR 3397181. S2CID 155020690. Project MUSE 187682.
- — (2007). "Teetering on the Brink of Respectability". The Journal of American History. 93 (4). Oxford University Press: 1158–1160. doi:10.2307/25094603. ISSN 1936-0967. JSTOR 25094603. S2CID 155675050.
- — (2013). "Phat Diem: Nationalism, Religion, and Identity in the Franco-Viet Minh War". Journal of Cold War Studies. 15 (3). MIT Press: 34–46. doi:10.1162/JCWS_a_00369. ISSN 1531-3298. JSTOR 26924383. S2CID 57566763. Project MUSE 522708.
