= Michael Leggiere =

American academic

Michael V. Leggiere is an American academic who is the Professor of War, Strategy and Statecraft at the Hamilton School for Classical and Civic Education at The University of Florida. He previously held the role of professor at the University of North Texas as deputy-director for the Barsanti Center for Military History. Leggiere's emphasis is on the Napoleonic era, and he deals most specifically with Prussian operations in Germany and France during 1813-14. According to his university profile, Leggiere is "one of the leading historians in the world of the Napoleonic Wars." This is supported by the fact that Leggiere has received the International Napoleonic Society Literary Award two times, once in 2002 and again in 2007. Leggiere also serves on the program committee of the Society for Military History and is on the board of directors for the Consortium on Revolutionary Europe.

== Career ==
Leggiere is a 1997 graduate of Florida State University and has previously taught at Hawaii Pacific University, Louisiana State University, Shreveport and the Naval War College. While at Louisiana State University - Shreveport, Leggiere served as the chair of the Department of History and Social Sciences from 2005-2008. Leggiere is the author of Napoleon and Berlin: The Franco-Prussian War in North Germany, 1813 and The Fall of Napoleon. He is currently writing a book on the 1815 Waterloo campaign. He has written a biography of Blucher.

== Awards ==
In 2002, he received the Société Napoléonienne Internationale's 2002 Literary Award. In 2004, he won the Society for Military History's Moncado Award, and in 2005 received the Société Napoléonienne Internationale Legion of Merit Award for Outstanding Contributions to Napoleonic Studies. For 2007, the Société Napoléonienne awarded him the First Place Literary Award, for the year's best work on Napoleon.

== Selected works ==
- Napoleon and Berlin: The Franco-Prussian War in North Germany, 1813. Norman: University of Oklahoma Press, 2002. ISBN 0806133996
- The Fall of Napoleon: The Allied Invasion of France, 1813-1814. Cambridge: Cambridge University Press, 2007. ISBN 9780521875424
- Blücher: Scourge of Napoleon. Norman: University of Oklahoma Press, 2014. ISBN 9780806144092
- Napoleon and the Struggle for Germany: The Franco-Prussian War of 1813. Vol. I: The War of Liberation, Spring 1813. Cambridge: Cambridge University Press, 2015. ISBN 9781107080515
- Napoleon and the Struggle for Germany: The Franco-Prussian War of 1813. Vol. II: The Defeat of Napoleon. Cambridge: Cambridge University Press, 2015. ISBN 9781107080546
- Napoleon and the Operational Art of War: Essays in Honor of Donald D. Horward (editor). Brill Academic Publishing, 2016. ISBN 9789004270343
