= Staff ride =

Military exercises and examinations

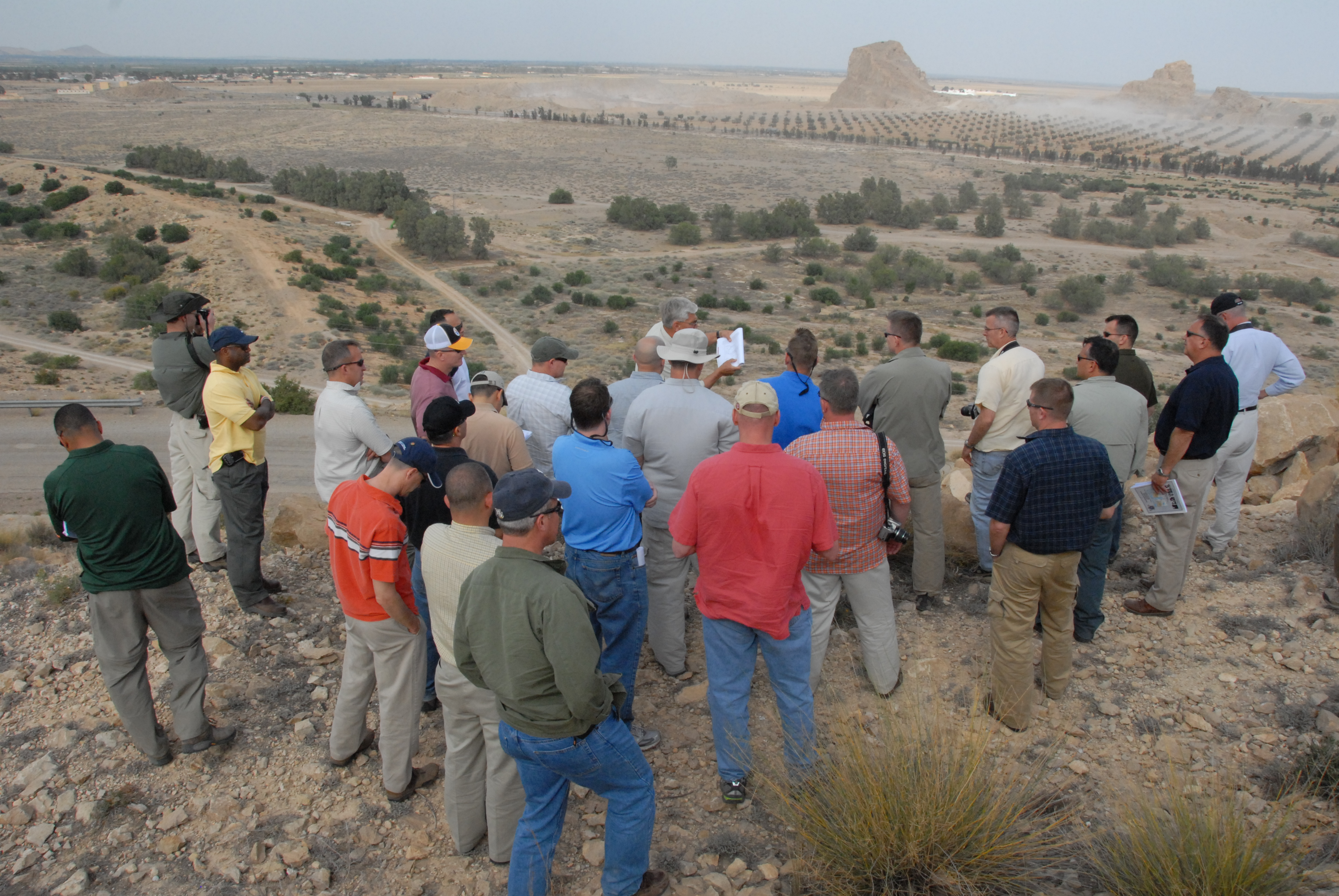
US Army soldiers during a staff ride in 2010 to a World War II battlefield in Tunisia

The term staff ride describes three different types of military exercises and examinations, usually conducted on a particular future battlefield or area of operation for the purpose of preliminary reconnaissance, terrain study and tactical preparation. As the Classic Staff Ride, the Leavenworth Staff Ride and the Decision-Forcing Staff Ride have been subjected to modern military scholarly work, the idea and practice of battlefield examination and exploitation has been documented throughout history. As early as 500 years BC, the Chinese general Sun Tzu emphasized the rigorous study of the terrain. Notable military commanders, such as Hannibal, Napoleon or Frederick the Great have regularly studied the terrain and exploited it to its full advantage.

== Types ==
=== Classic ===
The classic staff ride, a direct translation of the German term Stabs-Reise, is a technique made famous by Helmuth von Moltke the Elder in the second half of the nineteenth century. While serving as chief of the Great General Staff of the Prussian Army, Moltke took his subordinates on riding tours of areas where, in the event of war, significant military events, such as battles or the deployment of large numbers of troops were likely to occur. These exercises served the double purpose of training staff officers to appreciate the operational and strategic significance of particular pieces of terrain and informing contingency planning. The term "staff" refers to the fact that participants in these exercises were originally members of the Great General Staff.

The Prussian staff ride evolved to an intermediate stage between table-top war games and army maneuvers. In this expanded form of staff rides, the commanding officers and staffs deployed in the field as if at war, but without troops, with 'teams' for both sides. Reconnaissance and movement orders were given to umpires, who decided what and when units would be sighted or encountered, and passed the information back to the commanders and staffs. The exercise allowed the commanders to war game more realistically than on a table top. Critiques would take place at the conclusion of the staff rides. As an example, the Battle of Tannenberg was largely anticipated in one of Alfred von Schlieffen's pre-war staff rides.

=== Leavenworth ===
The Leavenworth staff ride was introduced by Major Eben Swift of the United States Army, while he was serving as assistant commandant of the General Service and Staff School, today's Command and General Staff College, at Fort Leavenworth, Kansas. Like the classic staff ride, the Leavenworth staff ride was originally conducted on horseback. Rather than studying the role that a particular piece of ground might play in a future conflict, the participants in a Leavenworth staff ride studied the ground associated with a battle or campaign that took place at some point in the past.

The staff rides conducted by Major Swift were those of the American Civil War. For example, in 1906, Major Swift led a group of twelve students on a staff ride to the site of the Battle of Chickamauga.

In the 1970s, the U.S. Army revived the staff ride, replacing horses with buses and automobiles. They expanded the range of battles and operations studied well beyond those of the Civil War, and extended the opportunity to participate to soldiers of all ranks and specialties.

In some instances, the Leavenworth staff ride consists of a guided tour of the battlefield, with explanations provided by military historians, park rangers, or others with expertise on the events in question. In other instances, each participant is assigned the task of explaining the events of a particular time and place to the other participants.

Since that time, army schools have used staff rides to enhance professional military education and training. It began at the United States Army Command and General Staff College (CGSC) and has continued at the War College and the officer schools. However, staff riding is not limited to officers. Non-commissioned officers find the process useful to understand higher level decision-making, military tactics, and leadership; they also benefit from a historical view of training.

A staff ride differs from a guided battlefield tour:

- It is an educational technique for studying leadership, decisions taken and whether alternatives could have been employed.
- It requires active participation, where each group member assumes the role of a participant in the battle, and he is questioned by the others as to the view on what occurred in the battlefield.

A properly conducted staff ride consists of three phases:

1. Preliminary Study: Participants study the battle or campaign in detail with guidance from the staff ride instructor. During this phase, each participant assumes a role or position to brief during the ride. This active learning enhances the educational value of the staff ride.
2. Field Study: A well-led staff ride with a competent instructor on the campaign or battle site is an invaluable lesson for all. The instructor should set the stage at each stand, orienting the students to key terrain, and then guide the students through the discussion of the actions at each position, finishing the stand with questions that help spark deeper analyses of the actions. Understanding the terrain, technology, force structure, and backgrounds of the key commanders is critical to understanding the battle. Properly prepared students will gain immeasurably from the experience of presenting information to their peers in this environment.
3. Integration: Integrating the insights and understandings developed during the staff ride and applying them to the current environment is crucial to the learning experience. At the end of the staff ride, the instructor should provide a final integration phase to examine the experience and firmly link the insights of the past to the army of today.

=== Decision-forcing ===
Also known as an "on-site decision-forcing case" or a "Quantico-style staff ride", a decision-forcing staff ride is a decision-forcing case conducted in the places where the decisions at the heart of the case were made. That place could be a historic building, a scenic overlook, or a ship that has been turned into a museum. In most instances, it is a portion of a battlefield that has been preserved.
