= Roy K. Flint =

United States Army general

Roy Kenneth Flint
- Born: October 22, 1928
- Died: February 17, 2016 (aged 87); Valle Crucis, North Carolina, US
- Education: University of Michigan
- Military career
- Branch: United States Army
- Service years: 1950–1990
- Rank: Brigadier general

Roy K. Flint (1928–2016) was a brigadier general in the United States Army, dean of the academic board at the United States Military Academy, and a president of the Society for Military History.

== Career ==
After graduating from the University of Michigan in June 1950, Flint enlisted in the army and enrolled in the Infantry Officer Candidate School. After graduating from the school, he served as a tactical officer there before being assigned to the 2nd Infantry Division as a company commander.

Over the next few years, Flint used his experience as an assistant professor of military science to complete a master's degree in history at the University of Alabama. He then went on to several assignments in the 82nd Airborne Division, the United States Army Command and General Staff College, and the British Staff College at Camberley. On January 31, 1968, Flint took command of a battalion of the 25th Infantry Division, which he commanded during the Tet Offensive and subsequent campaigns.

In June 1968, Flint became an instructor in the department of military art and engineering (now the department of history) at the United States Military Academy. He was later chosen to become a permanent associate professor in that department after completing his PhD in history at Duke University. Flint served as the head of the military history division from 1972 to 1981, and in 1981 became the professor and head of the history department. In July 1985, Flint was nominated dean of the academic board, making him the eighth officer to serve in the position and the first not to be a graduate of the academy. In 1986, Flint introduced a program that would make Zenith Z248 computers available for every incoming freshman cadet, part of a series of modernization efforts at the academy during his administration.

Flint was a member of the Society for Military History for much of his career, serving as a trustee from 1985 to 1993 and as vice president from 1991 through 1994, when he became president. In January 1995, he wrote William Rhenquist, chancellor and head of the board of regents of the Smithsonian Institution, urging him not to remove the Enola Gay from display in response to controversy surrounding the exhibit. Flint received the Victor Gondos Award for his distinguished service to the society in May 1995.

Flint retired from military service in June 1990, and moved with his wife to Valle Crucis, North Carolina. He taught history at Lees-McRae College and continued to write historical articles and give presentations on military history. Flint was also a member of Tau Kappa Epsilon fraternity.

In 2013, he appeared in the documentary Task Force Faith, based on the experiences of the 31st Regimental Combat Team in Korea.

== Death and legacy ==
Flint died at his home on February 17, 2016, and was buried in Saint John's Cemetery in Valle Crucis.
