= Martin Blumenson =

American military historian (1918–2005)

- Born: November 8, 1918; New York City, US
- Died: April 15, 2005 (aged 86); Washington, D.C., US
- Known for: Military historian
- Awards: Samuel Eliot Morison Prize

Academic background
- Education: Bucknell University; Harvard University

Martin Blumenson (November 8, 1918 – April 15, 2005) was an American military historian who served as a historical officer with the Third and Seventh Armies in World War II and later became a prolific author. His works included a biography of General George S. Patton.

== Biography ==
Born in New York City and raised in Bernardsville, New Jersey, in a family of Russian-Jewish descent, Blumenson graduated from Bernards High School in 1935 and was inducted into the school's wall of honor in 2015.

He studied at Bucknell University and Harvard University, earning master's degrees from both by 1942. During World War II, he became an officer in the United States Army and served as a historical officer with U.S. forces in the Central European Campaign from 1944 to 1945. Postwar, Blumenson remained in France for years, married a French woman and later divided his time between France and the United States.

During the Korean War, Blumenson again served with the U.S. Army and the unit he commanded (3rd Historical Detachment) was attached to IX Corps. After the Korean War, he worked in the Office of the Chief of Military History, contributing two works to the official U.S. Army history of World War II, Breakout and Pursuit and Salerno to Cassino. Working for the OCMH until 1967, Blumenson then worked for the Johnson administration as an adviser to the President's National Advisory Commission on Civil Disorders. Blumenson also taught or lectured at numerous institutions, prominent among which were the U.S. Military Academy, U.S. Naval Academy, and The Citadel.

During his career, Blumenson authored 17 works on the military history of World War II in North Africa and Europe. His works on Patton, The Patton Papers and Patton: The Man behind the Legend, 1885–1945 were acclaimed. Blumenson's final work was published in 2001. Blumenson died on April 15, 2005, in Washington, D.C.

In 1995, he was awarded the Samuel Eliot Morison Prize for lifetime achievement given by the Society for Military History.

Blumenson was a talented pianist, playing at Carnegie Hall.

In 2020 accusations were published that he manipulated an entry in the war-diary of General Patton (Patton-Papers 1974) concerning the Chenogne massacre (replacing paramedical soldiers with soldiers), which was addressed in a later correction, because Blumenson used instead of the original diary of Patton a typed copy with the manipulated content.

== Personal life ==
Blumenson met his wife Genevieve Aldebert (d. 2000) in France. They had one child, a son.

== Selected works ==
- The Vildé Affair: Beginnings of the French Resistance. 1958
- The European Theater of Operations: Breakout and Pursuit (PDF). Center of Military History. 1993 [1961]. LCCN 61-6000. Archived from the original (PDF) on September 27, 2012.
- The duel for France, 1944. Da Capo Press. 2000 [1963]. ISBN 9780306809385. OCLC 566324440.
- Anzio: The Gamble that Failed. Cooper Square Press. 2001 [1963]. ISBN 978-0815411291.
- Kasserine Pass. Houghton Mifflin. 1967. OCLC 397114.
- Sicily, Whose Victory? 1968.
- Salerno to Cassino. 1969.
- Bloody River: The Real Tragedy of the Rapido. Houghton Mifflin. 1970. OCLC 1020217216.
- The Patton Papers: 1940–1945. 1974.
- Masters of the Art of Command. Easton Press. 1992 [1975]. OCLC 28230097.
- Mark Clark, The Last of the Great World War II Commanders. 1984. Congdon & Weed, NY. Also Methuen Pubs, Canada ISBN 0-86553-123-4
- Patton: The Man Behind the Legend, 1885–1945. 1985.

== Education ==
- B.A. and M.A., Bucknell University, 1939, 1940.
- M.A., Harvard University, 1942.
