= The Journal of Military History =

- Discipline: Military history
- Language: English
- Edited by: Bruce Vandervort

Publication details
- Former name(s): Journal of the American Military Foundation; Journal of the American Military Institute; Military Affairs: The Journal of Military History, Including Theory and Technology
- History: 1937–present
- Publisher: Society for Military History (United States)
- Frequency: Quarterly

Standard abbreviations
- ISO 4: J. Mil. Hist.

Indexing
- ISSN: 0899-3718 (print); 1543-7795 (web)
- JSTOR: 08993718
- OCLC no.: 473101577

Links
- Journal homepage; Online access

The Journal of Military History is a quarterly peer-reviewed academic journal covering the military history of all times and places. It is the official journal of the Society for Military History. The journal was established in 1937 and the editor-in-chief is Bruce Vandervort (Virginia Military Institute). It is abstracted and indexed in the Arts & Humanities Citation Index and Current Contents/Arts & Humanities.

== History ==
The journal was established in 1937 as the Journal of the American Military Foundation. It was renamed Journal of the American Military Institute in 1939 and Military Affairs: The Journal of Military History, Including Theory and Technology in 1941, before obtaining its current name in 1989.
