= Brian McAllister Linn =

American military historian

Brian McAllister Linn is an American military historian, who specializes in the 20th century. He served on the faculty at Texas A&M University from 1989 to 2024. He was born in the territory of Hawaii and graduated from Ohio State University.

== Education ==
- Ph.D., Ohio State University, 1985
- M.A., Ohio State University, 1981
- B.A. with High Honors, University of Hawai’i, 1978

== Career ==
Linn has been the recipient of a John Simon Guggenheim Fellowship, a Woodrow Wilson Fellowship, and an Olin Fellowship. He taught as a visiting professor at the Army War College and a Fulbright Fellow at the National University of Singapore and the University of Birmingham. He is a past president of the Society for Military History.

== Books ==
- Linn, Brian McAllister. Real Soldiering: The US Army in the Aftermath of War, 1815-1980. Lawrence, University Press of Kansas, 2023.
- Linn, Brian McAllister. Elvis's Army: Cold War GIs and the Atomic Battlefield. Cambridge, Massachusetts: Harvard University Press, 2016. ISBN 9780674737686 OCLC 941582637
- Linn, Brian McAllister. The Echo of Battle: The Army's Way of War. Cambridge, MA: Harvard University Press, 2009.
- Linn, Brian McAllister. The Philippine War, 1899-1902. Lawrence: University Press of Kansas, 2000.
- Linn, Brian McAllister. Guardians of Empire: The U.S. Army and the Pacific; 1902-1940. Chapel Hill: Univ. of North Carolina Press, 1998. ISBN 080782321X
- Linn, Brian McAllister. The U.S. Army and Counterinsurgency in the Philippine War, 1899-1902. Chapel Hill: University of North Carolina Press, 1989. ISBN 0807818348

== Selected Articles, Essays, Book Chapters ==
- Linn, Brian McAllister. “The US Army and the Battle for Korea, 1950: Lessons Learned,” in Canada and the Korean War: Histories and Legacies of a Cold War Conflict, ed. Andrew Burtch and Tim Cook (Vancouver: University of British Columbia Press, 2024), 53-70
- Linn, Brian McAllister. “A Historical Perspective on Today’s Recruiting Crisis,” Parameters 53 (2023): 1-17, DOI 10.55540/0031-1723-3232
- Linn, Brian McAllister with Brian Donlon, “Learning or Confirming? History and the Military Professional,” War Room, 2023, https://warroom.armywarcollege.edu/articles/learning-lessons-2/
- Linn, Brian McAllister.“Evolving Grand Narratives: *A Forty-Year Perspective,” War and Society 46 (5 December 2022), https://doi.org/10.1080/07292473.2023.2150471
- Linn, Brian McAllister.“Forty Years On: Master Narratives and US Military History,” War and Society 46 (25 November 2022), https://doi.org/10.1080/07292473.2023.2150476
- Linn, Brian McAllister with Azarja Harmmany, “’The normal order of things’: Contextualizing ‘technical violence’ in the Netherlands-Indonesia War,” in Empire’s Violent End: Comparing British, Dutch, and French Wars of Decolonization, 1945-1962, ed. by Bart Luttikhuis and Thijs Brocades Zaalberg (Ithaca, NY: Cornell University Press, 2022), 120-40
- Linn, Brian McAllister. “Military Professionals and the Warrior Ethos in the Aftermath of War,” in The Harmon Memorial Lectures in Military History, 1988-2017, ed. Mark E. Groteleuschen (Maxwell AFB, AL: Air University Press, 2020), 591-606
- Linn, Brian McAllister. “The U.S. Army’s Postwar Recoveries,” Parameters 46 (2016): 13-22, https://press.armywarcollege.edu/parameters/vol46/iss3/4/
- Linn, Brian McAllister. “The U.S. Armed Forces’ View of War,” Daedalus (Summer 2011): 33-44. Revised for The Modern American Military, ed. David M. Kennedy (New York: Oxford University Press, 2013): 41-57
