= I. B. Holley Jr. =

United States Air Force general

Irving Brinton Holley Jr. (8 February 1919 – 12 August 2013) was an American historian. He was a leading scholar in the field of American social and intellectual history, and his particular emphasis was on military history and the history of technology.

== Biography ==
A native of Torrington, Connecticut, and graduate of Wilbraham Academy, Holley attended Amherst College and graduated in 1940 (cum laude, Phi Beta Kappa). He then pursued graduate work at Yale University, and for his academic success in his first year received the Tew Prize as Outstanding Scholar in History. Following the attack on Pearl Harbor in December 1941, Holley enlisted in the United States Army and became an aerial gunner, although he still received his A.M. from Yale in 1942. His doctoral work was interrupted by his military service, and he did not receive the Ph.D. from Yale until 1947. Promoted to staff sergeant, he was an instructor at Harlingen Army Air Base in Texas. Subsequently, he attended Officer Candidate School at Miami Beach, Florida, commissioning in April 1944, and then headed a gunnery school at Charleston Army Air Base. Following that, he was assigned for technical intelligence work at the Headquarters, Air Materiel Command, at Wright Field, Dayton, Ohio. Promoted to the rank of captain by the conclusion of the war, Holley returned to the civilian world in 1946 but remained in the reserves. From 1945 to 1947, Holley was a faculty member at the Industrial College of the Armed Forces before taking a position at Duke University for the remainder of his career. He would ultimately rise to the rank of major general, retiring in 1981.

Holley deposited genealogical material on the Holley family (1777–2008) with the Connecticut Historical Society.

== Scholarly impact ==
Holley's scholarly work began while he was in uniform during World War II. In 1944 and 1945, he was based at Wright Field, in Dayton, Ohio. There he wrote three works analyzing research and development programs for aircraft in the Army over the preceding decades. These were "Evolution of the Liaison-Type Airplane, 1917–1944", "Development of Aircraft Gun Turrets in the Army Air Forces", and "Rotary-Wing Aircraft in the Army of Air Forces, a Study in Research and Development Policies". Holley later identified a theme that ran through these three monographs: "the pace of development for any weapon during the between-war years is chiefly determined by the extent to which its mission or operational function is known and defined." Holley saw the pace of development as slow when there was "no effective system for determining doctrine." His subsequent work Ideas and Weapons was an outgrowth of that initial work during World War II, and was part of what Holley identified as a larger project to "distill from past experience in the development of air material those lessons which might be of help in formulating policies for exploiting the air weapons more successfully in the future" and possibly certain principles regarding weapons development. Ideas and Weapons attempted to examine both the use of aerial weapons by the United States in World War I and the problem of weapons development more generally. Drawing on an extensive body of primary material (including records from the U.S. National Archives, the Air Force's Central Files, the Army Air Force Historical Office, and collections at different service colleges), Holley established a significant, archivally-based analysis where no effective work on the period had existed before.

That larger research project yielded Holley's second major work, Buying Aircraft: Matériel Procurement for the Army Air Forces, published in 1964 as Special Studies volume in the official history of the United States Army in World War II series. In that volume, Holley explored procurement in a broad sense: "the computation of requirements, the evolution of internal organization, the relationship and accommodation of conflicts between executive and legislative agencies, the character and capabilities of the aircraft industry, and many other similar facets..." necessary together for a proper understanding the more basic elements of procurement, involving contracts, plant construction, and so on.

== Awards and prizes ==
- Duke Alumni Distinguished Teaching Award
- Samuel Eliot Morison Prize for lifetime achievement given by Society for Military History (1991)
- Outstanding Civilian Service Medal, United States Army
- Exceptional Service Medal, United States Air Force
- Distinguished Service Medal, United States Air Force
- Air Force Legion of Merit

== Bibliography ==
- Ideas and Weapons (Yale University Press, 1953)
- General John M. Palmer, Citizen Soldiers, and the Army of a Democracy (Praeger, 1982)
- Buying Aircraft: Matériel Procurement for the Army Air Forces (Washington, D.C.: Army Center for Military History, 1964, 1989)
- The Highway Revolution, 1895–1925: How the United States Got Out of the Mud (Carolina Academic Press, 2008)
