= John Shy =

American military historian (1931–2022)

- Born: March 23, 1931; Ohio, U.S.
- Died: April 8, 2022 (aged 91); Ann Arbor, Michigan, U.S.
- Occupation: Historian
- Known for: Military history
- Notable work: Toward Lexington (1965)

John Willard Shy (March 23, 1931 – April 8, 2022) was a military historian and professor emeritus at the University of Michigan. Shy was part of a group of military historians who examined the interplay of the military, politics, and society in the colonial and revolutionary periods of American history.

== Education ==
Born in Ohio, Shy attended the United States Military Academy, graduating with a B.S. degree in the class of 1952. He received his M.A. degree in history from the University of Vermont in 1957. Shy graduated with his Ph.D. degree in history from Princeton University in 1961. His doctoral thesis was entitled The British army in North America, 1760-1775.

== Career ==
Shy was commissioned as a United States Army officer in 1952 and served on active duty until 1955. He transitioned to the Army Reserve and ultimately attained the rank of captain.

Shy became an associate professor at Princeton in 1959, an associate professor at Michigan in 1968 and a full professor there in 1971. He was a visiting professor at the United States Army War College from 1974 to 1975.

Shy specialized in the American Colonial and Revolutionary periods.

The University of Michigan presented him with the Distinguished Faculty Achievement Award in 1994.

Shy received the Morison Prize from the Society for Military History in 2002.

Shy gave the 2008 George C. Marshall Lecture in Military History.

Shy lived in Ann Arbor, Michigan after his retirement and died in 2022.

== Selected works ==
- Paret, Peter, and John W. Shy. Guerrillas in the 1960s. New York: Published for the Center of International Studies, Princeton University, by Praeger, 1962. OCLC 275746
- Shy, John W. Toward Lexington; The Role of the British Army in the Coming of the American Revolution. Princeton, N.J.: Princeton University Press, 1965.
- Shy, John W. A People Numerous and Armed: Reflections on the Military Struggle for American Independence. New York: Oxford University Press, 1976. ISBN 0195020138
- Gilbert, Benjamin, and John W. Shy. Winding Down: The Revolutionary War Letters of Lieutenant Benjamin Gilbert of Massachusetts, 1780–1783: From His Original Manuscript Letterbook in the William L. Clements Library, Ann Arbor, Michigan. [Ann Arbor]: University of Michigan Press, 1989. ISBN 0472101129
