= Carol Reardon =

American military historian

- Awards: Helen Dortch Longstreet Prize, Victor Gondos Memorial Service Award, William Woods Hassler Award for Excellence in Civil War Education

Academic background
- Education: Allegheny College, University of South Carolina, University of Kentucky

Academic work
- Main interests: American military history

Carol Reardon is an American military historian with a concentration in Civil War and Vietnam eras. She was a George Winfree Professor of American History at Pennsylvania State University. She now currently teaches at Gettysburg College.

== Academic life ==
Reardon received a Bachelor of Science from Allegheny College in 1974, a master's at University of South Carolina in 1980, and a doctorate at University of Kentucky in 1987. In addition to teaching at Penn State, Reardon is a visiting professor at United States Military Academy at West Point and has taught at the U.S. Army War College. Reardon has been a faculty member at Marine Corps Command and Staff College, U.S. Army War College, U.S. Army Military History Institute, and University of Georgia. Additionally, Reardon was the Associate Editor on The Papers of Henry Clay Documentary Editing Project. Reardon is a scholar-in-residence at the George and Ann Richards Civil War Era Center at Penn State University, and an associate professor.

== Publications ==
- Soldiers and Scholars: The U.S. Army and The Uses of Military History, 1865-1920 examines the purpose and abuse of military history. It was thought that the professionalization of the army would allow U.S. military officials to be aware of many different strategies that would lead to a positive or negative outcome. However, many argued that military history only prepared soldiers for previous wars, and not current ones.
- Launch the Intruders: A Naval Attack Squadron in the Vietnam War, 1972 explores the acclaimed Linebacker campaign, a series of forays from the USS Saratoga undertaken by Attack Squadron 75 (known as "Sunday Punchers"). This text profiles the pilots and mechanics of Squadron 75, looking at their lives of the lives of their families to provide an interesting look at the Vietnam War.
- "William T. Sherman in Postwar Georgia's Collective Memory, 1886-1914" is a chapter in the book Wars within a War, edited by Joan Waugh and Gary W. Gallagher. Reardon's chapter examines the memory of William Sherman after the Civil War and how public opinion of him gradually declined after the worst phase of Reconstruction had passed.
- "From 'King of Spades' to 'First Captain of the Confederacy': R.E. Lee's First Six Weeks with the Army of Northern Virginia" is a chapter within the text Lee the Soldier, edited by Gary W. Gallagher. Reardon's section explores the change in the remembered perception of Robert E. Lee created during the Seven Days campaign. When Lee was chosen to army command he was not considered to be an important military leader. The Seven Days Battles did create many major supporters of Lee; however, there were many vocal critics as well. Many newspapers and Lee's military subordinates judged Lee's military achievements harshly. It was not until Lee's death in 1870, that his remembered image became heroic. It was not until the 1930s when Douglas Southall Freeman published the book "R.E.Lee" that provided an intellectual critique of Lee. Additionally, there have only been three major texts examining the Seven Days Battles.
- "Civil War Military Campaigns: The Union" is a chapter in the book A Companion to the Civil War and Reconstruction edited by Lacy K. Ford. Reardon's chapter analyzes the shifting views of why the North won the Civil War. Immediately, after the Civil War few explored the reasons that the North had won one reason is that many did not find the reasons relevant. The first inquiries as to why the North won came from military leaders in the late 19th century and the early 20th century and those authors believed that President Abraham Lincoln was a greater reason for winning the war than General Ulysses S. Grant. In the 1950s, Authors Bruce Catton, Allan Nevins, and T. Harry Williams demonstrated that there were greater reasons for winning the war than just the fact that the North had more resources than the South possessed. The Civil War centennial promoted more academic discussion of the Northern victory. Most agreed that the South could win. Furthermore, many argued that the North had a better management system with soldiers and civilians. Finally, between 1900 and 2000 there was a rise in the study of Civil War battle studies and authors found that the North adopted quicker to the rifle and had access to better military technology than the South, which was a large reason for the Northern victory.
- "Pickett's Charge: the Convergence of History and Myth in the Southern Past" is a chapter in The Third Day at Gettysburg and Beyond edited by Gary W. Gallagher. Reardon's section examines the changing views of Maj. Gen. George E. Pickett and Pickett's Charge on the third day at Gettysburg. Following the battle, the Confederate soldiers blamed each other for their defeat, rather than the Union soldiers. The press reported on rumors and accusations which immediately led to an incorrect history laced with gossip. Pickett's men observed how Lee's death help create a heroic image of him and decided to employ the same methods with Pickett. They used romanticism and Southern-style literature and became seen by the public as heroes. However, a man named William R. Bond was not satisfied with the Virginian version and wrote many articles on why North Carolina troops were the true heroes. This led to Pickett's widow entering the literary war over the third day at Gettysburg. She referred to Pickett as "My Soldier," and told heartwarming stories about him.

== Interviews ==
=== An interview with Carol Reardon: On Civil War history, literature, and popular memory ===
Reardon state that she still believes that historians are interested in literary and nontraditional sources because these sources allow the reader to understand many different aspects of society. For instance, women and children's studies can be researched through non-traditional sources, such as schoolbooks, songs, poetry, etc. Nontraditional sources can fill in the blanks between the home-front and the battlefield. She thinks they are both wartime literature and post-wartime literature are important. Wartime literature allows historians to determine what the understanding of the war was. Post-wartime literature is important because it allows historians to see how understanding has changed. What was remembered, what was lost, and what was changed that may have no foundation in reality. The question that comes from comparing those sources is why they changed. Additionally, literature allows historians to know the underlining emotions that the author felt and sales enable historians to see if the public felt the same way. The literature demonstrates the political and social strains during that time period. Reardon believes that sources that combined nonfiction and fiction are good tools to develop strong historical methodologies. Historians need to research to determine if the author could have known the information at the time or it became knowledge after the fact. Reardon explains the difference between Civil War novel and the Civil War memoirs. With the novel, the author enters the project with no desire to keep within nonfiction; however, with memoirs, authors begin with the intention to stay true, yet once history becomes either dark or boring they add fictional elements. Reardon uses the Battle of Gettysburg to demonstrate how popular memory of the Civil War changes. Now, the Battle of Gettysburg is seen as a unifying symbol and the end of the Civil War; however, that was not always how it was seen. After the Civil War, Gettysburg was primarily targeted to inspire pride in the Union Army and the North. Many Southerners did not make the journey to Gettysburg because there was not much incentive to attend. It was not until the late 1880s that the Battle of Gettysburg began to be expressed in the dramatic unifying moment in United States' history. Finally, Reardon examines the novel The Killer Angels by Michael Shaara. Reardon argues that the novel is useful creates a different perspective of actors in the Civil War which allows people to being to study historiography. Additionally, a fictional novel can promote the public to begin to read non-fiction work on the Battle of Gettysburg. However, Reardon cautions that readers believe that the characters are real and if they are not, it can turn them off from reading.

== Television appearances ==
=== C-Span: open phones with Carol Reardon ===
This appearance was to discuss the history of the Battle of Gettysburg on the 150th anniversary. She was asked how the celebrations have changed over the years. Reardon explains that the greatest amount of monument buildings that are on the Gettysburg field happened in the 1880s to 1900s. The monuments were often built by the Civil War Veterans who wanted to have a large say in the design of the monument. The 73rd New York monument is a soldier and a fireman because many of the soldiers were firemen and they wanted to show how the fireman could become the soldier. The 42nd New York monument is a Native American teepee, it represents Tammany Hall which was the Democratic Political Machine in New York. Between regiments, there were arguments over the land to place their monuments. Both the 2nd and 11th Corps wanted Cemetery Hill. The original ruling by the Gettysburg Park authorities was that it should be the 11th Corps because they were the ones who were mainline was actually on Cemetery Hill. However, the 2nd was necessary on the line at Cemetery Hill when the Confederate Soldiers broke through briefly on the night of the 2nd. Additionally, the 2nd did not have a main section anywhere else to build their monument. On another note, Confederate soldiers were not allowed to be buried at the National Cemetery and were buried wherever they left. And it was until the 1870s, that Southern women decided to raise the money to bring the bones back home. Reardon discusses paroled soldiers. Initially, when a soldier was paroled they had to promise to go home until they were notified that they had been exchanged. However, many soldiers continued to stay home after they received their notification, so they created parole camps. These camps held the paroled soldiers and leaders from both Union and Confederate parole camps would meet and agree on an exchange. If a soldier was officially exchanged then they would be told to go back to their regiment.

=== C-Span: Pickett's Charge panel ===
This television appearance was a discussion panel including the following historians: Troy Hartman, Jeffry Wert, Richard Sommers, and Peter Carmichael. One topic that Reardon discussed is that Lee concluded to attack reasonably. He evaluates all his options compared them to his ultimate objective. Reardon explains that the first thing that Lee witnessed of day one of Gettysburg is the final attack of the day. It was an attack on open ground and it was a smaller scale of what was later be used at Pickett's Charge. Additionally, on the second day a small amount the Confederate forces were able to get close to the Union line. Ultimately, Reardon argued that Lee asked himself the question 'What can I do?' and then devised a logical plan for the third day. One issue Reardon explains is that it is not concretely known what was Lee's intention at Gettysburg because there are not a lot of primary sources. For example, there were no notes taken at the meeting between Jefferson Davis and Lee; thus, it is not known was discussed there. At the time of the Civil War, it was not required that there be a commander's intent. Reardon does discuss that the purpose of artillery bombardment was to destroy the Union's artillery to hit an area target of both Clump of Trees and Ziegler's Grove. Reardon also discussed how historians believe that Lee was aiming for the seam between two different Union groups. At the end of the talk, Reardon explains how the Union army did a great job at Gettysburg.

== Awards ==
Reardon has been awarded the Helen Dortch Longstreet Prize from the Longstreet Society (2009), Victor Gondos Memorial Service Award from the Society for Military History (2009), George W. Atherton Award for Excellence in Teaching from the Penn State University (2007), and William Woods Hassler Award for Excellence in Civil War Education from the Civil War Education Association (2004).
