= Edward M. Coffman =

American military historian (1929–2020)

Edward M. Coffman (January 27, 1929 – September 16, 2020) was a military historian and University of Wisconsin-Madison professor emeritus.

== Early life ==
He was born in Hopkinsville, Kentucky, and earned his BA, MA, and PhD at the University of Kentucky. While an undergraduate member of the Reserve Officer Training Corps (ROTC), he was a member of the National Society of Pershing Rifles as well as Scabbard and Blade.

== Military career ==
He served as an infantry officer in the U.S. Army from 1951 to 1953, serving in Japan and Korea.

== Academic career ==
He taught at Memphis State University for two years and the University of Wisconsin–Madison (1961–92). He was Forrest Pogue's research assistant on the first volume of his biography of George C. Marshall. Coffman spent a year each as a visiting professor at Kansas State University, U.S. Military Academy, U.S. Air Force Academy, Army War College, and the Army Command and General Staff College.

Coffman served on the History Book Club advisory committee beginning in 1987. A member of the Society for Military History since 1956, he held several offices including president. He served on the National Historical Publications and Records Commission (1972–76) and the Department of the Army History Committee for six years and as chair for an additional four years.

Coffman received a Southern Faculty Fellowship and a Guggenheim Fellowship. He was a member of the UK Phi Beta Kappa chapter and was an Honorary Graduate of the Army Command and General Staff College. Over the years the Army awarded him the Commander's Award for Public Service, Outstanding Civilian Service Award, and Distinguished Civilian Service Award. He was named a University of Kentucky Distinguished Graduate and the Wisconsin State Assembly gave him a citation for his contributions as a teacher and historian. In 1991, the Society for Military History gave him the Samuel Eliot Morison Award for his contribution to military history, and its Distinguished Book Award for The Regulars. ABC-CLIO gave him the Spencer Tucker Award for Outstanding Achievement in the Field of Military History.

Coffman's research interests were the American participation in World War I and the social history of the U. S. Regular Army, including not only officers and soldiers but the wives and children who lived on the posts. He has published numerous articles since 1956. In addition to research in secondary scholarly works, he depended on unpublished and published memoirs and records as well as oral history and correspondence, particularly in his books on World War I and his most recent book about the Regular Army.

== Legacy ==
His research files have been donated to the George C. Marshall Foundation. He has been inducted into the University of Wisconsin-Madison Army ROTC Hall of Fame.

== Bibliography ==
- Edward M. Coffman (1966). The Hilt of the Sword: the Career of Peyton C. March. Madison: University of Wisconsin Press. ISBN 0-299-03910-2.
- Edward M. Coffman (1998). The War To End All Wars: the American military experience in World War I. Oxford University Press, NY (re-printed by the University of Wisconsin Press in 1986, and the University Press of Kentucky in 1998). ISBN 978-0-8131-0955-8. (see Army Quarterly, October 1969, p. 126-7 for review)
- Edward M. Coffman (1986). The Old Army: A Portrait of the American Army in Peacetime, 1784-1898. New York: Oxford University Press. ISBN 0-19-503750-2.
- Edward M. Coffman (2004). The Regulars: the American Army, 1898-1941. Cambridge, MA: Harvard University Press. ISBN 978-0-674-01299-8.
- Edward M. Coffman (2014). The Embattled Past: Reflections on Military History. Lexington, KY: University Press of Kentucky. ISBN 978-0813142661.
