= Society for Military History =

US-based international organization of scholars

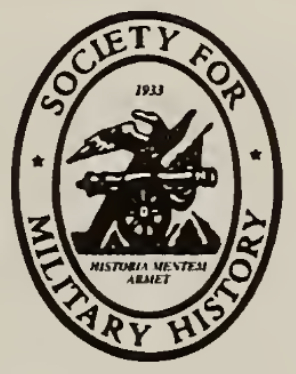
- Emblem of the Society for Military History
- Formation: 1933; 93 years ago
- Headquarters: George C. Marshall Library, Lexington, Virginia, US
- Website: militarysociety.org

The Society for Military History is a United States–based international organization of scholars who research, write, and teach military history of all time periods and places. It includes naval history, air power history, and studies of technology, ideas, and homefronts. It publishes the quarterly refereed The Journal of Military History.

== Activities ==
The society was established in 1933 as the American Military History Foundation, renamed in 1939 to the American Military Institute, and renamed again in 1990 to the Society for Military History. It has over 2,300 members, including many prominent scholars, soldiers, and citizens interested in military history. Membership is open to anyone and includes a subscription to the journal.

The Society also sponsors sessions on military topics at the annual Northern Great Plains History Conference.

=== Annual meetings ===
The Society typically holds a meeting in the first half of every year.

Recent meetings have been held in the following locations:

| Year | Date | Location | Theme |
|---|---|---|---|
| 2023 | March 23- | San Diego, California | |
| 2022 | April 28-May 1 | Fort Worth, TX | |
| 2021 | May 20-23 | Norfolk, VA | “Turning the Tide: Revolutionary Moments in Military History” |
| 2020 | April 30–May 3 Meeting cancelled due to coronavirus pandemic | Army Historical Foundation, Arlington, VA | “Policy by Other Means” |
| 2019 | April 30–May 3 | Columbus, OH | "Soldiers and Civilians in the Cauldron of War" |
| 2018 | April 5–8 | Louisville, KY | "Landscapes of War and Peace" |
| 2017 | March 30–April 2 | Jacksonville, FL | "Global War: Historical Perspectives" |
| 2016 | April 14–17 | Ottawa, Ontario, Canada | "Crossing Borders, Crossing Boundaries" |
| 2015 | April 9–12 | Montgomery, Alabama | "Conflict and Commemoration: The Influence of War on Society" |
| 2014 | April 3–6 | Kansas City, MO | "Transformational Conflicts: War and its Legacy Through History" |
| 2013 | March 14–17 | New Orleans, LA | "War, Society and Remembrance" |
| 2012 | May 10–13 | Army Historical Foundation, Arlington, VA | "The Politics of War" |
| 2011 | June 9–12 | Lisle, IL | "Ways of War" |
| 2010 | May 20–23 | Lexington, Virginia | "Causes Lost and Won" |
| 2009 | April 2–5 | Murfreesboro, Tennessee | "Warfare and Culture" |
| 2008 | April 17–19 | Ogden, Utah | "The Military and Frontiers" |
| 2007 | April 19–22 | Frederick, Maryland | "Crossroads of War" |

== Current and past presidents ==
- Gregory J. W. Urwin (President as of 2004)
- Dennis Showalter
- Carol Reardon
- Theodore Ropp
- Brian McAllister Linn
- Jeffrey Grey
- Roy K. Flint

== Prizes ==
=== Samuel Eliot Morison Prize ===
The Samuel Eliot Morison Prize recognizes not any one specific achievement, but a body of contributions in the field of military history, stretching over time and showing a range of scholarly work contributing significantly to the field. Recent winners include:

- Andy Wiest, University of Southern Mississippi, 2026
- Jennifer D. Keene, Chapman University, 2025
- John H. Morrow Jr., University of Georgia, 2024
- Brian McAllister Linn, Texas A&M University, 2023
- Beth Bailey, University of Kansas, 2022
- Robert M. Citino, National WWII Museum, 2021
- Jon Tetsuro Sumida, University of Maryland, 2020.
- Brian Holden-Reid, King's College London, 2019
- Hew Strachan, University of St Andrews, 2018
- John A. Lynn II, University of Illinois at Urbana-Champaign, 2017
- Conrad C. Crane, Army Heritage and Education Center, United States Army War College, 2016
- Joseph T. Glatthaar, University of North Carolina, Chapel Hill, 2015
- Rick Atkinson, Washington, DC, 2014
- Ira D. Gruber, Rice University, 2013
- Ronald H. Spector, The George Washington University, 2012
- Gerhard Weinberg, University of North Carolina, 2011
- Peter Maslowski, 2010
- Richard Kohn, 2009
- Jeremy Black, 2008
- James M. McPherson, 2007
- Robert A. Doughty, 2006
- Dennis Showalter, 2005
- Allan R. Millett, 2004
- Edward J. Drea, 2003
- John Shy, 2002
- Richard Overy, 2001
- David M. Glantz, 2000
- Geoffrey N. Parker, 1999
- Stephen E. Ambrose, 1998
- Robert M. Utley, 1997
- John Keegan, 1996
- Martin Blumenson, 1995
- Harold C. Deutsch, 1994
- Peter Paret, 1993
- Michael Howard, 1992
- I. B. Holley, Jr., and Theodore Ropp, 1991
- Edward M. Coffman, 1990
- Russell F. Weigley, 1989
- No Award, 1988
- Forrest C. Pogue, 1987
- Alvin D. Coox, 1986
- Robin Higham, 1985

=== Distinguished Book Awards ===
The Society's Distinguished Book Awards recognize the best books written in English on military history, broadly conceived.

==== 2026 ====
- John M. Kinder, World War Zoos: Humans and Other Animals in the Deadliest Conflict in the Modern Age, University of Chicago Press
- Andrew Preston, Total Defense: The New Deal and the Invention of National Security, Harvard University Press
- Lauren Duval, The Home Front: Revolutionary Households, Military Occupation, and the Making of American Independence, Omohundro Institute and University of North Carolina Press
- Hanna Diamond, Josephine Baker’s Secret War, Yale University Press, 2025
- Ian Ona Johnson and Robert Clemm, editors, A Violent Peace: A Global Military History of the Interwar Period, University Press of Kansas.

==== 2025 ====
- Pedro Luengo and Gene A. Smith, editors, A Fortified Sea: The Defense of the Caribbean in the Eighteenth Century. University of Alabama Press
- Kenneth M. Swope, Struggle for Empire: The Battles of General Zuo Zongtang, Naval Institute Press
- J. Matthew Ward, Garden of Ruins: Occupied Louisiana in the Civil War, Louisiana State University Press
- Wayne E. Lee, The Cutting-off Way: Indigenous Warfare in Eastern North America, 1500-1800, University of North Carolina Press
- Douglas Porch, Resistance and Liberation: France at War, 1942-1945, Cambridge University Press.

==== 2024 ====
- Beth Bailey, An Army Afire: How the US Army Confronted Its Racial Crisis in the Vietnam Era, University of North Carolina Press
- Rory Cox, Origins of the Just War: Military Ethics and Culture in the Ancient Near East, Princeton University Press
- Rebecca Schwartz Greene, Breaking Point: The Ironic Evolution of Psychiatry in World War II, 1931–1945, Fordham University Press
- Lyle Jeremy Rubin, Pain is Weakness Leaving the Body: A Marine’s Unbecoming, Bold Type Books
- Rachel Chrastil, Bismarck's War: The Franco-Prussian War and the Making of Modern Europe, Basic Books.

==== 2023 ====
- Carter Malkasian, The American War in Afghanistan: A History, Oxford University Press
- Douglas Porch, Defeat and Division: France at War, 1939-1942, Cambridge University Press
- Luke Reynolds, Who Owned Waterloo?: Battle, Memory, & Myth in British History, 1815-1852, Oxford University Press
- Richard Overy, Blood and Ruins: The Great Imperial War, 1931–1945, Viking
- Alexander Mikaberidze, Kutuzov: A Life in War and Peace, Oxford University Press
- Jonathan Abel, translated and annotated, Guibert’s General Essay on Tactics, Brill.

==== 2022 ====
- Thomas A. Guglielmo, Divisions: A New History of Racism and Resistance in America's World War II Military, Oxford University Press
- Wendy Goldman and Donald Filtzer, Fortress Dark and Stern: The Soviet Home Front during World War II, Oxford University Press
- Ian Ona Johnson, Faustian Bargain: The Soviet–German Partnership and the Origins of the Second World War, Oxford University Press
- Michael S. Nieberg, When France Fell: The Vichy Crisis and the Fate of the Anglo-American Alliance, Harvard University Press
- Ruth Scurr, Napoleon, A Life Told in Gardens and Shadows, Penguin Random House
- Karen Hagemann, Stefan Dudink and Sonya O. Rose, editors, Oxford Handbook of Gender, War and the Western World Since 1600, Oxford University Press.

==== 2021 ====
- Donald F. Johnson, Occupied America: British Military Rule and the Experience of Revolution,University of Pennsylvania Press, 2021.
- Alexander Mikaberidze, The Napoleonic Wars: A Global History, Oxford University Press, 2020.
- Daniel Whittingham, Charles E. Callwell and the British Way in Warfare, Cambridge University Press, 2019.
- Aaron Sheehan-Dean, ed., The Cambridge History of the American Civil War, Cambridge University Press, 2019.
- Meighen McCrae, Coalition Strategy and the End of the First World War, Cambridge University Press, 2019.
- Alexander Watson, The Fortress: The Siege of Przemysl and the Making of Europe’s Bloodlands, Basic Books, 2020

==== 2020 ====
- Monica Kim, NYU, The Interrogation Rooms of the Korean War: The Untold History, Princeton University Press, 2019.
- Geoffrey Robinson, UCLA, The Killing Season: A History of the Indonesian Massacres, 1965–66, Princeton University Press, 2018.
- Stephen Brumwell, Turncoat: Benedict Arnold and the Crisis of American Liberty, Yale University Press, 2018.
- Kelly DeVries, Loyola University, and Michael Livingston, The Citadel, eds., Medieval Warfare: A Reader, University of Toronto Press, 2019.
- Thomas Dodman, Columbia University, What Nostalgia Was: War, Empire, and the Time of a Deadly Emotion, University of Chicago Press, 2019.

==== 2019 ====
- A. Wilson Greene, A Campaign of Giants: The Battle for Petersburg Volume 1: From the Crossing of the James to the Crater (Civil War America), University of North Carolina Press, 2018
- Peter Guardino, The Dead March: A History of the Mexican-American War, Harvard University Press, 2018.
- Gonzalo M. Quintero Saravia, Bernardo de Gálvez: Spanish Hero of the American Revolution, University of North Carolina Press, 2018.
- Richard P. Tucker, Tait Keller, J. R. McNeill, and Martin Schmid, editors, Environmental Histories of the First World War, Cambridge University Press, 2018.

==== 2018 ====
- Christopher Phillips, The Rivers Ran Backward: The Civil War and the Remaking of the American Middle Border
- Ilya Berkovich, Motivation in War: The Experience of Common Soldiers in Old-Regime Europe
- Steven L. Ossad, Omar Nelson Bradley: America’s GI General
- Paul R. Bartrop and Michael Dickerman, The Holocaust: An Encyclopedia and Document Collection, (4 vols.)

==== 2017 ====
- Mark Edward Lender and Garry Wheeler Stone, Fatal Sunday: George Washington, the Monmouth Campaign, and the Politics of Battle
- Tonio Andrade, The Gunpowder Age: China, Military Innovation, and the Rise of the West in World History
- Laila Parsons, The Commander: Fawzi al-Qawuqji and the Fight for Arab Independence, 1914–1948
- Michael Livingston and Kelly DeVries, editors. The Battle of Crécy: A Casebook

==== 2016 ====
- David L. Preston, Braddock's Defeat: The Battle of the Monongahela and the Road to Revolution
- Pierre Razoux, The Iran-Iraq War
- Paul Robinson, Grand Duke Nikolai Nikolaevich: Supreme Commander of the Russian Army
- David T. Zabecki, editor. Germany at War: 400 Years of Military History

==== 2015 ====
- Andrew Jackson O'Shaughnessy, The Men Who Lost America: British Leadership, the American Revolution, and the Fate of the Empire
- Alexander Watson, Ring of Steel: Germany and Austria-Hungary at War, 1914–1918
- Michael V. Leggiere, Blucher: Scourge of Napoleon

==== 2014 ====
- Samuel J. Watson, Jackson's Sword: The Army Officer Corps on the American Frontier, 1810–1821 and Peacekeepers and Conquerors: The Army Officer Corps on the American Frontier, 1821–1846
- Geoffrey Parker, War, Climate Change and Catastrophe in the Seventeenth Century
- George W. Gawrych, The Young Ataturk: From Ottoman Soldier to Statesman of Turkey
- Spencer C. Tucker, editor, American Civil War: The Definitive Encyclopedia and Document Collection

==== 2013 ====
- Richard S. Faulkner, School of Hard Knocks: Combat Leadership in the American Expeditionary Forces
- Robert M. Citino, The Wehrmacht Retreats: Fighting a Lost War, 1943
- Geoffrey Roberts, Stalin’s General: The Life of Georgy Zhukov
- Clayton R. Newell and Charles R. Shrader, Of Duty Well and Faithfully Done: A History of the Regular Army in the Civil War

==== 2012 ====
- John Sloan Brown, Kevlar Legions: The Transformation of the U.S. Army, 1989–2005
- Mark Peattie, Edward Drea, and Hans van de Ven (eds.), The Battle for China: Essays on the Military History of the Sino-Japanese War of 1937–1945
- Mungo Melvin, Manstein: Hitler's Greatest General
- Steven E. Clay, US Army Order of Battle 1919–1941 (4 vols.)

==== 2011 ====
- Chad L. Williams, Torchbearers of Democracy: African American Soldiers in the World War I Era
- Peter H. Wilson, The Thirty Years War: Europe's Tragedy
- John MacFarlane, Triquet’s Cross: A Study of Military Heroism
- Clifford J. Rogers, ed. The Oxford Encyclopedia of Medieval Warfare and Military Technology

==== 2010 ====
- Daniel E. Sutherland, A Savage Conflict: The Decisive Role of Guerrillas in the American Civil War
- Edward J. Drea, Japan’s Imperial Army: Its Rise and Fall, 1853–1945
- J.P. Harris, Douglas Haig and the First World War
- Spencer C. Tucker, ed. The Encyclopedia of the Spanish-American and Philippine-American Wars

==== 2009 ====
- Ingo Trauschweizer, The Cold War U.S. Army: Building Deterrence for Limited War.
- Jamel Ostwald, Vauban Under Siege: Engineering Efficiency and Martial Vigor in the War of the Spanish Succession.
- Andy Wiest, Vietnam's Forgotten Army: Heroism and Betrayal in the ARVN.
- Philip Sabin, Hans van Wees, and Michael Whitby, eds. The Cambridge History of Greek and Roman Warfare.

==== 2008 ====
- Jon Latimer, 1812: War with America
- John Lawrence Tone, War and Genocide in Cuba, 1895–1898
- Martha Hannah, Your Death Would Be Mine: Paul and Marie Pireaud in the Great War.
- Spencer C. Tucker, ed. The Encyclopedia of the Cold War: A Political, Social and Military History

==== 2007 ====
- John Grenier, The First Way of War: American War Making on the Frontier, 1607–1814.
- Robert A. Doughty, Pyrrhic Victory: French Strategy and Operations in the Great War.
- Adrian Goldsworthy, Caesar: Life of a Colossus.
- Peter Karsten, ed. Encyclopedia of War and American Society. 3 vols.

==== 2006 ====
- H. P. Willmott, The Battle of Leyte Gulf: The Last Fleet Action
- George Satterfield, Princes, Posts and Partisans: The Army of Louis XIV and Partisan Warfare in the Netherlands (1673–1678)
- Steven E. Woodworth and Kenneth J. Winkle, Atlas of the Civil War
- Colin White, ed., Horatio Nelson, The New Letters

==== 2005 ====
- Edward M. Coffman, The Regulars: The American Army, 1898–1941
- Robert M. Citino, Blitzkrieg to Desert Storm: The Evolution of Operational Warfare
- James T. Controvich, United States Army Unit and Organizational Histories: A Bibliography

==== 2004 ====
- George C. Rable, Fredericksburg! Fredericksburg!
- Terry Copp, Fields of Fire: The Canadians in Normandy
- Joshua Brown, ed., A Good Idea of Hell: Letters from a Chasseur a Pied
- Michael J. Crawford, ed., The Naval War of 1812: A Documentary History: Volume III 1814–1815

==== 2003 ====
- Rick Atkinson, An Army at Dawn: The War in North Africa, 1942–1943
- Hew Strachan, The First World War. Volume I: To Arms
- Stuart Hills, By Tank Into Normandy: A Memoir of the Campaign in North-West Europe From D-Day to VE Day
- David S. Heidler and Jeanne T. Heidler, eds., Encyclopedia of the American Civil War: A Political and Military History (3 vol)

==== 2002 ====
- Mark Stoler, Allies and Adversaries: The Joint Chiefs of Staff, the Grand Alliances, and U.S. Strategy in World War II
- Ronald H. Spector, At War At Sea: Sailors and Naval Combat in the Twentieth Century
- Robert H. Ferrell, editor, for William S. Triplet, A Youth in the Meuse-Argonne, A Colonel in the Armored Divisions, and In the Philippines and Okinawa

==== 2001 ====
- Geoffrey P. Megargee (2000): Inside Hitler's High Command (2000)

== See also ==
- Military history of the United States
- Naval history
