= George Washington Book Prize =

American literary award

The George Washington Book Prize was instituted in 2005 and is awarded annually to the best book on the founding era of the United States; especially ones that have the potential to advance broad public understanding of American history. It is administered by Washington College's C.V. Starr Center for the Study of the American Experience; it is sponsored by Washington College in partnership with the Gilder Lehrman Institute of American History and George Washington's Mount Vernon. At $50,000, the George Washington Book Prize is one of the largest book awards in the United States.

Each year the sponsors appoint a jury of three historians or other qualified scholars who are asked to read all submitted books and narrow the field to three finalists. The finalists are announced at Washington College on or near George Washington's birthday in February. A seven-member committee, made up of two representatives of each of the three sponsoring institutions plus an independent historian, reviews the finalists and chooses a winner. The winner is announced at a gala dinner at Mount Vernon each May that honors the finalists.

== Sponsoring organizations ==
Established in 2000 with a grant from the New York-based Starr Foundation, the C.V. Starr Center for the Study of the American Experience draws on the special historical strengths of Washington College and the Eastern Shore of Maryland. Through educational programs, scholarship, and public outreach, the Starr Center explores the early republic, the rise of democracy, and the manifold ways in which the founding era continues to shape United States culture. In partnership with other institutions and with leading scholars and writers, the center works to promote innovative approaches to the study of history, and to bridge the gaps between historians, contemporary policymakers, and the general public. Washington College was founded in 1782 under the patronage of George Washington, and was the first college chartered in the new nation.

Founded in 1994, the Gilder Lehrman Institute of American History promotes the study and love of American history among audiences ranging from students to scholars to the general public. It creates history-centered schools and academic research centers, organizes seminars and enrichment programs for educators, produces print and electronic publications and traveling exhibitions, and sponsors lectures by eminent historians. In addition to the George Washington Book Prize, the institute also sponsors the Lincoln Prize in conjunction with the Civil War Institute at Gettysburg College, and the Frederick Douglass Prize in cooperation with the Gilder Lehrman Center for the Study of Slavery, Resistance, and Abolition at Yale University.

George Washington's Mount Vernon Estate and Gardens, open to the public since 1858, communicates the character and leadership of Washington to millions of Americans each year through a variety of interpretive programs on the Estate and in classrooms across the nation. Mount Vernon is owned and operated by the Mount Vernon Ladies' Association, founded in 1853, making it the oldest national preservation organization in the United States. The George Washington Book Prize is an important element of the Association's outreach program, which engages millions of teachers and students throughout the nation.

== Past winners ==
Year	Author	Work	Ref.
2005	Ron Chernow	Alexander Hamilton	
2006	Stacy Schiff	A Great Improvisation: Franklin, France, and the Birth of America	
2007	Charles Rappleye	Sons of Providence: The Brown Brothers, the Slave Trade, and the American Revolution	
2008	Marcus Rediker	The Slave Ship: A Human History	
2009	Annette Gordon-Reed	The Hemingses of Monticello: An American Family	
2010	Richard Beeman	Plain, Honest Men: The Making of the American Constitution	
2011	Pauline Maier	Ratification: The People Debate the Constitution: 1787-1788	
2012	Maya Jasanoff	Liberty's Exiles: American Loyalists in the Revolutionary World	
2013	Stephen Brumwell	George Washington: Gentleman Warrior	
2014	Andrew Jackson O'Shaughnessy	The Men Who Lost America: British Leadership, the American Revolution and the Fate of the Empire	
2015	Nick Bunker	An Empire on the Edge: How Britain Came to Fight America	
2015 Special Achievement Award	Lin-Manuel Miranda	Hamilton	
2016	Flora Fraser	The Washingtons: George and Martha, “Join’d by Friendship, Crown’d by Love”	
2017	Nathaniel Philbrick	Valiant Ambition: George Washington, Benedict Arnold, and the Fate of the American Revolution	
2018	Kevin J. Hayes	George Washington: A Life in Books	
2019	Colin Calloway	The Indian World of George Washington: The First President, the First Americans, and the Birth of the Nation	
2020	Rick Atkinson	The British are Coming: The War for America, Lexington to Princeton, 1775-1777	
2021	Mary Beth Norton	1774: The Long Year of Revolution	
2022	Bruce A. Ragsdale	Washington at the Plow: The Founding Farmer and the Question of Slavery	
2023	Maurizio Valsania	First Among Men: George Washington and the Myth of American Masculinity	
2024	David Waldstreicher	The Odyssey of Phillis Wheatley: A Poet's Journeys through American Slavery and Independence	
2025	Tyson Reeder	Serpent in Eden: Foreign Meddling and Partisan Politics in James Madison's America	

== Past finalists ==
= winner

Year	Author	Book
2005	Ron Chernow	Alexander Hamilton
	Rhys Isaac	Landon Carter's Uneasy Kingdom
	Gordon Wood	The Americanization of Benjamin Franklin
2006	Edward G. Lengel	General George Washington: A Military Life
	Stacy Schiff	A Great Improvisation: Franklin, France and the Birth of America
	Stanley Weintraub	America's Battle for Freedom, Britain's Quagmire: 1775-1883
2007	Catherine Allgor	A Perfect Union: Dolley Madison and the Creation of the American Nation
	François Furstenberg	In the Name of the Father: Washington's Legacy, Slavery, and the Making of a Nation
	Charles Rappleye	Sons of Providence: The Brown Brothers, the Slave Trade and the American Revolution
2008	Woody Holton	Unruly Americans and the Origins of the Constitution
	Jon Latimer	1812: War With America
	Marcus Rediker	The Slave Ship: A Human History
2009	Annette Gordon-Reed	The Hemingses of Monticello: An American Family
	Kevin J. Hayes	The Road to Monticello: The Life and Mind of Thomas Jefferson
	Jane Kamensky	The Exchange Artist: A Tale of High-Flying Speculation and America's First Banking Collapse
2010	Richard Beeman	Plain, Honest Men: The Making of the American Constitution
	R. B. Bernstein	The Founding Fathers Reconsidered
	Edith B. Gelles	John and Abigail: Portrait of a Marriage
2011	Pauline Maier	Ratification: The People Debate the Constitution, 1787-1788
	Jack Rakove	Revolutionaries: A New History of the Invention of America
	Alan Taylor	The Civil War of 1812: American Citizens, British Subjects, Irish Rebels, and Indian Allies
2012	John Fea	Was America Founded As A Christian Nation?: A Historical Introduction
	Benjamin H. Irvin	Clothed in Robes of Sovereignty: The Continental Congress and the People Out of Doors
	Maya Jasanoff	Liberty's Exiles: American Loyalists in the Revolutionary World
2013	Stephen Brumwell	George Washington: Gentleman Warrior
	Eliga H. Gould	Among the Powers of the Earth: The American Revolution and the Making of a New World Empire
	Cynthia A. Kierner	Martha Jefferson Randolph, Daughter of Monticello: her Life and Times
	Brian Steele	Thomas Jefferson and American Nationhood
2014	Andrew Jackson O'Shaughnessy	The Men Who Lost America: British Leadership, the American Revolution, and the Fate of the Empire
	Jeffrey L. Pasley	The First Presidential Contest: 1796 and the Founding of American Democracy
	Alan Taylor	The Internal Enemy: Slavery and War in Virginia, 1772-1832
2015	Nick Bunker	An Empire on the Edge: How Britain Came to Fight America
	Richard S. Dunn	A Tale of Two Plantations: Slave Life and Labor in Jamaica and Virginia
	François Furstenberg	When the United States Spoke French: Five Refugees Who Shaped a Nation
	Eric Nelson	The Royalist Revolution: Monarchy and the American Founding
2016	Mary Sarah Bilder	Madison's Hand: Revising the Constitutional Convention
	Kathleen DuVal	Independence Lost: Lives on the Edge of the American Revolution
	Flora Fraser	The Washingtons: George and Martha, "Join’d by Friendship, Crown'd by Love"
	Robert Middlekauff	Washington's Revolution: The Making of America's First Leader
	Janet Polasky	Revolutions without Borders: The Call to Liberty in the Atlantic World
	David Preston	Braddock's Defeat: The Battle of the Monongahela and the Road to Revolution
	John Sedgwick	War of Two: Alexander Hamilton, Aaron Burr, and the Duel that Stunned the Nation
2017	T.H. Breen	George Washington's Journey: The President Forges a New Nation
	Annette Gordon-Reed and Peter S. Onuf	"Most Blessed of the Patriarchs": Thomas Jefferson and the Empire of the Imagination
	Michael Klarman	The Framers' Coup: The Making of the United States Constitution
	Jane Kamensky	A Revolution in Color: The World of John Singleton Copley
	Mark Edward Lender and Garry Wheeler Stone	Fatal Sunday: George Washington, the Monmouth Campaign, and the Politics of Battle
	Nathaniel Philbrick	Valiant Ambition: George Washington, Benedict Arnold, and the Fate of the American Revolution
	Alan Taylor	American Revolutions: A Continental History, 1750-1804
2018	S. Max Edelson	The New Map of Empire: How Britain Imagined America before Independence
	Kevin J. Hayes	George Washington: A Life in Books
	Eric Hinderaker	Boston's Massacre
	Jon Kukla	Patrick Henry: Champion of Liberty
	James E. Lewis, Jr.	The Burr Conspiracy: Uncovering the Story of an Early American Crisis
	Jennifer Van Horn	The Power of Objects in Eighteenth-Century British America
	Douglas L. Winiarski	Darkness Falls on the Land of Light: Experiencing Religious Awakenings in Eighteenth-Century New England
2019	Colin Calloway	The Indian World of George Washington: The First President, the First Americans, and the Birth of the Nation
	Stephen Fried	Rush: Revolution, Madness, and Benjamin Rush, the Visionary Doctor Who Became a Founding Father
	Catherine Kerrison	Jefferson's Daughters: Three Sisters, White and Black, in a Young America
	Joyce Lee Malcolm	The Tragedy of Benedict Arnold: An American Life
	Nathaniel Philbrick	In the Hurricane's Eye: The Genius of George Washington and the Victory at Yorktown
	Russell Shorto	Revolution Song: A Story of American Freedom
	Peter Stark	Young Washington: How Wilderness and War Forged America's Founding Father
2020	Rick Atkinson	The British are Coming: The War for America, Lexington to Princeton, 1775-1777
	Richard Bell	Stolen: Five Free Boys Kidnapped into Slavery and Their Astonishing Odyssey Home
	Matthew R. Costello	The Property of the Nation: George Washington's Tomb, Mount Vernon, and the Memory of the First President
	Douglas Egerton	Heirs of an Honored Name: The Decline of the Adams Family and the Rise of Modern America
	Richard Godbeer	World of Trouble: A Philadelphia Quaker Family's Journey through the American Revolution
	David Head	A Crisis of Peace: George Washington, the Newburgh Conspiracy, and the Fate of the American Revolution
	Martha Saxton	The Widow Washington: The Life of Mary Washington
2021	Mary Beth Norton	1774: The Long Year of Revolution
	Mark Boonshoft	Aristocratic Education and the Making of the American Republic
	Vincent Brown	Tacky's Revolt: The Story of an Atlantic Slave War
	Peter Cozzens	Tecumseh and the Prophet: The Shawnee Brothers Who Defied a Nation
	Honorée Fanonne Jeffers	The Age of Phillis
	Michael W. McConnell	The President Who Would Not Be King: Executive Power under the Constitution
	William G. Thomas III	A Question of Freedom: The Families Who Challenged Slavery from the Nation's Founding to the Civil War
2022	Bruce A. Ragsdale	Washington at the Plow: The Founding Farmer and the Question of Slavery
	Max Edling	Perfecting the Union: National and State Authority in the US Constitution
	Julie Flavell	The Howe Dynasty: The Untold Story of a Military Family and the Women Behind Britain's Wars for America
	Jeffrey H. Hacker	Minds and Hearts: The Story of James Otis Jr. and Mercy Otis Warren
	David O. Stewart	George Washington: The Political Rise of America's Founding Father
2023	Maurizio Valsania	First among Men: George Washington and the Myth of American Masculinity
	Mary Sarah Bilder	Female Genius: Eliza Harriot and George Washington at the Dawn of the Constitution
	Fred Kaplan	His Masterly Pen: A Biography of Jefferson the Writer
	Stacy Schiff	The Revolutionary: Samuel Adams
2024	David Waldstreicher	The Odyssey of Phillis Wheatley: A Poet's Journeys through American Slavery and Independence
	Michael A. Blaakman	Speculation Nation: Land Mania in the Revolutionary American Republic
	Ned Blackhawk	The Rediscovery of America: Native Peoples and the Unmaking of U.S. History
	Cassandra A. Good	First Family: George Washington's Heirs and the Making of America
	Cynthia A. Kierner	The Tory's Wife: A Woman and Her Family in Revolutionary America
2025	Tyson Reeder	Serpent in Eden: Foreign Meddling and Partisan Politics in James Madison’s America
	Jane E. Calvert	Penman of the Founding: A Biography of John Dickinson
	Francis D. Cogliano	A Revolutionary Friendship: Washington, Jefferson, and the American Republic
	Michael D. Hattem	The Memory of ’76: The Revolution in American History
	Cara Rogers Stevens	Thomas Jefferson and the Fight Against Slavery
