= C.V. Starr Center for the Study of the American Experience =

Institute promoting research and study of American history and culture

The Starr Center for the Study of the American Experience is an institute at Washington College, in Chestertown, Maryland, that promotes the research and study of American history and culture. Founded in 2000, the Starr Center at Washington College is one of many educational initiatives funded by the Starr Foundation, a private foundation with assets of over $1.25 billion. The inaugural director of the Starr Center, Edward L. Widmer, served under Bill Clinton as special assistant to the president for national security affairs; among other accomplishments, he wrote foreign policy speeches and advised the president on topics related to history and scholarship as senior advisor to the president for special projects. Since 2006, Adam Goodheart, a historian, journalist and author of 1861: The Civil War Awakening, has served as director of the Center. In addition to its academic components, the C.V. Starr Center works closely with external groups to sponsor events of public interest, such as the Poplar Grove Project, a recovery and recordation project in collaboration with the Maryland State Archives, and hosts readings and lectures often focused on topics of local interest, such as Chesapeake Bay history.

== Location and history ==
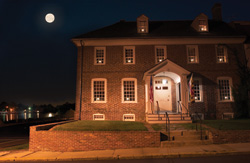
18th century Custom House

The Starr Center for the Study of the American Experience is headquartered in Chestertown’s Custom House, a building constructed in the 1740s by Samuel Massey as a residence for the Ringgold family and known for its detailed Flemish bond brickwork with glazed headers., The location, beside the public dock at the intersection of High and Water Streets, has always been central to much of Chestertown’s daily activity in commerce, industry, and tourism. Over its 200+ year history, the Custom House has changed hands several times. Senator James Alfred Pearce, who later chaired the Joint Library Committee of Congress and served on the Smithsonian Institution’s Board of Regents, lived in the Custom House in the late 19th century. One of the building’s most influential owners, Wilbur Ross Hubbard, carried out a major renovation and restoration project in the 1970s before bequeathing the house to Washington College. The front portico is another recent addition, designed by consultant Michael Bourne to integrate local motifs. Buildings of this style, size, and period are now rare in the territory that once comprised the original 13 colonies. In 1969, the National Park Service recognized the Custom House on the National Survey of Historic Sites and Buildings. In addition to the C.V. Starr Center, the Custom House serves as home to the Center for Environment & Society and the Washington College Archaeology Lab.

== Events, programs, and projects ==
The Starr Center hosts numerous public events, including talks by visiting authors, museum programs, concerts, panel discussions and public conversations on American culture. Recent speakers have included Senators Birch Bayh and Richard Lugar, filmmaker John Waters, actress Anna Deavere Smith, journalist Michael Meyer, civil rights attorney Sherrilyn Ifill, novelist James McBride and historians James McPherson, Annette Gordon-Reed and David Blight.

The “History on the Waterfront” multimedia program, launched in 2009, is a free thirty-minute audio-guided tour recreating the sights and sounds of an 18th-century working waterfront. The tour provides a walk back in time into an era when local streets bustled with revolutionaries and convicts, slave traders, British soldiers and heroes of the Underground Railroad. “History on the Waterfront” was researched, written and performed by Washington College students, faculty and staff, along with members of the Chestertown community, and includes narrative, music, reenactments and firsthand accounts of life in the colonial port. The program was orchestrated by the Starr Center's associate director, Jill Ogline Titus, and narrated by the Center’s director, Adam Goodheart. The Center’s program manager, Michael Buckley, who also produces the weekly radio series "Voices of the Chesapeake Bay" on 103.1 WRNR, oversaw the technical aspects of the production. The “History on the Waterfront” tour is free of charge and available year-round.

The Riverfront Concert Series, which debuted in 2010, offers free musical performances throughout the summer on the riverfront lawn of the Custom House. Performers in the 2010 series included singer-songwriter Bob Zentz and acoustic guitar duo Mac Walter & John Cronin. The series builds on the Starr Center’s longstanding interest in the musical traditions of Chesapeake Bay and its rich heritage of storytelling.

The Poplar Grove Plantation, near Centreville, Maryland, is the location of the Poplar Grove Project, an ongoing exploration of the Emory family’s papers, some dating back as far as the 17th century. Starr Center director Adam Goodheart began initial excavations at Poplar Grove in 2003 with the Archaeology Field School at Washington College, and in 2008, one of his students discovered the collection of papers. In conjunction with the Maryland State Archives, the Poplar Grove project seeks to preserve, document and study this large collection. Current Poplar Grove owner James Wood, a descendant of the Emory family, has been a source of information for Goodheart’s students as they participate in the project. His mother, Mary Wood, published a book about the Emory women called My Darling Alice: Based on Letters and Legends of an Eastern Shore of Maryland Farm – 1837 – 1935. To date, over 28,406 documents have been recovered and scanned into digital files that will be published online.

The George Washington Book Prize recognizes the year's best books on the nation's founding era, especially those with the potential to advance broad public understanding of American history. Sponsored by Washington College, the Gilder Lehrman Institute of American History, and George Washington’s Mount Vernon, and administered by the Starr Center, the $50,000 award is one of the largest literary prizes in America. In 2005, the inaugural book prize was awarded to Ron Chernow for his biography Alexander Hamilton. Other winners have included Richard Beeman (2010) for Plain, Honest Men: The Making of the American Constitution, Annette Gordon-Reed (2009) for The Hemingses of Monticello, Marcus Rediker (2008) for The Slave Ship: A Human History, and Stacy Schiff (2006) for A Great Improvisation: Franklin, France, and the Birth of America. In 2011, Pauline Maier was awarded the prize for her book Ratification: The People Debate the Constitution. 1787–1788.

The Patrick Henry Writing Fellowship offers a nine-month residency to authors doing innovative work on America’s founding era and its legacy. Launched by the Starr Center in 2008, the fellowship is permanently endowed as part of a $2.5 million challenge grant from the National Endowment for the Humanities’ “We the People” initiative. The Henry Fellowship includes a $45,000 stipend and residency in the restored circa-1735 Patrick Fellows’ Residence. Co-sponsored by the Rose O’Neill Literary House, Washington College’s center for literature and the literary arts, the fellowship aims to encourage reflection on the links between American history and contemporary culture, and to foster the literary art of historical writing. The annual application deadline is February 15. Inaugural Patrick Henry Writing Fellow, historian and author Henry Wiencek, spent his residency working on an upcoming book about Thomas Jefferson and his slaves and teaching a class at Washington College. The 2009–10 fellowship recipient, Marla Miller, recently published a biography of flag-maker Betsy Ross, Betsy Ross and the Making of America, completed during her residence.

The Patrick Henry Fellows’ Residence, known traditionally as the Buck-Chambers House, has strong connections to three centuries of American history. Its past owners include a British merchant active in the convict trade to Chesapeake Bay, a Revolutionary War officer who served with George Washington in the famous New York campaign of 1776, and a U.S. senator who led a Kent County militia company into battle during the War of 1812. Purchased by Washington College in 2007, the house underwent a year-long restoration before welcoming the first Patrick Henry Visiting Fellow in September 2008.

The Hodson Trust – John Carter Brown Fellowship supports work by academics, independent scholars and writers working on significant projects relating to the literature, history, culture or art of the Americas before 1830. The fellowship is also open to filmmakers, novelists, creative and performing artists, and others working on projects that draw on this period of history. The award supports two months of research at the John Carter Brown Library in Providence, RI, and two months of writing at the Starr Center, and comes with a stipend of $20,000, plus housing and university privileges at both institutions. The annual application deadline is March 15.
