= The Revolutionary =

The Revolutionary may refer to:

- The Revolutionary (1917 film), a Russian silent film
- The Revolutionary (1965 film), Canadian satirical film by Jean Pierre Lefebvre
- The Revolutionary (1970 film), American political drama film by Paul Williams
- The Revolutionary: Samuel Adams, 2022 biography by Stacy Schiff
- The Revolutionaries (TV series), 2026 Indian period drama television series
