= Edward G. Lengel =

American author and military historian (born 1968)

- Born: August 9, 1968 (age 58)
- Writing career
- Genre: military history
- Notable work: General George Washington: A Military Life
- Notable awards: a co-recipient of the National Humanities Medal (for his work on the George Washington Papers project)

Edward "Ed" G. Lengel (born August 9, 1968) is an American author and military historian. His previously published books focus on George Washington's life and legacy, and World War I.

He is a co-recipient of the National Humanities Medal (for his work on the George Washington Papers project), and his books have been honored with the Army Historical Foundation Distinguished Book Award, the Norman B. Tomlinson, Jr. prize, and other awards. He is the author of General George Washington: A Military Life, which was a finalist for the 2006 George Washington Book Prize, and his 2018 release Never in Finer Company: The Men of the Great War’s Lost Battalion.

== Professional background ==
While working on his B.A., Lengel worked at the George Mason University Law Library, 1990–1991. Lengel began his professional career at the University of Virginia. From his beginnings as a research assistant in the University of Virginia Library, he rose to become an Assistant Professor and Assistant Editor in 1997 on the George Washington Papers Project.

From 2010–2016 he was Professor and Director of the project that he renamed the Washington Papers Project. During Lengel's tenure, he oversaw the creation of the Barbados Diary, Martha Washington Papers and Washington Family Papers projects, and was the co-editor and then editor of The Papers of George Washington, Revolutionary War Series, volumes 3–4, 11, 13, 15, 18, and 20.

In 2016 Lengel left academia and relocated from Charlottesville, VA to Washington, D.C. to take on the role of Chief Historian for the White House Historical Association. The David M. Rubenstein National Center for White House History is the Association's institute for White House research and education.

In 2018, Colonial Williamsburg announced that Lengel would be their Revolutionary in Residence whereby Lengel will author the historical text of a new edition of “Colonial Williamsburg: The Official Guide.”

Lengel has occupied other advisory and board positions including:

- Humanities Advisor, World War I and America, a NEH-funded educational project of the Library of America (wwiamerica.org)
- Advisory Board, United States World War One Centennial Commission.
- Trustee, Woodrow Wilson Presidential Library Foundation, Staunton, VA, July 2011-July 2013.
- Service as chair of Library and Archives Committee, and member of Education Committee.
- Citizen Advisory Council, Virginia Commission on the Centennial of Woodrow Wilson's Presidency, July 2011 – 2012
- Board of Directors, World War I Memorial Project, July 2011 – Present

== Honors and awards ==
Lengel's honors include the National Humanities Medal, received for his work with the Washington Papers Project. He secured the Norman B. Tomlinson, Jr. book prize, and the Rawlings Prize, and he has been recognized by the Army Historical Foundation and the U.S. Military History Group.

- Outstanding Book Award, Army Historical Foundation for Thunder and Flames, 2015
- Master Corporal Jan Stanislaw Jakobczak Memorial Book Award, U.S. Military History Group for Thunder and Flames, 2015
- Outstanding Professor Award, University of Virginia Inter-Sorority Council, 2015
- George Washington Masonic Memorial Award, for scholarship on George Washington, 2014.
- Norman B. Tomlinson, Jr., book prize for To Conquer Hell: The Meuse-Argonne, 1918; The Western Front Association, 2008.
- National Humanities Medal (with Washington Papers Project), 2005
- General and Mrs. Matthew B. Ridgway Military History Research Grant, U.S. Army Military History Institute, 2003.
- Rawlings Prize (Albemarle County Historical Society), 1999 and 2001. Governor's Fellowship (University of Virginia), 1995–1996.
- Dumas Malone Traveling Fellowship (University of Virginia), 1994–1995.

== Published works ==
- The Irish through British eyes: perceptions of Ireland in the Famine era, Greenwood, 2002, ISBN 978-0-275-97634-7
- World War I memories: an annotated bibliography of personal accounts published in English since 1919, Scarecrow, 2004, ISBN 978-0-8108-5008-8
- General George Washington: A Military Life, Random House, 2005, ISBN 978-1-4000-6081-8 (reprint Random House, Inc., 2008, ISBN 978-0-8129-6950-4)
- This Glorious Struggle: George Washington's Revolutionary War Letters, Editor Edward G. Lengel, Smithsonian Books, 2007, ISBN 978-0-06-125131-3
- To Conquer Hell: The Meuse-Argonne, 1918, Macmillan, 2008, ISBN 978-0-8050-7931-9 (2nd edition Henry Holt and Co., 2009, ISBN 978-0-8050-8915-8)
- Inventing George Washington: America's Founder, in Myth and Memory, Harper, 2011, ISBN 978-0-061-66258-4
- First Entrepreneur: How George Washington Built His--and the Nation's--Prosperity, Da Capo Press, 2016, ISBN 978-0-306-82347-3
- Thunder and Flames: Americans in the Crucible of Combat, 1917-1918, University Press of Kansas, 2015, ISBN 978-0-7006-2084-5
- Never in Finer Company: The Men of the Great War's Lost Battalion, Da Capo Press, 2018, ISBN 978-0306825682

== Tours and talks ==
Throughout his career, Lengel gave speeches and presentations related to his research as he believes, "engaging with and fellow historians is one of the great joys of being an author." Presentations include those about his published works, such as his February, 2011 talk at Mount Vernon at the David M. Rubenstein Leadership Hall at The Fred W. Smith National Library to discuss his book First Entrepreneur: How George Washington Built His--and the Nation's—Prosperity. Or his 2017 talk, "Testing the American Way of War: Doughboys in Combat, 1917–1918" at the George C. Marshall Foundation.
