= Shenandoah 1862 =

2008 book by Peter Cozzens

Shenandoah 1862: Stonewall Jackson's Valley Campaign
- Cover
- Author: Peter Cozzens
- Language: English
- Subject: Jackson's Valley campaign
- Genre: Non-fiction
- Publisher: University of North Carolina Press
- Publication date: 2008
- Publication place: United States
- Pages: 623
- ISBN: 978-0-8078-3200-4

Shenandoah 1862: Stonewall Jackson's Valley Campaign is a 2008 book written by Peter Cozzens and published by the University of North Carolina Press. The book studies Jackson's Valley campaign, an 1862 operation during the American Civil War. Shenandoah 1862 is sourced to both primary and secondary sources, including previously unpublished primary source material. While previous works on the campaign generally focused on the Confederate perspective of the campaign, Cozzens's work also incorporates Union material. It also challenges the traditional interpretation of inept Union leadership and an outstanding performance by Confederate commander Thomas J. "Stonewall" Jackson, although one reviewer viewed Cozzens's criticism of Jackson as too harsh. While a reviewer for the Virginia Magazine of History and Biography noted several minor errors in the work, most reviewers praised the work for its objectivity and use of primary sources, with some predicting that Shenandoah 1862 would become the go-to work about Jackson's Valley campaign. The book was also described as demonstrating revisionist tendencies.

== Content ==
Shenandoah 1862: Stonewall Jackson's Valley Campaign was written by Peter Cozzens, an experienced military history writer, and published by the University of North Carolina Press in 2008. While the book focuses on Confederate general Thomas J. "Stonewall" Jackson and his Shenandoah Valley campaign, an 1862 operation during the American Civil War, the book begins in late 1861, when Jackson was first transferred to the Shenandoah Valley. The book is sourced to both primary and secondary sources. In particular, a number of previously unpublished primary sources from the Union perspective were consulted by Cozzens. One reviewer stated that Shenandoah 1862 uses the relevant primary sources more than any other book about the campaign. It is illustrated and contains 13 maps, an index, and a bibliography.

One of Cozzens's conclusions is that Union Army failings during the campaign are less attributable to the alleged incompetence of Union military leadership, as has been traditionally concluded, but instead is due to mishandling by the administration of President of the United States Abraham Lincoln. Lincoln's active interference in the campaign included transferring troops away from other campaigns and focusing too much on the safety of Washington, D.C. Other themes of the book include the strategic nature of the Shenandoah Valley to the Confederacy and Jackson's maturation as a military officer. The author also criticizes Jackson's leadership for excessive secrecy and a tendency to deploy his units in piecemeal fashion, although Union errors are also mentioned. One reviewer noted that Shenandoah 1862 was the first major book about the campaign to include a significant study of both sides of the campaign; two previous works had approached the topic from the Confederate perspective. Cozzens also included civilian perspectives in the work. Cozzens's original analysis is largely confined to the very beginning and the very end of the book, leaving the middle portion largely for narrative.

== Reception ==
Johnathan C. Sheppard, of Florida State University, reviewed Shenandoah 1862 for The Historian. Sheppard predicted that the book would become the go-to resource on the campaign, passing Stonewall in the Valley by Robert G. Tanner. While he also noted that the book's battle narratives could be confusing at times, Sheppard praised Shenandoah 1862 for challenging myths about the campaign and approaching it from a balanced perspective. While reviewing the book for the Journal of Southern History, John R. Lundberg of Collin College stated that Cozzens's thorough research, including his use of primary sources, lent additional credibility to the book's "revisionist conclusions" in confronting the Confederate-slanted bias of many previous works on the topic. While noting that the amount of detail included in Shenandoah 1862 could potentially be confusing for readers, Lundberg stated that Cozzens "[shook] loose of veneer of invincibility that has long accompanied Jackson and his army" and predicted that Shenandoah 1862 would be the primary reference about Jackson's Valley campaign.

Michael W. Coffey, reviewing for the North Carolina Historical Review, noted that Shenandoah 1862 provided a rare balanced perspective on the campaign by discussing Union successes and asserting that Union failures during the campaign cannot entirely be blamed on the field commanders, a treatment Coffey described as "restoring a needed dose of realism". While Coffey stated that a brief mention by Cozzens that the campaign almost became a secondary theater of operations for the Confederates could have addressed in more detail, he also described Shenandoah 1862 as the best campaign study available at the time of his review. A 2008 reviewer for Library Journal stated that Shenandoah 1862 was "sure to become the standard work on the campaign" and recommended it for collectors.

Gordon Berg, reviewing for Civil War Times stated that the book was a modern look at the campaign, well-researched, and a "magesterial examination". Gary Ecelbarger, while reviewing Shenandoah 1862 for the Virginia Magazine of History and Biography, praised Cozzens for using previously unpublished quality sources, while avoiding more dubious sources that had been used in previous campaign histories. However, he also stated that some of Cozzens' conclusions are "reasonable but are not always convincing". As an example, Ecelbarger identified an instance where Cozzens criticized an officer for breaking the military principal of not reinforcing failure, when that action led to victory. Additionally, several minor errors in the book were also noted, including instances of incorrect ranks being provided, errors in distances between geographic points, and two maps whose drawings are not consistent with the prose descriptions. Overall, Ecelbarger noted that the errors were infrequent enough to avoid causing significant issues and that Shenandoah 1862 "stands out as a superlative narrative".

In a review for On Point, a publication of the Army Historical Foundation, Steven Greaf praised Shenandoah 1862 for its objective approach, and noted Cozzens's attention to the strategy and tactics of the campaign, as well as the detail given to the terrain of the theater of operations, describing the book as an "enjoyable read". Valerie L. Hudson reviewed the work for the Register of the Kentucky Historical Society and noted the variety of conclusions Cozzens drew about the Union leadership of the campaign: noting that Nathaniel P. Banks showed some talent, that some of the factors affecting John C. Frémont were outside of his control, and portraying James Shields as inept, all the while criticizing elements of Jackson's leadership. Hudson stated that enough material was presented in the book that additional space could have been given for analysis in the conclusion. While praising the quality of the individual battle maps contained in the book, Hudson opined that the single map portraying the entire theater was lacking. Overall, she concluded that the most important part of Shenandoah 1862 was its description of the "interplay between military and political realities".

While stating that the book was well-researched, reviewer James I. Robertson of the journal Louisiana History questioned some of the works' conclusions, in particular those related to Jackson. Robertson wondered if some of the criticism leveled at Jackson was done solely to be revisionist, stating that Cozzens sometimes "confuses hypocrisy with practicality" in relation to his view of Jackson's secrecy and noted that behavior of Jackson's that has historically been attributed to eccentricity was treated by Cozzens as personal flaws.

== Sources ==
- Berg, Gordon (2009). "A Fresh Look at 1862's Valley Campaign". Civil War Times. 48 (2): 66. ISSN 1546-9980.
- Coffey, Michael W. (2009). "Shenandoah 1862: Stonewall Jackson's Valley Campaign". North Carolina Historical Review. 86 (4): 457–458. ISSN 0029-2494.
- Ecelbarger, Gary (2009). "Shenandoah 1862: Stonewall Jackson's Valley Campaign". Virginia Magazine of History and Biography. 117 (1): 69–70. ISSN 0042-6636.
- Greaf, Steven (2009). "Shenandoah 1862: Stonewall Jackson's Valley Campaign". On Point. 15 (1): 51. JSTOR 26360419.
- Hudson, Valerie L. (2008). "Shenandoah 1862: Stonewall Jackson's Valley Campaign by Peter Cozzens". Register of the Kentucky Historical Society. 106 (2): 274–275. JSTOR 23387992.
- Lundberg, John R. (2010). "Shenandoah 1862: Stonewall Jackson's Valley Campaign". Journal of Southern History. 76 (2): 453–454. ISSN 0022-4642.
- Poremba, David Lee (2008). "Cozzens, Peter. Shenandoah 1862: Stonewall Jackson's Valley Campaign". Library Journal. 133 (12): 92. ISSN 0363-0277.
- Robertson, James I. (2010). "Shenandoah 1862: Stonewall Jackson's Valley Campaign". Louisiana History. 51 (2): 253–255. JSTOR 25699409.
- "Shenandoah 1862: Stonewall Jackson's Valley Campaign". Publishers Weekly. 255 (28): 55. 2008. ISSN 0000-0019.
- Sheppard, Jonathan C. (2010). "Shenandoah 1862: Stonewall Jackson's Valley Campaign - By Peter Cozzens". The Historian. 72 (4): 918–919. doi:10.1111/j.1540-6563.2010.00281_7.x. ISSN 0018-2370. S2CID 143158657.
