= National Museum of the United States Army =

Official US Army Museum at Fort Belvoir, Virginia

- Museum logo

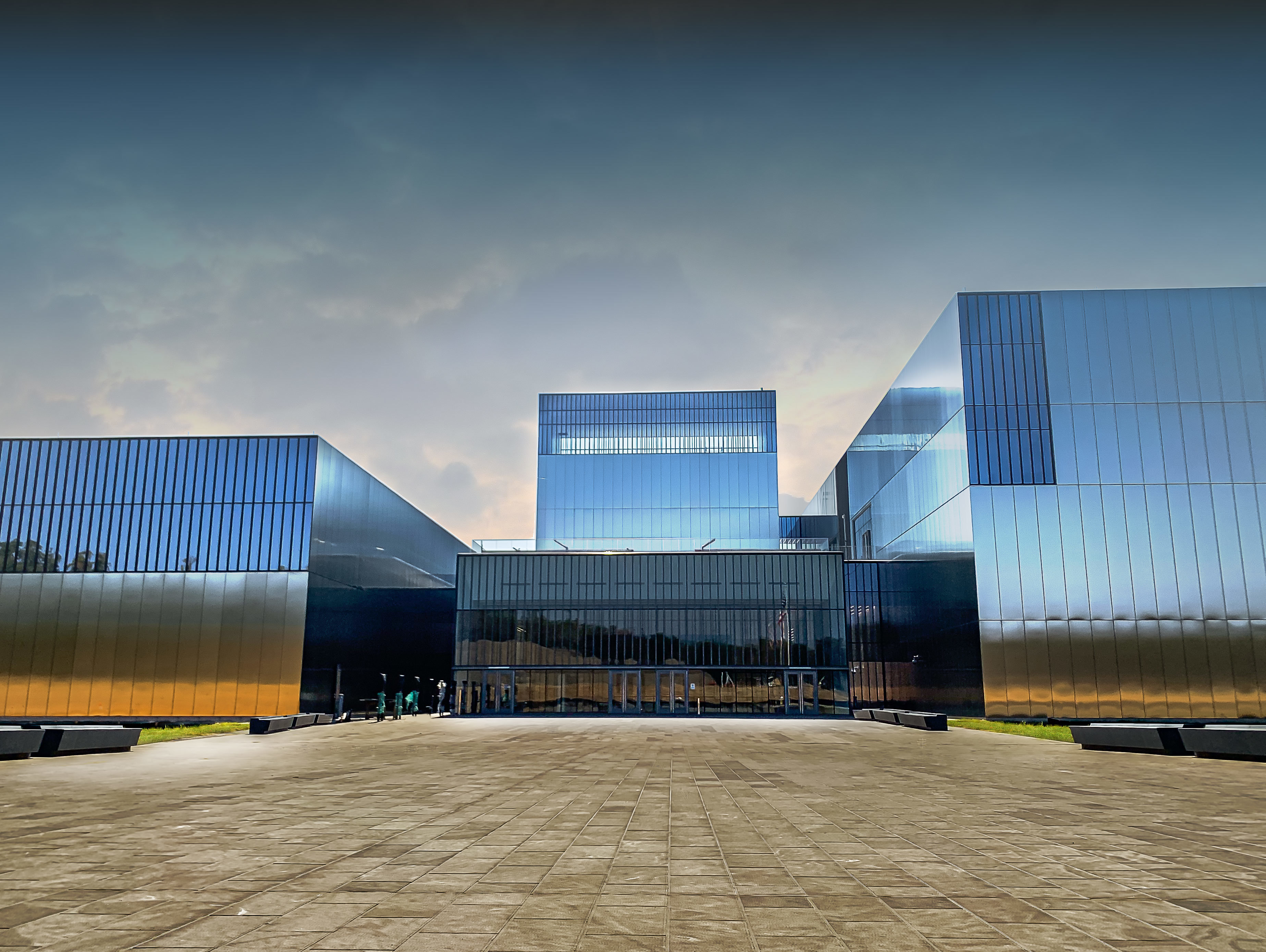
- Museum entrance
- Established: 2020
- Location: 1775 Liberty Drive, Fort Belvoir, Virginia, U.S.
- Coordinates: 38°43′21″N 77°10′12″W
- Type: Military history
- Director: Paul Morando
- Owner: United States Army
- Website: thenmusa.org

The National Museum of the United States Army is the official museum for the history of the United States Army. It opened on November 11, 2020, and is located on 84 acres at Fort Belvoir, Virginia, 20 miles south of Washington, D.C. Its stated objectives are to honor America's soldiers, preserve Army history, and educate the public about the Army's role in American history.

Ground was broken for the museum in September 2016, and it was scheduled to open on June 4, 2020. That opening was delayed as some of the gallery finishing work was suspended in response to COVID-19. The U.S. Army announced on April 16, 2020 that the museum would delay its opening due to the COVID-19 pandemic.

The main building is approximately 185,000 square feet and displays selections from the United States Army Center of Military History. Outside this facility is a park with gardens and a parade ground. Space is included to accommodate ceremonies, reenactments, lectures, educational programs, and reunions.

== History ==
Under a September 2000 agreement with the Department of the Army, the Army Historical Foundation (AHF) was designated the fundraising entity for the National Museum of the United States Army. The Army also established the National Museum of the United States Army Project Office to oversee the design and construction of the museum.

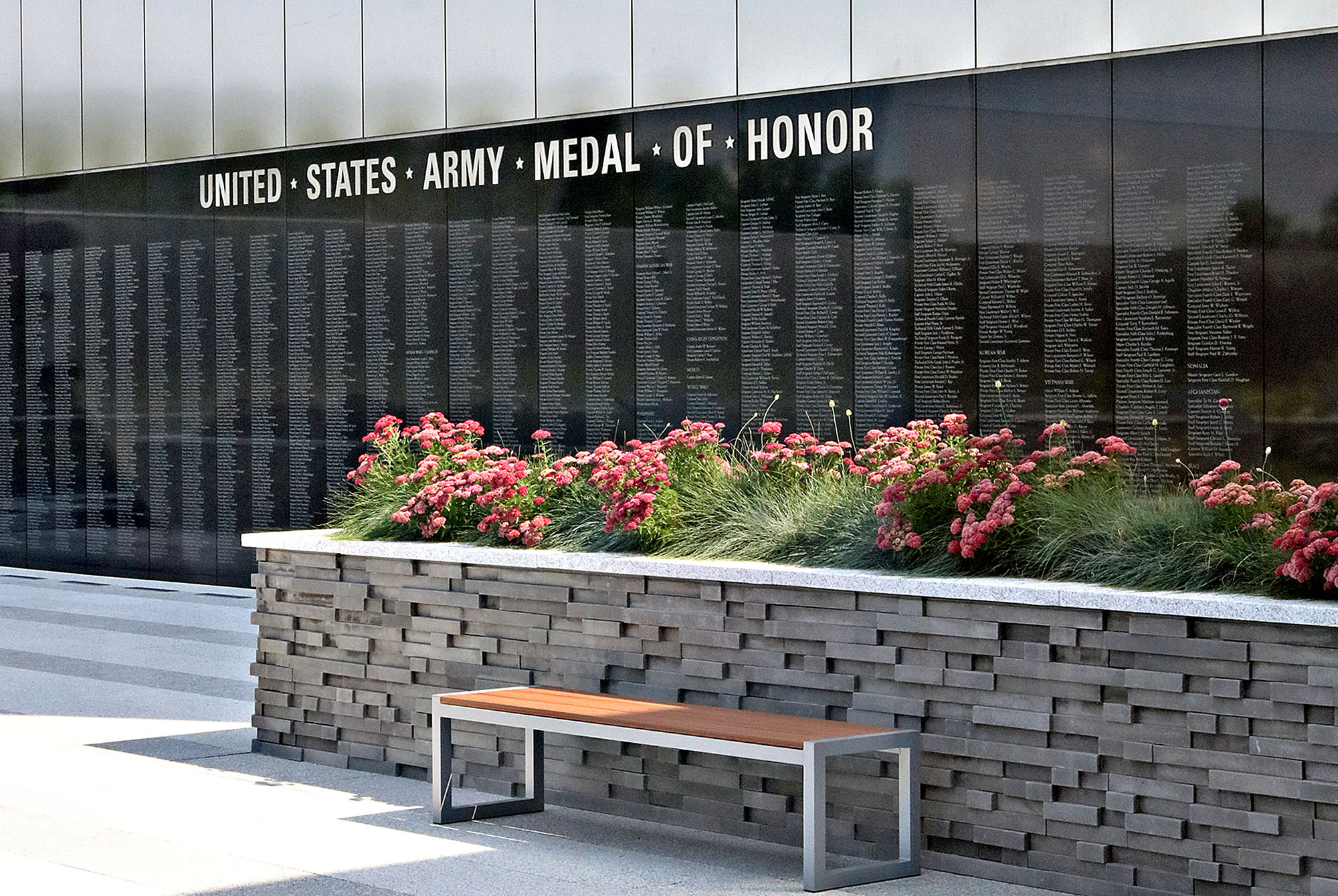
Looking at the Medal of Honor Wall, National Museum of the United States Army

In September 2008, the army selected Skidmore, Owings & Merrill of New York as the design architect and Christopher Chadbourne & Associates of Boston as the exhibit design firm. In 2012, Eisterhold Associates, Inc., assumed the exhibit planning and Design and Production, Inc. began the exhibit fabrication. The U.S. Army will operate and maintain the museum when it opens and AHF will be responsible for all revenue-generating operations.

== Objectives ==
The National Museum of the United States Army describes its objectives as:

- Educate and engage current and future generations about the Army and its contributions
- Preserve the Army's history and its prominent role in the nation's past, present, and future
- Honor Army values, such as patriotism, respect, loyalty, and integrity, while providing an understanding of what it means to serve
- Pay tribute to fourteen generations of American soldiers whose leadership, selfless service, and personal sacrifice have forged and safeguarded our nation
- Inspire soldiers of today by connecting their experience to the legacy and leadership of a great nation
- Stimulate the youth of America to pursue scholastic excellence in any field of study that supports the Army's core missions.
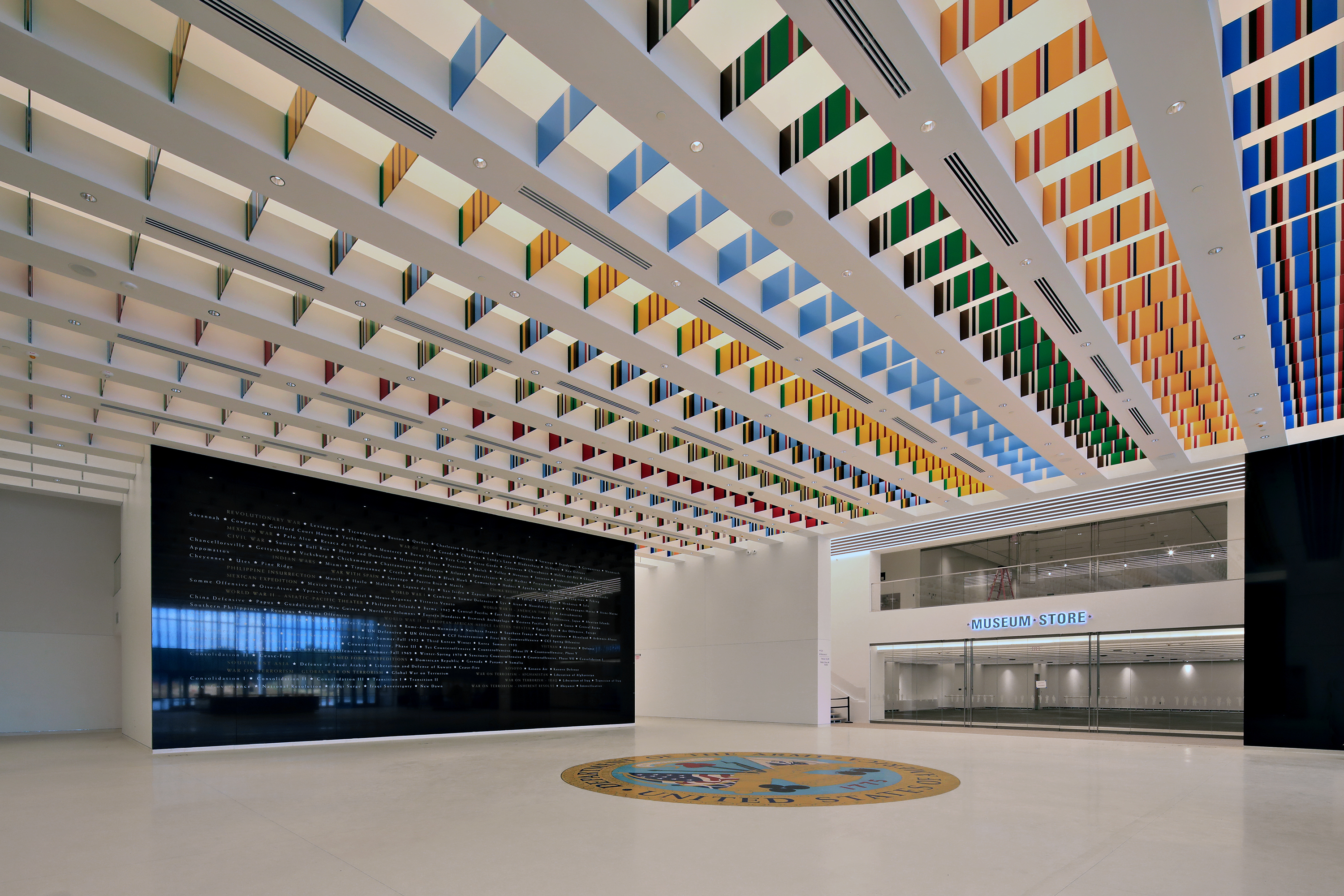
  The museum main lobby

== Design ==
The centerpiece of the National Museum of the United States Army will be a major exhibition facility where the stories of soldiers will be joined with thousands of artifacts, documents, and images tracing the history of the United States Army through a series of chronological and thematic galleries.

In September 2008, the Army selected Skidmore, Owings & Merrill of New York as the design architect and Christopher Chadbourne & Associates of Boston as the exhibit design firm. In 2012, Eisterhold Associates Inc. assumed the exhibit planning and Design and Production, Inc. began the exhibit fabrication.

== Fort Belvoir North Post location ==
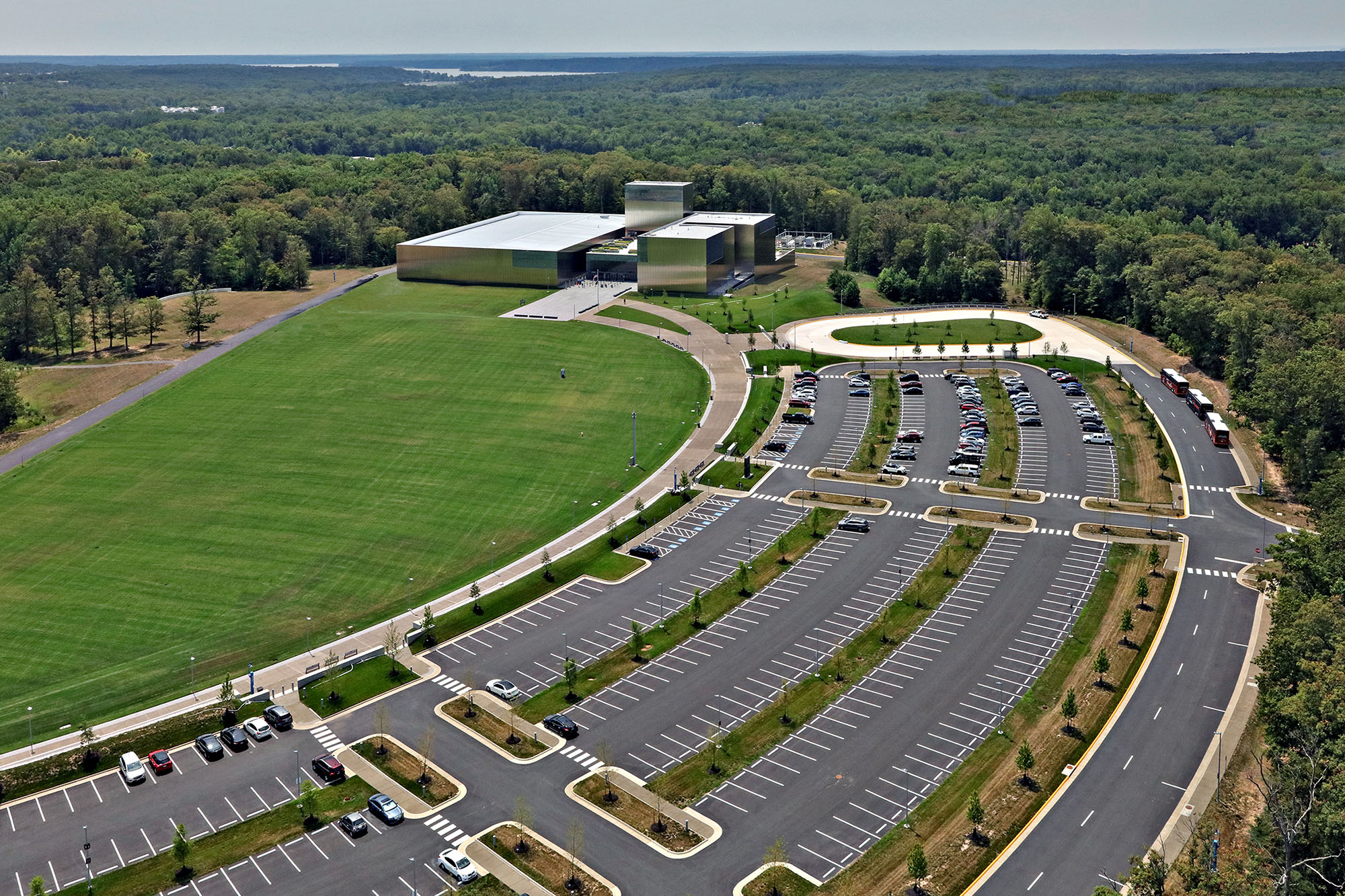
National Museum of the United States Army Looking SE

On 17 June 2011 the Department of Defense released a press release, stating:

The army announced today that the North Post of Fort Belvoir, Virginia., will be the site of the National Museum of the U.S. Army (NMUSA), scheduled to open in June 2015. Secretary of the Army John M. McHugh approved the decision this week, which also marked the Army's 236th birthday. Initial construction will include a multi-story, main museum building with exhibit halls, theater, Veterans' Hall, food service and retail areas, administrative areas, an experiential learning center and a lobby with visitor reception area.

Fort Belvoir is spread over several locations, but the main base is in Fairfax County, Virginia and occupies the former "Belvoir" estate of William Fairfax. The post is bisected by US Route 1 ("Richmond Highway"): the area of Ft. Belvoir between US Route 1 and the Potomac River is the "South Post", while the area between US Route 1 and Telegraph Road is the "North Post". The site for the museum is on the North Post, along the Fairfax County Parkway at the intersection with Kingman Road. The address, 1775 Liberty Drive, is a nod to the year of the Army's founding.

Ft. Belvoir is about 20 miles south of Washington D.C., and 3 miles south of George Washington's historic Mount Vernon estate, which draws over one million visitors per year.

== Opening ceremony ==
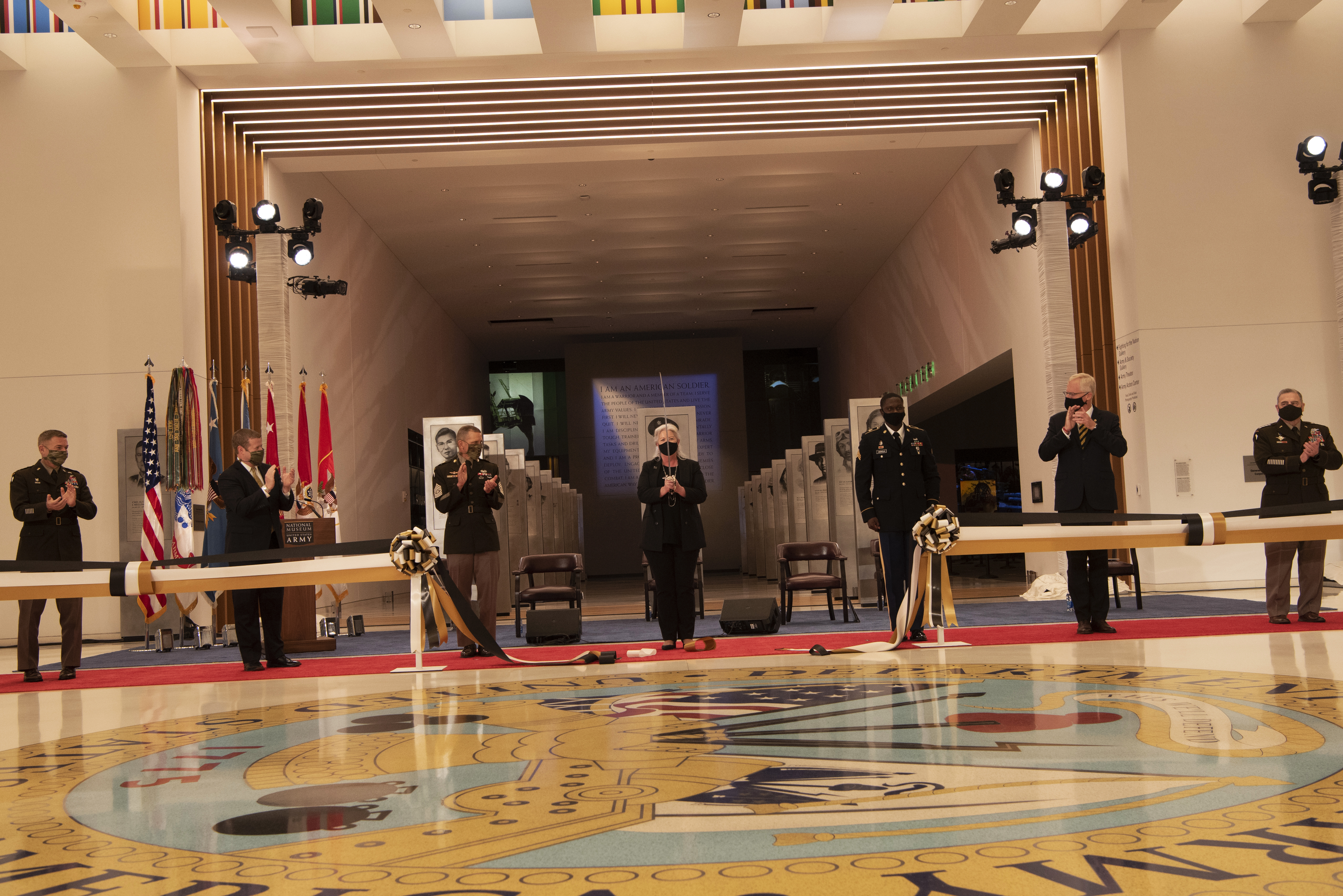
Museum Director Tammy Call cuts a ribbon with a ceremonial sword to officially open the museum to the public.

The museum opened to the public on Veterans Day in November 2020. The ceremony was attended by acting Secretary of Defense Christopher C. Miller and Secretary of the Army Ryan D. McCarthy, both former Army officers. Also attending were Chairman of the Joint Chiefs of Staff Army General Mark A. Milley, Army Chief of Staff General James C. McConville and Sergeant Major of the Army Michael A. Grinston.

== See also ==
- Military history of the United States
- National Museum of the Marine Corps
- National Museum of the United States Air Force
- National Museum of the United States Navy
