= The Indian World of George Washington =

The Indian World of George Washington: The First President, the First Americans, and the Birth of the Nation
- Author: Colin G. Calloway
- Subject: Biography, United States history
- Published: April 2018 (Oxford University Press)
- Pages: 640
- ISBN: 9780190652166

The Indian World of George Washington: The First President, the First Americans, and the Birth of the Nation is a book-length biography of George Washington with a focus on his relations with Native Americans. It was written by Colin G. Calloway and published by Oxford University Press in 2018.

== Synopsis ==
The book examines George Washington’s life through the lens of his relationships with Native American nations. The book argues that Washington’s military career, land ambitions, and presidency were deeply intertwined with the presence and resistance of Indigenous peoples. Drawing on Washington’s role in frontier warfare, diplomacy, and Indian policy, Calloway shows how the founding of the United States was inseparable from the dispossession of Native nations. The book concludes that, despite Washington's intentions, his policies eroded Native American rights and sovereignty he claimed to protect.

The book integrates the perspectives of Native leaders such as Cornplanter, Joseph Brant, and Little Turtle, framing them as strategic actors in a contest over land, sovereignty, and survival during the early American republic.

== Reception ==
The Indian World of George Washington received widespread critical acclaim. It was a finalist for the 2018 National Book Award for Nonfiction, and won the George Washington Prize for American History.

Peter Cozzens, writing in the Wall Street Journal, praised the book: "The fateful relationship between George Washington and the Indian tribes that bordered the new Republic is the subject of Colin Calloway’s brilliantly presented and refreshingly original The Indian World of George Washington … An essential new entry in the literature of George Washington and the early Republic."

The New York Review of Books wrote: "[Calloway] dismisses the old Eurocentric stereotypes of Indians as savages, whether bloodthirsty or noble [and] he searches for Native Americans’ own voices as they desperately struggled to defend and preserve their autonomy, land, communities, and traditions against white America’s inexorable drive to spread onto their soil...Calloway is deeply ambivalent about Washington’s part in the Indian world, including his unsuccessful efforts to protect Indian territory and his wish to steer Native Americans toward assimilation into white society."

Publishers Weekly noted: "Calloway does not shy away from detailing Washington’s violence toward Native communities, including an infamous command to torch Iroquois cornfields, and he includes the perspectives of Native Americans whenever possible. Even so, it’s Washington who emerges as the most fully‑formed character; the Native leaders Calloway mentions, however intriguing, receive less attention, suggesting another book awaits writing on the subject."

Kirkus Reviews said the book was "Insightful and illuminating but relentlessly squirm‑inducing," writing, "Calloway is no revisionist. Historians agree that Washington’s treatment of Indians was marked by self-interest, ignorance, and racism, but they prefer to emphasize areas where he did better."
