= Andrew O'Shaughnessy (historian) =

British-American historian (born 1959)

Andrew O'Shaughnessy FRHS
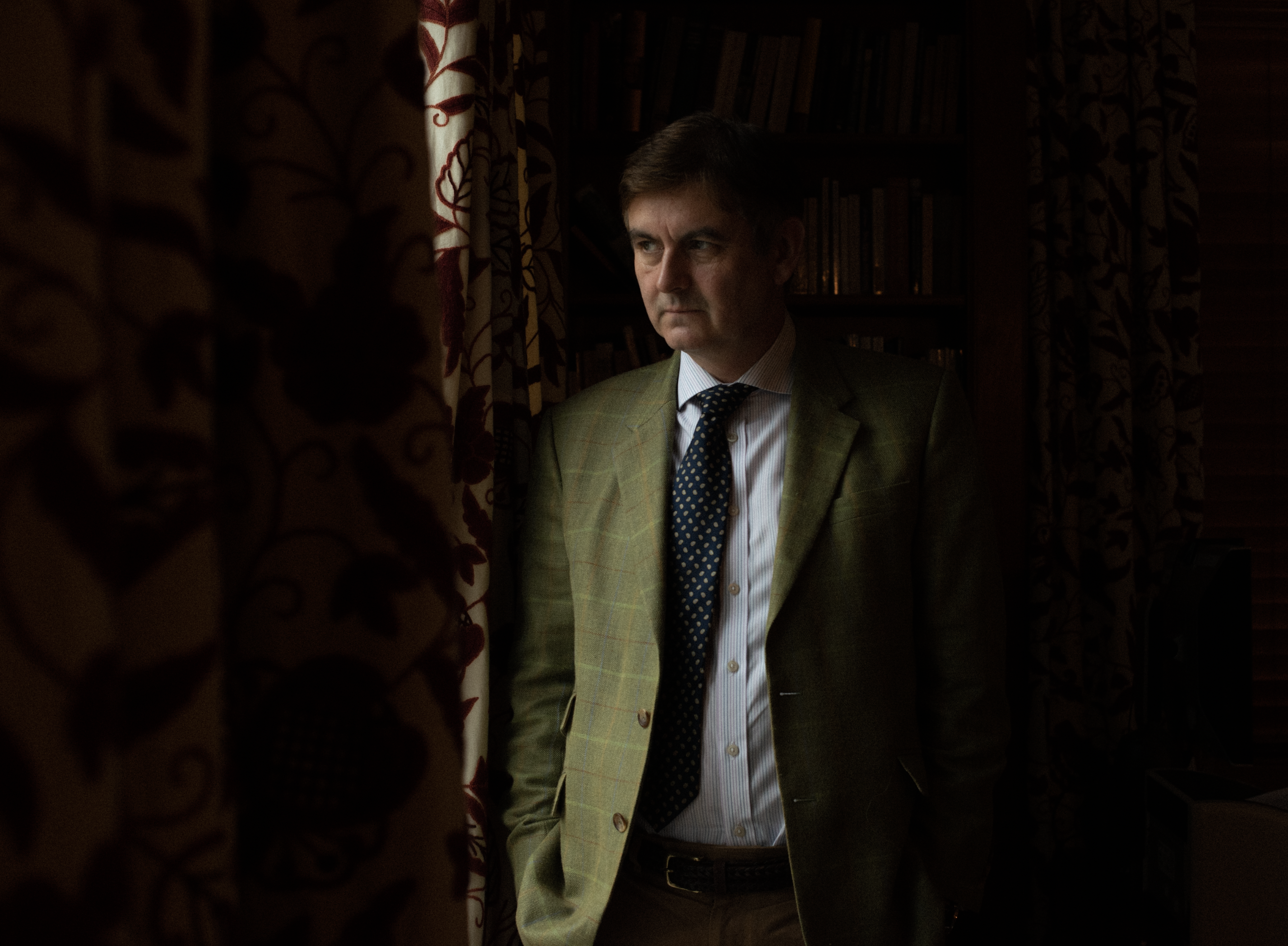
- Born: Andrew Jackson O'Shaughnessy; 1959 (age 66–67); Cheshire, England

Academic background
- Education: Bedford School; Oriel College, Oxford

Andrew Jackson O'Shaughnessy (/oʊˈʃɔːnəsi/; born 1959) is a British academic historian and professor of history at the University of Virginia. Between 2003 and 2022, he was Vice President of the Thomas Jefferson Foundation and the Saunders Director of the Robert H. Smith International Center for Jefferson Studies at Monticello.

== Biography ==
Born in Cheshire in 1959, Andrew O'Shaughnessy was educated at Bedford School. After completing his B.A. and D.Phil at Oriel College, Oxford, he taught at Eton College. He was subsequently appointed as a visiting professor at Southern Methodist University in Dallas and as Professor of American History at the University of Wisconsin Oshkosh, where he was chair of the History Department between 1998 and 2003.

O'Shaughnessy is the author of An Empire Divided: The American Revolution and the British Caribbean (2000) and The Men Who Lost America: British Leadership, the American Revolution and the Fate of the Empire (New Haven: Yale University Press, 2013), which received eight national awards including the New York Historical Society American History Book Prize, the George Washington Book Prize, and the Daughters of the American Revolution Excellence in American History Book Award. It has been translated into Chinese. His most recent book is The Illimitable Freedom of the Human Mind: Thomas Jefferson's Idea of a University (Charlottesville: University of Virginia Press, 2021).

A Fellow of the Royal Historical Society, O'Shaughnessy is co-editor of Old World, New World: America and Europe in the Age of Jefferson (2010), The Founding of Thomas Jefferson's University (2019), The European Friends of the American Revolution (2023) and "Capitalism and Slavery" Revisited. The Impact and Legacy of Eric Williams's Trailblazing Work (2026). He is a general editor of the Jeffersonian American Series, published by the University of Virginia Press.

O'Shaughnessy's father, John O'Shaughnessy, was a Professor at the Columbia University Business School. His brother, Nicholas O'Shaughnessy, is Professor of Communications at Queen Mary College, London University.

He is a joint citizen of the United Kingdom and the United States.

== Awards and honours ==
- 2015 Distinguished Book Award from Society for Military History for The Men Who Lost America
- 2015 The National Society Daughters of the American Revolution Excellence in American History Book Award.
- 2014 New York Historical Society American History Book Prize for The Men Who Lost America
- 2014 George Washington Book Prize for The Men Who Lost America
- 2014 Cincinnati History Prize (sponsored by the Society of the Cincinnati in the State of New Jersey).
- 2014 The American Revolution Round Table of Richmond Book Award
- 2014 Fraunces Tavern Museum Book Award
- 2013 The New York Round Table of the American Revolution Book of the Year.
- 2013 Great Midwest Book Festival Award in Regional Literature
- Finalist, 2014 Cundill Prize in Historical Literature.
- Finalist, 2013 Guggenheim-Lehrman Prize in Military History.
