= Jane Kamensky =

American historian

- Education: Yale University
- Occupation: Historian
- Employer: The Thomas Jefferson Foundation
- Spouse: Dennis J. Scannell Jr.

Jane Kamensky, an American historian, is a professor emerita of history at Harvard University. Since 2024 she has been the president and CEO of the Thomas Jefferson Foundation and of Jefferson's home, Monticello.

Kamensky graduated from Yale University in 1985 with a B.A., and in 1993 with a Ph.D. in history. She was a Radcliffe Institute Fellow in 2006–2007. She was also the Harry S. Truman Professor of American Civilization at Brandeis University, the Jonathan Trumbull Professor of American History at Harvard University and the Carl and Lily Pforzheimer Foundation Director of the Schlesinger Library.

She married Dennis J. Scannell Jr. in 1987; they live in Charlottesville, Virginia.

== Awards and honors ==
- 1987 Mellon Fellow
- 2009 George Washington Book Prize finalist
- 2009 Fellow, Society of American Historians
- 2016 Barbara and David Zalaznick Book Prize in American History for A Revolution in Color: The World of John Singleton Copley
- 2018 Guggenheim Fellow

== Works ==
- A Revolution in Color: The World of John Singleton Copley, W. W. Norton. 2016. ISBN 978-0-393-24001-6.
- "Boom and Bust: It's the American Way". The Los Angeles Times. July 20, 2008.
- The Exchange Artist: A Tale of High-Flying Speculation and America's First Banking Collapse. Viking. 2008. ISBN 978-0-670-01841-3.
- Jane Kamensky; Jill Lepore (2008). Blindspot: by a Gentleman in Exile and a Lady in Disguise. Random House, Inc. ISBN 978-0-385-52619-7.
- Governing the Tongue: The Politics of Speech in Early New England. Oxford University Press. 1999. ISBN 978-0-19-513090-4.
- Jane Kamensky (1998). Nancy F. Cott (ed.). The Colonial Mosaic: American Women 1600-1760. Oxford University Press. ISBN 978-0-19-512400-2.
- Kamensky, Jane (2024-03-12). Candida Royalle and the Sexual Revolution: A History from Below. W. W. Norton. ISBN 978-1-324-00208-6.
