= Alan Taylor (historian) =

American historian (born 1955)

Alan Shaw Taylor
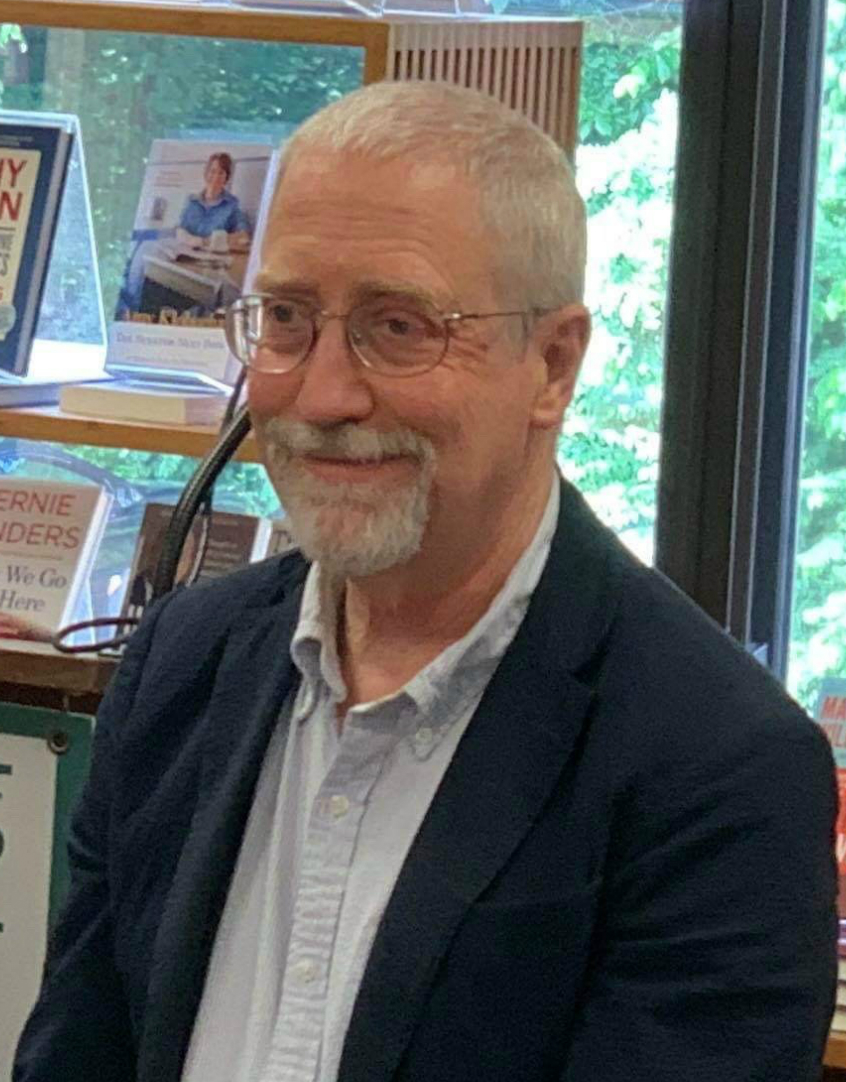
- Taylor in 2019
- Born: June 17, 1955 (age 71); Portland, Maine, U.S.
- Education: Colby College (BA); Brandeis University (PhD)
- Occupation: Historian
- Years active: 1977–present
- Notable work: William Cooper's Town: Power and Persuasion on the Frontier of the Early American Republic, The Internal Enemy: Slavery and War in Virginia, 1772-1832
- Awards: 1996 Bancroft Prize, 1996 Beveridge Award, 1996 Pulitzer Prize, 2014 Pulitzer Prize

Alan Shaw Taylor (born June 17, 1955) is an American historian and scholar who, most recently, was the Thomas Jefferson Memorial Foundation Professor of History at the University of Virginia. A specialist in the early history of the United States, Taylor has written extensively about the colonial history of the United States, the American Revolution, and the early American Republic. Taylor has received two Pulitzer Prizes and the Bancroft Prize, and was also a finalist for the National Book Award for non-fiction.

== Early life and education ==
Taylor was born on June 17, 1955 in Portland, Maine, the son of Ruel Taylor, Jr. and author Virginia C. Taylor. He graduated from Colby College, in Waterville, Maine, in 1977, and earned his PhD from Brandeis University in 1986.

== Career ==
Before going to the University of Virginia, Taylor taught at the University of California, Davis and Boston University.

Taylor is best known for his contributions to microhistory, exemplified in his William Cooper's Town: Power and Persuasion on the Frontier of the Early American Republic (1996). Using court records, land records, letters and diaries, Taylor reconstructed the background of founder William Cooper from Burlington, New Jersey, and the economic, political and social history related to the land speculation, founding and settlement of Cooperstown, New York, after the American Revolutionary War.

Taylor's The Divided Ground: Indians, Settlers, and the Northern Borderland of the American Revolution (2006) explored the history of the borders between Canada and the United States in the aftermath of the American Revolution, as well as Iroquois attempts to keep control of some lands. His book The Civil War of 1812: American Citizens, British Subjects, Irish Rebels, & Indian Allies (2010) also addressed this borderland area and strategies pursued by various groups.

Taylor is one of five authors to have twice been awarded the Pulitzer Prize for History. He won it for William Cooper's Town and The Internal Enemy.

Contributing to the anthology Our American Story (2019), Taylor addressed the possibility of a shared American narrative, and offered a skeptical approach, arguing, "There is no single unifying narrative linking past and present in America. Instead, we have enduring divisions in a nation even larger and more diverse than that of 1787. The best we can do today is to cope with our differences by seeking compromises, just as the Founders had to do, painfully and incompletely in the early Republic."

Taylor has written a series of four books with "plural titles," he writes, so as to "convey a core attempt to see our history as continental, rather than simply the isolate story of one nation". They are American Colonies, American Revolutions, American Republics, and American Civil Wars.

== Awards ==
- 1996 Bancroft Prize for William Cooper's Town: Power and Persuasion on the Frontier of the Early American Republic
- 1996 Beveridge Award for William Cooper's Town: Power and Persuasion on the Frontier of the Early American Republic
- 1996 Pulitzer Prize for William Cooper's Town: Power and Persuasion on the Frontier of the Early American Republic
- 2007 Cox Book Prize for The Divided Ground: Indians, Settlers, and the Northern Borderland of the American Revolution
- 2013 National Book Award for Nonfiction finalist for The Internal Enemy: Slavery and War in Virginia, 1772-1832
- 2014 Pulitzer Prize for The Internal Enemy: Slavery and War in Virginia: 1772-1832
- 2014 Merle Curti Award for The Internal Enemy: Slavery and War in Virginia: 1772-1832
- 2014 George Washington Book Prize finalist for The Internal Enemy: Slavery and War in Virginia: 1772-1832
- 2017 George Washington Book Prize finalist for American Revolutions: A Continental History, 1750–1804
- 2021 New-York Historical Society book prizes, Barbara and David Zalaznick Book Prize in American History, for American Republics: A Continental History of the United States, 1783-1850
- 2026 Vincent J. Dooley Distinguished Teaching Fellow by the Georgia Historical Society

== Works ==
=== Books as author ===
- Liberty Men and Great Proprietors: The Revolutionary Settlement on the Maine Frontier 1760-1820, Chapel Hill: University of North Carolina Press, 1990. ISBN 0807819093 OCLC 20421513
- William Cooper's Town: Power and Persuasion on the Frontier of the Early American Republic, New York: Alfred A. Knopf, 1995. ISBN 0394580540 OCLC 32665643
- American Colonies: The Settling of North America, New York: Viking/Penguin, 2001. ISBN 0670872822 OCLC 45804613
- Writing Early American History, Philadelphia: University of Pennsylvania Press, 2005. ISBN 0812238834 OCLC 57429326
- The Divided Ground: Indians, Settlers, and the Northern Borderland of the American Revolution, New York: Alfred A. Knopf, 2006. ISBN 0679454713 OCLC 58043162
- The Civil War of 1812: American Citizens, British Subjects, Irish Rebels, & Indian Allies, New York: Alfred A. Knopf, 2010. ISBN 1400042658 OCLC 503042145
- Colonial America: A Very Short Introduction, Oxford University Press, USA: 2012. ISBN 9780199766239 OCLC 781680690
- The Internal Enemy: Slavery and War in Virginia, 1772-1832, New York: W. W. Norton & Company, 2013. ISBN 9780393073713 OCLC 840934500
- American Revolutions: A Continental History, 1750–1804, W. W. Norton & Company, 2016. ISBN 0393082814
- Thomas Jefferson's Education, W. W. Norton & Company, 2019. ISBN 0393652424
- American Republics: A Continental History of the United States, 1783–1850, W. W. Norton & Company, 2021. ISBN 9781324005797
- American Civil Wars: A Continental History, 1850–1873, W. W. Norton & Company, 2024. ISBN 9781324035282
- Tower Hill: A Plantation on the Edge of Rebellion, W. W. Norton & Company, 2026. ISBN 9781324117346

=== Books as contributor ===
- "One Nation Divisible," Joshua Claybourn, ed. (2019). Our American Story: The Search for a Shared National Narrative. Potomac Books. ISBN 978-1640121706.
