= Cleopatra: A Life =

2010 biography by Stacy Schiff

- Author: Stacy Schiff
- Language: English
- Subject: Cleopatra, History of ancient Egypt
- Genre: Nonfiction, Biography, History
- Publisher: Little Brown
- Publication date: November 1, 2010
- Publication place: United States
- Media type: Print (hardcover and paperback)
- Pages: 384
- ISBN: 9780316001922
- OCLC: 537308872
- Dewey Decimal: 932/.021092 B
- LC Class: 2010006988
- Preceded by: A Great Improvisation: Franklin, France, and the Birth of America (2005)
- Followed by: The Witches: Salem, 1692 (2015)

Cleopatra: A Life is a book written by biographer Stacy Schiff, first published by Little Brown in 2010.

== Overview ==
Cleopatra: A Life is a biography of Cleopatra, the last queen of Egypt, who ruled from 51 to 30 BC. The book aims to separate fact from fiction and shed light on the woman behind the myths and legends that have surrounded her for centuries.

Schiff draws on historical sources and archaeological evidence to paint a detailed and vivid picture of Cleopatra's life and times. She explores Cleopatra's relationships with Julius Caesar and Mark Antony, as well as her dealings with the Roman Empire and other powerful figures of the era. The book also delves into Cleopatra's education, her role as a mother, and her cultural and religious beliefs.

Throughout the book, Schiff challenges the common misconceptions about Cleopatra as a seductress and manipulator, instead portraying her as a politically astute leader who was deeply invested in the welfare of her people. By the end of the book, readers gain a deeper understanding of Cleopatra's life and legacy, as well as the cultural and political context in which she lived.

== Reception ==
The book was generally well received by critics upon its publication in 2010. It received positive reviews from a number of notable publications, including The New York Times, The Washington Post, and The Boston Globe. Many critics praised Schiff's meticulous research and vivid portrayal of Cleopatra's life and times.

Michael Korda, writing for the Daily Beast, called Cleopatra "a masterpiece." The book also won several awards, including the PEN/Jacqueline Bograd Weld Award for Biography in 2011.

In terms of commercial success, "Cleopatra: A Life" was also a bestseller, spending several months on the New York Times Best Seller list. Overall, the book was both critically acclaimed and commercially successful.

== Planned feature film ==
The book was optioned as a film by Sony Pictures with producers Amy Pascal and Scott Rudin attached as producers and at various stages of development was reported to have cast Angelina Jolie and Gal Gadot in the lead role as Cleopatra. Martin Scorsese's Sikelia Productions is developing a Cleopatra biopic with a screenplay by Eric Roth and Michael Hirst, with Martin Scorsese considering to direct and Eiza Gonzalez being eyed to star as Cleopatra.

== See also ==
- Arsinoe IV of Egypt
- Dynasties of ancient Egypt
- Julius Caesar
- Mark Antony
- Ptolemaic dynasty
- Roman Egypt
