= John O'Shaughnessy (academic) =

British academic and writer (1927–2023)

- Born: 1927; Ashton-under-Lyne, England
- Died: 11 April 2023 (aged 95); The Villages, Florida, U.S.
- Spouse: Marjorie Jackson
- Children: Nicholas O'Shaughnessy; Andrew O'Shaughnessy

John O'Shaughnessy (1927 – 11 April 2023) was a British academic and business writer.

Before entering academia, O'Shaughnessy was a marketing manager and industrial consultant. He taught at the Judge Institute of Management Studies at University of Cambridge and then at Cranfield School of Management. From 1967, he was a lecturer at the Graduate School of Business, Columbia University, New York, where he retired as an emeritus professor of business.

== Early life ==
O'Shaughnessy was born in Ashton-under-Lyne, England in 1927. He served in the education branch of the Royal Air Force in India, Pakistan, Iraq, and Egypt.

He held a number of industrial appointments, including as a team member in the management services unit at British Celanese. After graduating in Economics from the University of Glasgow, he held further positions in British industry, including working for British Celanese in Derby (1951–1954) and then as market research manager and internal sales manager at Tootal Broadhurst Lee Ltd in Manchester (1954–1960).

== Academic career ==
O’Shaughnessy began his teaching career as a lecturer at the Cranfield School of Management (now Cranfield University) from 1962 to 1967. From there, in 1967 he moved on to the Columbia University Graduate School of Business, where he also served on the University Senate and was chairman of the Management division of the school. During his 25-year tenure at Columbia, ending in 1993, he supervised Ph.D. students in his seminar on the Philosophy of Science and taught MBA students on topics ranging from marketing, general management, and business policy. Morris B. Holbrook, one of his colleagues, wrote of O’Shaughnessy that he shared insights with younger members of that faculty “in a spirit of generosity seldom encountered in academia.” Latterly, he was a senior associate at the Judge Institute of Management Studies of the University of Cambridge, and retired as an emeritus professor at Columbia. He also taught as a visiting professor at the New School of Economics in Lisbon, Portugal.

His wide experience in business was to influence his subsequent academic study; he was part of the last generation of business school professors to have worked extensively in industry. One of his important contributions was to base sales territories on workload and system of call cycle planning, and this informed his first book, Work Study Applied to a Sales Force (British Institute of Management 1965). As a consultant he had many clients, including Shell, British Petroleum, Interpublic, IBM, Nestlé, Chester Barrie, Kidder Peabody, Citicorp and the International Labour Office.

O’Shaughnessy's principal contribution lay in three areas. He energized the study of ethno-psychology (folk psychology) and attempted to switch the focus away from rational decision-making to the study of emotion. He regarded the literature on consumer behavior as generally subservient to models derived from microeconomics and believed this to be, if not an irrelevant path, then certainly a subsidiary one. Rationality was often a post-hoc attempt at a logical justification of what had been an emotional event. Decisions were often made emotionally before any subsequent cognitive elaboration. O’Shaughnessy pursued such a perspective in a number of significant books, including Why People Buy (Oxford 1987), The Undermining of Beliefs in the Autonomy and Rationality of Consumers (2007, Routledge), and The Marketing Power of Emotion (Oxford, 2003). The Penguin Dictionary of Marketing (London, 2009) described his book Why People Buy as "the first book in marketing to employ hermeneutics in interpreting what consumers say before, during and after buying."

Secondly, O'Shaughnessy sought to apply his learning in the social sciences and philosophy to the study of consumer behavior. This was explored in such works as Explaining Buyer Behavior: Central Concepts and Philosophy of Science Issues (Oxford 1992), and the 400-page Consumer Behavior: Perspectives, Findings and Explanations (Palgrave Macmillan 2013). His view of much of the research in business schools was that it was self-referential, relying on business scholarship but failing to embrace and integrate other developments in the social sciences which might better illuminate the phenomena under investigation.

Thirdly, O’Shaughnessy was a significant advocate of interpretivist approaches to marketing and consumption phenomena, and highly critical of mechanistic models of how decisions are made. His book Interpretation in Social Life, Social Science and Marketing (Routledge 2009) sought to place the idea of interpretation at the core of consumption and marketing research, while rejecting some of the more voguish theories. His scholarly skepticism always intruded, for example, in his article "Post-modernism and marketing: separating the wheat from the chaff", published in the Journal of Macromarketing in 2001.

Over his long publishing career – fourteen books and numerous journal articles – O'Shaughnessy was the antithesis of the micro-specialist. His was a broad canvas, introducing into academic marketing, often for the first time, concepts and theories from an extensive range of social sciences and philosophy. An abiding theme of his work was his call for methodological pluralism and multiple perspectives. He argued that the social sciences represent different perspectives which provided additional windows onto a problem but they seldom individually offered sufficient explanations. Quoting Abraham Kaplan, he often joked that academics trained in a specific social science tradition were like a small boy given a hammer who finds "that everything he encounters needs pounding." His books have been translated into eight languages (French, Spanish, Portuguese, Polish, German, Dutch, Japanese and Russian). Morris B. Holbrook wrote of his “brilliantly compendious, beautifully integrated books” which, together with his conversation, “burst with intellectual energy, creative impulses, and unbounded curiosity.”

In general, O'Shaughnessy stood against the over-rationalisation of our understanding of decision-making. Emotion, not reason, was what really mattered in choice – when shopping, when voting, and in every other aspect of the way we live. This was a romantic rather than an enlightenment understanding of what makes people tick. A restless rebel against intellectual provincialism of business schools, John O’Shaughnessy's work has emerged as a useful corrective to un-interrogated paradigms, norms and habits within the discipline. He would not, as he was fond of saying, offer the truth, but an approach to tracking the truth through multiple perspectives. He was ultimately a perspectivist, and a persuasive advocate of those perspectives he held dear.

== Personal life ==
John O'Shaughnessy was married for 64 years to Marjorie Jackson (1930–2018) by whom he had two sons, Nicholas and Andrew O'Shaughnessy.

O'Shaughnessy died in The Villages, Florida on 11 April 2023, at the age of 95.

== Publications ==
O'Shaughnessy published fourteen books on business topics, two of which, on organization, going back to 1965, were reissued. He published in many marketing journals, including the Journal of Marketing, Journal of Consumer Research, and Journal of Marketing Science.

Books published by John O’Shaughnessy include:

- Business Organization, Allen and Unwin, U.K. 1966. Humanities Press, New York (translations: French, Spanish, Portuguese, Polish, German).
- Work Study Applied to a Sales Force, British Institute of Management, 1965 (translation: Dutch).
- Analyzing and Controlling Business Procedures, Cassels U.K., 1969 (translation: Japanese).
- Evaluate Your Sales Force, British Institute of Management, 1971.
- Inquiry and Decision, Allen and Unwin U.K. 1972, Barnes and Noble, New York (translation: Polish).
- Patterns of Business Organization, Allen and Unwin, and Halsted Press, Division of John Wiley & Sons, New York 1976. Translation: Russian). Four impressions/reprintings.
- Competitive Marketing: A Strategic Approach, George Allen and Unwin, Boston/London, 1984. English Language Book Society (ELBS) selection, 1986. (translation: Spanish). Third Edition (1995) published by Routledge plus a teacher's manual. Russian translation.
- Why People Buy, Oxford University Press, 1987 (translation: Polish, Spanish).
- Explaining Buyer Behavior: Central Concepts and Philosophy of Science Issues. Oxford University Press, 1992.
- The Marketing Power of Emotion (with N.J. O’Shaughnessy), 2003, Oxford University Press (translation: Chinese edition).
- Persuasion in Advertising (with N.J. O’Shaughnessy), 2004, Routledge (translations: Chinese and Korean editions).
- The Undermining of Beliefs in the Autonomy and Rationality of Consumers with (N.J. O’Shaughnessy), 2007, Routledge.
- Interpretation in Social Life, Social Science and Marketing (2009). London, Routledge.
- Consumer Behavior: Perspectives, Findings & Explanations (2013). Palgrave, Macmillan.
