= Adam Goodheart =

American historian

Adam K. Goodheart is an American historian, essayist, and author. He is known for his book on the social history of the early days of the American Civil War: 1861: The Civil War Awakening, and The Last Island: Discovery, Defiance, and the Most Elusive Tribe on Earth, a work of history as well as travel about North Sentinel Island in the Indian Ocean. In an advance starred review, Kirkus called The Last Island “A thrilling book that will leave you contemplating the concept of civilization.”

Goodheart's essays have appeared in publications such as The Atlantic, The New York Times, and National Geographic. He was one of the founders and senior editors of the magazine of the Library of Congress, Civilization.

Goodheart is the director of the C.V. Starr Center for the Study of the American Experience at Washington College.

Goodheart has a bachelor's degree from Harvard University.

== Books ==
- 1861: The Civil War Awakening. Knopf. 2011.
- The Last Island: Discovery, Defiance, and the Most Elusive Tribe on Earth. Godine. 2023.
