= Saint-Exupéry: A Biography =

1994 biographical nonfiction book

- Author: Stacy Schiff
- Subject: Antoine de Saint-Exupéry
- Genre: Biography
- Publication date: 1994

Saint-Exupéry: A Biography is a 1994 biographical nonfiction book about Antoine de Saint-Exupéry by Stacy Schiff, and a 1995 Pulitzer Prize nominee. The book traces the life of the famed author, from his noble but impoverished origins, his time with Aéropostale, to his writing of the 1943 novel The Little Prince.
