= William Cooper's Town =

1996 American history book by Alan Taylor

William Cooper's Town: Power and Persuasion on the Frontier of the Early American Republic
- Author: Alan Taylor
- Genre: History
- Publisher: Vintage
- Publication date: 1996
- Publication place: United States
- Pages: 576
- Awards: Pulitzer Prize for History
- ISBN: 978-0679773009

William Cooper's Town: Power and Persuasion on the Frontier of the Early American Republic is a history book written by American historian Alan Taylor, published by Vintage in August 1996. It profiles the life of William Cooper, father of novelist James Fenimore Cooper, on the frontier of upstate New York. The book won the 1996 Pulitzer Prize for History.
