= Nicholas O'Shaughnessy =

British academic

Nicholas Jackson O'Shaughnessy is a British academic. He is professor of communications and of post-Cold War German history at Queen Mary, University of London. He is a Fellow of the Royal Society for the encouragement of Arts, Manufactures and Commerce, a Quondam Fellow of Hughes Hall, University of Cambridge and has previously been a professor at Keele University and Brunel University. He is considered an expert on political propaganda, particularly Nazi propaganda.

== Life and education ==
His father is academic John O'Shaughnessy and his brother is historian Andrew O'Shaughnessy. He was educated at Bedford School and Bedford College, University of London. He also holds postgraduate degrees from Cambridge University, Keble College, Oxford (where he was president of the Oxford Union debating society in 1978), and Columbia University in New York.

== Career ==
In the 1983 general election, he stood as the Conservative candidate in Swansea East, coming in third place, behind the Liberals and Labour incumbent Donald Anderson. In 1995 he wrote five reports on political communication, commissioned by the then Prime Minister, John Major.

O'Shaughnessy is the author of a number of books. With his father, John O'Shaughnessy, he has written The Marketing Power of Emotion (Oxford University Press, 2003), about the role of emotion in marketing, and Persuasion In Advertising (Routledge, 2003), about why advertising persuades.

== Books ==
- The Phenomenon of Political Marketing (1990)
- Politics and Propaganda: Weapons of Mass Seduction (2004)
- Selling Hitler: Propaganda and the Nazi Brand (2016)
- The SAGE Handbook of Propaganda (2020) with co-editors Paul Baines and Nancy Snow
