= Richard Beeman =

American historian (1942–2016)

Richard Roy Beeman (May 6, 1942 – September 6, 2016) was an American historian and biographer specializing in the American Revolution.

== Life ==
Beeman was born in Seattle, Washington, United States, on May 6, 1942. He received a bachelor of arts degree in history from the University of California, Berkeley, in 1964, followed by a master of arts degree from the College of William & Mary in 1965. He received a Ph.D in history from the University of Chicago in 1968.

Beeman published multiple books, and was the John Walsh Centennial Professor of History at the University of Pennsylvania. Beeman was the 2003-4 Harold Vyvyan Harmsworth Professor of American History. He also served as the director of the Philadelphia Center for Early American Studies, on the board of trustees of the National Constitution Center, and as the editor of American Quarterly.

Beeman died in his home outside of Philadelphia from complications due to ALS.

== Works ==
=== Books ===
- The Old Dominion and the New Nation, 1788-1801 (1972) (ISBN 9780813112695)
- Patrick Henry: A Biography (1974) (ISBN 978-0070042803)
  - Finalist for the National Book Award for Biography
- Beyond Confederation: Origins of the Constitution and American National Identity (1987) (ISBN 9780807841723)
- The Evolution of the Southern Backcountry: A Case Study of Lunenburg County, Virginia, 1746-1832 (1989) (ISBN 9780812212983)
- The Varieties of Political Experience in Eighteenth-Century America (2004) (ISBN 9780807841723)
- The Penguin Guide to the United States Constitution: A Fully Annotated Declaration of Independence, U. S. Constitution and Amendments, and Selections from the Federalist Papers (2010) (ISBN 9780143118107)
- Plain, Honest Men: The Making of the American Constitution (2009) (ISBN 9780812976847)
  - George Washington Book Prize
  - Literary Award of the Athenaeum of Philadelphia
- Our Lives, Our Fortunes, Our Sacred Honor: Americans Choose Independence (2013) (ISBN 9780465026296)

=== Articles ===
- "Benjamin Franklin and the American Enlightenment", in The Intellectual World of Benjamin Franklin (Dilys P. Winegrad, ed., 1990) (ISBN 0812213262)
- "The Debate Over Ratification in Virginia", Proceedings of the Leon Jaworski Constitutional Institute (American Bar Association, 1993)
- "Deference, Republicanism and the Emergence of Popular Politics in Eighteenth Century America", William and Mary Quarterly, 3rd series (1993) (ISSN 0043-5597; 1933-7698)
- "Republicanism and the First American Party System", in Parties and Politics in American History (L. Sandy Maisel, and William G. Shade, eds., 1994) (ISBN 0815316909)
- "Small Things Remembered: Writing The History of Everyday Life in Early America", American Quarterly, 42 (March 1990) (ISSN 0003-0678)
- "The Colonial Period of American History", in the Encyclopædia Britannica, 15th ed. (ISBN 978-1593398378)
- "The First American Party System", in the Encyclopaedia of Political Parties and Elections in the United States (L. Sandy Maisel, ed., 1991) (ISBN 978-0824079758)
- "Self-Evident Fictions: Divine Right, Popular Sovereignty, and the Myth of the Constituent Power in the Anglo-American World", University of Texas Law Review, 67 (June 1989)
- "The Revolutionary Character of the American Constitution", The Valley Forge Journal, III (1987)
- "The Democratic Faith of Patrick Henry", Virginia Magazine of History and Biography, 95 (1987) (ISSN 0042-6636)
- "Thomas Jefferson and the American Revolution", in Thomas Jefferson: A Reference Biography (Merrill Petersen, ed., 1986) (ISBN 978-0684180694)
- "The Political Response to Social Conflict in the Southern Backcountry: A Comparative View of Virginia and the Carolinas During the Revolution", in An Uncivil War: The Southern Backcountry in the American Revolution (Ronald Hoffman and Thad Tate, eds., 1985) (ISBN 978-0813910512)
- "Cultural Conflict and Social Change in the Revolutionary South: A Case Study of Lunenburg County, Virginia", with Rhys Isaac, Journal of Southern History, XLVI (November 1980) (ISSN 0022-4642)
- "The Social Functions of the Law in Colonial America", Reviews in American History, X (1982)(ISSN 0048-7511)
- "A New Era in Female History", Reviews in American History, IX (September 1981) (ISSN 0048-7511)
- "Robert Munford and the Political Culture of Frontier Virginia", Journal of American Studies, XII (1978) (ISSN 0021-8758)
- "The New Social History and the Search for 'Community' in Early America", American Quarterly, XXIX (1977) (ISSN 0003-0678)
- "Social Change and Cultural Conflict in Virginia: Lunenburg County, 1746-1774", William and Mary Quarterly, 3rd series, XXXV (1978) (ISSN 0043-5597; 1933-7698)
- "The Colonial Frontier", in America's Historylands (Daniel J. Boorstin, ed., 1977) (ISBN 978-0870440038)
- "Trade and Travel in Post-Revolutionary Virginia: A Diary of an Itinerant Peddler", Virginia Magazine of History and Biography, 84 (1976) (ISSN 0042-6636)
- "Labor Forces and Race Relations: A Comparative View of the Colonization of Brazil and Virginia", Political Science Quarterly, LXXVI (1971) (ISSN 0032-3195)
- "Unlimited Debate in the Senate: The First Phase", Political Science Quarterly, LXXXIII (1968) (ISSN 0032-3195)

== Awards ==
- Fulbright Scholar
- Harmsworth Professorship of American History at Oxford University
- National Endowment for the Humanities Senior Fellowship
