= Colin G. Calloway =

American historian (born 1953)

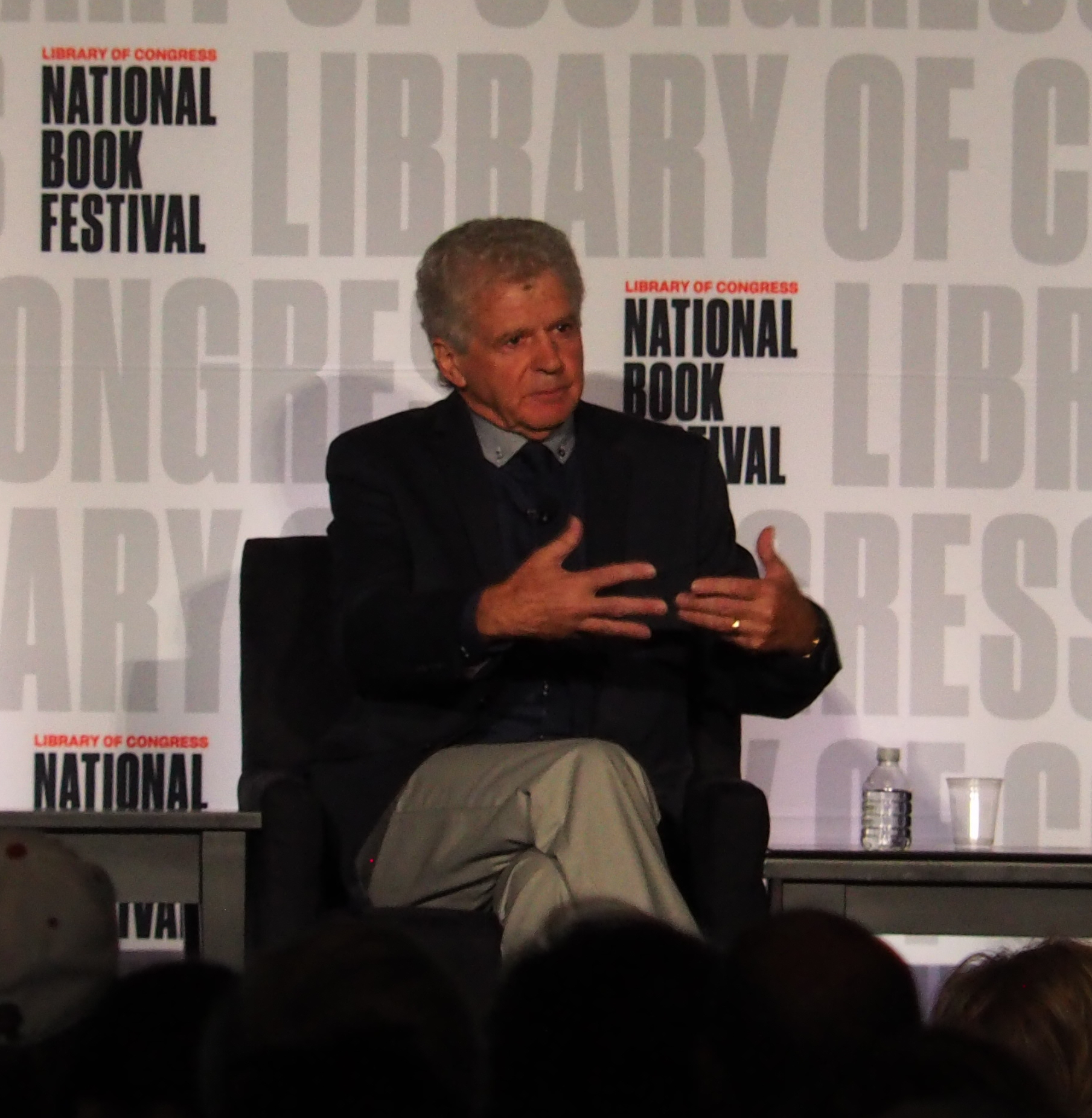
Colin G. Calloway

Colin Gordon Calloway (born 1953) is a British-American historian.

== Biography ==
He earned his PhD from the University of Leeds in 1978.

He first started teaching at Dartmouth College as a visiting faculty member in 1990 and became a full-time faculty member in 1995.

He is the John Kimball Jr. 1943 Professor of History and a professor of Native American Studies at Dartmouth College.

== Awards and honors ==
- 2004 Merle Curti Award
- 2004 Caughey Western History Association Prize
- 2005 Ray Allen Billington Prize
- 2014 Honorary Doctorate from University of Lucerne
- 2018 National Book Award for Nonfiction shortlist for The Indian World of George Washington

== Works ==
- The American Revolution in Indian Country: Crisis and diversity in Native American Communities. Cambridge University Press. 1995. ISBN 0-521-47149-4.
- First Peoples: A Documentary Survey of American Indian History (1999)
- One Vast Winter Count: The Native American West Before Lewis and Clark. University of Nebraska Press. 2003. p. 547. ISBN 978-0-8032-1530-6. "Colin G. Calloway."
- The Scratch of a Pen: 1763 and the Transformation of North America. Oxford University Press. 2006. ISBN 978-0-19-530071-0.
- The Shawnees and the War for America. Viking. 2007. p. 194. ISBN 978-0-670-03862-6. "Colin G. Calloway."
- White People, Indians, and Highlanders: Tribal Peoples and Colonial Encounters in Scotland and America. Oxford University Press. 2008. ISBN 978-0-19-534012-9.
- The Indian History of an American Institution: Native Americans at Dartmouth. University Press of New England. 2010. ISBN 978-1-58465-844-3.
- The Victory With No Name: The Native American Defeat of the First American Army. Oxford University Press. 2015. ISBN 978-0199387991.
- The Indian World of George Washington: The First President, the First Americans, and the Birth of the Nation. Oxford University Press. 2018. ISBN 978-0190652166.
- The Chiefs Now in This City: Indians and the Urban Frontier in Early America. Oxford University Press. 2021. ISBN 978-0197547656.

=== Editor ===
- Colin Gordon Calloway, ed. (1997). "Surviving the Dark Ages". After King Philip's War: presence and persistence in Indian New England. UPNE. ISBN 978-0-87451-819-1.
- Colin Gordon Calloway; Neal Salisbury, eds. (2003). Reinterpreting New England Indians and the Colonial Experience. Colonial Society of Massachusetts. ISBN 978-0-9620737-6-2.

=== Anthologies ===
- Francis G. Couvares; Martha Saxton, eds. (2000). "American Indian: Resistance or Accommodation". Interpretations of American History: Through Reconstruction. Simon and Schuster. ISBN 978-0-684-86773-1.
