= Nick Bunker =

British author, historian and former journalist (born 1958)

- Born: November 25, 1958 (age 67); London, England
- Education: Watford Boys Grammar School
- Alma mater: King's College, Cambridge; Columbia University
- Spouse: Susan Temple (m. 1986)

Nick Bunker (born November 25, 1958) is a British author, historian and a former journalist with the Financial Times.

== Biography ==
A Londoner by birth, Bunker attended Watford Boys Grammar School in Hertfordshire, England. Bunker attended King's College, Cambridge, where he graduated with a double first in English literature in 1981. In 1983 Bunker completed a master's degree at Columbia University Graduate School of Journalism.

== Career ==
Bunker became a news reporter for the Liverpool Echo . Bunker then spent six years as a Financial Times journalist. He switched careers in the 1990s to work in investment analysis and corporate finance.

Bunker's first book, Making Haste From Babylon: The Mayflower Pilgrims and their World (2010) was long-listed for the Samuel Johnson Prize for Non-Fiction (now the Baillie Gifford Prize). This was followed in 2014 by An Empire on the Edge, which explored the immediate origins of the Revolutionary War centring on the Boston Tea Party and placing it in its global context in the China tea trade and the near collapse of the British East India Company in 1772. Besides winning the George Washington Prize and being a Pulitzer finalist, An Empire on the Edge also won the 2015 Fraunces Tavern Museum Book Award for the best recently released book about the period. Researched in London, Boston, Philadelphia and elsewhere Bunker's third book, Young Benjamin Franklin: The Birth of Ingenuity (2018) dealt with the first four decades of Franklin’s life and his emergence as a scientist with his electrical experiments in the 1740s. On January 17, 2019 Bunker gave the annual Benjamin Franklin Birthday Lecture at the American Philosophical Society in Philadelphia, with the title How Did Benjamin Franklin Become a Physicist?

Bunker was the senior historical adviser for Pilgrims, a two-hour PBS American Experience film directed by Ric Burns, which first aired in the US at Thanksgiving 2015 and in the UK as The Mayflower Pilgrims: Behind the Myth in 2016.

== Bibliography ==
- Making Haste From Babylon: The Mayflower Pilgrims and Their World. New York: Alfred A. Knopf (2010) ISBN 978-0-307-26682-8, and London: The Bodley Head (2010), ISBN 978-0-224-081382
- An Empire on the Edge: How Britain Came to Fight America. New York: Alfred A. Knopf (2014), ISBN 978-0-307-59484-6. London: The Bodley Head (2015), ISBN 978-1-847-921543
- Young Benjamin Franklin: The Birth of Ingenuity. New York: Alfred A. Knopf (2018), ISBN 978-1-101-874417
- In the Shadow of Fear: America and the World in 1950. New York: Basic Books (2023), ISBN 978-1-541-675544
