= Michael R. Meyer =

American journalist and writer

Michael Meyer
- Born: Michael Ryder Meyer
- Occupation: Media

Michael Ryder Meyer is the former Dean of the Graduate School of Media and Communications at Aga Khan University's Nairobi, Kenya campus. He was previously the chief speechwriter for the Secretary General of the United Nations, Ban Ki-Moon.

Before his post at the United Nations, Meyer was at Newsweek Magazine for two decades. From 2001 to 2007 he was Europe Editor for Newsweek International, where he also oversaw the magazine's coverage of the Middle East and Asia.

He wrote The Year That Changed The World: The Untold Story of The Fall of The Berlin Wall. His previous book, The Alexander Complex was published by Times Books.

He has written for The New York Times.

== Biography ==
=== Early life and education ===
He holds a B.A. from Hamilton College and received graduate degrees from Columbia University School of Journalism and the Fletcher School of Law and Diplomacy.

=== Career ===
Meyer worked at The Washington Post and Congressional Quarterly before joining Newsweek in 1988.

Between 1988 and 1992, Meyer was Newsweek's bureau chief for Germany, Central Europe and the Balkans, writing more than 20 cover stories on the break-up of communist Europe and German unification. During this period, he witnessed firsthand many of the key events of 1989 and the fall of communism, including the fall of the Berlin Wall, and the revolutions of Czechoslovakia, Hungary, and Poland. He was the last western journalist to interview the Romanian dictator, Nicolae Ceauşescu, just before he was shot. He went on to cover the collapse of the Soviet Union, from Moscow to the Baltics. Beginning in the early 1990s, he traveled widely throughout the Balkans, writing of the coming war in Europe and covering the disintegration of Yugoslavia. Meyer is the winner of two Overseas Press Club Awards.

From 1993 through 1999, Meyer was the general editor for business and technology at Newsweek, covering the Internet revolution and receiving several prizes including the 1995 Computer Press Award. He was Newsweek's Los Angeles bureau chief from 1992 to 1993, the second-largest of Newsweek's bureaus, where he wrote and reported stories from the politics of immigration to Hollywood's studio wars to the Los Angeles riots, for which he shared in a 1993 National Magazine Award for General Excellence.

From 1999 to 2001, Meyer took a sabbatical from Newsweek to work on a diplomatic posting with the United Nations mission in Kosovo, where he was a senior staff officer for the Organization for Security and Co-operation in Europe with principal responsibility for nation-building and civil society. He was hired to start the first news agency in that region and was founding director of KosovaLive. He returned to Newsweek in 2001 as Europe Editor for Newsweek International, where he also oversaw the magazine's coverage of the Middle East and Asia.

== Works ==
- "A Break in the Fence". Newsweek. May 4, 2009.
- "The Wink That Changed the World This is the way the Warsaw Pact folded, not with a bang but a gesture." slate, July 6, 2009
- "Scaling the Berlin Wall", The Daily Beast, October 31, 2009

=== Books ===
- The Year that Changed the World: The Untold Story Behind the Fall of the Berlin Wall. Simon and Schuster. 2009. ISBN 978-1-4165-5845-3.
- The Alexander Complex. Times Books. 1989. ISBN 978-0-8129-1662-1.
