= The Internal Enemy =

2013 American history book by Alan Taylor

The Internal Enemy: Slavery and War in Virginia, 1772–1832
- Author: Alan Taylor
- Published: 2013 (W. W. Norton & Company)
- Publication place: United States
- ISBN: 9780393073713
- OCLC: 840934500

The Internal Enemy: Slavery and War in Virginia, 1772–1832 is a Pulitzer Prize-winning non-fiction book about the history of slavery in Virginia, with an emphasis on the War of 1812. It was written by historian Alan Taylor and published by W. W. Norton & Company in 2013.

== Reception ==
The Internal Enemy was a finalist for the 2013 National Book Award for Nonfiction and won the 2014 Pulitzer Prize for History.
