= Mary Sarah Bilder =

American historian

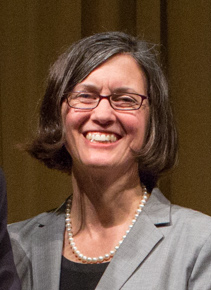
- Bilder in 2016
- Born: October 11, 1965 (age 61)
- Awards: Bancroft Prize

Academic background
- Education: University of Wisconsin–Madison, Harvard Law School, Harvard University

Academic work
- Discipline: Historian
- Sub-discipline: History of American Law
- Institutions: Columbia Law School, Harvard Law School, Boston College Law School

Mary Sarah Bilder (born October 11, 1965) is an American historian of constitutional law, and a winner of the 2016 Bancroft Prize.

== Life ==
She graduated from the University of Wisconsin–Madison, Harvard Law School, and Harvard University. She taught at Columbia Law School and Harvard Law School, and teaches at Boston College Law School.

== Works ==
- The Transatlantic Constitution: Colonial Legal Culture and the Empire. Harvard University Press. 2004. ISBN 978-0-674-01512-8.
- Madison's Hand: Revising the Constitutional Convention. Harvard University Press. 2015. ISBN 978-0-674-49550-0.
- Female Genius: Eliza Harriot and George Washington at the Dawn of the Constitution. University of Virginia Press, 2022. ISBN 978-0-813-94719-8

== Honors ==
- 2016 – Bancroft Prize for Madison's Hand: Revising the Constitutional Convention
