= American Revolutions (book) =

2016 American history book by Alan Taylor

- Author: Alan Taylor
- Publisher: W. W. Norton & Company
- Publication date: 2016
- Pages: 704
- ISBN: 978-0-393-08281-4
- OCLC: 937452505

American Revolutions: A Continental History, 1750–1804 is a 2016 history book by Alan Taylor.

== Bibliography ==
- Bothwell, Robert (2018). "Review of The Divided Ground: Indians, Settlers, and the Northern Borderland of the American Revolution, TaylorAlan; The Civil War of 1812: American Citizens, British Subjects, Irish Rebels, & Indian Allies, TaylorAlan; The Internal Enemy: Slavery and War in Virginia, 1772–1832, TaylorAlan; American Revolutions: A Continental History, 1750–1804, TaylorAlan". International Journal. 73 (1): 166–168. ISSN 0020-7020. JSTOR 26499670.
- Countryman, Edward (2018). "Review of American Revolutions: A Continental History, 1750–1804". The American Historical Review. 123 (1): 215–216. ISSN 0002-8762. JSTOR 26580869.
- Hsiung, David C. (2018). "Review". Pennsylvania History: A Journal of Mid-Atlantic Studies. 85 (3): 429–432. doi:10.5325/pennhistory.85.3.0429. ISSN 0031-4528. JSTOR 10.5325/pennhistory.85.3.0429.
- Johnson, Ronald Angelo (2018). "Not Your Fathers' Revolution: Internationalizing American Independence". Reviews in American History. 46 (1): 14–20. ISSN 0048-7511. JSTOR 48558671.
- Kloppenberg, James T. (2017). "Review of American Revolutions: A Continental History, 1750–1804". The Journal of American History. 104 (3): 756. ISSN 0021-8723. JSTOR 48548985.
- Orr, Ittai (2017). "The Room Where It Happened: Race and the American Revolution". American Quarterly. 69 (4): 903–915. ISSN 0003-0678. JSTOR 26794704.
- Parkinson, Robert G. (2019). "Janus's Revolution". The William and Mary Quarterly. 76 (3): 545–561. doi:10.5309/willmaryquar.76.3.0545. ISSN 0043-5597. JSTOR 10.5309/willmaryquar.76.3.0545.
- Pearl, Christopher R. (2018). "Review of American Revolutions: A Continental History". The Register of the Kentucky Historical Society. 116 (3/4): 519–521. ISSN 0023-0243. JSTOR 45013593.
- Shankman, Andrew; Waldstreicher, David, eds. (2019). "Introduction: Continental History and the American Revolution in DuVal and Taylor". Journal of the Early Republic. 39 (3): 537–538. ISSN 0275-1275. JSTOR 26905472.
- Smith, Jordan Michael (2016). "The Dark Side of the Revolution". The National Interest (145): 91–95. ISSN 0884-9382. JSTOR 26557341.
