= The Hemingses of Monticello =

2008 book by Annette Gordon-Reed

The Hemingses of Monticello: An American Family
- Author: Annette Gordon-Reed
- Language: English
- Genre: History, biography
- Publisher: W. W. Norton
- Publication date: 2008
- Publication place: United States
- Pages: 800
- ISBN: 0-393-06477-8
- OCLC: 225087744

The Hemingses of Monticello: An American Family is a 2008 book by American historian Annette Gordon-Reed. It recounts the history of four generations of the African-American Hemings family, from their African and Virginia origins until the 1826 death of Thomas Jefferson, their master and the father of Sally Hemings' children.

It is based on Gordon-Reed's study of legal records, diaries, farm books, letters, wills, newspapers, archives, and oral history. Gordon-Reed wanted readers to "see slave people as individuals" and to "tell the story of this family in a way not done before". Jefferson scholar Joseph Ellis has called the book "the best study of a slave family ever written".

The book has won sixteen awards and was a finalist for the 2008 National Book Critics Circle Award in Biography and the 2009 Mark Lynton History Prize.

== In 2008 ==
- National Book Award for Nonfiction, and
- Society for Historians of the Early American Republic Book Award

== In 2009 ==
- Pulitzer Prize in History (Gordon-Reed was the first African American to be awarded this prize)
- George Washington Book Prize,
- Anisfield-Wolf Book Award,
- New Jersey Council of the Humanities Book Award,
- Frederick Douglass Prize,
- Owsley Award from the Southern Historical Association, and
- Library of Virginia Literary Award

== In 2010 ==
In 2010 Annette Gordon-Reed was awarded a MacArthur Fellowship for her works on colonial and early American history, race and slavery. The Foundation noted that her "persistent investigation into the life of an iconic American president has dramatically changed the course of Jeffersonian scholarship."
