= Stacy Schiff =

American biographer, editor, essayist (born 1961)

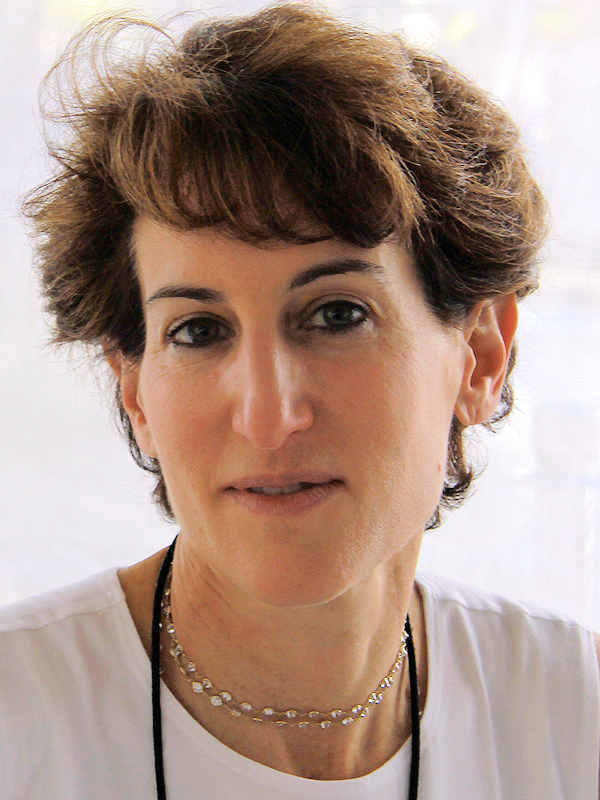
- Schiff in 2016
- Born: Stacy Madeleine Schiff; October 26, 1961 (age 64); Adams, Massachusetts
- Education: Phillips Academy
- Alma mater: Williams College (BA)
- Occupations: Writer and editor
- Spouse: Marc de La Bruyere (m. 1989)
- Children: 3
- Writing career
- Genres: Biography, essay, non-fiction
- Notable awards: Pulitzer Prize
- Website: stacyschiff.com

Stacy Madeleine Schiff (born October 26, 1961) is an American writer. Her biography of Véra Nabokov won the 2000 Pulitzer Prize in biography. Schiff has also written biographies of French aviator and author of The Little Prince, Antoine de Saint-Exupéry, colonial American-era polymath and prime mover of America's founding, Benjamin Franklin, Franklin's fellow Founding Father Samuel Adams, ancient Egyptian queen Cleopatra, and the important figures and events of the Salem Witch Trials of 1692–93 in colonial Massachusetts.

== Early life ==
Schiff was born in Adams, Massachusetts, to Morton Schiff, the president of Schiff Clothing, a store founded by Schiff's great-grandfather in 1897, and Ellen, a professor of French literature at North Adams State college (now called Massachusetts College of Liberal Arts). Her family was Jewish. Schiff described herself as "an obstreperous child".

Schiff graduated from Phillips Academy (Andover) preparatory school, and subsequently earned her B.A. degree from Williams College in 1982.

== Career ==
Until 1990, Schiff was a senior editor at Simon & Schuster. In 2000, she won the Pulitzer Prize for Biography or Autobiography for Véra, a biography of Véra Nabokov, the wife and muse of the Russian-American novelist Vladimir Nabokov. She had earlier been a finalist for the 1995 Pulitzer Prize for Biography or Autobiography for Saint-Exupéry: A Biography of Antoine de Saint-Exupéry.

Schiff's A Great Improvisation: Franklin, France, and the Birth of America (2005) won the George Washington Book Prize. It was made into Franklin, a 2024 miniseries starring Michael Douglas.

Her fourth book, Cleopatra: A Life, was published in 2010. As The Wall Street Journal's reviewer put it, "Schiff does a rare thing: She gives us a book we'd miss if it didn't exist." The New Yorker termed the book "a work of literature"; Simon Winchester predicted "it will become a classic". Cleopatra appeared on The New York Times's Top Ten Books of 2010, and won the 2011 PEN/Jacqueline Bograd Weld Award for Biography. A film adaptation directed by Denis Villeneuve was announced to be in development in 2024 for Sony and is intended to be Villeneuve's next project aftter the completion of Dune: Part Three.

Schiff's The Witches: Salem, 1692 was published in 2015. The New York Times described it as "an almost novelistic, thriller-like narrative". David McCullough declared the book "brilliant from start to finish". Writing in the New York Times Book Review, Jane Kamensky said the book was "curiously flat" and provided a “tenuous grip on the period,” concluding: “For all her talents in sketching the who, what, where and when of the Salem trials, [the] vexed question of why is one that Schiff simply cannot manage.” Writing in The Wall Street Journal, Felipe Fernández-Armesto found that Schiff offered "a trial narrative unsurpassed for detail and impressive for her mastery of the fragmentary and frustrating sources," but said that she "uncovers no new clues to understanding" how the sides in the trials aligned.

Schiff's essays and articles have appeared in The New Yorker, The New York Times, The New York Review of Books, The Times Literary Supplement, and The Washington Post. A former guest columnist at The New York Times, Schiff resides in New York City and is a trustee of the John Simon Guggenheim Memorial Foundation. Since 2023, Schiff has been on the board of Phillips Academy.

=== Awards and honors ===
- National Endowment for the Humanities, fellowship
- 1995 Pulitzer Prize finalist, Saint-Exupéry: A Biography
- 1996 John Simon Guggenheim Memorial Foundation, fellowship
- 2000 Pulitzer Prize, Véra (Mrs. Vladimir Nabokov)
- 2002 Dorothy and Lewis B. Cullman Center Fellowship, New York Public Library
- 2006 George Washington Book Prize, A Great Improvisation
- 2011 Library Lion, New York Public Library
- 2015 Lapham's Quarterly Janus Prize
- 2016 Literary Light, Boston Public Library
- 2017 New England Historic Genealogical Society Lifetime Achievement Award in History and Biography
- 2018 French Ministry of Culture, Chevalier des Arts et Lettres (Knight)
- 2019 Peggy V. Helmerich Distinguished Author Award
- 2019 American Academy of Arts and Letters
- 2023 finalist, George Washington Book Prize, The Revolutionary: Samuel Adams
- 2024 Colonial Dames of America Book Prize, The Revolutionary: Samuel Adams
- 2024 William Hickling Prescott Award for Excellence in Historical Writing, Massachusetts Historical Society
- 2024 Writer in Residence, American Library in Paris

=== Books ===
- Saint-Exupéry: A Biography. New York: A. A. Knopf. 1994. ISBN 0-679-40310-8.; nominated for the 1995 Pulitzer Prize
- Véra (Mrs. Vladimir Nabokov). Pan Books. 1999. ISBN 0-330-37674-8.; winner of 2000 Pulitzer Prize
- A Great Improvisation: Franklin, France, and the Birth of America. New York: Henry Holt. 2005. ISBN 0-8050-6633-0.; published in the UK as Dr Franklin Goes to France
- Cleopatra: A Life. Little, Brown and Company. 2010. ISBN 978-0-316-00192-2.
- The Witches: Salem, 1692. Little, Brown and Company. 2015. ISBN 978-0-316-20061-5.
- The Revolutionary: Samuel Adams. Little, Brown and Company. 2022. ISBN 9780316441117.

=== Columns and reviews ===
- "Know It All". The New Yorker. July 24, 2006.

== Personal life ==
In 1989, Schiff married Marc de la Bruyère, a French and Canadian real estate developer. They have three children.
