= Annette Gordon-Reed =

American historian (born 1958)

- Gordon-Reed in 2026
- Born: Annette Gordon; November 19, 1958 (age 67); Livingston, Texas, U.S.
- Education: Dartmouth College (BA); Harvard University (JD)
- Occupations: Professor, author, historian
- Employer(s): Harvard Law School; Harvard University; Radcliffe Institute for Advanced Study
- Known for: American Legal History, American Slavery and the Law
- Spouse: Robert Reed
- Children: 2
- Awards: National Book Award for Nonfiction, MacArthur Fellowship, Pulitzer Prize for History

Annette Gordon-Reed (born November 19, 1958) is an American historian and law professor. She is currently the Carl M. Loeb University Professor at Harvard University and a professor of history in the university's Faculty of Arts & Sciences. She is formerly the Charles Warren Professor of American Legal History at Harvard University and the Carol K. Pforzheimer Professor at the Radcliffe Institute for Advanced Study. Gordon-Reed is noted for changing scholarship on Thomas Jefferson regarding his relationship with Sally Hemings and her children.

She was awarded the Pulitzer Prize for History, the National Book Award for Nonfiction, and 15 other prizes in 2008–2009 for The Hemingses of Monticello. In 2010, she received the National Humanities Medal and a MacArthur Fellowship. Since 2018, she has served as a trustee of the National Humanities Center in Research Triangle Park, NC. She was elected a Member of the American Philosophical Society in 2019. She is a Trustee of the Gilder Lehrman Institute of American History.

== Background and education ==
Gordon-Reed was born in Livingston, Texas, to Bettye Jean Gordon and Alfred Gordon. She grew up in Jim Crow Conroe, Texas, and was the first Black child in her elementary school. In third grade she became interested in Thomas Jefferson. She graduated from Dartmouth College in 1981 and Harvard Law School in 1984, where she was the first African-American editor of the Harvard Law Review.

== Marriage and family ==
Gordon-Reed is married to Robert R. Reed, a justice of the Supreme Court of the State of New York, whom she met while at Harvard Law School. She lives on the Upper West Side of New York with her husband and two children, Gordon and Susan.

== Professional and academic career ==
Gordon-Reed spent her early career as an associate at Cahill Gordon & Reindel, and as counsel to the New York City Board of Corrections. She speaks or moderates at numerous conferences across the country on history and law-related topics. She was previously Wallace Stevens Professor of Law at New York Law School (1992–2010) and Board of Governors Professor of History at Rutgers University, Newark (2007–2010).

In 2010, she joined Harvard University with joint appointments in history and law, and as Carol K. Pforzheimer Professor at the Radcliffe Institute for Advanced Study. In 2012, she was appointed the Charles Warren Professor of American Legal History at HLS. In 2014, she was the Harold Vyvyan Harmsworth Visiting professor at Queen's College, University of Oxford.

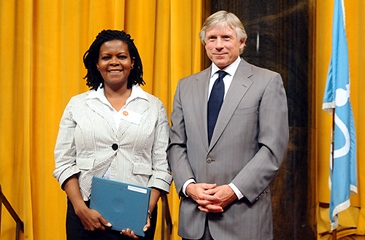
Lee C. Bollinger, President of Columbia University, presents the 2009 Pulitzer Prize for History to Annette Gordon-Reed

=== Thomas Jefferson and Sally Hemings: An American Controversy (1997) ===
Her first book, Thomas Jefferson and Sally Hemings: An American Controversy, sparked considerable interest from fellow scholars, as it investigated and analyzed the long-standing historical controversy of whether Thomas Jefferson had a sexual relationship with his slave Sally Hemings and fathered children by her. Most academic historians had accepted the denials of Jefferson descendants and their assertion that the late Peter Carr (a married nephew of Jefferson) was the father. Biographer James Parton adopted this alternative account to rumors about Jefferson's paternity, as did succeeding historians for more than 100 years.

As some historians began to reinvestigate Jefferson in the late twentieth century, his defenders responded as if assertions of his paternity were intended to damage his historical reputation, despite the widespread acknowledgement by then of the numerous interracial liaisons in Jefferson's time. In 1974, Fawn M. Brodie wrote the first biography of Jefferson to seriously examine the evidence related to Sally Hemings; she thought the Hemings-Jefferson liaison was likely.

Gordon-Reed analyzed the historiography and identified the set of unexamined assumptions that had governed the investigations by many Jefferson scholars. These assumptions were that white people tell the truth, Black people lie, slave owners tell the truth, and slaves lie. Gordon-Reed cross-checked the versions of events provided by former Monticello slaves, such as Madison Hemings, who claimed Jefferson as his father, and Isaac Jefferson, who confirmed Thomas Jefferson's paternity of the Hemings children, against documented historical evidence to which they could not have had access. She similarly cross-checked oral traditions among Hemings' descendants against such primary sources as Jefferson's papers and agricultural records. She demonstrated errors made by historians, and noted facts overlooked by the white Jefferson descendants and historians, which contradicted their assertions that one or more of Jefferson's Carr nephews had fathered the children.

As the historian Winthrop Jordan had noted, which was also noted by Brodie, historian Dumas Malone's extensive documentation of Jefferson's travels showed that Jefferson was at Monticello during the period of time when Hemings conceived each of her known children, and that she never conceived when he was not there. Gordon-Reed noted that all of Sally Hemings' children were freed. They were the only slave family to gain such freedom, which was consistent with what Madison said Jefferson had promised to his mother, Sally Hemings. Gordon-Reed concluded that Jefferson and Hemings did have a sexual relationship, though she did not try to characterize it. Reprinted in 1999, her new edition of the book has a foreword incorporating the 1998 DNA study.

External videos
- Booknotes interview with Gordon-Reed on Thomas Jefferson and Sally Hemings, February 21, 1999, C-SPAN

==== Reception ====
Gordon-Reed "drew on her legal training to apply context and reasonable interpretation to the sparse documentation" and analyzed the historiography as well. The writer Christopher Hitchens in Slate described her analysis as "brilliant."

Critics such as John Works and Robert F. Turner of the Thomas Jefferson Heritage Society have pointed out several transcription errors in Gordon-Reed's first book. Although Gordon-Reed said the errors were a "mistake," Works and Turner have alleged them to be alterations of historical documents.

Gordon-Reed's study stimulated a revival of interest in this topic. In 1998 a Y-DNA study was conducted of direct male descendants of the Jefferson male line, Eston Hemings line, and Carrs, as this DNA is passed down virtually unchanged. There was a Y-DNA match between the Jefferson male line and a male descendant of Eston Hemings, but no such match for the Carrs. Researchers noted that, when added to the body of historical evidence, this strongly suggested Thomas Jefferson was the father of the children.

=== Vernon Can Read! (2001) ===
This memoir of Vernon Jordan, the civil rights activist, written with him, portrayed his life from childhood through the 1980s. It won the Best Nonfiction Book for 2001 from the Black Caucus of the American Library Association. In 2002 it won an Anisfield-Wolf Book Award and a Trailblazer Award from the Metropolitan Black Bar Association.

=== The Hemingses of Monticello: An American Family (2008) ===
In 2008 Gordon-Reed published The Hemingses of Monticello, the first volume of a planned two-volume history on the Hemings family and their descendants, bringing a slave family to life on their own terms. She traced the many descendants of Elizabeth Hemings and their families during the time that they lived at Monticello; she had 75 descendants there. It was widely praised for its groundbreaking treatment of an extended slave family. It won the Pulitzer Prize for History and 15 additional awards.

=== Andrew Johnson (2011) ===
In 2011, Gordon-Reed published a biography of the US post-Civil War president Andrew Johnson and his historical reputation. She notes that he did not favor integration of freedmen into America's mainstream and caused the delay of their full emancipation. Although he was long considered a hero, his reputation became tainted after 1900, as white historians researched his actions or lack thereof regarding integration of African Americans. Gordon-Reed has noted that the abolitionist Frederick Douglass realized Johnson was no friend of African Americans.

Gordon-Reed argues in the book that much of the misery imposed on African Americans could have been avoided if they had been given portions of land to cultivate as their own. Without land, African Americans in the Deep South generally earned livings as sharecroppers, primarily (if not totally) under white land-owners. They had few economic resources or choices and, often illiterate, were forced to accept the owner's reckoning of accounts at the end of the year. They often had to buy supplies at his store, which became part of the reckoning. She likens their situation to that of immigrant workers in the New York garment industry (sweat shops) in the 1890s, and coal miners, who were captives of mining company stores until the UMWA was founded in 1890.

=== Awards and recognition ===
Gordon-Reed was the first African American to win the Pulitzer Prize for History, for her 2008 work on the Hemings family, The Hemingses of Monticello. She won 15 additional awards for the book.

2008

- National Book Award for Nonfiction,
- Society for Historians of the Early American Republic Book Award

2009

- Pulitzer Prize in History,
- George Washington Book Prize,
- Anisfield-Wolf Book Award,
- New Jersey Council of the Humanities Book Award,
- Frederick Douglass Prize,
- Owsley Award from the Southern Historical Association, and
- Library of Virginia Literary Award.

2010

- On February 25, 2010, President Barack Obama honored Annette Gordon-Reed with the National Humanities Medal, the highest national honor for the arts and humanities.
- On September 28, 2010, Gordon-Reed was awarded a MacArthur Fellowship. The Foundation noted that her "persistent investigation into the life of an iconic American president has dramatically changed the course of Jeffersonian scholarship."

Gordon-Reed has also received a Guggenheim Fellowship for Monticello Legacies in the New Age, 2009; and a Cullman Center Fellowship from the New York Public Library for 2010–2011 to work on Monticello Legacies. She was Columbia University's Barbara A. Black Lecturer, 2001; and won a Bridging the Gap Award for fostering racial reconciliation, 2000. She holds honorary degrees, from Ramapo College in New Jersey and the College of William and Mary in May 2010.

On March 7, 2009, she was interviewed on the WBGO program Conversations with Allan Wolper. She discussed the intimate relationship between Thomas Jefferson and Sally Hemings, as well as issues that American Black women face today.

2020

- On July 28, 2020, she was named a university professor, Harvard University's highest faculty honor. Claudine Gay, the Edgerley Family Dean of the Faculty of Arts and Sciences and the Wilbur A. Cowett Professor of Government and of African and African-American Studies, said, "This is a wonderful recognition of Annette's seminal contributions to our understanding of American history, including our most harrowing tragedies and painful contradictions. She reminds us of the transformative power of academic discovery. I am thrilled by this appointment."

2021

- On July 23, 2021, she was elected a corresponding fellow of the British Academy.

2022

- In 2022, she was named a Vincent J. Dooley Distinguished Teaching Fellow by the Georgia Historical Society. The honor recognizes national leaders in the field of history as both writers and educators whose research has enhanced or changed the way the public understands the past.

== Bibliography (books only) ==
- 1997 – Thomas Jefferson and Sally Hemings: An American Controversy (University of Virginia Press)
  - 1998 – reprint with new foreword discussing DNA evidence
- 2001 – Vernon Can Read!: A Memoir (with Vernon Jordan) (PublicAffairs)
- 2002 – Race on Trial: Law and Justice in American History (Oxford University Press)
- 2008 – The Hemingses of Monticello: An American Family (W. W. Norton & Company)
- 2011 – Andrew Johnson: The American Presidents Series—The 17th President, 1865–1869 (Times Books/Henry Holt)
- 2016 – Most Blessed of the Patriarchs: Thomas Jefferson and the Empire of the Imagination (Liveright)
- 2021 – On Juneteenth (Liveright)
