= The Revolutionary: Samuel Adams =

2022 book by Stacy Schiff

- First edition
- Author: Stacy Schiff
- Subject: Biography
- Publisher: Little, Brown & Co.
- Publication date: October 25, 2022
- Pages: 432
- ISBN: 9780316441117

The Revolutionary: Samuel Adams is a 2022 biography of Founding Father and American Revolution activist, politician, and patriot Samuel Adams, written by Stacy Schiff.
