= Peter Cozzens =

American historian

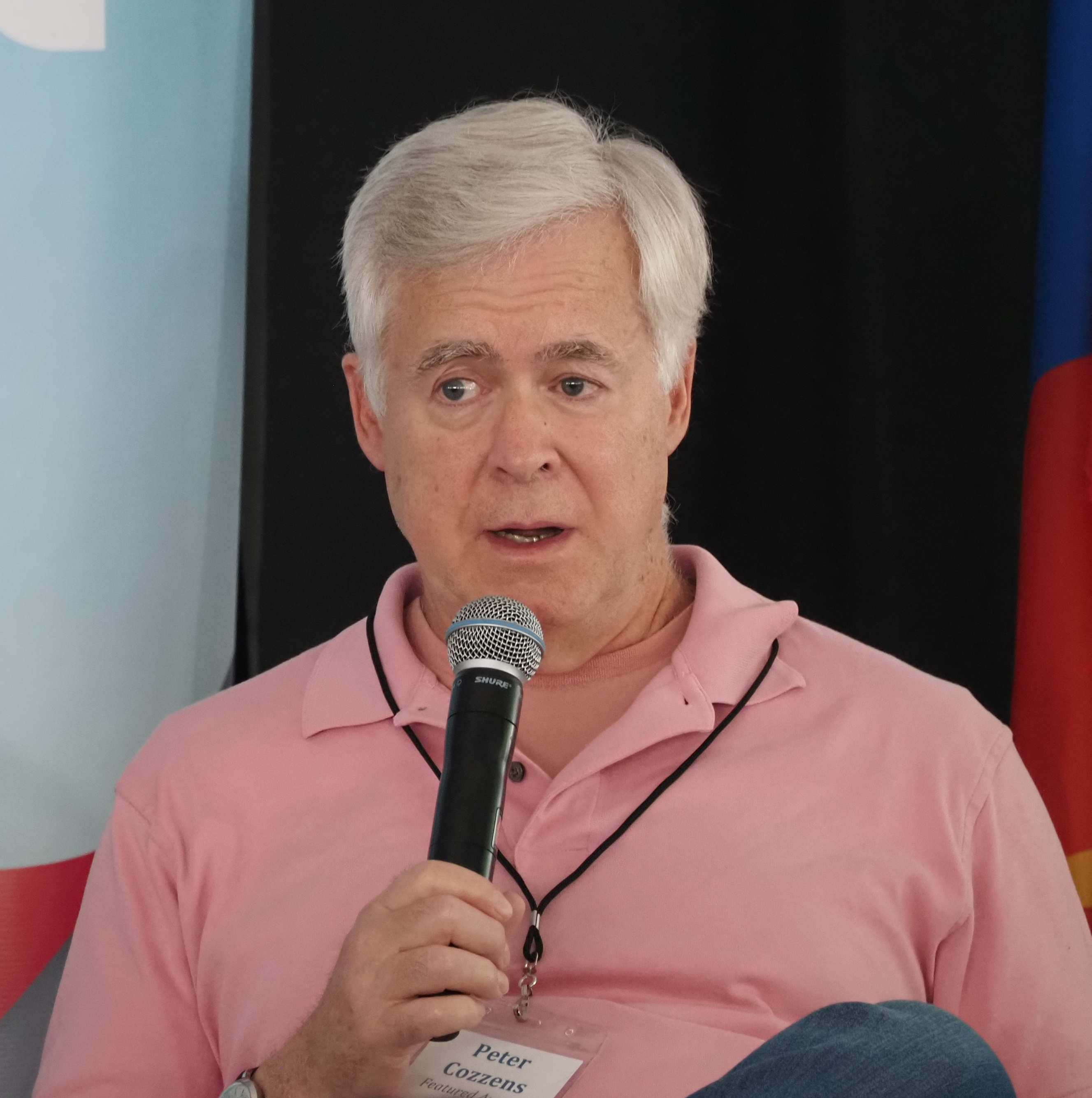
- at the 2026 Gaithersburg Book Festival
- Military career
- Allegiance: American
- Branch: United States Army, State Department
- Awards: The William R. Rivkin Award; Gilder Lehrman Prize for Military History
- Other work: Historian

Peter Cozzens (born 1957) is an American historian and retired U.S. Foreign Service Officer. He has written and/or edited over seventeen books on the American Civil War and the American Indian Wars.

== Early life ==
Peter Cozzens grew up in Wheaton, Illinois.

== Career ==
=== The Earth Is Weeping ===
The Earth Is Weeping chronicles the Indian Wars for the American West in their totality. Cozzens begins his narrative with the 1866 resistance movement led by Red Cloud.

Smithsonian.com named it one of the top ten history books of 2016. Amazon highlighted it as one of the best books of 2016 in the history category.

It is the recipient of the 2016 Guggenheim-Lehrman Prize in Military History awarded for the best book published on the subject in the English language in 2016.

== Awards ==
He received the Superior Honor Award from the US State Department in 1997. In 2002, he received The William R. Rivkin Award from the American Foreign Service Association, awarded to one Foreign Service Officer annually for "extraordinary accomplishment involving initiative, integrity, intellectual courage and constructive dissent". He also received an Alumni Achievement Award from his alma mater Knox College. Cozzens was named the 2016 recipient of the Gilder Lehrman Prize for Military History for his book, The Earth is Weeping.

Cozzens serves on the Advisory Council of the Lincoln Prize.

== Personal life ==
He lives with his wife Antonia Feldman in Kensington, Maryland.

He has detailed his history with bipolar disorder and mental illness, including the potential the condition had to enable his writing career.

== Selected works ==
- Deadwood: Gold, Guns, and Greed in the American West. Alfred A. Knopf. 2025. ISBN 978-0593537855. OCLC 1478325514.
- A Brutal Reckoning: Andrew Jackson, the Creek Indians, and the Epic War for the American South. Alfred A. Knopf. 2023. ISBN 978-0525659457. OCLC 1330202779.
- Tecumseh and the Prophet: The Shawnee Brothers Who Defied a Nation. Alfred A. Knopf. 2020. ISBN 978-1524733254. OCLC 1264231981.
- The Earth Is Weeping: The Epic Story of the Indian Wars for the American West. Alfred A. Knopf. 2016. ISBN 9780307958044. OCLC 930364284.
- Shenandoah 1862: Stonewall Jackson's Valley Campaign. University of North Carolina Press. 2008. ISBN 9780807832004. OCLC 213358059.
- General John Pope: a Life for the Nation. University of Illinois Press. 2000. ISBN 0252023633. OCLC 42289679.
- The Darkest Days of the War: The Battles of Iuka and Corinth. University of North Carolina Press. 1997. ISBN 0807823201. OCLC 34984056.
- The Shipwreck of Their Hopes: The Battles for Chattanooga. University of Illinois Press. 1994. ISBN 0252019229. OCLC 29877161.
- This Terrible Sound: The Battle of Chickamauga. University of Illinois Press. 1992. ISBN 0252065948. OCLC 931918657.
- No Better Place to Die: The Battle of Stones River. University of Illinois Press. 1990. ISBN 0252016521. OCLC 19266989.
