= Army Historical Foundation =

Fundraising institution in the U.S.

- Established: 1983
- President: Burt Thompson
- Chair: Eric Shinseki
- Location: United States
- Website: https://armyhistory.org

Army Historical Foundation is the designated fundraising institution for the National Museum of the United States Army. The foundation also has given out awards to authors of books on military history topics since 1997. The awards are known as the Army Historical Foundation Distinguished Writing Awards. It publishes the quarterly journal On Point.

== Army Historical Foundation Distinguished Writing Awards ==
The Army Historical Foundation Distinguished Writing Awards are given out to books on Army history as well as to authors of journal articles.

=== 2020 Awards ===
2020 Awards
Category	Title	Authors	Publisher
Biography	Courage Above All Things: General John Ellis Wool and the U.S. Military, 1812–1863	Harwood P. Hinton and Jerry Thompson	University of Oklahoma Press
Operational/Battle History	The US Volunteers in the Southern Philippines: Counterinsurgency, Pacification, and Collaboration, 1899–1901	John Scott Reed	University Press of Kansas
Institutional/Functional History	Civil War Supply and Strategy: Feeding Men and Moving Armies	Earl J. Hess	
Journals, Memoirs, and Letters	Rangers Led the Way: WWII Army Rangers in Their Own Words	Chris Ketcherside and George Despotis, MD	Schiffer Military
Unit History	To the Last Man: National Guard Regiment in the Great War, 1917–1919	Jonathan D. Bratten	Army University Press
Reference and Compilation	Civil War Flags of Tennessee	Stephen D. Cox	University of Tennessee Press
Academic Journals	“‘Our Army will hut this Winter at Valley Forge’: George Washington, Decision Making, and the Councils of War”	Ricardo A. Herrera	Army History, Fall 2020
Journals and Magazines	“‘Ernie Was One of Us’”	Ray Morris Jr.	MHQ–The Quarterly Journal of Military History, Autumn 2020.

=== 2019 Awards ===
2019 Awards
Category	Title	Authors	Publisher
Biography	Edward M. Almond and the US Army: From the 92nd Infantry Division to the X Corps	Michael E. Lynch	University Press of Kentucky
Operational/Battle History	Vicksburg: Grant's Campaign That Broke the Confederacy	Donald L. Miller	Simon and Schuster
Institutional/Functional History	Contest for Liberty: Military Leadership in the Continental Army, 1775–1783	Seanegan P. Sculley	Westholme Publishing
Journals, Memoirs, and Letters	Every Man a Hero: A Memoir of D-Day, the First Wave at Omaha Beach, and a World at War	Ray Lambert and Jim DeFelice	William Morrow
Unit History	The Petersburg Regiment in the Civil War: A History of the 12th Virginia Infantry from John Brown's Hanging to Appomattox, 1859–1865	John Horn	Savas Beatie
Reference and Compilation	World War II Infographics	Jean Lopez, Nicholas Aubin, Vincent Bernard, and Nicolas Guillerat	Thames & Hudson
Academic Journals	“The Deadliest Enemy: The U.S. Army and Influenza, 1918–1919,”	Kathleen M. Fargey	Army History, Spring 2019
Journals and Magazines	“Black Soldiers Fought Segregation, Germans,”	Lt. Gen. Daniel P. Bolger, U.S. Army retired	Army, December 2019
