= Bibliography of World War I =

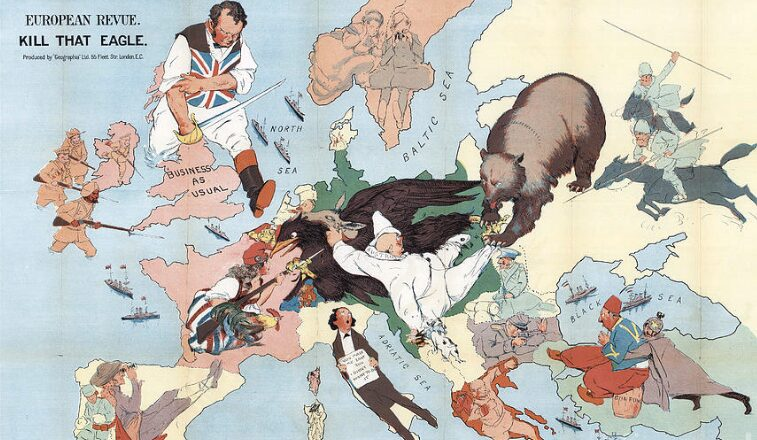
"European Revue. Kill That Eagle" by John Henry Amschewitz, 1914; Germany is the black eagle in the center, surrounded by enemies and bystanders, with only Austria (the clown in white) helping.

This list contains a selection of books on World War I, using APA style citations.

== Reference works ==
- De Groot, Gerard J. (2001). The First World War. Basingstoke: Palgrave. ISBN 978-0333745342.
- Ellis, Robert, John, and Mike Cox. The World War I Databook: The Essential Facts and Figures for All the Combatants (2002)
- Encyclopædia Britannica (12th ed. 1922) comprises the 11th edition plus three new volumes 30–31–32 that cover events since 1911 with very thorough coverage of the war as well as every country and colony. partly online in ascii, with guide to article titles
  - full text of vol 30 Abbe to English History
  - scans of each page of vol 30–31–32
- Herman, Gerald. The Pivotal Conflict: A Comprehensive Chronology of the First World War, 1914–1919 (1992) 824pp
- Higham, Robin and Dennis E. Showalter, eds. Researching World War I: A Handbook (2003), highly detailed historiography, stressing military themes; annotates over 1000 books
- Hirschfeld, Gerhard, Gerd Krumeich and Irina Renz, eds. Brill's Encyclopedia of the First World War. (2012) ISBN 978-9004207394. 1105 pgs. (2 vol.) international scope: showcasing the work of recognized World War I experts from 15 countries google books link
- Horne, John, ed. (2012). A Companion to World War I. West Sussex: Wiley-Blackwell. ISBN 978-1119968702
- March, Francis Andrew and Richard Joseph Beamish History of the World War: An Authentic Narrative of the World's Greatest War (1919), popular contemporary history.
- Paxson, Frederic Logan et al. War cyclopedia: a handbook for ready reference on the great war (1918) online edition
- Pope, Stephen; Wheal, Elizabeth-Anne (1995). The Macmillan Dictionary of the First World War. Palgrave Macmillan UK. ISBN 978-0333618226. OCLC 60238536.
- Stevenson, David (1988). The First World War and international politics. Oxford: University Press. ISBN 978-0198730491.
- Tucker, Spencer, ed. The Encyclopedia of World War I: A Political, Social, and Military History (5 vol 2005), online at eBook.com, the most detailed reference source; articles by specialists cover all aspects of the war
- Tucker, Spencer, ed. European Powers in the First World War: An Encyclopedia (1999)
- Winter, Jay, ed. (2014). The Cambridge History of the First World War (3 vol. Cambridge University Press, 2014) online review

=== Atlases and maps ===
- Banks, Arthur (2001). A Military Atlas of the First World War. Barnsley: Leo Cooper reprinted by Pen & Sword. ISBN 978-0850527919
- Bekers, Willem, and Ronald De Meyer. "War on scale: models for the First World War battlefront." in The intellectual response to the first world war: how the conflict impacted on ideas, methods and fields of enquiry (Sussex Academic Press, 2017) pp. 185–204. online
- Chasseaud, Peter. Mapping the first world war (HarperCollins UK, 2013).
- Espenhorst, Jürgen. "A good map is half the battle! The military cartography of the central powers in World War I." In History of military cartography (Springer, Cham, 2016) pp. 83–130.
- Espenhorst, Jürgen. "The Eye of the Army: German Aircraft and Aero Cartography in World War I." In History of Military Cartography (Springer, Cham, 2016) pp. 61–82.
- Esposito, Vincent J. The West Point Atlas of American Wars: 1900–1918 (1997) despite the title covers entire war; online maps from this atlas
- Gregory, Derek. "Gabriel's map: Cartography and corpography in modern war." In Geographies of knowledge and power (Springer, Dordrecht, 2015) pp. 89–121.
- Hammond's frontier atlas of the world war: containing large scale maps of all the battle fronts of Europe and Asia, together with a military map of the United States (1916) online free
- Kaufmann, H. W., and J. E. Kaufmann. Verdun 1916: The Renaissance of the Fortress (Pen and Sword, 2016).

== Overviews ==
- Allen, George H. et al. (1915–1921). The Great War (5 volumes). Philadelphia: George Barrie's Sons.
- Beckett, Ian F. W. (2007). The Great War: 1914–1918. New York: Routledge. ISBN 978-1405812528 A thematic and comprehensive history which provides a complete picture of the war.
- Buchan, John. Nelson's History of the War (24 volumes). London: Thomas Nelson and Sons.
- Carver, Field Marshal Sir Michael ed. (1976). War Lords: Military Commanders of the Twentieth Century. London: Weidenfeld & Nicolson (includes brief bios of Hamilton, Foch, Haig, Falkenhayn).
- Clare, John D., First World War (1994) ISBN 978-1-898-30410-4
- Cruttwell, C. R. M. F. A History of the Great War, 1914–1918 (1934), general military history online free
- Evans, David. Teach yourself – the First World War. (Hodder Arnold, 2004)
- Falls, Cyril. The Great War (1960), general military history
- Gerwarth, Robert, and Erez Manela. "The Great War as a Global War: Imperial Conflict and the Reconfiguration of World Order, 1911–1923." Diplomatic History 38.4 (2014): 786–800. online
- Gerwarth, Robert, and Erez Manela, eds. Empires at War: 1911–1923 (2014), 12 very wide-ranging essays by scholars. excerpt
- Gilbert, Martin (2004). The First World War: A Complete History. New York: Holt ISBN 978-0805076172
- Halpern, Paul G. A Naval History of World War I (1995)
- Hammerton, J. A.; Wilson, H. W., eds. (1914–1919). The Great War: The Standard History of the All-Europe Conflict (13 volumes). London: The Amalgamated Press.
- Hammerton, Sir J. A., ed. (1933). A Popular History of the Great War (6 volumes). London: The Fleetwood House.
- Hart, Peter (2013). The Great War: A Combat History of the First World War. Oxford and New York: Oxford University Press. ISBN 978-0199976270
- Herwig, Holger H. (2009). The First World War: Germany and Austria-Hungary 1914–1918. New York: Bloomsbury Academic. ISBN 978-0340573488
- Herwig, Holger H. and Neil Heyman. Biographical Dictionary of World War I (1982), scholarly sketches of the main military and political leaders of every country.
- Hochschild, Adam (2012). To End All Wars: A Story of Loyalty and Rebellion, 1914–1918. Boston and New York: Mariner Books. ISBN 978-0547750316
- Howard, Michael. The First World War: A Very Short Introduction (2007), by a leading historian excerpt and text search
- Hubatsch, Walther. Germany and the Central Powers in the World War, 1914–1918 (1963)
- Keegan, John (2001). The First World War; An Illustrated History. London: Hutchinson. ISBN 978-0091793920.
- Keegan, John (2000). The First World War. New York: Vintage. ISBN 978-0375700453
- Leonhard, Jörn (2018). Pandora's Box: A History of the First World War. London and Cambridge, MA: The Belknap Press of Harvard University Press. ISBN 978-0786439355.
- Liddell-Hart, Basil H. (1973) [1970]. History of the First World War (3rd ed.). Trowbridge: Redwood Burn Ltd.
- Liddell-Hart, Basil H. (2012). World War I in Outline. Yardley, PA: Westholme Publishing. ISBN 978-1594161612
- Morrow Jr., John H. The Great War: An Imperial History (2003), covers British Empire excerpt and text search
- Meyer, Gerald J (2006). A World Undone: The Story of the Great War 1914 to 1918. Random House. ISBN 978-0553803549.
- Neiberg, Michael S. (2005). Fighting the Great War: A Global History. Cambridge, Mass: Harvard University Press. ISBN 978-0674016965. OCLC 56592292.
- Philpott, William (2014). War of Attrition: Fighting the First World War. New York: Overlook Press. ISBN 978-1468302684
- Robbins, Keith. The First World War (1993), very short overview
- Simkins, Peter, Geoffrey Jukes, and Michael Hickey (2003). The First World War: The War to End All Wars. Foreword by Hew Strachan. Oxford: Osprey Publishing. ISBN 978-1841767383
- Stevenson, David. Cataclysm: The First World War As Political Tragedy (2004) major reinterpretation, 560pp
- Stokesbury, James. A Short History of World War I (1981)
- Storey, William K. (2010). First World War: A Concise Global History. Blue Ridge Summit, PA: Rowman & Littlefield Publishers. ISBN 978-0742541467
- Strachan, Hew. The First World War: Volume I: To Arms (2004): a major scholarly synthesis. Thorough coverage of 1914–16; 1245pp
- Strachan, Hew. The First World War (2004): a 385pp overview
- Strohn, Matthias, ed. (2013). World War I Companion. Osprey Publishing. ISBN 978-1782001881
- Tucker, Spencer C. (1998). Great War, 1914–18. London: UCL Press. ISBN 978-1857283914
- Winter, J. M. The Experience of World War I (2nd ed 2005), topical essays;

=== Primary sources, documents and year books ===
- Collins, Ross F. ed. World War I: Primary Documents on Events from 1914 to 1919 (Debating Historical Issues in the Media of the Time) (2007) West Port, CN; London: Greenwood Press, 425pp ISBN 978-0313320828, OCLC 1253388980
- Gooch, G. P. Recent Revelations Of European Diplomacy (1940), 475pp summarizes memoirs of major participants
- Gooch, G. P. & Harold Temperley, eds. British Documents on the Origins of the War 1898–1914 Volume XI, the Outbreak of War Foreign Office Documents (1926) online
- French Ministry of Foreign Affairs. The French Yellow Book: Diplomatic Documents (1914)
- Mombauer, Annika (2024). The Origins of the First World War: Diplomatic and Military Documents. Manchester and London: Manchester University Press. online
- Hazell's Annual for 1916 (1916), worldwide events of 1915; 640pp online; worldwide coverage of 1915 events; emphasis on Great Britain
- New International Year Book 1914 (1915), Comprehensive coverage of world and national affairs for year 1914, 913pp
- New International Year Book 1915 (1916), Comprehensive coverage of world and national affairs, 791pp
- New International Year Book 1916 (1917), Comprehensive coverage of world and national affairs, 938pp
- New International Year Book 1917 (1918), Comprehensive coverage of world and national affairs, 904 pp
- New International Year Book 1918 (1919), Comprehensive coverage of world and national affairs, 904 pp
- New International Year Book 1919 (1920), Comprehensive coverage of world and national affairs, 744pp
- New International Year Book 1920 (1921), Comprehensive coverage of world and national affairs, 844 pp
- New International Year Book 1921 (1922), Comprehensive coverage of world and national affairs, 848 pp
- Shevin-Coetzee, Marilyn (2010). World War I: A History in Documents. (Oxford University Press). ISBN 978-0199731527

== Official histories ==
Countries on both sides of the conflict published official histories, including the following:

- James Edward Edmonds (1933). Military Operations France and Belgium 1914. History of the Great War. Vol. I. London: MacMillan.
- James Edmonds (1929). Military Operations France and Belgium 1914. History of the Great War. Vol. II. London: MacMillan.
- James Edmonds (1927). Military Operations France and Belgium 1915. History of the Great War. Vol. I. London: MacMillan.
- James Edmonds (1936). Military Operations France and Belgium 1915. History of the Great War. Vol. II. London: MacMillan.
- James Edmonds (1932). Military Operations France and Belgium 1916. History of the Great War. Vol. I. London: MacMillan.
- Wilfried Miles (1938). Military Operations France and Belgium 1916. History of the Great War. Vol. II. Londo: MacMillan.
- Cyril Falls (1940). Military Operations France and Belgium 1917. History of the Great War. Vol. I. London: MacMillan.
- Cyril Falls (1948). Military Operations France and Belgium 1917. History of the Great War. Vol. II. London: MacMillan.
- Cyril Falls (1925). Military Operations France and Belgium 1917. History of the Great War. Vol. III. London: MacMillan.
- James Edmonds (1935). Military Operations France and Belgium 1918. History of the Great War. Vol. I. London: MacMillan.
- James Edmonds (1925). Military Operations France and Belgium 1918. History of the Great War. Vol. II. London: MacMillan.
- James Edmonds (1939). Military Operations France and Belgium 1918. History of the Great War. Vol. III. London: MacMillan.
- James Edmonds (1939). Military Operations France and Belgium 1918. History of the Great War. Vol. IV. London: MacMillan.
- James Edmonds (1925). Military Operations France and Belgium 1918. History of the Great War. Vol. V. London: MacMillan.
- C. F. Aspinall-Oglander (1929). Military operations. Gallipoli. History of the Great War Based on Official Documents. Vol. I. London: MacMillan.
- C. F. Aspinall-Oglander (1932). Military operations. Gallipoli. History of the Great War Based on Official Documents. Vol. II. London: MacMillan.
- F. J. Moberly (1929). Military operations Togoland and the Cameroons. History of the Great War Based on Official Documents. London: His Majesty's Stationery Office. OCLC 67558833.
- Frederick James Moberly (1923). The campaign in Mesopotamia: 1914-1918. History of the Great War Based on Official Documents. Vol. I. London: His Majesty's Stationery Office. OCLC 772784341.
- Frederick James Moberly (1924). The campaign in Mesopotamia: 1914-1918. History of the Great War Based on Official Documents. Vol. II. London: His Majesty's Stationery Office. OCLC 772783874.
- Frederick James Moberly (1925). The campaign in Mesopotamia: 1914-1918. History of the Great War Based on Official Documents. Vol. III. London: His Majesty's Stationery Office. OCLC 772784343.
- Frederick James Moberly (1927). The campaign in Mesopotamia: 1914-1918. History of the Great War Based on Official Documents. Vol. IV. London: His Majesty's Stationery Office. OCLC 772784344.
- Frederick James Moberly (1929). Operations in Persia 1914–1919. History of the Great War Based on Official Documents. London: His Majesty's Stationery Office.
- Walter Alexander Raleigh (1922). The War in the Air: Being the Story of the Part played in the Great War by the Royal Air Force. History of the Great War. Vol. I. Oxford: Clarendon Press. OCLC 785856329.
- Henry Albert Jones (1928). The War in the Air: Being the Story of the Part played in the Great War by the Royal Air Force. History of the Great War. Vol. II. London: Clarendon Press. OCLC 924164573.
- Henry Albert Jones (1931). The War in the Air: Being the Story of the Part played in the Great War by the Royal Air Force. History of the Great War. Vol. III. London: Clarendon Press. OCLC 831226907.
- Henry Albert Jones (1934). The War in the Air: Being the Story of the Part played in the Great War by the Royal Air Force. History of the Great War. Vol. IV. London: Clarendon Press. OCLC 836194155.
- Henry Albert Jones (1935). The War in the Air: Being the Story of the Part played in the Great War by the Royal Air Force. History of the Great War. Vol. V. London: Clarendon Press. OCLC 494596777.
- Henry Albert Jones (1937). The War in the Air: Being the Story of the Part played in the Great War by the Royal Air Force. History of the Great War. Vol. VI. London: Clarendon Press. OCLC 769886212.
- Henry Albert Jones (1937). The War in the Air: Being the Story of the Part played in the Great War by the Royal Air Force. History of the Great War. Vol. VII. London: Clarendon Press. OCLC 769886213.
- Julian Stafford Corbett (1920). Naval Operations. History of the Great War Based on Official Documents. Vol. I. London: Longmans, Green & Co. OCLC 1046310566.
- Julian Stafford Corbett (1921). Naval Operations. History of the Great War Based on Official Documents. Vol. II. London: Longmans, Green & Co. OCLC 220474040.
- Julian Stafford Corbett (1923). Naval Operations. History of the Great War Based on Official Documents. Vol. III. London: Longmans, Green & Co. OCLC 1068265523.
- Julian Stafford Corbett (1928). Naval Operations. History of the Great War Based on Official Documents. Vol. IV. London: Longmans, Green & Co. OCLC 1068581345.
- Henry Newbolt (1996). Naval Operations. History of the Great War Based on Official Documents. Vol. V. Nashville: Battery Press. ISBN 0-89839-255-1.
- Reichsarchiv, ed. (1925). Die Grenzschlachten im Westen. Der Weltkrieg 1914 bis 1918. Vol. I. Berlin: Mittler und Sohn.
- Reichsarchiv, ed. (1925). Die Befreiung Ostpreußens. Der Weltkrieg 1914 bis 1918. Vol. II. Berlin: Mittler und Sohn. OCLC 731017674.
- Reichsarchiv, ed. (1926). Der Marne-Feldzug Teil 1 Von der Sambre zur Marne. Der Weltkrieg 1914 bis 1918. Vol. III. Berlin: Mittler und Sohn.
- Reichsarchiv, ed. (1926). Der Marne-Feldzug Teil 2 Die Schlacht. Der Weltkrieg 1914 bis 1918. Vol. IV. Berlin: Mittler und Sohn.
- Reichsarchiv, ed. (1929). Der Herbstfeldzug 1914 Im Westen bis zum Stellungskrieg, im Osten bis zum Rückzug. Der Weltkrieg 1914 bis 1918. Vol. V. Berlin: Mittler & Sohn. OCLC 1070932306.
- Reichsarchiv, ed. (1929). Der Herbst-Feldzug 1914; 2. Der Abschluß der Operationen im Westen und Osten. Der Weltkrieg 1914 bis 1918. Vol. VI. Berlin: Mittler & Sohn. OCLC 904378155.
- Reichsarchiv, ed. (1931). Die Operationen des Jahres 1915 Teil 1 Die Ereignisse im Winter und Frühjahr. Der Weltkrieg 1914 bis 1918. Vol. VII. Berlin: Mittler & Sohn.
- Reichsarchiv, ed. (1932). Die Operationen des Jahres 1915 Teil 2 Die Ereignisse im Westen im Frühjahr und Sommer, im Osten vom Frühjahr bis zum Jahresschluß. Der Weltkrieg 1914 bis 1918. Vol. VIII. Berlin: Mittler & Sohn.
- Reichsarchiv, ed. (1933). Die Operationen des Jahres 1915 Teil 3 Die Ereignisse im Westen und auf dem Balkan vom Sommer bis zum Jahresschluß. Der Weltkrieg 1914 bis 1918. Vol. IX. Berlin: Mittler & Sohn.
- Reichsarchiv, ed. (1936). Die Operationen des Jahres 1916 bis zum Wechsel in der Obersten Heeresleitung. Der Weltkrieg 1914 bis 1918. Vol. X. Berlin: Mittler & Sohn.
- Reichsarchiv, ed. (1938). Die Kriegsführung im Herbst 1916 und im Winter 1916/17 vom Wechsel in der Obersten Heeresleitung bis zum Entschluß zum Rückzug in die Siegfried-Stellung. Der Weltkrieg 1914 bis 1918. Vol. XI. Berlin: Mittler & Sohn.
- Reichsarchiv, ed. (1939). Die Kriegsführung im Frühjahr 1917. Der Weltkrieg 1914 bis 1918. Vol. XII. Berlin: Mittler & Sohn.
- Reichsarchiv, ed. (1942). Die Kriegführung im Sommer und Herbst 1917. Die Ereignisse außerhalb der Westfront bis November 1918. Der Weltkrieg 1914 bis 1918. Vol. XIII. Berlin: Mittler & Sohn.
- Reichsarchiv, ed. (1944). Die Kriegführung an der Westfront im Jahre 1918 Teil 1. Der Weltkrieg 1914 bis 1918. Vol. XIV. Berlin: Mittler & Sohn.
- Reichsarchiv, ed. (1944). Die Kriegführung an der Westfront im Jahre 1918 Teil 2. Der Weltkrieg 1914 bis 1918. Vol. XIV. Berlin: Mittler & Sohn.
- Les Armées Françaises dans la Grande Guerre (in French). Paris: Imprimerie Nationale. 1922–1937. (106 volumes)
- Charles E. W. Bean, ed. (1920–1942). Official History of Australia in the War of 1914–1918. (12 volumes)
- National Military Establishment, Historical Division. Official History of the United States Army in the First World War 1917–1919. (18 volumes)
- Glaise von Horstenau, Edmund (1932). Österreich-Ungarns letzter Krieg 1914–1918 (in German). Vienna: Verl. der Militärwiss. Mitteilungen. (15 volumes)
- Nicholson, G.W.L. (1962). Official History of the Canadian Army in the First World War: Canadian Expeditionary Force 1914–1919 (PDF). Ottawa: Queen's Printer and Controller of Stationery. OCLC 557523890. Archived from the original (PDF) on 2011-08-26. (single volume)
- Stato Maggiore dell'Esercito, Ufficio Storico (1927–1988). L'Esercito Italiano nella Grande Guerra 1915–1918 (in Italian). Rome. (7 volumes)

== Causes and diplomacy ==
- Albertini, Luigi. The Origins of the War of 1914. New updated edition with an introduction by Samuel R. Williamson. 3-vol. paperback set (New York: Enigma Books, 2005) ISBN 192963126X
  - Albertini, Luigi (1952). The Origins of the War of 1914. Vol. 2. Oxford: Oxford University Press. OCLC 174233433.
- Aksakal, Mustafa. "The Ottoman Road to War in 1914: The Ottoman Empire and the First World War." (Cambridge: Cambridge University Press, 2010). ISBN 0521175259
- Barnes, Harry Elmer (1927). The Genesis Of The World War. New York: H. Fertig. OCLC 58671.
- Chakraborty, Kaushik (2008). Relocating the Origins of the First World War: Imperialism, Finance, Capital, Socialism, Nationalism, Power Rivalry, War Aims and War Guilt or Kriegeschuldfrage (1870–1914. Kolkata: Readers Service. ISBN 9788187891796.
- Clark, Christopher (2014). The Sleepwalkers: How Europe Went to War in 1914. New York: Harper Books. ISBN 978-0061146664.
- Evans, R. J. W.; Pogge Von Strandman, Hartmut (1988). The Coming of the First World War. Oxford: Oxford University Press. OCLC 924273281.
- Fay, Sidney (1966). Before Sarajevo. The Origins Of The World War. Vol. 1. London: Collier-Macmillan. OCLC 43174229.
- Fay, Sidney (1966). After Sarajevo. The Origins Of The World War. Vol. 2. New York: Free Press. OCLC 664579601.
- Fischer, Fritz; Jackson, Marian (1975). War of Illusions: German Policies From 1911 to 1914. New York: Norton. ISBN 978-0393054804. OCLC 221830012.
- Fischer, Fritz (1967). Germany's Aims in the First World War. New York: Norton. ISBN 978-0393053470. OCLC 1558559.
- Fromkin, D. (2004). Europe's Last Summer. Who started the Great War in 1914?. London: Vintage. ISBN 9780099430841.
- Gilpin, Robert (1999). War and Change in World Politics. Cambridge: Cambridge University Press. ISBN 9780521273763.
- Gooch, G.P. (1924). History of modern Europe, 1878–1919. London: Cassell. OCLC 935501464.
- Gooch, G.P. (1936). The grouping of the powers. Before the war: studies in diplomacy. Vol. 1.
- Gooch, G.P. (1938). The coming of the storm. Before the war: studies in diplomacy. Vol. 2.
- Hamilton, Richard F.; Herwig, Holger H. (2004). Decisions for War, 1914–1917.
- Herrmann, David G (1996). The Arming of Europe and the Making of the First World War. Princeton, New Jersey: Princeton University Press. ISBN 978-0691033747. OCLC 32509928.
- Henig, Ruth B. (1993). The Origins of the First World War. Florence, KY: Routledge. ISBN 978-0415102339
- Hewitson, Mark (2004). Germany and the Causes of the First World War. Oxford: Berg Publishers. ISBN 978-1859738658
- John Horne, ed. (2012). A Companion to World War I. Malden, Mass.: Wiley-Blackwell. ISBN 9781119968702.
- Joll, James (1984). The Origins of the First World War.
- Kaiser, David E. (September 1983). "Germany and the Origins of the First World War". The Journal of Modern History. 55 (3): 442–474.
- Kennan, George (1984). The Fateful Alliance: France, Russia, and the Coming of the First World War. New York: Pantheon Books. ISBN 978-0394534947
- Kennedy, Paul M. (2014). The War Plans of the Great Powers, 1880–1914. Hoboken: Taylor and Francis. ISBN 9781317702528.
- Kennedy, Paul M. (1981). The Rise of the Anglo-German Antagonism, 1860–1914.
- Knutsen, Torbjørn L. (1999). The Rise and Fall of World Orders. Manchester University Press.
- Lee, Dwight E. (1958). The Outbreak of the First World War: Who Was Responsible?. Boston: D.C. Heath & Co. OCLC 778305123.
- McCullough, Edward E. (1999). How The First World War Began.
- McMeekin, Sean (2011). Russian Origins of the First World War. Cambridge, MA: Harvard University Press. ISBN 978-0674062108
- Mombauer, Annika (2013). The Origins of the First World War: Diplomatic and Military Documents. Manchester and London: Manchester University Press. ISBN 978-0719074219
- Mulligan, William (2010). The Origins of the First World War. Cambridge and New York: Cambridge University Press. ISBN 978-0521713948
- Neilson, Francis (1916). How Diplomats Make War.
- Nock, Albert Jay. (1922). The Myth of a Guilty Nation. B.W. Huebsch, Incorporated.
- Ponting, Clive. Thirteen Days: Diplomacy and Disaster – The Countdown to the Great War (2002)
- Radojević, Mira (2015). "Jovan M. Jovanović on the outbreak of the First World War". The Serbs and the First World War 1914–1918. Belgrade: Serbian Academy of Sciences and Arts. pp. 187–204. ISBN 978-8670256590.
- Remak, Joachim (1995). The Origins of World War I, 1871–1914. San Diego: Harcourt Brace. ISBN 978-0155014381
- Ross, Stewart (2003). Causes and Consequences of the First World War.
- Sonta, Raymond James (1933). European Diplomatic History 1871–1932.
- Spender, J.A. (1933). Fifty years of Europe: a study in pre-war documents.
- Stevenson, David (200). The First World War and International Politics.
- Taylor, A.J.P. (1954). The Struggle for Mastery in Europe 1848–1918.
- Tuchman, Barbara (2012). The Guns of August. New York: Library of America. ISBN 9781598531459.
- Turner, Leonard Charles Frederick (1976). Origins of the First World War. London: Edward Arnold. ISBN 978-0393099478.
- Vyvyan, J. M. K. (1968). "The Approach of the War of 1914". In C. L. Mowat (ed.). The Shifting Balance of World Forces 1898–1945. The New Cambridge Modern History. Vol. XII. Cambridge: Cambridge University Press. OCLC 971160100.
- Zametica, John (2017). Folly and Malice: The Habsburg Empire, the Balkans and the Start of World War One. London: Shepheard-Walwyn. ISBN 9780856835131.

=== Early peace negotiations ===
- Zelikow, Philip D. The Road Less Traveled: The Secret Battle to End the Great War, 1916-1917. PublicAffairs, 2021

== Allied Forces ==
=== Britain ===
- French, David. British Strategy and War Aims 1914–1916 (Routledge, 2014) ISBN 0415749905
- Holmes, Richard. Tommy: the British soldier on the Western Front, 1914–1918 (Marshall Pickering, 2004) ISBN 0007137524
- Messenger, Charles. Call To Arms: The British Army 1914–1918 (2005) ISBN 0297846957
- Pegler, Martin. British Tommy 1914–18 (1996) ISBN 1855325411
- Sheffield, Gary D. Leadership in the Trenches: Officer-Man Relations, Morale, and Discipline in the British Army in the Era of the First World War (St. Martin's Press, 2000) ISBN 0312226403
- Watson, Alexander. Enduring the Great War: Combat, morale and collapse in the German and British armies, 1914–1918 (Cambridge University Press, 2008) ISBN 978-0521123082

==== Australia and New Zealand ====
- Coulthard-Clark, Christopher D (2001). The Encyclopaedia of Australia's Battles. Crows Nest, New South Wales: Allen & Unwin. p. 320. ISBN 978-1865086347. OCLC 48793439.
- Davison, Graeme, John Hirst, and Stuart Macintyre, eds. The Oxford Companion to Australian History (2001) ISBN 019551503X Online at OUP
- Grey, Jeffrey. A military history of Australia (Cambridge University Press, 1st ed: 1999; 3rd ed: 2008 ISBN 978-0521875233)
- Pugsley, Christopher. The Anzac Experience: New Zealand, Australia and Empire in the First World War (2004) ISBN 978-0947506001

==== Canada ====
- Berton, Pierre. Marching As To War, Canada's Turbulent Years 1899–1953 (2001), ch 2; Popular narrative
- Cook, Tim. "Quill and Canon: Writing the Great War in Canada," American Review of Canadian Studies, Vol. 35, 2005
- Dickson, Paul Douglas. A Thoroughly Canadian General: A Biography of General H.D.G. Crerar (2007) excerpt and text search
- Granatstein, Jack, and J.M. Hitsman, Broken Promises: A History of Conscription in Canada (1977)
- Hunter, Mark C. To Employ and Uplift Them: The Newfoundland Naval Reserve, 1899–1926 (2009)
- Milner, Marc. Canadian Military History. Toronto: Copp Clark Putnam, 1993. Includes problems of Canadian recruiting and the 1917 draft crisis (with its problems over Quebec)
- Morton, Desmond, and J. L. Granatstein Marching to Armageddon: Canadians and the Great War 1914–1919 (1989)
- Vance, Jonathan F. Death So Noble: Memory, Meaning, and the First World War (1997), cultural history
- Wade, Mason. The French Canadians, 1760–1945 (1955), ch 12

==== Africa, South Africa ====
- Buchan, John (1992). The history of the South African forces in France (Litho reprint of 1920 ed.). London: Imperial War Museum & Battery Press. ISBN 978-0901627896.
- Digby, Peter. K. (1993). Pyramids and Poppies: The 1st SA Infantry Brigade in Libya, France and Flanders: 1915–1919. Rivonia: Ashanti. ISBN 978-1874800538.
- Farwell, Byron (1989). The Great War in Africa, 1914–1918. W.W. Norton. ISBN 978-0393305647.
- Miller, Charles. Battle for the Bundu: the First World War in East Africa. New York: Macmillan Publishing Co., 1974. ISBN 0025849301

==== India ====
- Pati, Budheswar (1996). India and the First World War. Atlantic Publishers. ISBN 978-8171565818.

=== China ===
- Xingqing, Gu. Ou zhan gong zuo hui yi lu (欧战工作回忆录; Reminiscences on my work during the European War) (1937).

=== France ===
- Adamthwaite, Anthony. Grandeur And Misery: France's Bid for Power in Europe, 1914–1940 (1995) pp 1–39
- Bonzon, Thierry. "Consumption and Total Warfare in Paris (1914–1918)." In F. Trentmann and F. Just, eds. Food and Conflict in Europe in the Age of the Two World Wars (2006) pp. 49–64. online
- Bruce, Robert Bowman. A Fraternity of Arms: America and France in the Great War (UP of Kansas, 2003).
- Cabanes Bruno. August 1914: France, the Great War, and a Month That Changed the World Forever (2016) argues that the very first month of fighting transformed the French mind.
- Clayton, Anthony. Paths of Glory: the French Army 1914–18 (London: Cassell, 2003)
- Dutton, David. The Politics of Diplomacy: Britain, France and the Balkans in the First World War (1998).
- Fogarty, Richard S. Race and war in France: Colonial subjects in the French army, 1914–1918 (Johns Hopkins University Press, 2008)
- Fridenson, Patrick. The French home front, 1914–1918 (Berg, 1992).
- Greenhalgh, Elizabeth. Victory through Coalition: Britain and France during the First World War (Cambridge University Press, 2005) 304pp
- Greenhalgh, Elizabeth. The French Army and the First World War (Armies of the Great War) (Cambridge University Press, 2014), 486 p, ISBN 978-1107605688
- Goya, Michel. Flesh and Steel During the Great War: The Transformation of the French Army and the Invention of Modern Warfare (Pen and Sword Military, 2018) – ISBN 978-1473886964
- Keiger, John. France and the Origins of the First World War (1985) online
- Smith, Leonard V. Between Mutiny and Obedience: the Case of the French Fifth Infantry Division during World War I (Princeton University Press, 1994)
- Smith, Leonard V. The Embattled Self: French Soldiers' Testimony of the Great War (2014) Excerpt and text search
- Smith, Leonard V. et al. France and the Great War (2003) 222pp; excerpt and text search
- Stovall, Tyler (2008). "The Consumers' War: Paris, 1914–1918". French Historical Studies. 31 (2): 293–325. doi:10.1215/00161071-2007-023.
- Stovall, Tyler. Paris and the spirit of 1919: consumer struggles, transnationalism and revolution (2012).
- Sumner, Ian. The French Army 1914–18 (1995) excerpt and text search
- Sumner, Ian. They Shall Not Pass: The French Army on the Western Front 1914–1918 (2012)
- Winter, Jay, and Jean-Louis Robert. Capital Cities at War: Paris, London, Berlin 1914–1919 (2 vol Cambridge UP, 1997, 2007). online review

==== Historiography ====
- Cox Gary. "France" in Robin Higham and Dennis E. Showalter, eds. Researching World War I: A Handbook (2003) pp 51–78.
- Hanna, Martha; Horne, John (2016). "France and the Great War on Its Centenary". French Historical Studies. 39 (2): 233–259. doi:10.1215/00161071-3438007.
- Nester, Cody (2015). "France and the Great War: Belligerent Warmonger or Failed Peacekeeper? A Literature Review". History. 12: 2.
- Smith, Leonard V (2007). "The 'Culture de guerre'and French Historiography of the Great War of 1914–1918". History Compass. 5 (6): 1967–1979. doi:10.1111/j.1478-0542.2007.00484.x.

=== Italy ===
- Ferrari, Paolo. "The Memory And Historiography Of The First World War In Italy". Comillas Journal of International Relations (2015) #2 pp 117–126 ISSN 2386-5776 online
- Gibelli, Antonio. La Grande Guerra degli italiani, 1915–1918, Milano, Sansoni (1998)
- Gooch, John. The Italian army and the first world war (Cambridge University Press, 2014).
- Lowe, C.J. (1969). "Britain and Italian Intervention 1914–1915". Historical Journal. 12 (3): 533–548. doi:10.1017/s0018246x00007275. S2CID 162738142.
- Page, Thomas N. Italy and the World War, New York, Charles Scribner's Sons Full Text Available Online (1920)
- Pergher, Roberta. "An Italian War? War and Nation in the Italian Historiography of the First World War". Journal of Modern History (Dec 2018) 90#4
- Renzi, William A. In the Shadow of the Sword: Italy's Neutrality and Entrance Into the Great War, 1914–1915 (1987).
- Thompson, Mark. The White War: Life and Death on the Italian Front, 1915–1919 excerpt and text search (2009)

=== Japan ===
- Best, Antony, and Oliviero Frattolillo, eds. Japan and the Great War. (Palgrave, 2015). online
- Dickinson, Frederick R. War and National Reinvention: Japan in the Great War, 1914–1919 (Harvard Univ Asia Center, 1999).
- Duus, Peter, ed. The Cambridge history of Japan: The twentieth century (Cambridge University Press, 1989).
- Saxon, Timothy D. "Anglo-Japanese Naval Cooperation, 1914–1918." Naval War College Review, 53#1 (2000): 62–92.
- Strachan, Hew. The First World War: Volume I: To Arms (Oxford University Press, 2003) 455–94.

=== Russia ===
- Acton, Edward, V. et al. eds. Critical companion to the Russian Revolution, 1914–1921 (Indiana UP, 1997).
- Boterbloem, Kees (2012). "Chto delat'?: World War I in Russian Historiography after Communism". Journal of Slavic Military Studies. 25 (3): 393–408. doi:10.1080/13518046.2012.705655. S2CID 143954021.
- Cornish, Nik; Karachtchouk, Andrei (ill.) (2001). The Russian Army 1914–18. Men-at-Arms. Oxford: Osprey Publishing. pp. 48. ISBN 978-1841763033. OCLC 248331622.
- Engelstein, Laura. Russia in Flames: War, Revolution, Civil War, 1914–1921 (Oxford UP, 2018).
- Gatrell, Peter. Russia's First World War: A social and economic history (Pearson Education, 2005).
- Lincoln, W. Bruce. Passage Through Armageddon: The Russians in War and Revolution, 1914–1918 (1986).
- Marshall, Alex. "Russian military intelligence, 1905–1917: The untold story behind tsarist Russia in the First World War." War in History 11.4 (2004): 393–423.
- Neilson, Keith. Strategy and Supply: The Anglo-Russian Alliance 1914–1917 (Routledge, 2014).
- Read, Christopher. War and revolution in Russia, 1914–22: the collapse of Tsarism and the establishment of Soviet power (Macmillan International Higher Education, 2012).
- Rutherford, Ward. The Tsar's War, 1914–1917: The Story of the Imperial Russian Army in the First World War (Faulkner, 1992).
- Stone, David R (2015). The Russian Army in the Great War: The Eastern Front, 1914–1917. Lawrence: University Press of Kansas. ISBN 978-0700620951.

=== United States ===
- American Battle Monuments Commission (1938). American armies and battlefields in Europe : a history, guide, and reference book. U.S.G.P.O.Selected photos available online through the Washington State Library's Classics in Washington History collection
- American Battle Monuments Commission (1938). American armies and battlefields in Europe : a history, guide, and reference book. U.S.G.P.O.Maps available online through the Washington State Office of the Secretary of State's Washington History collection
- Ayres, Leonard P, The War with Germany: A Statistical Summary Government Printing Office, 1919 full text online
- Ball, Gregory W. They Called Them Soldier Boys: A Texas Infantry Regiment in World War I (University of North Texas Press, 2013) ISBN 978-1574415001
- Beaver, Daniel R. Newton D. Baker and the American War Effort, 1917–1919 (1966)
- Carroll, Andrew (2017). My Fellow Soldiers: General John Pershing and the Americans Who Helped Win the Great War. Penguin Press. ISBN 978-1594206481.
- Chambers, John W., II. To Raise an Army: The Draft Comes to Modern America (1987) ISBN 0029058201
- Cobbs Hoffman, Elizabeth (2017). The Hello Girls: America's First Women Soldiers. Harvard University Press. ISBN 978-0674971479.
- Coffman, Edward M (1998). The War to End All Wars: The American Military Experience in World War I. Lexington, Kentucky: University Press of Kentucky. ISBN 978-0813109558. OCLC 38842092.
- Elson, Aaron. The Armored Fist: The 712th Tank Battalion in the Second World War (Fonthill Media, 2014) ISBN 9781781550915
- Fax, G. E. (2017). With their bare hands: General Pershing, the 79th Division, and the battle for Montfaucon. Osprey Publishing. ISBN 9781472819239.
- Hallas, James H. Doughboy War: The American Expeditionary Force in World War I (2000) ISBN 1555878555
- Howarth, Stephen. To Shining Sea: A History of the United States Navy, 1775–1991 (1991) ISBN 0394576624
- Kennedy, David M (1982). Over Here: The First World War and American Society. Oxford: Oxford University Press. ISBN 978-0195032093. OCLC 9906841., covers politics & economics & society
- Koistinen, Paul. Mobilizing for Modern War: The Political Economy of American Warfare, 1865–1919 (1997) ISBN 0700608605
- Marrin, Albert (1986). The Yanks Are Coming: The United States in the First World War. New York: Atheneum Books. ISBN 978-0689312090.
- Meyer, Gerald J. (2017). The World Remade: America in World War I. New York: Bantam Books. ISBN 978-0553393323.
- Mills, Bill B. (2017). Treacherous passage: Germany's secret plot against the United States in Mexico during World War I. Potomac Books, an imprint of the University of Nebraska Press. ISBN 978-1612348544.
- Shay, Michael E. Sky Pilots: The Yankee Division Chaplains in World War I (University of Missouri Press, 2014) ISBN 978-0826220318
- Titus, James, ed. The Home Front and War in the Twentieth Century: The American Experience in Comparative Perspective (1984) essays by scholars. online free
- Trask, David F. The United States in the Supreme War Council: American War Aims and Inter-Allied Strategy, 1917–1918 (1961)
- United States Army Center of Military History (1993). Army Art of World War I. Smithsonian Institution, National Museum of American History. OCLC 28608539 – via Washington State Library [20th Century Events].
- Venzon, Anne ed. The United States in the First World War: An Encyclopedia (1995) ISBN 0824070550
- Woodward, David. The American Army and the First World War (Cambridge University Press, 2014) ISBN 978-1107011441
- Woodward, David ed. America and World War I: A Selected Annotated Bibliography of English-Language Sources (2nd ed. 2007) excerpt

== Germany and the Central Powers ==
- Afflerbach, Holger (1998). "Wilhelm II as Supreme Warlord in the First World War". War in History. 5 (4): 427–449. doi:10.1177/096834459800500403. S2CID 159799380.
- Cecil, Lamar (1996). Wilhelm II: Emperor and Exile, 1900–1941. Vol. II. Chapel Hill, North Carolina: University of North Carolina Press. p. 176. ISBN 978-0807822838. OCLC 186744003.
- Hall, Richard C (Summer 2011). "Bulgaria in the First World War". Historian. 73 (2): 300–315. doi:10.1111/j.1540-6563.2011.00293.x. S2CID 142538427.
- Hall, Richard C. "'The Enemy is Behind Us': The Morale Crisis in the Bulgarian Army during the Summer of 1918," War in History, (April 2004), 11#2 pp 209–219,
- Herwig, Holger H (1996). The First World War: Germany and Austria–Hungary 1914–1918. London: Arnold. ISBN 978-0340573488. OCLC 60154404.
- Hubatsch, Walther; Backus, Oswald P (1963). Germany and the Central Powers in the World War, 1914–1918. Lawrence, Kansas: University of Kansas. OCLC 250441891.
- Karau, Mark D. Germany's Defeat in the First World War: The Lost Battles and Reckless Gambles That Brought Down the Second Reich (ABC-CLIO, 2015) scholarly analysis. excerpt
- Lutz, Ralph (1932). Fall of the German Empire 1914–1918, Volume I. Stanford University Press. ISBN 978-0804723800.
- Watson, Alexander. Ring of Steel: Germany and Austria-Hungary at War, 1914–1918 (2014), excerpt

=== German army ===
- Histories of Two Hundred and Fifty-One Divisions of the German Army Which Participated in the War (1914-1918). Document (United States. War Department) No. 905. Washington, D.C.: Government Printing Office. 1920. OCLC 1387464.
- Rogers, Duncan, ed. (2010). Landrecies to Cambrai: Case Studies of German Offensive and Defensive Operations on the Western Front 1914–17. Solihull: Helion. ISBN 978-1906033767.
- Sheldon, J. (2010). The German Army at Ypres 1914. Barnsley: Pen and Sword Military. ISBN 978-1848841130.
- Sheldon, J. (2012). The German Army on the Western Front, 1915. Barnsley: Pen and Sword Military. ISBN 978-1848844667.
- Sheldon, J. (2005). The German Army on the Somme: 1914–1916. Barnsley: Pen and Sword Military. ISBN 978-1844152698.
- Sheldon, J. (2008). The German Army on Vimy Ridge 1914–1917. Barnsley: Pen and Sword Military. ISBN 978-1844156801.
- Sheldon, J. (2007). The German Army at Passchendaele. Barnsley: Pen and Sword Military. ISBN 978-1844155644.
- Thomas, Nigel. The German Army in World War I (3 vol 2003) Excerpt and text search
- Watson, Alexander. Enduring the Great War: Combat, morale and collapse in the German and British armies, 1914–1918 (Cambridge UP, 2008)

=== Austria-Hungary ===
- Deak, John. "The Great War and the Forgotten Realm: The Habsburg Monarchy and the First World War," Journal of Modern History 86#2 (2014): 336–80. online, historiography
- Herwig, Holger H (1996). The First World War: Germany and Austria–Hungary 1914–1918. London: Arnold. ISBN 978-0340573488. OCLC 60154404.
- Hubatsch, Walther; Backus, Oswald P (1963). Germany and the Central Powers in the World War, 1914–1918. Lawrence, Kansas: University of Kansas. OCLC 250441891.
- Jung, Peter. The Austro-Hungarian Forces in World War I. 2 vol 2003) Excerpt
- Rauchensteiner, Manfried (2014). The First World War and the End of the Habsburg Monarchy, 1914–1918. Wien/Köln/Weimar: Böhlau Verlag. ISBN 978-3205795889.
- Schindler, J. "Steamrollered in Galicia: The Austro-Hungarian Army and the Brusilov Offensive, 1916." War in History 10#1 (2003), pp 27–59. doi:10.1191/0968344503wh260oa
- Sked, Alan. "Austria-Hungary and the First World War." Histoire Politique 1 (2014): 16–49. online historiography
- Tunstall, Graydon A. Austro-Hungarian Army and the First World War (Cambridge UP 2021) online review
- Watson, Alexander. Ring of Steel: Germany and Austria-Hungary at War, 1914–1918 (2014), excerpt
- Wawro, Geoffrey A Mad Catastrophe: The Outbreak of World War I and the Collapse of the Habsburg Empire (Hachette, 2014).
- Zametica, John. Folly and malice: the Habsburg empire, the Balkans and the start of World War One (London: Shepheard–Walwyn, 2017). 416pp.

=== Ottoman Empire ===
- Akın, Yiğit. When the War Came Home: The Ottomans' Great War and the Devastation of an Empire. (Stanford UP, 2018).
- Aksakal, Mustafa (2011). "'Holy War Made in Germany'? Ottoman Origins of the 1914 Jihad". War in History. 18 (2): 184–199. doi:10.1177/0968344510393596. S2CID 159652479.
- Aksakal, Mustafa (2008). The Ottoman Road to War in 1914: The Ottoman Empire and the First World War. Cambridge University Press. ISBN 978-1139474498.
- Bozarslan, Hamit. "The Ottoman Empire." in John Horne. ed. A Companion to World War I (2010): 494–507.
- Erickson, Edward J. Ordered to Die: A History of the Ottoman Army in the First World War (Bloomsbury Publishing, 2010).
- Gingeras, Ryan. Fall of the Sultanate: The Great War and the End of the Ottoman Empire, 1908–1922 (Oxford UP, 2016).
- Kayalı, Hasan (2017). "The Ottoman Experience of World War I: Historiographical Problems and Trends". Journal of Modern History. 89 (4): 875–907. doi:10.1086/694391. S2CID 148953435.
- Macfie, A. L. The End of the Ottoman Empire, 1908–1923 (1998).
- Penix, Matthew David. "The Ottoman Empire in the first world war: A rational disaster" ( MA thesis Eastern Michigan U. 2013)). online, bibliography pp 58–66
- Reynolds, Michael. Shattering Empires: the Clash and Collapse of the Ottoman and Russian Empires, 1908–1918 (Cambridge UP, 2011).
- Trumpener, Ulrich (1962). "Turkey's Entry into World War I: An Assessment of Responsibilities". Journal of Modern History. 34 (4): 369–80. doi:10.1086/239180. S2CID 153500703.

== Neutrals ==
- Abbenhuis, Maartje M. The art of staying neutral: the Netherlands in the First World War, 1914–1918 (Amsterdam University Press, 2006).
- Coogan, John W. The End of Neutrality: The United States, Britain, and Maritime Rights, 1899–1915. (Cornell University Press, 1981).
- Den Hertog, Johan, and Samuël Kruizinga, eds. Caught in the middle: neutrals, neutrality, and the First World War (Amsterdam University Press, 2011).
- Graham, Malbone W (1923). "Neutrality and the World War". American Journal of International Law. 17 (4): 704–723. doi:10.2307/2188658. JSTOR 2188658. S2CID 147004170.
- Jonas, Frank. Scandinavia and the Great Powers in the First World War (2019) online review
- Koblik, Steven. Neutral Europe between war and revolution, 1917–23 (University of Virginia Press, 1988).
- Rausch, Jane M. Colombia and World War I: The Experience of a Neutral Latin American Nation during the Great War and Its Aftermath, 1914–1921 (Lexington Books, 2014).
- Syrett, Harold C. "The Business Press and American Neutrality, 1914–1917." Mississippi Valley Historical Review 32.2 (1945): 215–230 online.
- Tames, Ismee (2012). "'War on our Minds' War, neutrality and identity in Dutch public debate during the First World War". First World War Studies. 3 (2): 201–216. doi:10.1080/19475020.2012.728741. hdl:20.500.11755/1db85e52-111b-4b12-94a8-b6a92444b077. S2CID 143688699.
- Tucker, Robert W. Woodrow Wilson and the Great War: reconsidering America's neutrality, 1914–1917 (U of Virginia Press, 2007).

== Homefronts ==
- Akın, Yiğit. When the War Came Home: The Ottomans' Great War and the Devastation of an Empire (Stanford University Press, 2018)
- Darrow, Margaret H., French Women and the First World War (Berg, 2000) ISBN 1859733611
- Gearóid Barry, Enrico Dal Lago, Róisín Healy. Small Nations and Colonial Peripheries in World War I (Brill, 2016) online review
- Grayzel, Susan, Women and the First World War (2002), worldwide coverage
- Healy, Maureen, Vienna and the Fall of the Habsburg Empire: Total War and Everyday Life in World War I (2004)
- Higham, Robin and Dennis E. Showalter, eds., Researching World War I: A Handbook (2003), 475 pp; highly detailed historiography, stressing military themes; annotates over 1000 books – mostly military but many on the homefront; ISBN 031328850X
- Horne, John N., ed. A Companion to World War I (2010), 38 essays by leading scholars covering all facets of the war excerpt and text search ISBN 978-1405123860 OCLC 458582914
- Horne, John N., State, Society and Mobilization in Europe during the First World War (1997, reissued in 2002) ISBN 0521522668 OCLC 166254060
- Kennedy, David M., Over Here: The First World War and American Society (1980, reissued in 2004) ISBN 0195027299
- Licursi, Kimberly J. Lamay. Remembering World War I in America (2018)
- Lutz, Ralph Haswell, ed. Fall of the German Empire, 1914–1918 (2 vol 1932). 868pp online review, primary sources
- Proctor, Tammy M., Civilians in a World at War, 1914–1918 (2010). 410pp; global coverage excerpt and text search ISBN 978-0814767153
- Rietzler, Katharina (2014). "The war as history: Writing the economic and social history of the First World War". Diplomatic History. 38 (4): 826–839. doi:10.1093/dh/dhu028.
- Stevenson, David, Cataclysm: The First World War as Political Tragedy (2005) 625 pp; excerpt and text search ISBN 0465081843
- Stevenson, David, With Our Backs to the Wall: Victory and Defeat in 1918 (2011) excerpt and text search covers both the homefront and the battlefields for the major powers ISBN 978-0674062269
- Strachan, Hew, The First World War (vol 1, 2005) 1225pp; covers the battlefields and chief home fronts in 1914–1917 excerpt and text search ISBN 0670032956
- Swift, David (2016). "The War Emergency: Workers' National Committee". History Workshop Journal. 81: 84–105. doi:10.1093/hwj/dbv041. S2CID 155699122.
- Swift, David. For Class and Country: the Patriotic Left and the First World War (2017)
- Tucker, Spencer, ed. European Powers in the First World War: An Encyclopedia (1999) excerpt and text search ISBN 0815303998
- Tucker, Spencer, ed. The Encyclopedia of World War I: A Political, Social, and Military History (5 vol 2005); the most detailed reference source; articles by specialists cover all aspects of the war ISBN 1851094253
  - Tucker, Spencer C., ed. World War I: A Student Encyclopedia. 4 vol. ABC-CLIO, 2006. 2454 pp.
- Wilson, Trevor, The Myriad Faces of War: Britain and the Great War 1914–1918 (1989) excerpt and text search
- Winter, J. M., The Experience of World War I (2006) excerpt and text search
- Winter, Jay, and Jean-Louis Robert, eds. Capital Cities at War: Paris, London, Berlin 1914–1919 (2 vol. 1999, 2007), 30 chapters 1200pp; comprehensive coverage by scholars vol 1 excerpt; vol 2 excerpt and text search ISBN 0521571715

=== Economics ===
- Bogart, E.L. Direct and Indirect Costs of the Great World War (2nd ed. 1920); comprehensive coverage of every major country;
- Broadberry, Stephen, and Mark Harrison, eds. The Economics of World War I (2005) ISBN 0521852129. Covers France, Britain, United States, Russia, Italy, Germany, Austria-Hungary, the Ottoman Empire, and the Netherlands, 362pp; excerpt and text search
- Ferguson, Niall The Pity of War (1999), cultural and economic themes
- Fisk, Harvey E., The Inter-Ally Debts: An Analysis of War and Post-War Public Finance, 1914–1923 (1924)
- Grayzel, Susan, Women and the First World War (2002), worldwide coverage
- Hardach, Gerd, The First World War 1914–1918 (1977), economic history of major powers
- Horn, Martin. Britain, France, and the Financing of the First World War (2002)
- Howard, N. P. "The Social and Political Consequences of the Allied Food Blockade of Germany, 1918–19," German History, April 1993, Vol. 11 Issue 2, pp 161–188
- Menderhausen, Horst, The Economics of War (1940) online
- Osborne, Eric, Britain's Economic Blockade of Germany, 1914–1919 (2004)
- Stevenson, David, With Our Backs to the Wall: Victory and Defeat in 1918 (2011) excerpt and text search, pp 350–438, covers major countries
- Strachan, Hew, Financing the First World War (2004) ISBN 0199257272, a full study of how the War was paid for
- Stubbs, Kevin D., Race to the Front: The Materiel Foundations of Coalition Strategy in the Great War (2002) ISBN 0275972992
- Shotwell, James T., Economic and Social History of the World War (1924)
- Thorp, William Long, Business Annals: United States, England, France, Germany, Austria, Russia, Sweden Netherlands, Italy, Argentina, Brazil, Canada, South Africa, Australia, India, Japan, China (1926) capsule summary of conditions in each country for each quarter-year 1790–1925
- Winter, J. M. The Experience of World War I (2nd ed 2005)

== Battles and campaigns ==
=== Western Front ===
- Ashworth, Tony (2000) [1980]. Trench warfare, 1914–18 : the live and let live system. London: Pan. ISBN 978-0330480680. OCLC 247360122.
- Coffman, Edward M (1998). The War to End All Wars: The American Military Experience in World War I. Lexington: University Press of Kentucky. ISBN 978-0813109558. OCLC 38842092.
- Esposito, Vincent J (1997). 1900–1918. The West Point Atlas of American Wars. Vol. II. New York: Henry Holt. ISBN 978-0805053050. OCLC 39644150. Archived from the original on 2007-01-02. despite the title covers entire war
- Falls, Cyril Bentham (1959). The Great War. New York: Putnam. ISBN 978-0399501005. OCLC 8664179. general military history
- Gilbert, Martin. The Somme: Heroism and Horror in the First World War (2007) excerpt and text search
- Harris, J. P. Douglas Haig and the First World War (2009) excerpt and text search
- Herwig, Holger H. Operation Michael: The "Last Card" (2001) German Spring Offensive in 1918
- Hemrick, Levi (2013). Once A Marine. Clarion Publishing. ISBN 978-0988714588.
- Horne, Alistair (1962). The Price of Glory: Verdun 1916 (Unabridged ed.). Macmillan. OCLC 2600805.
- Lengel, Edward G. To Conquer Hell: The Meuse-Argonne, 1918. The Epic Battle That Ended the First World War (2009) excerpt and text search
- Liddle, Peter, H. (2001). The 1916 Battle of the Somme: A Reappraisal. Hertfordshire: Wordsworth. ISBN 978-1840222401.
- Philpott, William (2009). Bloody Victory: The Sacrifice on the Somme and the Making of the Twentieth Century. London: Little, Brown. ISBN 978-1408701089.
- Prior, Robin and Wilson, Trevor (2005). The Somme. New Haven: Yale University Press. ISBN 978-0300106947.
- Sacco, Joe (2013). The Great War: July 1, 1916: The First Day of the Battle of the Somme: An Illustrated Panorama. W. W. Norton & Company. ISBN 978-0393088809.
- Tuchman, Barbara. The Guns of August, tells of the opening diplomatic and military manoeuvres.
- Uys, Ian (1983). Delville Wood. Johannesburg: Uys Publishers. ISBN 978-0620066112.
- Wolff, Leon. In Flanders Fields: The 1917 Campaign (1958)

=== Eastern Front ===
- Buttar, Prit (2014). Collision of Empires: The War on the Eastern Front in 1914. Oxford: Osprey Publishing. ISBN 978-1782006480.
- —— (2017). Germany Ascendant: The Eastern Front 1915. Oxford: Osprey Publishing. ISBN 978-1472819376.
- —— (2017). Russia's Last Gasp: The Eastern Front 1916–17. Oxford: Osprey Publishing. ISBN 978-1472824899.
- —— (2018). The Splintered Empires: The Eastern Front 1917–21. Oxford: Osprey Publishing. ISBN 978-1472829849.
- —— (2024). The Eastern Front: A History of the First World War. New York City: Viking Press. ISBN 978-0241506851.
- —— (1975). Eastern Front, 1914-17. London: Hodder & Stoughton. ISBN 978-0340128749.
- Tunstall, Graydon A. Austro-Hungarian Army and the First World War (Cambridge UP 2021) online review
- Lloyd, Nick (2024). The Eastern Front: A History of the Great War, 1914-1918. New York: Norton. ISBN 978-1324092711.

== Specialty military topics ==
=== Infantry and artillery ===
- Ashworth, Tony. Trench Warfare, 1914–1918: the live and let live system (Pan Macmillan, 2000)
- Bidwell, Shelford and Graham, Dominick. Firepower: British Army Weapons and Theories of War, 1904–1945 (1992)
- Engen, Rob. "Steel Against Fire: The Bayonet in the First World War." Journal of Military and Strategic Studies (2006) 8#3 Online
- Griffith, P (1996). Battle Tactics of the Western Front: The British Army's Art of Attack 1916–1918. London: Yale. ISBN 978-0300066630.
- Gudmundsson, Bruce I. Stormtroop Tactics: Innovation in the German Army, 1914–1918 (1989)
- Love, Albert G. War Casualties (1931) online statistics and how compiled for U.S. Army
- Lewis-Stempel, John. "Six Weeks: The Short and Gallant Life of the British Officer in the First World War" (2010) (ISBN 978-0297860068)
- Messenger, Charles. Call To Arms: The British Army 1914–1918 (2005) (ISBN 0297846957), recruitment, training, supplying of officers & men
- Sheffield, G. D. Leadership in the Trenches: Officer-Man Relations, Morale and Discipline in the British Army in the Era of the First World War (2000)
- Smith, Leonard V. Between Mutiny and Obedience. The Case of the French Fifth Infantry Division during World War I (1994)
- Snyder, Jack L (1984). Ideology of the Offensive. Ithaca: Cornell University Press. ISBN 978-0801416576.
- Weber, Thomas. Hitler's First War: Adolf Hitler, the Men of the List Regiment, and the First World War (2010)

=== Logistics ===
- van Creveld, Martin. "World War I and the revolution in logistics." In Roger Chickering and Stig Förster, eds. Great War, total war: combat and mobilization on the Western Front 1918 (2006): 57–72.
- Heywood, Anthony (2013). "Spark of Revolution? Railway Disorganisation, Freight Traffic and Tsarist Russia's War Effort, July 1914–March 1917". Europe-Asia Studies. 65 (4): 753–772. doi:10.1080/09668136.2013.767580. S2CID 153647419.
- Lloyd-Jones, Roger, and Myrddin John Lewis. Arming the Western Front: War, Business and the State in Britain 1900–1920 (Routledge, 2016).
- Pratt, Edwin A. The rise of rail-power in war and conquest, 1833–1914 (1915) online
- Stevenson, David (1999). "War by Timetable? The Railway Race before 1914". Past & Present (162): 163–194. doi:10.1093/past/162.1.163. JSTOR 651067.
- Tynan, Jane. British Army Uniform and the First World War (Palgrave Macmillan, 2013).

=== Intelligence, espionage ===
- Andrew, Christopher. For the President's Eyes Only: Secret Intelligence and the American Presidency from Washington to Bush (1996) pp 30–70.
- Barton, George. Celebrated Spies and Famous Mysteries of the Great War (1929) online
- Beesly, Patrick. Room 40 London: Hamish Hamilton, 1982. Covers the breaking of German codes by RN intelligence, Zimmermann telegram, and confusion at Jutland
- Boghardt, Thomas. Spies of the Kaiser: German Covert Operations in Great Britain during the First World War Era (2004).
- Boghardt, Thomas. The Zimmermann telegram: intelligence, diplomacy, and America's entry into World War I (2012).
- Dockrill, Michael. and David French, eds. Strategy and Intelligence: British Policy During the First World War (1996).
- Debruyne, Emmanuel. "Espionage" In: Ute Daniel, et al. eds. 1914–1918-online: International Encyclopedia of the First World War online 22 page scholarly history full text
- Finnegan, Terrance. "The Origins of Modern Intelligence, Surveillance, and Reconnaissance: Military Intelligence at the Front, 1914–18," Studies in Intelligence 53#4 (2009) pp. 25–40.
- Foley, Robert T. "Easy Target or Invincible Enemy? German Intelligence Assessments of France Before the Great War." Journal of Intelligence History 5#2 (2005): 1–24.
- Khan, David. The Codebreakers (1996). Covers the breaking of Russian codes
- Kahn, David. "Codebreaking in World Wars I and II: The Major Successes and Failures, Their Causes and Their Effects", Historical Journal 23#3 (1980) pp. 617–39.
- Khan, David. The Reader of Gentlemen's Mail: Herbert O. Yardley and the Birth of American Codebreaking (2004)
- Larsen, Daniel. "Intelligence in the First World War: The state of the field." Intelligence and National Security 29.2 (2014): 282–302, comprehensive overview
- Larsen, Daniel. "British codebreaking and American diplomatic telegrams, 1914–1915." Intelligence and National Security 32.2 (2017): 256–263. The British read the American secrets from late 1915 online
- May, Ernest R. ed. Knowing One's Enemy: Intelligence Assessment Before the two World Wars (1984)
- Parr, Edward. "Kingdoms Fall: The Laxenburg Message" (2013). Fact-based fictional account of Secret Intelligence Service agents during World War I, including Suvla Bay landing, Salonika landing, Battle of Verdun. First of a trilogy.
- Pöhlmann, Markus (2005). "German Intelligence at War, 1914–1918". Journal of Intelligence History. 5 (2): 25–54. doi:10.1080/16161262.2005.10555116. S2CID 155389900.
- Porch, Douglas. The French Secret Services: A History of French Intelligence from the Dreyfus Affair to the Gulf War (2003). excerpt; also online review, pp 49–114.
- Seligmann, Matthew (2006). Spies in Uniform: British Military and Naval Intelligence on the Eve of the First World War. Oxford: Oxford University Press. ISBN 978-0199261505
- Trumpener, Ulrich. "War Premeditated? German Intelligence Operations in July 1914," Central European History 9#1 (1976): 58–85
- Tuchman, Barbara W. The Zimmermann Telegram (1966)
- Witcover, Jules. Sabotage at Black Tom: Imperial Germany's Secret War in America, 1914–1917 (1989)

=== Medicine ===
- Alberti, S. J. M. M. (2015). "The 'Regiment of Skeletons': A First World War Medical Collection". Social History of Medicine. 28: 108–133. doi:10.1093/shm/hku038.
- Carden-Coyne, Ana. The Politics of Wounds: Military Patients and Medical Power in the First World War (Oxford University Press, 2014), from the patients' perspective
- Grant, Susan-Mary. "On the Field of Mercy: Women Medical Volunteers from the Civil War to the First World War." American Nineteenth Century History (2012) 13#2 pp: 276–278. on US
- Haller Jr., John S. "Treatment of infected wounds during the Great War, 1914 to 1918." Southern medical journal (1992) 85#3 pp: 303–315.
- Harrison, Mark. The medical war: British military medicine in the First World War (Oxford University Press, 2010)
- Jones, Edgar, and Simon Wessely. Shell shock to PTSD: Military psychiatry from 1900 to the Gulf War (Psychology Press, 2005)
- Jones, Edgar. "Terror weapons: the British experience of gas and its treatment in the first world war." War in History (2014) 21#3 pp: 355–375.
- Kaufmann, Doris (1999). "Science as Cultural Practice: Psychiatry in the First World War and Weimar Germany". Journal of Contemporary History. 34 (1): 125–144. doi:10.1177/002200949903400107. hdl:11858/00-001M-0000-002A-743A-5. JSTOR 261197. PMID 21980645. S2CID 19823960.
- Leneman, Leah (1994). "Medical women at war, 1914–1918". Medical History. 38 (2): 160–177. doi:10.1017/S0025727300059081. PMC 1036842. PMID 8007751.
- Loughran, Tracey. "Shell shock, trauma, and the First World War: the making of a diagnosis and its histories." Journal of the History of Medicine and Allied Sciences (2012) 67#1 pp: 94–119.
- Mitchell, Thomas John, and G. M. Smith. Medical services, casualties and medical statistics of the great war (London: HM Stationery Office, 1931)
- Phillips, Howard (2010). "The re-appearing shadow of 1918: trends in the historiography of the 1918–19 influenza pandemic". Canadian Bulletin of Medical History. 21 (1): 121–134. doi:10.3138/cbmh.21.1.121. PMID 15202430.
- Rees, Peter. The Other ANZACs (2008)
- Wiedermann, Christian J, Patrick Rina, and Hannes Obermair. "An imperial-royal first aid rescue kit in Austria’s high-mountain warfare 1914–1918: antisepsis, antivenin, and water hygiene." Wiener Medizinische Wochenschrift (wmw) 175 (Dec 2025). doi:10.1007/s10354-025-01124-5.
- Yanıkdağ, Yücel. Healing the Nation: Prisoners of War, Medicine and Nationalism in Turkey, 1914–1939 (2013)

== Weapons ==
=== Air War ===
- Angelucci, Enzo, Matricardi, Paolo. World Aircraft: Origins – World War I (1979). ISBN 0528881655.
- Bennett, Leon. Three Wings for the Red Baron: Von Richthofen, Strategy, Tactics, and Airplanes (2001). ISBN 1572492139. 248 pgs.
- Bickers, Richard Townshend. The First Great Air War (1989). ISBN 0340508248. 277 pgs.
- Boelcke, Oswald, An Aviators Field Book,1914–1916 (1991) ISBN 978-0898391633 pgs.
- Chajkowsky, William E. Royal Flying Corps, Bordon to Texas to Beamsville (1979) Boston Mills Press, ISBN 0919822231.
- Bowyer, Chaz. Royal Flying Corps Communiques: 1917–1918 (1998). ISBN 1898697795. 258 pgs.
- Chickering, Roger, et al. eds. Great War, Total War: Combat and Mobilization on the Western Front, 1914–1918 (Publications of the German Historical Institute) (2000). ISBN 0521773520. 584 pgs.
- Clark, Alan. Aces high: The war in the air over the Western Front 1914–18 (1973). ISBN 0297994646. 191 pgs.
- Cooke, James J. The U.S. Air Service In the Great War: 1917–1919 (1996). ISBN 0275948625. 272 pgs.
- Cormack, Andrew, Peter Cormack. British Air Forces (1): 1914–1918 (Men-At-Arms Series, 341) (2000). Osprey Publishing (UK). ISBN 1841760013. 48 pgs.
- Cowin, Hugh W. Allied Aviation of World War I: A Pictorial History of Allied Aviators and Aircraft of the Great War (2000). Osprey Aviation. ISBN 1841762261. 112 pgs.
- Cowin, Hugh W. German and Austrian Aviation of World War I: A Pictorial Chronicle of the Airmen and Aircraft That Forged German Airpower (2000). Osprey Pub Co. ISBN 1841760692. 96 pgs.
- Cross, Wilbur (1991). Zeppelins of World War I. Paragon House. ISBN 978-1557783820.
- Cuneo, John R. Winged Mars (2 Volumes) (1942). The Military Service Publishing Company. 338 pgs.
- Diggens, Barry. September Evening: The Life and Final Combat of the German World War One Ace Werner Voss (2003). Grub Street. ISBN 1904010474. 192 pgs.
- Dodds, Ronald. The Brave Young Wings (1980). Canada's Wings, Inc., Stittsville, Ontario, Canada. ISBN 0920002080. 302 pgs.
- Editors, Time Life, Ezra Bowen. Knights of the Air (Epic of Flight) (1980). Warner Books Inc. ISBN 0809432528. 192 pgs.
- Frandsen, Bert. Hat in the Ring: The Birth of American Air Power in the Great War (2003). Smithsonian Books. ISBN 158834150X. 320 pgs.
- Franks, Norman L. R., Frank W. Bailey, and Russell Guest. Above the Lines: The Aces and Fighter Units of the German Air Service, Naval Air Service and Flanders Marine Corps 1914–1918 (1994). Grub Street ISBN 0948817739. 259 pgs.
- Franks, Norman L. R., Guest, Russell, and Alegi, Gregory. Above the War Fronts: The British Two-Seater Bomber Pilot and Observer Aces, the British Two-Seater Fighter Observer Aces, and the Belgian, Italian, Austro-Hungarian and Russian Fighter Aces 1914–1918 (1997). Grub Street (ISBN 1898697566). 218 pgs.
- Franks, Norman L.R., Bailey, Frank W. Over the Front: A Complete Record of the Fighter Aces and Units of the United States and French Air Services, 1914–1918 (1992). Casemate Pub (ISBN 0948817542)
- Franks, Norman L.R., Guest, Russell, Bailey, Frank W. Bloody April...Black September (1995). Grub Street (ISBN 1898697086). 314 pgs.
- Franks, Norman, Bailey, Frank, Bailey, Frank W. The Storks: The Story of the Les Cigognes, France's Elite Fighter Group of Wwi (1998). Grub Street (ISBN 1898697817). 160 pgs.
- Franks, Norman, Giblin, Hal. Under the Guns of the Kaiser's Aces: Bohme, Muller, Von Tutschek, Wolff : The Complete Record of Their Victories and Victims (2003). Grub Street (ISBN 1904010024). 192 pgs.
- Franks, Norman, Wyngarden, Greg Van, Holmes, Tony. Fokker Dr I Aces of World War I (Osprey Aircraft of the Aces No 40) (2001). Osprey Aviation (ISBN 1841762237). 96 pgs.
- Franks, Norman. Jasta Boelcke: The History of Jasta 2, 1916–1918 (2004). Grub Street (ISBN 1904010768). 224 pgs.
- Franks, Norman. Sopwith Camel Aces of World War 1 (Aircraft of the Aces, 52) (2003). Osprey Publishing (UK) (ISBN 1841765341). 96 pgs.
- Gibbons, Floyd. Red Knight of Germany: The Story of Baron Von Richthofen, Germany's Great War Bird (1927, 1979). Arno Press (ISBN 0405121679). 383 pgs.
- Grinnel-Milne, Duncan. Wind in the Wires (1968) Doubleday Publishing (ISBN Not given). 259 pages with illus.
- Grosz, Peter, Haddow, George, Schiemer, Peter. Austro-Hungarian Army Aircraft of World War I (2002). Flying Machines Press (ISBN 1891268058). 544 pgs.
- Guttman, Jon, and Tony Holmes. SPA124 Lafayette Escadrille: American Volunteer Airmen in World War 1 (Aviation Elite Units, 17) (2004). Osprey Publishing (UK) (ISBN 1841767522). 128 pgs.
- Guttman, Jon. Spad VII Aces of World War I (Osprey Aircraft of the Aces No 39) (2001). Osprey Aviation (ISBN 1841762229). 96 pgs.
- Hepplewhite, Peter. World War I: In The Air (2003). Pan Macmillan (ISBN 0330410113). 144 pgs.
- Herris, Jack. Pfalz Aircraft of World War I (Great War Aircraft in Profile, Volume 4) (2001). Flying Machines Press (ISBN 1891268155). 184 pgs.
- Holley, I. B. Ideas and Weapons: Exploitation of the Aerial Weapon by the United States During World War I(1983)
- Hudson, James J. Hostile Skies (1997). Syracuse University Press (ISBN 0815604653). 338 pgs.
- Hurley, Alfred F. Billy Mitchell, Crusader for Air Power (1975)
- Immelmann, Franz. Immelmann, The Eagle Of Lille (1990) ISBN 978-0947898007. 240 pgs.
- Jeffers, H. Paul. Ace of Aces: The Life of Captain Eddie Rickenbacker (2003). Presidio Press (ISBN 0891417915). 352 pgs.
- Johnson, Herbert A. Wingless Eagle: U.S. Army Aviation Through World War I (2001). University of North Carolina Press (ISBN 0807826278). 298 pgs.
- Kennett, Lee. First Air War, 1914–1918 (1999). Free Press (ISBN 0684871203). 288 pgs.
- Lewis, Cecil. "Sagittarius Rising", 1936 Greenhill Books, 332 pages, ISBN 1853675598
- Lawson, Eric and Jane Lawson. The First Air Campaign, August 1914–November 1918 (1996)
- Leaman, Paul. Fokker Dr.I Triplane: A World War One Legend (2003). Classic Publications (ISBN 1903223288). 224 pgs.
- McKee, Alexander. The Friendless Sky (1984). Academy Chicago Publishers (ISBN 0586058230). 256 pgs.
- Morrow, John. German Air Power in World War I. Lincoln: University of Nebraska Press, 1982. Contains design and production figures, as well as economic influences.
- Morrow, John H. Jr. The Great War in the Air (1993). Smithsonian Books (ISBN 1560982381). 464 pgs.
- O'Connor, Martin. Air Aces of the Austro-Hungarian Empire, 1914–1918 (1986). Flying Machines Press (ISBN 1891268066). 338 pgs.
- O'Connor, Mike. Airfields & Airmen: Cambrai (Battleground Europe) (2003). Pen & Sword Books (ISBN 0850529581). 176 pgs.
- Outlet, Bernard Fitzsimons (Editor) /. Warplanes & Air Battles Of World War I (1973, 1988). Beekman House / Crescent (ISBN 0517130890). 160 pgs.
- Owers, Colin. De Havilland Aircraft of World War I: Volume 1, D.H.1–D.H.4 (Great War Aircraft in Profile, Volume 5) (2001). Flying Machines Press (ISBN 1891268171). 88 pgs.
- Revell, Alex. Victoria Cross WW I: WWI Airmen and Their Aircraft (1997). Flying Machines Press (ISBN 1891268007). 96 pgs.
- Richthofen, Manfred Von, Franks, Norman. The Red Air Fighter (1999). Stackpole Books (ISBN 1853673625). 192 pgs.
- Rickenbacker, Eddie V. Fighting the Flying Circus: The Greatest True Air Adventure to Come Out of World War I (2001). Doubleday Books (ISBN 0385505590). 324 pgs.
- Shores, Christopher, Rolfe, Mark. British and Empire Aces of World War I (Osprey Aircraft of the Aces No 45) (2001). Osprey Publishing (UK) (ISBN 1841763772). 96 pgs.
- Simkins, Peter. Air Fighting 1914–1918 (The Struggle for Air Superiority over the Western Front) (1978). Imperial War Museum. 80 pgs.
- Smith, Adrian. Mick Mannock, Fighter Pilot: Myth, Life and Politics (Studies in Military and Strategic History) (2001). Palgrave MacMillan (ISBN 0333778987). 211 pgs.
- Staff, Vigilant, Sykes, Claud W., Franks, Norman. German War Birds (1994). Greenhill Books (ISBN 1853671649). 288 pgs.
- Treadwell, Terry C. America's First Air War (2000). MBI Publishing (ISBN 0760309868). 176 pgs.
- Vanwyngarden, Greg. Richthofen's Flying Circus: Jagdgeschwader Nr 1 (Aviation Elite Units, 16) (2004). Osprey Publishing (UK) (ISBN 1841767263). 128 pgs.
- Winter, Denis. First of the Few. London: Allen Lane/Penguin, 1982. Coverage of the British air war, with extensive bibliographical notes.
- Wise, S.F. Canadian Airmen and the First World War: The Official History of the Royal Canadian Air Force, Vol. 1, (1980). University of Toronto Press, ISBN 0802023797.
- Wood, Alan C. Aces and Airmen of WW1 (2002). Brassey's Inc. ISBN 1857533801. 176 pgs.

=== Gas ===
- Haber, L. F. The Poisonous Cloud: Chemical Warfare in the First World War (1986).
- Palazzo, Albert. Seeking Victory on the Western Front: The British Army and Chemical Warfare in World War I (2000).
- Richter, Donald. Chemical Soldiers: British Gas Warfare in World War I (1992).
- Freemantle, Michael. Gas! Gas! Quick, Boys! How Chemistry Changed the First World War (2012).

=== Naval war ===
- Allard, Dean C. "Anglo-American Naval Differences During World War I." Military Affairs: Journal of Military History (1980): 75–81
- Bennett, Geoffrey. Naval Battles of the First World War (Pen and Sword, 2014)
- Coogan, John W. The End of Neutrality: The United States, Britain and Maritime Rights, 1899–1915 (Cornell University Press, 1981)
- Farquharson-Roberts, Mike. A History of the Royal Navy: World War I (IB Tauris, 2014)
- Goldrick, James. The Kingś Ships Were at Sea: The War in the North Sea, August 1914–February 1915 (US Naval Institute Press, 1984)
- Grimes, Shawn T. Strategy and War Planning in the British Navy, 1887–1918 (Boydell Press, 2012)
- Halpern, Paul G. The War at Sea (Wiley-Blackwell, 1998)
- Halpern, Paul G. The Mediterranean naval situation, 1908–1914 (Harvard UP, 1971)
- Holloway, S. M. From Trench and Turret: Royal Marines' Letters and Diaries 1914–18 (Constable, 2006), primary sources
- Hough, Richard. The Great War at Sea, 1914–1918 (Oxford UP, 1987)
- Kirschbaum, Joseph W. The 1916 Naval Expansion Act: Planning for a Navy Second to None (ProQuest, 2008). US Navy
- London, Charles. Jutland 1916: clash of the dreadnoughts (Osprey, 2000)
- MacGregor, David. "The Use, Misuse, and Non-Use of History: The Royal Navy and the Operational Lessons of the First World War." Journal of Military History (1992): 603–616
- Marder, Arthur Jacob. From the Dreadnought to Scapa Flow (4 vol. 1961–70), covers Royal Navy 1904–1919
- O'Hara, V. P.; Heinz, L. R. (2017). Clash of fleets: Naval battles of the Great War, 1914–18. Naval Institute Press. online review
- Osborne, Eric W. Britain's economic blockade of Germany, 1914–1919 (Routledge, 2004)
- Peebles, Hugh B. Warshipbuilding on the Clyde: Naval orders and the prosperity of the Clyde shipbuilding industry, 1889–1939 (John Donald, 1987)
- Sondhaus, Lawrence. The Great War at Sea: A Naval History of the First World War (Cambridge University Press, 2014) 417 pp. Online review and summary
- Trask, David F. Captains & cabinets: Anglo-American naval relations, 1917–1918 (University of Missouri Press, 1972)
- Woodward, Ernest Llewellyn. Great Britain and the German navy (1935)
- The Royal Navy in the First World War

==== Naval aviation ====
- Benbow, Tim, ed. British naval aviation: the first 100 years (Ashgate, 2013)
- Ingalls, David S. Hero of the Angry Sky: The World War I Diary and Letters of David S. Ingalls, America's First Naval Ace (Ohio University Press, 2013)
- Layman, R. D. Naval Aviation in the First World War: Its Impact and Influence (Naval Institute Press, 1996)
- Till, Geoffrey. Air Power and the Royal Navy, 1914–1945: a historical survey (Macdonald and Jane's, 1979)

==== Submarines ====
- Abbatiello, John. Anti-Submarine Warfare in World War I: British Naval Aviation and the Defeat of the U-Boats (2005)
- Compton-Hall, Richard. Submarines and the War at Sea, 1914–18 (Macmillan, 1991)
- Gray, Edwyn A. The U-Boat War, 1914–1918 (1994)
- Greentree, David, Ian Palmer, and Peter Dennis. Q Ship Vs U-Boat: 1914–18 (Osprey, 2014)
- Hackmann, Willem Dirk. Seek & Strike: Sonar, anti-submarine warfare and the Royal Navy 1914–54 (Unipub, 1984)
- Henry, Chris. Depth Charge! Mines, Depth Charges and Underwater Weapons, 1914–1945 (Casemate Publishers, 2005)
- van der Vat, Dan. The Atlantic Campaign. (1988). Connects submarine and antisubmarine operations between wars, and suggests a continuous war.
- Price, Alfred, Dr. Aircraft versus the Submarine. Deals with technical developments, including the first dipping hydrophones.
- Thomas, Lowell. Raiders Of The Deep (1928, 2004)

=== Tanks ===
- Elson, Aaron. The Armored Fist: The 712th Tank Battalion in the Second World War (Fonthill Media, 2014) ISBN 978-1781550915
- Foley, Michael. Rise of the Tank: Armoured Vehicles and their use in the First World War (Pen and Sword, 2014) ISBN 978-1783463930
- Fuller, J.F.C. Tanks in the Great War (1920)
- Guderian, Heinz. Achtung! Panzer (1937)
- Hammond, Christopher Brynley. The Theory and Practice of British Tank Warfare on the Western Front During the First World War (Ashgate, 2013) ISBN 978-1409431718
- Smithers, A J (1986). A New Excalibur; The Development of the Tank, 1909–1939. Leo Cooper. ISBN 978-0436475207. OCLC 246675397.
- Wilson, Dale E. Treat 'Em Rough! The Birth of American Armor, 1917–20 (1989) ISBN 978-0891413547

== Popular histories and documentaries ==
- Taylor, A. J. P. The First World War: An Illustrated History, Hamish Hamilton, 1963
- Editors of American Heritage. History of WWI. Simon & Schuster, 1964. popular
- Strachan, Hew ed. The Oxford Illustrated History of the First World War, a collection of chapters from various scholars
- Toland, John. No Man's Land. 1918 – The Last Year of the Great War (1980)
- The Great War, television documentary by the BBC.
- The Great War, documentary film which aired on PBS as part of the series American Experience

== Cultural, literary, artistic memorials ==
- Cruickshank, John. Variations on Catastrophe: Some French Responses to the Great War (1982) ISBN 0192125990
- Eksteins, Modris. Rites of Spring: The Great War and the Birth of the Modern Age (1989, reissued in 2000). ISBN 0395937582
- Fussell, Paul (1975). The Great War and Modern Memory. New York: Oxford University Press. p. 363 p. ISBN 978-0195019186., classic study of WWI literature
- Bairnsfather, Bruce. Bullets & Billets (1916) . Cartoons.
- Genno, C.N. and H. Wetzel, eds. The First World War in German Narrative Prose (1980).
- Hynes, Samuel. A War Imagined: The First World War in English Culture (1987) ISBN 0689121288
- Isenberg, Michael Thomas (1981). War on Film: The American Cinema and World War I, 1914–1941. Fairleigh Dickinson University Press. ISBN 978-0838620045. OCLC 5726236.
- James, Pearl, The New Death: American Modernism and World War I (University of Virginia Press; 2013) ISBN 978-0813934075; 272 pages; responses to war by Willa Cather, William Faulkner, F. Scott Fitzgerald, and Ernest Hemingway.
- Mosse, George L. Fallen Soldiers: Reshaping the Memory of the World Wars (1991) ISBN 0195071395
- Parfitt, George. Fiction of the First World War: A Study (London: Faber 1990) ISBN 0571148964
- Raitt, Suzanne and Trudi Tateeds. Women's Fiction and the Great War (Clarendon Press, 1997) ISBN 019818283X
- Robb, George. British Culture And The First World War (2002) ISBN 0333715713
- Roshwald, Aviel Roshwald. European Culture in the Great War : The Arts, Entertainment and Propaganda, 1914–1918 (2002) ISBN 0521570158
- Silkin, Jon, ed. (1996). The Penguin Book of First World War Poetry (2nd ed.). New York: Penguin. ISBN 978-0141180090. OCLC 37105631.
- Sherry, Vincent. The Cambridge Companion to the Literature of the First World War (2005) ISBN 0521821452
- Stallworthy, Jon. Great Poets of World War I: Poetry from the Great War (2002) ISBN 0786710985
- Vance, Jonathan F. Death So Noble: Memory, Meaning, and the First World War (1997) ISBN 077480601X
- Verhey, Jeffrey. The Spirit of 1914: Militarism, Myth and Mobilization in Germany (2000) ISBN 0521771374
- Viney, Nigel. Images of Wartime: British Art and Artists of World War I (1991) ISBN 0715397907
- Watson, Janet S. K. Fighting Different Wars: Experience, Memory, and the First World War in Britain (2004) ISBN 0521831539
- Winter, Jay. Sites of Memory, Sites of Mourning: The Great War in European Cultural History (1995, reissued in 1998) ISBN 0521639883

=== Propaganda and media ===
- Adams M.C.C. The Great Adventure: Male desire and the coming of World War I (1990)
- Bruntz. Allied Propaganda and the collapse of the German Empire in 1918 (1938)
- Buitenhuis, P. The Great war of Words: Literature as Propaganda, 1914–18 and After (1989)
- Carruth, Joseph (1997). "World War I Propaganda and Its Effects in Arkansas". The Arkansas Historical Quarterly. 56 (4): 385–398. doi:10.2307/40027887. JSTOR 40027887.
- Chambers, John Whiteclay. "'All Quiet on the Western Front' (1930): the antiwar film and the image of the First World War." Historical journal of film, radio and television 14.4 (1994): 377–411.
- Cole, Robert, ed. The Encyclopedia of Propaganda (3 vols. Sharpe Reference, 1998)
- Cornwall, Mark. "News, Rumour and the Control of Information in Austria-Hungary, 1914–1918." History 77#249 (1992): 50–64.
- Cornwall, Mark. The undermining of Austria-Hungary: the battle for hearts and minds (2000)
- Collins, Ross F. Children, War and Propaganda (Peter Lang, 2011)
- Creel, George (1941). "Propaganda and Morale". American Journal of Sociology. 47 (3): 340–351. doi:10.1086/218914. JSTOR 2769284. S2CID 143623232. Analysis by the head of American propaganda in the First World War
- Demm, Eberhard. Censorship and Propaganda in World War I: A Comprehensive History (Bloomsbury Academic, 2019) online review
- German, Kathleen. Promises of Citizenship: Film Recruitment of African Americans in World War II (Univ. Press of Mississippi, 2017).
- Green, Leanne (2014). "Advertising war: Picturing Belgium in First World War publicity". Media, War & Conflict. 7 (3): 309–325. doi:10.1177/1750635214557534. S2CID 144471627.
- Gullace, Nicoletta F. "Allied Propaganda and World War I: Interwar Legacies, Media Studies, and the Politics of War Guilt." History Compass (2011) 9#9 pp: 686–700.
- Haste, Cate. Keep the home fires burning: Propaganda in the First World War (Lane, Allen, 1977), On Britain
- Isenberg, Michael T. War on Film: The American Cinema and World War I, 1914–1941 (1981).
- Horne, John; Kramer, Alan (1994). "German "Atrocities" and Franco-German Opinion, 1914: The Evidence of German Soldiers' Diaries". The Journal of Modern History. 66 (1): 1–33. doi:10.1086/244776. JSTOR 2124390. S2CID 154171062.
- Johnson, Niel M. George Sylvester Viereck, German-American Propagandist (University of Illinois Press, 1972), in World War I
- Kingsbury, Celia Malone. For Home and Country: World War I Propaganda on the Home Front (University of Nebraska Press; 2010; 308 pages). Describes propaganda directed toward the homes of the American homefront in everything from cookbooks and popular magazines to children's toys.
- Lasswell, Harold D. Propaganda Technique in the World War. (1927), A famous classic
- Lutz, Ralph Haswell (1933). "Studies of World War Propaganda, 1914–33". The Journal of Modern History. 5 (4): 496–516. doi:10.1086/236062. JSTOR 1872083. S2CID 153973669.
- Marquis, Alice Goldfarb (1978). "Words as Weapons: Propaganda in Britain and Germany during the First World War". Journal of Contemporary History. 13 (3): 467–498. doi:10.1177/002200947801300304. JSTOR 260205. S2CID 159994121.
- Monger, David. Patriotism and Propaganda in First World War Britain: The National War Aims Committee and Civilian Morale (2013)
- Paddock, Troy. A Call to Arms: Propaganda, Public Opinion, and Newspapers in the Great War (2004)
- Peterson, Horace Cornelius. Propaganda for war: The campaign against American neutrality, 1914–1917 (University of Oklahoma Press, 1939), on the operations of private organizations.
- Ponsonby, Arthur. Falsehood in War-Time; Containing an Assortment of Lies circulated throughout the Nations during the Great War (London: Allen & Unwin, 1928)
- Roshwald, Aviel Roshwald . European Culture in the Great War : The Arts, Entertainment and Propaganda, 1914–1918 (2002)
- Sanders, Michael, and Philip M. Taylor. British Propaganda During the First World War, 1914–18 (Macmillan, 1982)
- Scott, Jonathan French. Five Weeks: The Surge of Public Opinion on the Eve of the Great War (1927)
- Squires, James Duane. British Propaganda at Home and in the United States from 1914 to 1917 (Harvard University Press, 1935)
- Thompson, J. Lee. Politicians, the Press, & Propaganda: Lord Northcliffe & the Great War, 1914–1919 (Kent State University Press, 1999)
- Welch, David. Germany and Propaganda in World War I: Pacifism, Mobilization and Total War (2014)
- Wood, Richard, and David Culbert, Film and Propaganda in America: A Documentary History: World War I – Vol. 1 (1990)

==== Posters ====
- Christopher, John, ed. British Posters of the First World War (2016)
- Darracott, Joseph, and Belinda Loftus, eds. The First World War Posters (1974)
- Dover. Posters of World Wars I and II CD-ROM and Book (2005) 120 American posters from WWI; ISBN 978-0486996844
- Rawls, Walton and Maurice Rickards, eds. Wake Up, America. World War I and the American Poster (2001) many color posters
- Rickards, Maurice ed. Posters of the First World War (1968)
- Stanley, Peter, ed. What Did You Do in the War, Daddy? A visual history of propaganda posters (1984)
- White, Edward J. ed. World War I Posters: 100th Anniversary Collectors Edition (2014)

=== Poetry and songs ===
- George Walter, The Penguin Book of First World War Poetry (2006)
- On Receiving News of the War, (1914) poem by Isaac Rosenberg
- In Flanders Fields, (1915) poem by John McCrae
- Anthem for Doomed Youth, (1917) poem by Wilfred Owen
- Dulce et Decorum Est, (1917) poem by Wilfred Owen
- Disabled,(1917) poem by Wilfred Owen
- Base details,(1918) poem by Siegfried Sassoon
- They, (1918) poem by Siegfried Sassoon
- And the Band Played Waltzing Matilda, (1972) song by Eric Bogle
- Over There, (1917) theme song of the war by George M. Cohan

=== Fiction and autobiographical prose ===
- Le Feu (Under Fire) (1916), novel by Henri Barbusse
- Mr. Britling Sees It Through (1916), novel by H.G. Wells
- The Worn Doorstep (1916), novel by Margaret Sherwood
- Told in a French Garden, August 1914 (1916), novel by Mildred Aldrich
- The Marne (1918), novel by Edith Wharton
- Home Fires in France (1918), fictional sketches by Dorothy Canfield
- The Return of the Soldier (1918), novel by Rebecca West
- Rilla of Ingleside (1920), novel by L.M. Montgomery, an account of the war as experienced by Canadian women of the time
- Storm of Steel, autobiography of Ernst Jünger. First published 1920 and revised several times through 1961
- A World to Mend (1920), novel by Margaret Sherwood
- Three Soldiers (1921), novel by John Dos Passos
- The Enormous Room (1922), novel by E.E. Cummings
- Pădurea Spânzuraţilor/Forest of the Hanged (1922), a novel by Romanian writer Liviu Rebreanu about the drama of the Romanian ethnics from Transylvania who were forced to fight against Romania. The author's brother, Emil Rebreanu, was hanged in 1917 by the Austro-Hungarian army for desertion.
- One of Ours (1922), novel by Willa Cather
- Seven Pillars of Wisdom (1922) by T. E. Lawrence
- The Good Soldier Švejk (1923), satirical novel by Jaroslav Hašek
- A Son at the Front (1923), novel by Edith Wharton
- Parade's End (1924–1928), four-part novel (Some Do Not ..., No More Parades, A Man Could Stand Up, The Last Post) by Ford Madox Ford
- Private 12768: Memoir of a Tommy (1926, first published 2005), memoir by John Jackson, ISBN 978-0752431840
- A Farewell to Arms (1929), novel by Ernest Hemingway
- All Quiet on the Western Front (1929), novel written by Erich Maria Remarque
- Death of a Hero (1929), novel by Richard Aldington
- Good-Bye to All That (1929), autobiography of Robert Graves
- The Middle Parts of Fortune (1929, 1977), a novel by Frederic Manning
- A Subaltern's War (1929), a novel by Charles Edmund Carrington
- The Wet Flanders Plain (1929), a novel by Henry Williamson
- Her Privates We (1930, 1999), a novel by Frederic Manning
- Generals Die in Bed (1930), novel by Charles Yale Harrison
- Memoirs of an Infantry Officer (1930), novel by Siegfried Sassoon
- The Patriot's Progress (1930), a novel by Henry Williamson
- Testament of Youth (1933), memoir by Vera Brittain
- Winged Victory (1934), a novel by V. M. Yeates
- God's Sparrows (1937), a novel by Philip Child
- Un anno sull'altipiano (A Year on the Plateau) (1938), novel by Emilio Lussu
- World's End (1940), first novel in Upton Sinclair's Pulitzer Prize winning Lanny Budd series
- Chronicles of Ancient Sunlight (1951–1969), a series of novels by Henry Williamson
- The Bartholomew Bandy novels (1962, 1973–76) (Three Cheers for Me!, That's Me in the Middle and It's Me Again) by Donald Jack.
- The Wars (1977), novel by Timothy Findley
- The Otto Prohaska Novels (1991–1994) (A Sailor of Austria, The Emperor's Coloured Coat, The Two-Headed Eagle and Tomorrow the World), novels by John Biggins
- Regeneration (1991), The Eye in the Door, 1993; The Ghost Road novels by Pat Barker
- Birdsong (1993), novel by Sebastian Faulks
- Deafening (2003), book written by Frances Itani
- No Graves As Yet (2003), first volume of a trilogy of novels by Anne Perry
- A Long, Long Way (2005), novel by Sebastian Barry
- Three Day Road (2005) novel by Joseph Boyden about northern Ontario Cree, in the Canadian Second Division, on the front line.
- To the Last Man (2005), novel by Jeff Shaara
- A Young Man's War (2008), letters from the Front by Alec Ward
- Kingdoms Fall: The Laxenburg Message (2013) ISBN 978-1484905531, a novel by Edward Parr

=== Films, plays, television series and mini-series ===
- The Four Horsemen of the Apocalypse (1921), movie directed by Rex Ingram, based on a novel by Vicente Blasco Ibáñez
- The Big Parade (1925), movie directed by King Vidor, adapted by Harry Behn from the play by Joseph Farnham and the autobiographical novel Plumes by Laurence Stallings.
- Mare Nostrum (1926), movie directed by Rex Ingram, based on a novel by Vicente Blasco Ibáñez
- Wings (1927), directed by William A. Wellman tells the story about two fighter pilots. The film is one of only two silent movie to win the Academy Oscar for Best Picture.
- Journey's End (1928), play written by R. C. Sherriff
- All Quiet on the Western Front (1930), movie directed by Lewis Milestone, based on the novel by Erich Maria Remarque (1929).
- Hell's Angels (1930), movie directed by Howard Hughes.
- War Nurse (1930), movie directed by Edgar Selwyn.
- Westfront 1918 (1930), German-language movie directed by Georg Wilhelm Pabst. Later banned under the Nazi regime.
- Grand Illusion (1937), directed by Jean Renoir
- Sergeant York (1941), movie directed by Howard Hawks
- Yankee Doodle Dandy (1942), directed by Michael Curtiz
- Paths of Glory (1957), movie directed by Stanley Kubrick, based on the novel by Humphrey Cobb (1935)
- Marš na Drinu (1964), Serbian war film about a Serbian artillery battalion in the Battle of Cer
- Lawrence of Arabia (1962), movie covering events surrounding T. E. Lawrence in the pan-Arabian Theatre, starring Peter O'Toole, Alec Guinness, Anthony Quinn, and Omar Sharif and directed by David Lean
- World War I (1964), CBS News documentary narrated by Robert Ryan
- The Great War (1964) TV series by Correlli Barnett and others of BBC
- Doctor Zhivago (1965), movie by David Lean, based on the novel by Boris Pasternak, deals with Russia's involvement in the war and how it led to that country's Revolution.
- The Blue Max (1966), movie directed by John Guillermin, titled after the Prussian military award, or Pour le Mérite
- Oh! What a Lovely War(1969), film directed by Richard Attenborough, based on the stage musical Oh, What a Lovely War! (1963) by Joan Littlewood and Theatre Workshop.
- Many Wars Ago (1970) (Italian title; Uomini Contro), set during the Isonzo campaign, where many tired Italian soldiers begin a mutiny.
- Johnny Got His Gun (1971), movie directed by Dalton Trumbo
- Gallipoli (1981), movie directed by Peter Weir
- Observe the Sons of Ulster Marching Towards the Somme, (1985), play by Frank McGuinness
- The Lighthorsemen (1987), movie directed by Simon Wincer
- Blackadder Goes Forth (1989), TV series by Richard Curtis and Ben Elton
- The Great War and the Shaping of the 20th Century (1996), Emmy-winning miniseries coproduced by KCET & BBC, distributed in the US by PBS
- Regeneration (1997), movie directed by Gillies MacKinnon, based on the novel by Pat Barker (1991)
- The Lost Battalion (2001), movie and screenplay directed by Russell Mulcahy
- A Very Long Engagement (2004), movie directed by Jean-Pierre Jeunet, based on the novel by Sebastien Japrisot (1991)
- Joyeux Noël (2005), Based on the 1914 Christmas truce.
- Passchendaele (2006), movie directed by and starring Paul Gross
- Flyboys (2006), Movie directed by Tony Bill, tells the story of American pilots who volunteered for the French military before America entered World War I.
- War Horse (2011), movie directed by Steven Spielberg, adaptation of British author Michael Morpurgo's 1982 novel.
- 1917 (2019), movie directed by Sam Mendes, tells the story of two soldiers going to send a message during the war..

== Legacy and aftermath ==
- Agnew, Kate, and Geoff Fox (2001). Children at War: From the First World War to the Gulf. New York and London: Continuum International Publishing. ISBN 978-0826448484
- Black, Jeremy (2011). The Great War and the Making of the Modern World. New York and London: Continuum International Publishing. ISBN 978-0826440938
- Chickering, Roger, and Stig Forster, eds. (2003). Shadows of Total War: Europe, East Asia, and the United States, 1919–1939'. West Nyack, NY: Cambridge University Press. ISBN 978-0521812368
- Kuhlman, Erika (2012). Of Little Comfort: War Widows, Fallen Soldiers, and the Remaking of Nation after the Great War. New York: NYU Press. ISBN 978-0814748398
- MacMillan, Margaret (2003). Paris 1919: Six Months That Changed the World. New York: Random House. ISBN 978-0375760525
- Rachamimov, Alon (2002). Legacy of the Great War, POWs and the Great War: Captivity on the Eastern Front. Oxford: Berg Publishers. ISBN 978-1859735732
- Reynolds, David (2014). The Long Shadow: The Legacies of the Great War in the Twentieth Century. New York and London: W. W. Norton & Company. ISBN 978-0393088632
- Seipp, Adam R. (2009). Ordeal of Peace: Demobilisation and the Urban Experience in Britain and Germany, 1917–1921. Abingdon: Ashgate Publishing Ltd. ISBN 978-0754667490
- Sharp, Alan (2011). Consequences of Peace: The Versailles Settlement-Aftermath and Legacy 1919–2010. New York: Haus Publishing. ISBN 978-1905791743
- Tate, Trudi (2013). Modernism, History and the First World War. Penrith: Humanities-Ebooks, LLP. ISBN 978-1847602404
- Winter, Jay (2009). Legacy of the Great War: Ninety Years On. Columbia, MO: University of Missouri Press. ISBN 978-0826218711

=== Historiography and memory ===
- Baker, Kevin (June 2006). "Stabbed in the Back! The past and future of a right-wing myth". Harper's Magazine.
- Bessel, Richard; Wierling, Dorothee, eds. Inside World War One? The First World War and Its Witnesses (Oxford UP, 2018); online review
- Boterbloem, Kees (2012). "Chto delat'? World War I in Russian Historiography after Communism". Journal of Slavic Military Studies. 25 (3): 393–408. doi:10.1080/13518046.2012.705655. S2CID 143954021.
- Cornelissen, Christoph, and Arndt Weinrich, eds. Writing the Great War – The Historiography of World War I from 1918 to the Present (2020) online free
- Deak, John. (2014). "The Great War and the Forgotten Realm: The Habsburg Monarchy and the First World War" Journal of Modern History (2014) 86#2 pp. 336–380.
- Fussell, Paul (2013). The Great War and Modern Memory. New York: Oxford University Press. ISBN 978-0199971954
- Iriye, A. (2014). "The Historiographic Impact of the Great War". Diplomatic History. 38 (4): 751–762. doi:10.1093/dh/dhu035.
- Jones, Heather. (2013). "As the centenary approaches: the regeneration of First World War historiography." Historical Journal (2013) 56#3 pp: 857–878.
- Jones, Heather. (2014). "Goodbye to all that? Memory and Meaning in the Commemoration of the First World War." Juncture (2014) 20#4 pp: 287–291.
- Kitchen, James E.; Miller, Alisa; Rowe, Laura, eds. (2011). Other Combatants, Other Fronts: Competing Histories of the First World War. Excerpt
- Kramer, Alan. (2014a and 2014b). "Recent Historiography of the First World War – Part I," Journal of Modern European History (Feb. 2014) 12#1 pp 5–27; "Recent Historiography of the First World War (Part II)," (May 2014) 12#2 pp 155–174
- Millier, Alisa, Laura Rowe, and James Kitchen (2011). Other Combatants, Other Fronts: Competing Histories of the First World War. Newcastle upon Tyne: Cambridge Scholars Publishing. ISBN 978-1443827379
- Petrone, Karen (2011). Great War in Russian Memory. Bloomington: Indiana University Press. ISBN 978-0253356178
- Mulligan, William (2014). "The Trial Continues: New Directions in the Study of the Origins of the First World War". English Historical Review. 129 (538): 639–666. doi:10.1093/ehr/ceu139.
- Reynolds, David (2014). The Long Shadow: The Legacies of the Great War in the Twentieth Century. Excerpt and text search
- Rietzler, Katharina (2014). "The war as history: Writing the economic and social history of the First World War". Diplomatic History. 38 (4): 826–839. doi:10.1093/dh/dhu028.
- Sanborn, Joshua. (2013). "Russian Historiography on the Origins of the First World War Since the Fischer Controversy." Journal of Contemporary History (2013) 48#2 pp: 350–362.
- Sharp, Heather. (2014). "Representing Australia's Involvement in the First World War: Discrepancies between Public Discourses and School History Textbooks from 1916 to 1936." Journal of Educational Media, Memory, and Society (2014) 6#1 pp: 1–23.
- Sked, Alan. "Austria-Hungary and the First World War." Histoire Politique 1 (2014): 16–49. online free
- Trout, Steven (2010). On the Battlefield of Memory: The First World War and American Remembrance, 1919–1941. Tuscaloosa: University of Alabama Press. ISBN 978-0817317058
- Turan, Ömer (2014). ""Turkish Historiography of the First World War". Middle East". Critique. 23 (2): 241–257. doi:10.1080/19436149.2014.905079. S2CID 144673625.
- Vance, Jonathan F. (1997). Death So Noble: Memory, Meaning, and the First World War. Vancouver, BC: University of British Columbia Press. ISBN 978-0774806015
- Winter, Jay, and Antoine Prost (2005). The Great War in History: Debates and Controversies, 1914 to the Present. New York: Cambridge University Press. ISBN 978-0521616331
- Winter, Jay (2006). Remembering War: The Great War Between Memory and History in the Twentieth Century. New Haven, CT: Yale University Press. ISBN 978-0300110685
- Winter, Jay, ed. (2014). The Cambridge History of the First World War (2 vol. Cambridge University Press, 2014) ISBN 978-0521763851
- Woodward, David ed. America and World War I: A Selected Annotated Bibliography of English-Language Sources (2nd ed. 2007) excerpt
- Durchleuchtung eines Verrats. Der Fall des Oberst Alexandru D. Sturdza, von Petre Otu und Maria Georgescu. Lektor Verlag. 2022. Hainburg. ISBN 978-3941866089
- Petre Otu. Alexandru Averescu – Marschall, Politiker, Legende. Lektor Verlag. Hainburg 2012. ISBN 978-3941866027

== See also ==
- Bibliography of the Armenian genocide
- Bibliography of Canadian military history
- Bibliography of United States military history
- List of bibliographies on American history
- Causes of World War I
  - Historiography of the causes of World War I
  - American entry into World War I
  - Austro-Hungarian entry into World War I
  - British entry into World War I
  - French entry into World War I
  - German entry into World War I
  - Italian entry into World War I
  - Japanese entry into World War I
  - Russian entry into World War I
- Diplomatic history of World War I
- Economic history of World War I
- International relations of the Great Powers (1814–1919)
- Allies of World War I
- Central Powers
- Home front during World War I covering all major countries
- Economic history of World War I
- Propaganda in World War I
  - British propaganda during World War I
  - Italian propaganda during World War I
- Opposition to World War I
- World War I casualties
- World War I in popular culture
  - World War I in literature
  - Fiction based on World War I
  - British women's literature of World War I
