= YMCA (disambiguation) =

YMCA is a worldwide youth and community organization.

YMCA may also refer to:

== Art and entertainment ==
- "Y.M.C.A." (song), a 1978 song by the Village People
- YMCA Baseball Team, a semi-historical 2002 South Korean comedy film

== Education ==
Other colleges and universities founded by YMCA but not including "YMCA" in their name can be found in Category:Universities and colleges founded by the YMCA.

- YMCA College (disambiguation), a number of colleges and universities founded by or associated with YMCA
  - YMCA College of Physical Education, first college for physical education of Asia, was established in 1920 and affiliated to the Tamil Nadu physical education and sports university
  - Central YMCA College, a college operated by YMCA in Chicago, Illinois, United States
  - International YMCA College was the name of Springfield College in Massachusetts from 1912 to 1954.
- YMCA of Hong Kong Christian College
- YMCA University of Science and Technology, a state university located in Faridabad, in the state of Haryana, India
- Osaka YMCA International High School, Japan

== Organizations or institutions ==
- YMCA Youth Parliament
- YMCA NSW Youth Parliament

== Sports ==
Association football

- Dumfries YMCA F.C., a football club from the town of Dumfries in Scotland
- Horsham YMCA F.C., a football club based in Horsham, West Sussex, England
- Mount Merrion YMCA F.C., a football club based in Mount Merrion, Dublin, Ireland.
- YMCA F.C. (Belfast), a former Irish football club based in Belfast, formed by the members of Belfast YMCA
- YMCA F.C. (Dublin), an Irish football club based in Sandymount, Dublin
- YMCA FC (Timor-Leste), an East Timorese football club based in Dili

Other sports

- YMCA Cricket Club, a cricket club in Dublin, Ireland
- YMCA Hockey Club, a field hockey club based in YMCA Sports Grounds, Claremont Road, Sandymount, Dublin

== Other uses ==
- List of YMCA buildings
- YMCA Press, a publishing house established by YMCA, and originally known as Editeurs Réunis

== See also ==
- The Y (disambiguation)
- YWCA (disambiguation)
