= Central YMCA =

Central YMCA may refer to:

== United Kingdom ==
- Former London Central YMCA building, the first YMCA (1844)

== United States ==
- The Domain at Cleveland, formerly Central YMCA (Cleveland, Ohio), listed on the NRHP
- 1100 Jefferson, formerly Central YMCA (Toledo, Ohio), listed on the NRHP
- 19 South LaSalle Street, Chicago, formerly Central YMCA Association Building

== See also ==
- YMCA (disambiguation)
