= YWCA (disambiguation) =

The YWCA is an association supporting women and girls.

YWCA or Y.W.C.A. may also refer to:

- Y.W.C.A. Hioe Tjo Yoeng College, a government-aided, English medium instruction (EMI), grammar school in Ho Man Tin, Hong Kong.
- YWCA Site, an archaeological site in North Kingstown, Rhode Island
- YWCA-Rolling Bay Route, a shipping route that originated from Seattle, Washington
- Wilcannia Airport, ICAO airport code "YWCA"

== See also ==
- YMCA (disambiguation)
- The Y (disambiguation)
- List of YWCA buildings
