= They (disambiguation) =

They is a third-person, personal pronoun.

They may also refer to:

== Film ==
- They (1993 film), a 1993 television drama, adapted into a film known as They Watch
- They (2002 film), a 2002 horror film
- They (2017 film), a 2017 American film

== Literature ==
- "They" (poem), a 1917 poem by Siegfried Sassoon
- "They" (Heinlein), a 1941 short story by Robert A. Heinlein

== Music ==
- They (duo), an R&B duo from Los Angeles, California
- They (album), a 1988 album by King Missile
- "They" (song), a 2005 single by Jem
- They Might Be Giants, an American alternative rock band sometimes referred to as "They"

== Other uses ==
- "They", the former name of Immortal, a professional wrestling stable
- "They", the outgroup in New World Order conspiracy theories
- "They", as in "othering"

== See also ==
- The Y (disambiguation)
