= Utsubo Park =

Public and urban park located at Nishi-ku, Osaka, Japan

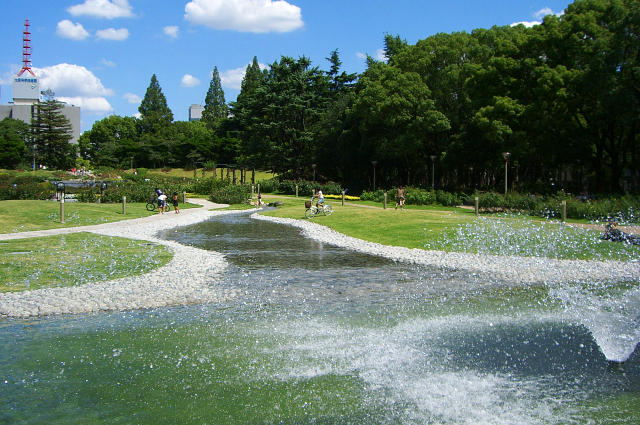
- Utsubo Park in 2006
- Interactive map of Utsubo Park
- Type: Urban park
- Location: Nishi ward, Osaka City
- Coordinates: 34.685055°N 135.492786°E
- Area: 9.7 hectares (24 acres)
- Created: 21 October 1955
- Operator: Osaka city
- Status: Open all year

Utsubo Park (靱公園, Utsubo-Kōen) is a large public, urban park, situated at Utsubo-Hommachi in Nishi-ku, Osaka, Japan.

The park was constructed at the site of a former air field of the United States Army, so the land is a long rectangle shape characteristic of a runway (700m x 150m). This place was one of the busiest fish wholesale markets (Zakoba fish market and Utsubo dried fish market), from Edo period until 1931, at that time a new wholesale market was opened at Fukushima ward.

The Utsubo Tennis Center occupies a large area of the western part of the park. Some international tennis tournaments have been held there. The most famous one is the HP Open and World Super Junior Tennis Championships.

Around the eastern part of this park, many cafes and bakery have opened after 1990. Sometimes open-air wedding are held at the rose garden. This area is becoming one of the fashionable places in Osaka city.

== Facilities ==
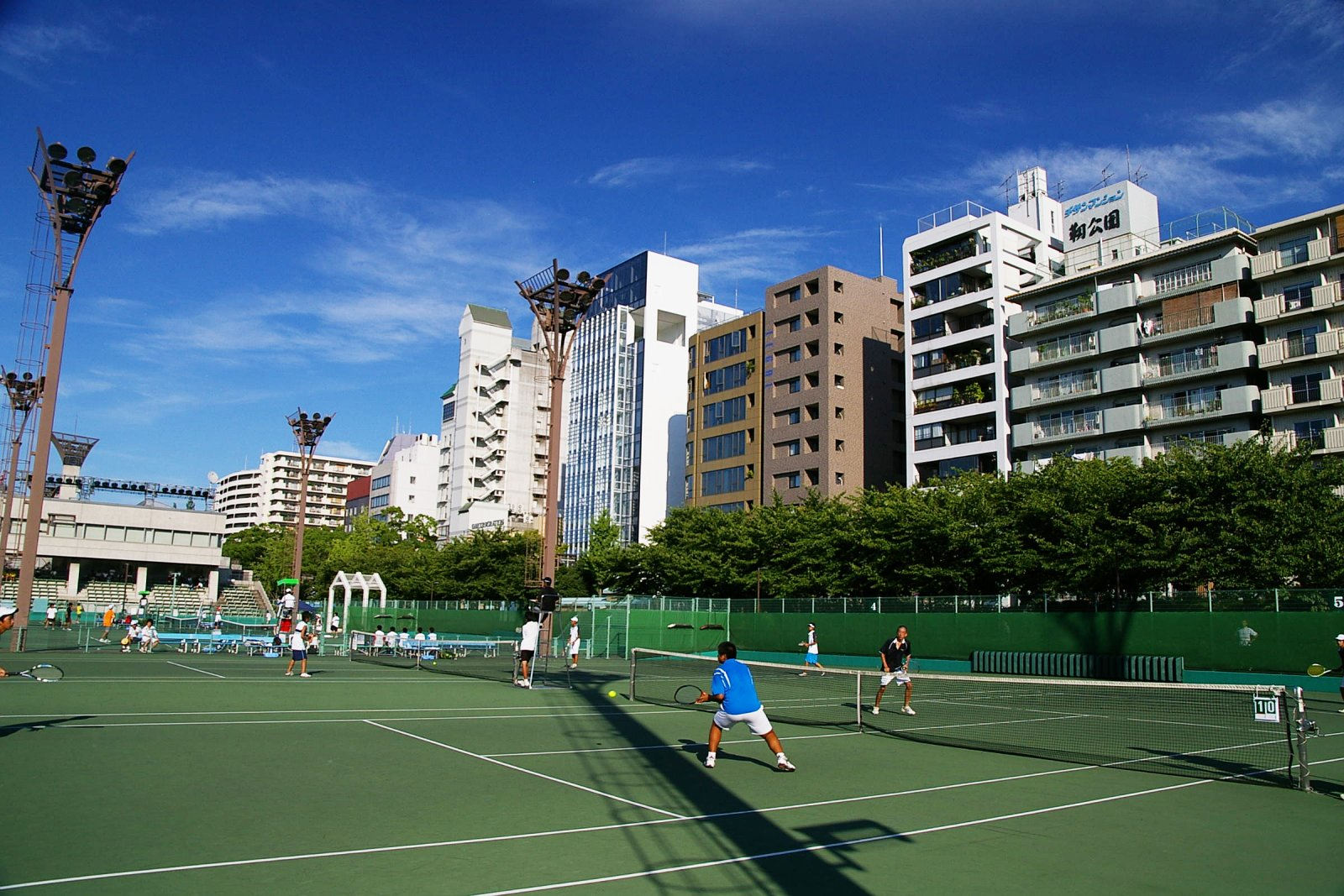
tennis centre

- Osaka science and technology centre
- Utsubo tennis centre

stadium(centre court):one hard court, capacity of about 5000
sub centre court:one hard court, capacity of about 500
public:14x hard courts, 4x clay courts

- Rose garden : admission free
- wedding hall and restaurants

== Activities in the park ==
- Rose festival : concerts, mid May at rose garden
- Flower and sculpture exhibition : from mid October to November

== Access ==
Higobashi Station of Metro Yotsubashi Line and Watanabebashi Station of Keihan Railway is closest to the eastern part of Utsubo park (rose garden). Awaza Station of Metro Chūō and Sennichimae Line is closest to the Tennis Stadium.

== See also ==
- Osaka
- Osaka Castle Park
- Nakanoshima

== Photographs ==
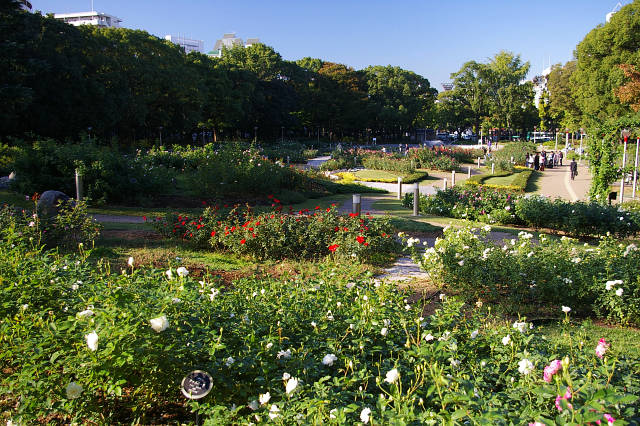
rose garden

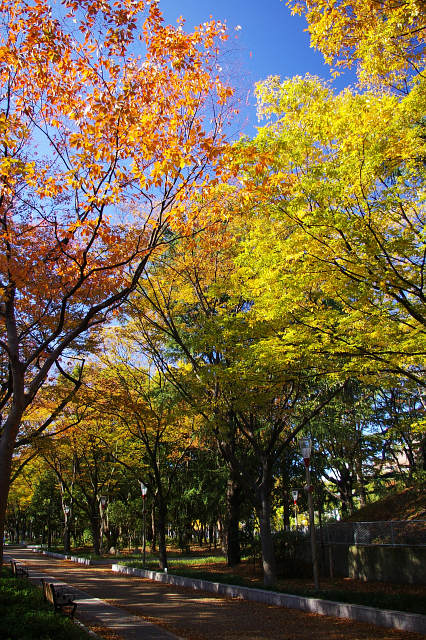
autumn tints

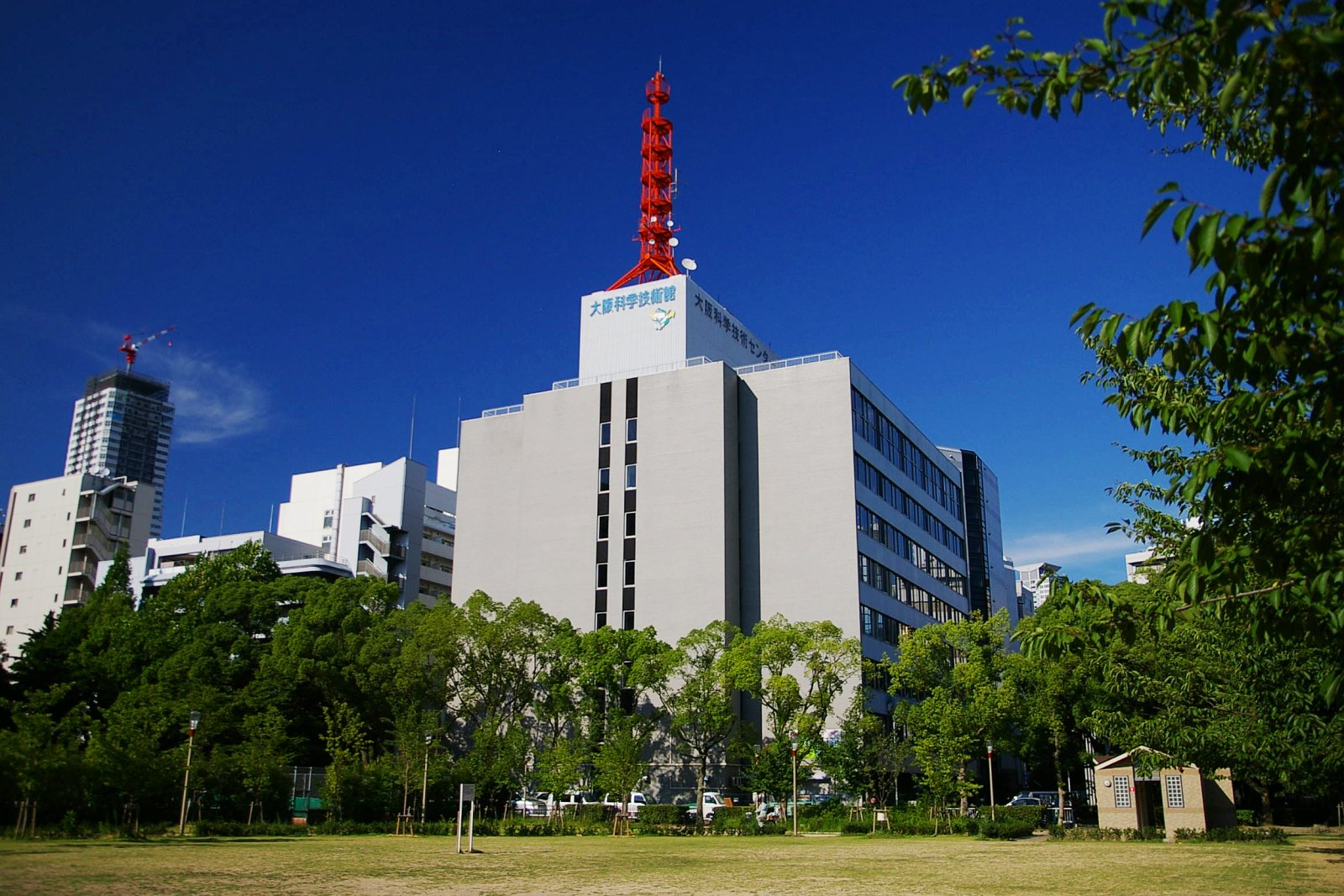
Science and technology centre
