= Nishi-ku, Osaka =

Ward of Osaka, Japan

Coordinates: 34°40′35″N 135°29′10″E

Location of Nishi-ku in Osaka City

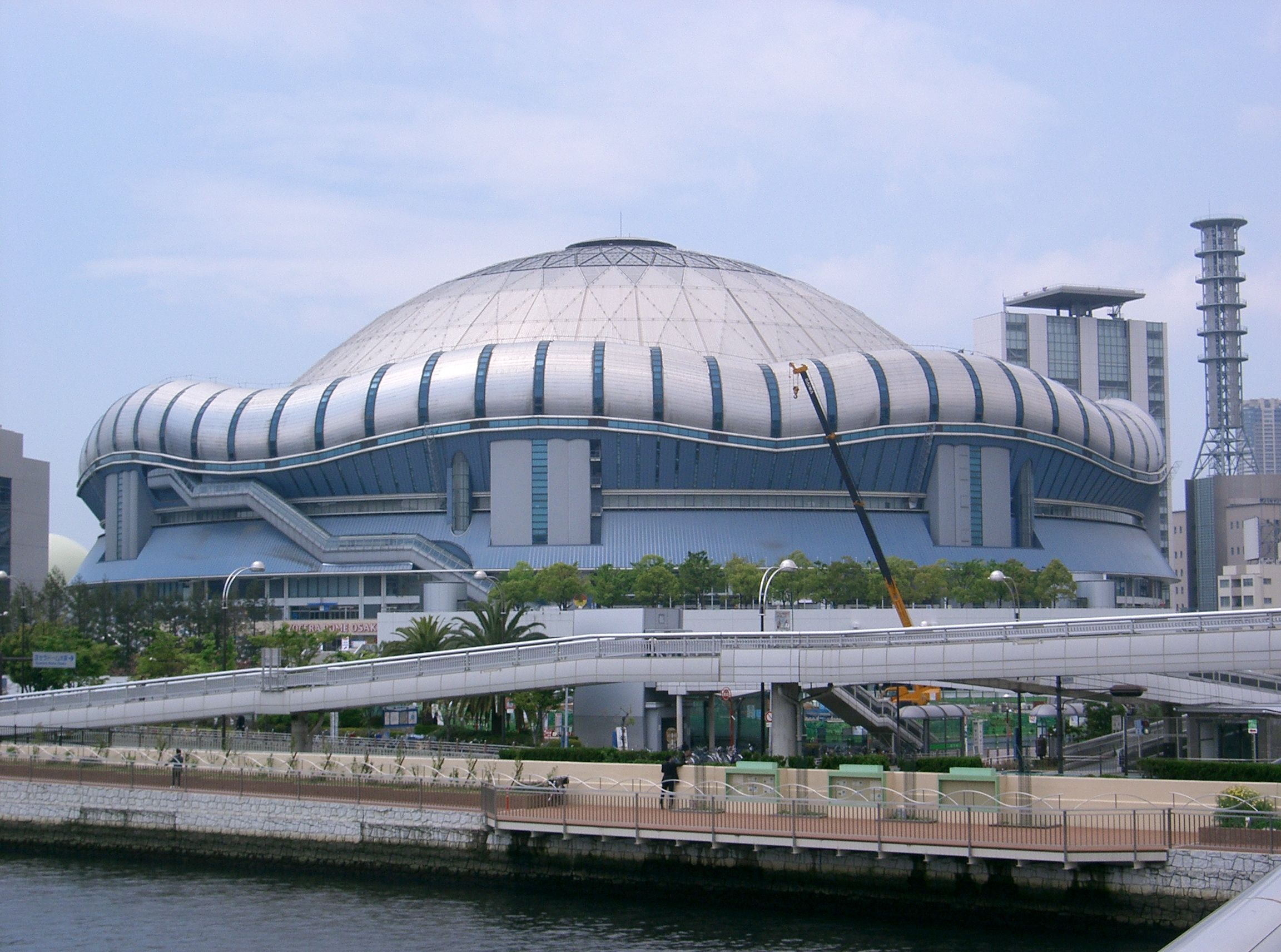
Osaka Dome

Nishi (西区, Nishi-ku) is one of 24 wards of Osaka, Japan. It is in the west of central Osaka ("Nishi" means "west"), and is generally flat. 80% of the area was destroyed by bombing in World War II, and was not regenerated until the mid-1960s.

== Governments and International organizations ==
Local government

- Osaka city, Nishi ward office (at near Metro Nishi-Nagahori Station)

Consulate

- Chinese Consulate (at near Metro Awaza Station)

== Culture ==
- Central Osaka Library (near Metro Nishi-Nagahori Station)
- Utsubo Park
- Kyocera Dome Osaka baseball stadium

== Economy ==
Several companies have their headquarters in the ward: Toyo Tire & Rubber Company in the Edobori area and NTN Corporation in the Kyomachibori area. Konica Minolta has its Osaka office in the ward.

Several airlines have offices in Nishi-ku, among them:

- China Southern Airlines, on the first floor of the Shinanobashi Mitsui Building (信濃橋三井ビル Shinanobashi Mitsui Biru).
- China Eastern Airlines in the Higobashi Lucent Building's (肥後橋ルーセントビル Higobashi Rūsento Biru) first floor.
- Hainan Airlines on the fifth floor of the Century Building in Nishi-ku.

== Diplomatic missions ==
The Consulate-General of the People's Republic of China in Osaka is located in Nishi-ku.

== Education ==
Osaka YMCA International High School is located in Nishi-ku.
