= Journal of Educational Media, Memory, and Society =

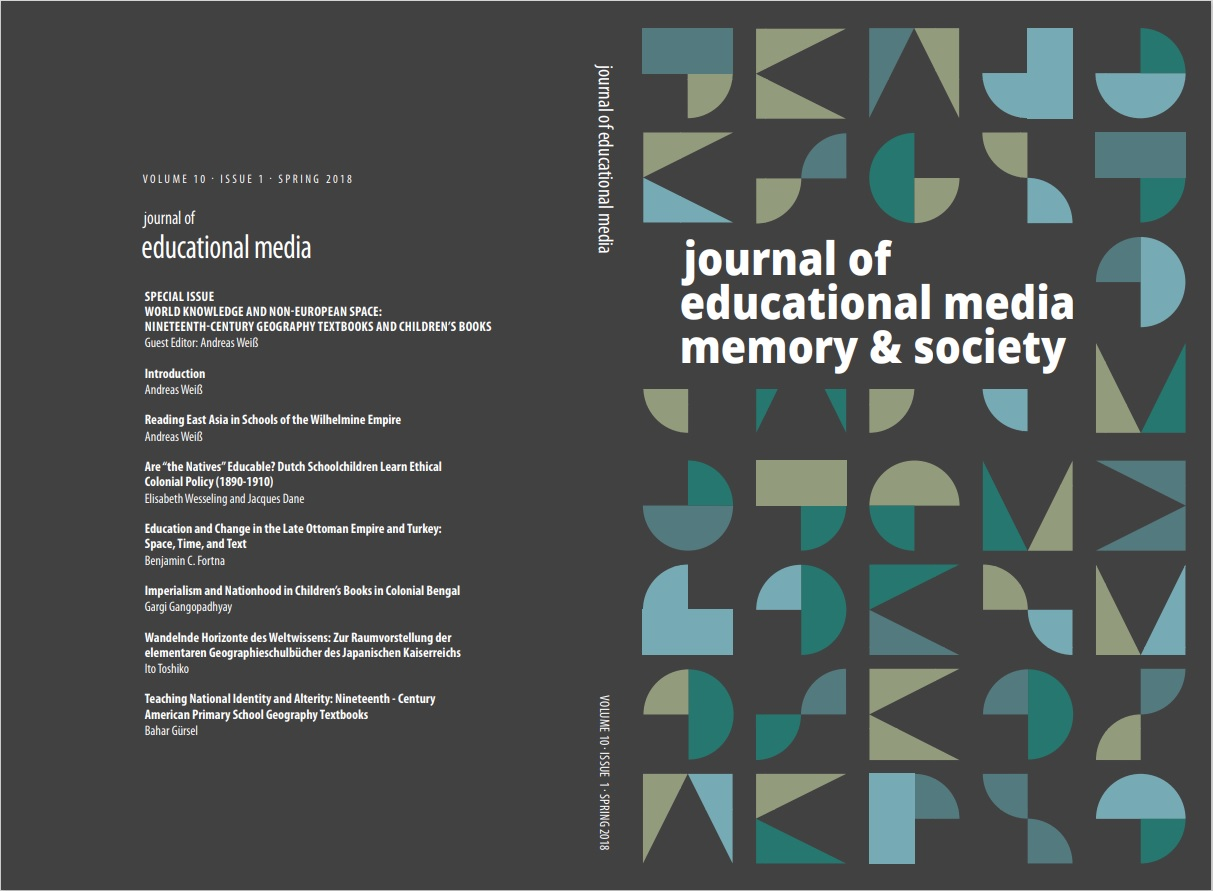
- Discipline: Education
- Language: English
- Edited by: Eckhardt Fuchs

Publication details
- History: 2009-present
- Publisher: Berghahn Books
- Frequency: Biannually

Standard abbreviations
- ISO 4: J. Educ. Media Mem. Soc.

Indexing
- ISSN: 2041-6938 (print); 2041-6946 (web)

Links
- Journal homepage

Journal of Educational Media, Memory, and Society is a peer-reviewed academic journal published by Berghahn Books on behalf of the Leibniz Institute for Educational Media | Georg Eckert Institute. The journal aims to broaden our understanding of past and present societies by examining formal and informal educational media, especially texts and images found in textbooks, museums, memorials, films and digital media.

Central topics include conceptions of time and space, image formation, forms of representation and the construction of meaning and of ethnic, national, regional, religious, institutional and gender identity. Educational media are also examined in relation to their production and appropriation in institutional, sociocultural, political, economic and historical contexts.

JEMMS is international and interdisciplinary and welcomes empirically based contributions from the humanities, social sciences, STEM subjects as well as theoretical and methodological studies.

== Abstracting and indexing ==
The Journal of Educational Media, Memory, and Society is indexed and abstracted in:

- Abstracts in Anthropology
- A Current Bibliography on African Affairs (Baywood)
- Bibliometric Research Indicator List (BFI)
- Education Resources Information Center (ERIC)
- ERIH PLUS (European Reference Index for the Humanities and the Social Sciences)
- Higher Education Abstracts
- Historical Abstracts (EBSCO)
- International Bibliography of Periodical Literature (IBZ)
- International Bibliography of Book Reviews of Scholarly Literature on the Humanities and Social Sciences (IBR)
- MLA Directory of Periodicals
- MLA International Bibliography
- Norwegian Register for Scientific Journals, Series and Publishers
- Periodicals Index Online (Chadwyck-Healey)
- Scopus
