= Aviel Roshwald =

American historian

Aviel Roshwald is an American historian and professor of history at Georgetown University.

He received his B.A from the University of Minnesota in 1980, and his PhD from Harvard University in 1987.

As a scholar of nationalism, Roshwald is noted for his belief that nations and nationalism already existed in the ancient world.

== Books ==
The Endurance of Nationalism: Ancient Roots and Modern Dilemmas (Cambridge: Cambridge University Press, 2006).

Ethnic Nationalism and the Fall of Empires: Central Europe, Russia and the Middle East, 1914-1923 (London: Routledge, 2001).

Estranged Bedfellows: Britain and France in the Middle East during the Second World War (New York: Oxford University Press, 1990).

Co-edited with Richard Stites, European Culture in the Great War: The Arts, Entertainment, and Propaganda, 1914-1918 (Cambridge: Cambridge University Press, 1999).
