= YMCA College =

YMCA College may refer to a number of colleges and universities founded by or associated with YMCA:

- Central YMCA College, Chicago, Illinois, 1922–1945
- YMCA College of Physical Education, first college for physical education of Asia, was established in 1920 and affiliated to the Tamil Nadu physical education and sports university
- International YMCA College was the name of Springfield College in Massachusetts from 1912 to 1954.
- Aurora University in Aurora, Illinois, USA
- Osaka Young Men's Christian Association College in Osaka, Japan
- Sinclair Community College in Dayton, Ohio, United States
- YMCA of Hong Kong Christian College

Other colleges and universities founded by YMCA but not including "YMCA" in their name can be found in Category:Universities and colleges founded by the YMCA.
