= On Receiving News of the War =

1922 poem by Isaac Rosenberg

On Receiving News of the War is a poem by Isaac Rosenberg which he wrote after hearing of the outbreak of World War I while in Cape Town, South Africa. Unusually, it takes an anti-war stance in contrast to much of the initial patriotic poetry produced during the early months of the war.

This poem was published in 1922, in London. It was one of his most famous poems, but it did not gain success until 1948.

== The poem ==
Snow is a strange white word.
No ice or frost
Has asked of bud or bird
For Winter's cost.

Yet ice and frost and snow
From earth to sky
This Summer land doth know.
No man knows why.

In all men's hearts it is.
Some spirit old
Hath turned with malign kiss
Our lives to mould.

Red fangs have torn His face.
God's blood is shed.
He mourns from His lone place
His children dead.

O! ancient crimson curse!
Corrode, consume.
Give back this universe
Its pristine bloom.
