= David Stevenson (English historian) =

British historian

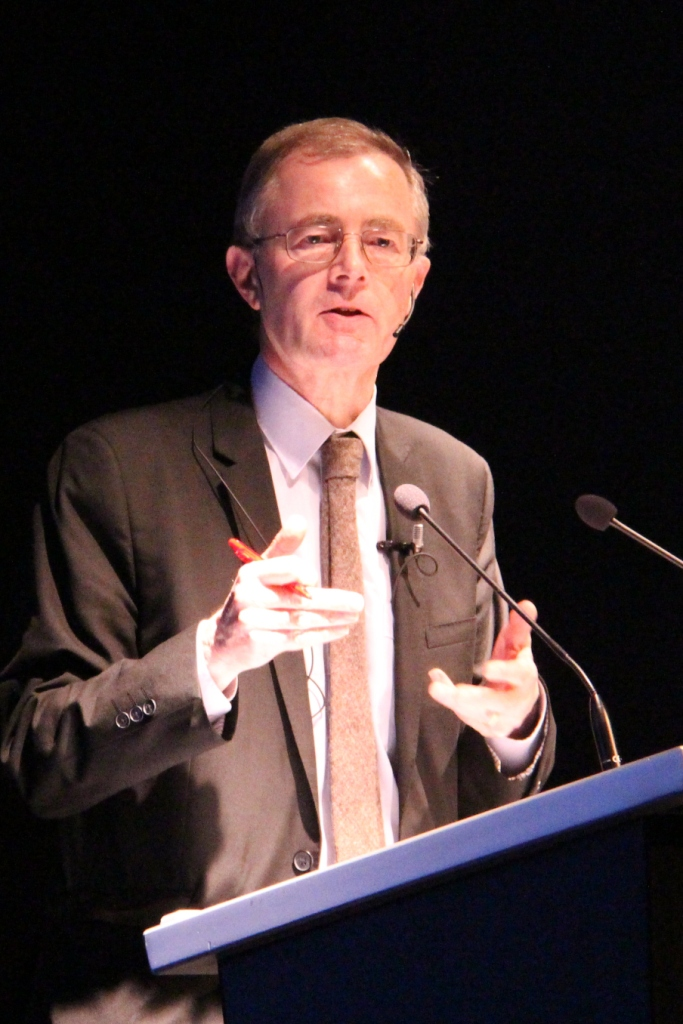
- Professor David Stevenson delivering a Gresham College lecture in November 2014.

Academic background
- Education: University of Cambridge

Academic work
- Discipline: Military History
- Sub-discipline: First World War
- Institutions: London School of Economics

David Stevenson is a British historian specialising in the period of the First World War. He is Professor of International History at the London School of Economics and Political Science (LSE).

== Academic career ==
Stevenson studied for his undergraduate degree at the University of Cambridge, before receiving a Ph.D. from the same university. He became a Lecturer at the LSE in 1982. In 1998, he was appointed Professor of International History. Between 2004 and 2005, he also received a Leverhulme Research Fellowship "for research on supply and logistics in 1914-1918"

His most recent books are: With Our Backs to the Wall: Victory and Defeat in 1918, released by Penguin (in the UK) and Belknap Press and 1917: War, Peace and Revolution, published by OUP.

== Personal life ==
Stevenson is married and lives in Essex. He is one of the founding members of the erstwhile Loughton Festival as well as being a former President of the Central London HA and the Loughton & District Historical Society. He was also previously the Secretary of the Herts & Essex Architectural Society.

== Bibliography ==
- French War Aims against Germany, 1914-1919, 1982 (Oxford University Press) ISBN 0-198-22574-1, OCLC 8170511
- The First World War and International Politics, 1988 (Oxford University Press) ISBN 0-198-73049-7, OCLC 16833256
- Armaments and the Coming of War: Europe, 1904-1914, 1996 (Oxford University Press) ISBN 0-198-20208-3, OCLC 33079190
- The Outbreak of the First World War: 1914 in Perspective, 1997 (Macmillan) ISBN 0-333-58327-2, OCLC 35212787
- 1914-1918: The History of the First World War, 2004 (Penguin Press); also published as:
  - Cataclysm: The First World War as Political Tragedy (by Basic Books, USA) ISBN 0-465-08184-3, OCLC 54001282
  - La Grande Guerra: Una Storia Globale (by Rizzoli, Italy)
  - Der Erste Weltkrieg (by Artemis and Winkler, Germany)
- With Our Backs to the Wall: Victory and Defeat in 1918, 2011 (Penguin Books, Harvard University Press) ISBN 0-674-06226-4, OCLC 709670290
- 1917: War, Peace, and Revolution, 2017 (Oxford University Press) ISBN 978-0198702382

Podcast

- David Stevenson (Pritzker Military Museum & Library)
