= Osaka YMCA International High School =

School in Osaka, Japan

Coordinates: 34.6896°N 135.4923°E

Osaka YMCA International High School (大阪YMCA国際専門学校, Ōsaka YMCA Kokusai Senmon Gakkō; or 大阪YMCAインターナショナルハイスクール) is an international high school in Nishi-ku, Osaka, established by the Osaka YMCA in 1988.
