= The Y =

The Y may refer to:

- YMCA, a worldwide youth organization
- The Y (film), a 2023 Indian film
- The Y, West Virginia, a community in the United States

== See also ==
- The Y's, the production team of Justin Timberlake, James Fauntleroy and Rob Knox
- Y (disambiguation)
- YWCA, a worldwide youth organization
- They (disambiguation)
- YM-YWHA, an American youth organization operated by the Jewish Community Center
