= They (poem) =

Poem by Siegfried Sassoon

They is a 1917 poem by the English soldier and poet Siegfried Sassoon published in The Old Huntsman and Other Poems. It disparages the attitude of the established church to the Great War.

The first verse of the poem tells of a bishop's speech about the noble sacrifice of the soldiers, and in particular mentions his view that "they lead the last attack / On Anti-Christ". The second verse contrasts with the soldiers' reply, telling of the woes of four common soldiers; the bishop replies that "The ways of God are strange!"

The poem is still under copyright in some countries. It is currently in the public domain in the United States because it was published before 1923, but will only become public domain in most countries after 2038 (author's death + 70).
