= Right to Existence Group =

Italian American anarchist organization

- Gruppo Diritto all'Esistenza
- Established: 1890; 136 years ago
- Dissolved: February 14, 1920; 106 years ago
- Location: Paterson, New Jersey, United States
- Leader: Errico Malatesta (from 1899)
- Main organ: La Questione Sociale (1895–1908); L'Era Nuova (1908–1915)

The Right to Existence Group (Italian: Gruppo Diritto all'Esistenza (Note: Also translated as the Right to an Existence Group or Right to Exist Group.)) (Note: Also known as the Society for the Right to Existence (Italian: Società per il diritto all'esistenza).) was an Italian American anarchist organization, based in Paterson, New Jersey. Established in 1890, the group drew most of its membership from migrant workers from Northern Italy. It promoted anarchist organization, in the form of anarcho-syndicalism, and had close links with the Paterson trade union movement. The group held regular meetings and dances, established a consumers' cooperative, bookstore and night school, and agitated for social revolution in Italy through its newspaper La Questione Sociale. One of its members was Gaetano Bresci, who went on to assassinate Umberto I of Italy, bringing the organization under increased scrutiny. Its newspaper was shut down and its meetings broken up by police. During the First Red Scare, many of its remaining members were rounded up and deported.

== Establishment ==
In 1890, a group of Italian anarchists in Paterson, New Jersey established the August Spies Group (Italian: Gruppo Augusto Spies), named after August Spies, who was executed following the Haymarket affair. Two years later, it was disbanded and reorganized into the Social Studies Circle (Italian: Circolo Studi Sociali). In 1895, it was reorganized once again, renaming itself to the Right to Existence Group (Italian: Gruppo Diritto all’Esistenza). The group was founded by weavers from Biella, who had emigrated to the United States for work. The group's name was a reference to the anarchist conception of the "right to life", which was defended by Ricardo Flores Magón, Luigi Galleani and Peter Kropotkin. According to Ernestina Cravello, the organization's name was conceived in protest of the poor treatment of Italian immigrants by Americans.

== Membership ==
The group was largely composed of migrant workers from Northern Italy, who worked in Paterson's textile industry. The group's core members already knew each other from their time working in the textile industries in Biella, Como, Prato and Vercelli, where they had engaged in strike actions and organized mutual aid societies. The group often supported trade unions and strike actions led by the workers of Paterson, in which they used aggressive and even violent tactics that were later taken up by the Industrial Workers of the World (IWW). With support from the IWW, group member A. Guabello led a successful strike against the Victory Silk company.

It had a smaller number of members from the Austrian, Belgian, Dutch, French, German, Greek and Spanish immigrant communities, who likewise worked in Parterson's textile industry. It also counted members from Southern Italy, and Northern Africa. Together they organized a multi-ethnic benefit society. Through Ludovico Caminita, a group member who wrote for Regeneración, the newspaper of the Mexican Liberal Party, the Right to Existence Group also formed links with Mexican anarchists. This relationship culminated with the group giving its support to the Magonista rebellion in Baja California, as well as the wider Mexican Revolution.

By the late 1890s, the group counted up to 100 members. Its membership numbers soon increased, with the group counting between 500 and 2,000 members. It was the largest anarchist group in Paterson, and one of the largest anarchist groups in the Northeastern United States. Among its most notable members were Ninfa Baronio, Ersilia Cavedagni, Giuseppe Ciancabilla, Ernestina Cravello, Pedro Esteve, Fermino Gallo, Alberto Guabello, Errico Malatesta, Beniamino Mazzotta and Maria Roda. Maria Roda and other women in the organization went on to establish the Women's Emancipation Group (Italian: Emancipazione della Donna), which organized for women's equality.

== Ideology ==
The group was a flat organization and based its activities of efforts to promote cooperation and solidarity, as a way to prepare for a social revolution. It was an anarcho-syndicalist organization, and was a key influence in disseminating the syndicalist organizational model throughout North America. It was largely inspired by the social anarchism espoused by Errico Malatesta, which advocated for federative organization and support for the labor movement. The group's organizationalist stance brought the majority of its members into conflict with Giuseppe Ciancabilla, who opposed large organizations and trade unions. This led to a split within the Paterson anarchist movement, which was bogged down in internecine infighting, while socialist organizations gained ground. Pedro Esteve inviting Malatesta to Paterson, in hopes of putting an end to the infighting. At a meeting in September 1899, the Right to Existence Group declared itself in favor of Malatesta's organizationalist programme, by 80 votes to 3. Ciancabilla subsequently resigned from the group, which came under the leadership of Malatesta. Luigi Granotti resigned his position as treasurer of the organization, in protest against the split.

== Activities ==
Every Wednesday evening, the group held meetings in Bertholdi's Hotel. The meetings usually lasted for an hour and a half, but they had no regular programme. Although the group had no president, the meetings were usually chaired by Pedro Esteve or Francis Widmar. The meetings largely consisted of discussions about politics, economics and philosophy. In another small building, the group established a consumers' co-operative on the ground floor and a club upstairs, the latter of which held dance nights and social realist theatre plays. A journalist for The New York Times reported that the premises had two busts and several portraits of Michele Angiolillo, the assassin of Spanish prime minister Antonio Cánovas del Castillo. Together with other Italian anarchist groups, the Right to Existence Group established one of the largest anarchist bookstores in the United States. It opened a night school for Italian workers, offering classes on the English language and the history of the United States. It also collaborated on revolutionary committees, which sought to promote revolution in Italy.

== Newspapers ==
To promote the organization's anarcho-syndicalist positions, the group published two newspapers. La Questione Sociale (English: The Social Question) was founded in 1895 by Pietro Gori, who worked on the paper together with Errico Malatesta and Pedro Esteve. It was published from an office on the third floor of 355 Market Street, where members of the group contributed to its administration and editing. The paper gained thousands of subscriptions throughout North America, Latin America and Europe. Its print run lasted until 1908, when the federal government revoked its postal privileges under United States obscenity law. The Right to Existence group immediately resumed publication in 1908 with a new newspaper, L'Era Nuova (English: The New Era). It also discharged the newspaper's editor Ludovico Caminita, holding him responsible for the paper losing its postal privileges, as he had published a series of anti-racist articles in the paper. With this new publication, the group renamed itself, becoming the New Era Group (Italian: Gruppo L'Era Nuova. This newspaper ran until 1915, when its mailing rights were again suspended for carrying "subversive material".

== Assassination of Umberto I ==
In 1898, Gaetano Bresci briefly joined the group and attended its meetings. At one meeting, disarmed a disgruntled individualist anarchist who had shot Malatesta. After only a few months, he left the group after he found it to be insufficiently radical. He later went on to assassinate Umberto I, the King of Italy. Sensationalist newspapers quickly began to report rumors of an anarchist conspiracy to assassinate the king, orchestrated by the Right to Existence Group. After the assassination, an agent of the United States Secret Service infiltrated the group. The Secret Service investigation found no evidence of a conspiracy to assassinate the king among the Right to Existence Group, as the group did not receive prompt news about the assassination or display signs of excitement about it. Nevertheless, some members of the group publicly supported the assassination. The group provided financial support to Bresci's widow and some of its members helped to raise her children.

== Suppression ==
In February 1907, anti-anarchist sentiment began to spread throughout Paterson, after a local judge was killed by a letter bomb. The mayor of Paterson pledged to eliminate anarchist activity in the city and directed the police to break up the Right to Existence Group's meetings. The 1919 United States anarchist bombings, carried out by the Galleanisti in cities throughout the Northeastern United States, contributed to the outbreak of the First Red Scare. Although there was no evidence that the Right to Existence Group was involved, they were grouped together with all other radicals and subjected to police surveillance. Over the subsequent year, an Algerian informant infiltrated the group and provided the government with information on its activities. On February 14, 1920, over 100 federal agents raided the homes of 30 group members. They arrested the Italian anarchists, confiscated their documents and transferred them to the jail on Ellis Island, where they awaited deportation. Italian state security continued to monitor Ernestina Cravello and her family until 1940.

== Bibliography ==
- Bencivenni, Marcella (2017). "From Margins to Vanguard to Mainstream: Italian Americans and the Labor Movement". In Connell, William; Pugliese, Stanislao (eds.). The Routledge History of Italian Americans. Routledge. doi:10.4324/9780203501856-20. ISBN 9780203501856.
- Bray, Mark (2019). "Beyond and Against the State: Anarchist Contributions to Human Rights History and Theory". Humanity. 10 (3): 323–338. doi:10.1353/hum.2019.0018.
- Guglielmo, Jennifer (2007). "Women Writing Resistance: Teaching Italian Immigrant Women's Radical Political Testimonies". Transformations: The Journal of Inclusive Scholarship and Pedagogy. 18 (1): 14–28. JSTOR 10.5325/trajincschped.18.1.0014.
- Guglielmo, Jennifer (2010a). "Transnational Feminism's Radical Past: Lessons from Italian Immigrant Women Anarchists in Industrializing America". Journal of Women's History. 22 (1): 10–33. doi:10.1353/jowh.0.0129.
- Guglielmo, Jennifer (2010b). Living the Revolution: Italian Women's Resistance and Radicalism in New York City, 1880–1945. University of North Carolina Press. ISBN 978-0-8078-3356-8.
- Jensen, Richard Bach (2014). "The Assassination of Umberto I of Italy". The Battle Against Anarchist Terrorism: An International History, 1878–1934. Cambridge University Press. pp. 187–197. ISBN 978-1-107-03405-1. OCLC 936070232.
- Jensen, Richard Bach (2015). "Anarchist Terrorism and Global Diasporas, 1878–1914". Terrorism and Political Violence. 27 (3): 441–453. doi:10.1080/09546553.2015.1032032.
- Kemp, Michael (2018). "The Cook, the Blacksmith, the King and the Weaver". Bombs, Bullets and Bread: The Politics of Anarchist Terrorism Worldwide, 1866–1926. McFarland & Company. pp. 60–64. ISBN 978-1-4766-3211-7. OCLC 1043054028 – via Google Books.
- Pernicone, Nunzio; Ottanelli, Fraser M (2018). Assassins Against the Old Order: Italian Anarchist Violence in Fin De Siècle Europe. University of Illinois Press. doi:10.5406/j.ctv513d7b. ISBN 978-0-252-05056-5. OCLC 1050163307.
- Salerno, Salvatore (1989). Red November, Black November: Culture and Community in the Industrial Workers of the World. SUNY Press. ISBN 9780791400883.
- Salerno, Salvatore (2003). "I Delitti Della Razza Bianca (Crimes of the White Race)". In Guglielmo, Jennifer; Salerno, Salvatore (eds.). Are Italians White? How Race is Made in America. Routledge. pp. 111–123. doi:10.4324/9780203616673-10. ISBN 0-415-93450-8.
- Simon, Jeffrey D. (2022). America's Forgotten Terrorists: The Rise and Fall of the Galleanists. University of Nebraska Press. ISBN 9781640124042.
- Struthers, David (2013). "'The Boss Has No Color Line': Race, Solidarity, and a Culture of Affinity in Los Angeles and the Borderlands, 1907–1915". Journal for the Study of Radicalism. 7 (2): 61–92. doi:10.14321/jstudradi.7.2.0061. JSTOR 10.14321/jstudradi.7.2.0061.
- Vellon, Peter G. (2017). A Great Conspiracy Against Our Race: Italian Immigrant Newspapers and the Construction of Whiteness in the Early 20th Century. NYU Press. ISBN 9781479853458.
- Zimmer, Kenyon (2015). Immigrants against the State: Yiddish and Italian anarchism in America. University of Illinois Press. ISBN 978-0-252-03938-6.
