= Ernestina Cravello =

Italian-American anarcha-feminist (1880–1942)

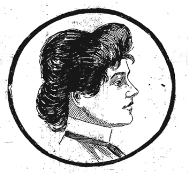
- Sketch of Ernestina Cravello which appeared in the Evansville Courier on August 5, 1900, with the headline, "Queen of Anarchists a Girl of Twenty."
- Born: 1880; Mosso Santa Maria, Italy
- Died: 1942 (aged 61–62); Paterson, New Jersey, U.S.
- Known for: Anarcha-feminism

Ernestina Cravello (1880–1942) was an Italian-American anarcha-feminist activist during the late 19th and early 20th centuries.

== Biography ==
Cravello was born in Northern Italy and emigrated to the United States with her family in 1895. To help support the family, she worked as a weaver in a factory in Paterson, New Jersey.

She became politically active in her teens, joining her two older brothers, Antonio and Vittorio, in the anarchist movement. She was a member of Paterson's Right to Existence Group (Italian: Gruppo Diritto all'Esistenza). Together with Maria Roda and Ninfa Baronio, she co-founded Paterson's Women's Emancipation Group (Italian: Gruppo Emancipazione della Donna) in 1897. The group gave lectures, wrote for the anarchist press, and published pamphlets. They also formed the Club Femminile de Musica e di Canto (Women's Music and Song Club) and the Teatro Sociale (Social Theater). The Teatro performed plays which challenged Catholic sexual morality and called for the emancipation of women. Their plays stood in marked contrast to other radical works in which women were depicted as victims in need of rescuing by male revolutionaries. The group met regularly for about seven years, and inspired other women to form similar groups.

In 1900, following the assassination of Umberto I of Italy by Gaetano Bresci, Cravello was quoted in a newspaper as saying that, although the local anarchists had not known of Bresci's plan to kill the king, they were "happy that someone had done so." Afterwards she claimed to have been misquoted:

They are only right in the fact that I am an anarchist, this is because I am moved by the suffering of hundreds of millions of workers and I struggle for a world in which such exploitation is no longer possible.

The press fixated on Cravello, dubbing her "Queen of the Anarchists." This was partly because her fluency in English allowed her to speak for the group. Despite having had a "rudimentary education," she was a confident, articulate speaker. Her youth and feminine beauty also attracted attention; one reporter described her as "young, pretty, and spirited," adding:

Her dark brown hair was carried back in pompadour fashion from her face. Her mouth was red and laughing. Her big purple eyes were full of fire. She looked like a merry, roguish school-girl—not a woman who hated and plotted and encouraged a crowd of fanatics to murder."

For months afterwards, Cravello was repeatedly interrogated by the police, who suspected she had incited Bresci to assassinate the king. Nothing was ever proven. On July 31, Il Progresso Italo-Americano reported that she had been pursued by a mob as she left work at the factory, and managed to escape lynching only because the police intervened. She used her notoriety to establish ties between anarchist women in Paterson, Hoboken, Brooklyn, Manhattan, and New London, Connecticut. Italian authorities monitored her movements, and were especially concerned when she became friends with Ersilia Cavedagni, whom they considered a "very dangerous anarchist." Cravello herself was considered "militant and very active."

Cravello eventually withdrew from public life and raised five children with her companion, Paolo Ferre, but never gave up her faith in the anarchist cause. She died in Paterson in 1942 at the age of 62.

== Bibliography ==
- Cornell, Andrew (2016). Unruly Equality: U.S. Anarchism in the Twentieth Century. University of California Press. p. 42. ISBN 978-0-520-28675-7.
- Guglielmo, Jennifer (2010). Living the Revolution: Italian Women's Resistance and Radicalism in New York City, 1880–1945. University of North Carolina Press. pp. 160–162. ISBN 978-0-8078-9822-2.
- Montanari, Fabrizio (2013). "Ernestina e Gaetano Bresci". 24Emilia.com (in Italian). Archived from the original on December 27, 2017.
- Zimmer, Kenyon (2015). Immigrants against the State: Yiddish and Italian Anarchism in America. University of Illinois Press. ISBN 978-0-252-09743-0.
