= Ninfa Baronio =

- Born: July 2, 1874; Mongrando, Piedmont, Italy
- Died: September 1, 1969 (aged 95); Haledon, New Jersey, U.S.
- Other names: Ninfa Gallo
- Known for: Anarcha-feminism

Ninfa Baronio (1874–1969) was an Italian-American anarcha-feminist activist during the late 19th and early 20th centuries. After emigrating from Northern Italy to Paterson, New Jersey, she helped found Paterson's anarchist Gruppo Diritto all'Esistenza (Right to an Existence Group); co-founded a local feminist group and performed in feminist plays; and, with her companion Firmino Gallo, ran an anarchist bookstore said to be "America's richest storehouse of extreme radical literature."

== Biography ==
She grew up in Mongrando in the Piedmont region of Italy, where she met Firmino (or Fermino) Gallo, a silk weaver. Both were active in the anarchist movement in Italy before they emigrated to the United States, traveling in steerage in 1892. They settled in Paterson, New Jersey, where they joined a community of three or four hundred anarchists, most of them Italian weavers. Baronio was followed by her siblings, Serafina, Divina, Anetta, Jennie, Egisto and Abele. The whole family became involved in the anarchist movement. Baronio and Gallo were founding members of the Right to Existence Group (Italian: Gruppo Diritto all'Esistenza), one of North America's most influential Italian anarchist groups.

Flouting the social conventions of her day, and the teachings of the Catholic Church, Baronio lived with Gallo and had six children with him out of wedlock. In his memoir, her son William describes her as an avid reader and a deep thinker with an anticlerical, anticonsumerist bent. She and Gallo raised their children as anarchists; William worked after school for the local anarchist newspaper, La Questione Sociale.

Women played an important role in the anarchist movement in Paterson. (Note: Historian Kenyon Zimmer writes, "Female anarchist migrants such as Ninfa Baronio and Maria Roda were few in number but immensely important.") With Maria Roda and Ernestina Cravello, Baronio co-founded the Women's Emancipation Group (Italian: Gruppo Emancipazione della Donna) in 1897. (Note: Historian Jennifer Guglielmo writes, "Some of the women in this movement used the word femminismo to describe their work, but most preferred emancipazione, because it distinguished their activism from bourgeois feminisms and captured the all-encompassing nature of the freedoms they desired.") The group gave lectures, wrote for the anarchist press, and published pamphlets. They also formed the Club Femminile de Musica e di Canto (Women's Music and Song Club) and the Teatro Sociale (Social Theater). Baronio was active in the Teatro, which performed plays about the emancipation of women.

Baronio hosted Elizabeth Gurley Flynn during the seven-month Paterson silk strike of 1913. Although not a mill worker herself, she was beaten and arrested on the picket line. She had gone to pick up her son William when she saw a family friend struck down by police. Her son later recalled, "Mother had come to get me and saw Paolo fall. She got down to help and the police clubbed her too. They threw them in a police wagon pulled by a horse. I ran after it crying, 'Mama, Mama!' Paolo was bleeding all the way to the jail." William went on to become the police commissioner of Haledon, New Jersey.

=== Libreria Sociologica ===
In 1903, Baronio and Gallo opened a bookstore, the Libreria Sociologica, where local anarchists gathered and bought Italian, French, and American anarchist literature, as well as Communist publications such as The New York Communist, Soviet Russia, and The Revolutionary Age. In the back room, the Slovenian anarchist Franz Widmar operated his L'Era Nuova (New Era) press. In 1912, Firmino Gallo was arrested for displaying an anti-imperialist cartoon by Ludovico Caminita in the bookstore window; he and Caminita were charged with inciting hostility against a foreign government.

Paterson's anarchists protested World War I and the draft. Baronio's son William fled to Mexico and on his return spent six months in prison for desertion. During the Red Scare, federal agents arrested Widmar and forced L'Era Nuova to shut down. For distributing anti-draft literature, Baronio and Gallo were held for questioning; in November 1917, Gallo was charged with violating the Espionage Act, but the trial ended with a hung jury.

On February 14, 1920, the FBI raided the homes of over thirty of Paterson's Italian anarchists and brought them to Ellis Island to await deportation. Among the detainees was Firmino Gallo, who was allowed to remain in the United States only after he agreed to legalize his marriage to Baronio. At the Libreria Sociologica, agents found receipts for orders from 27 states and Canada, suggesting the bookstore had become a national clearinghouse for radical literature. A. Mitchell Palmer called it "the greatest library in the country" devoted to anarchist writings. The books were seized and never returned.
