= Thomas A. Guglielmo =

American historian

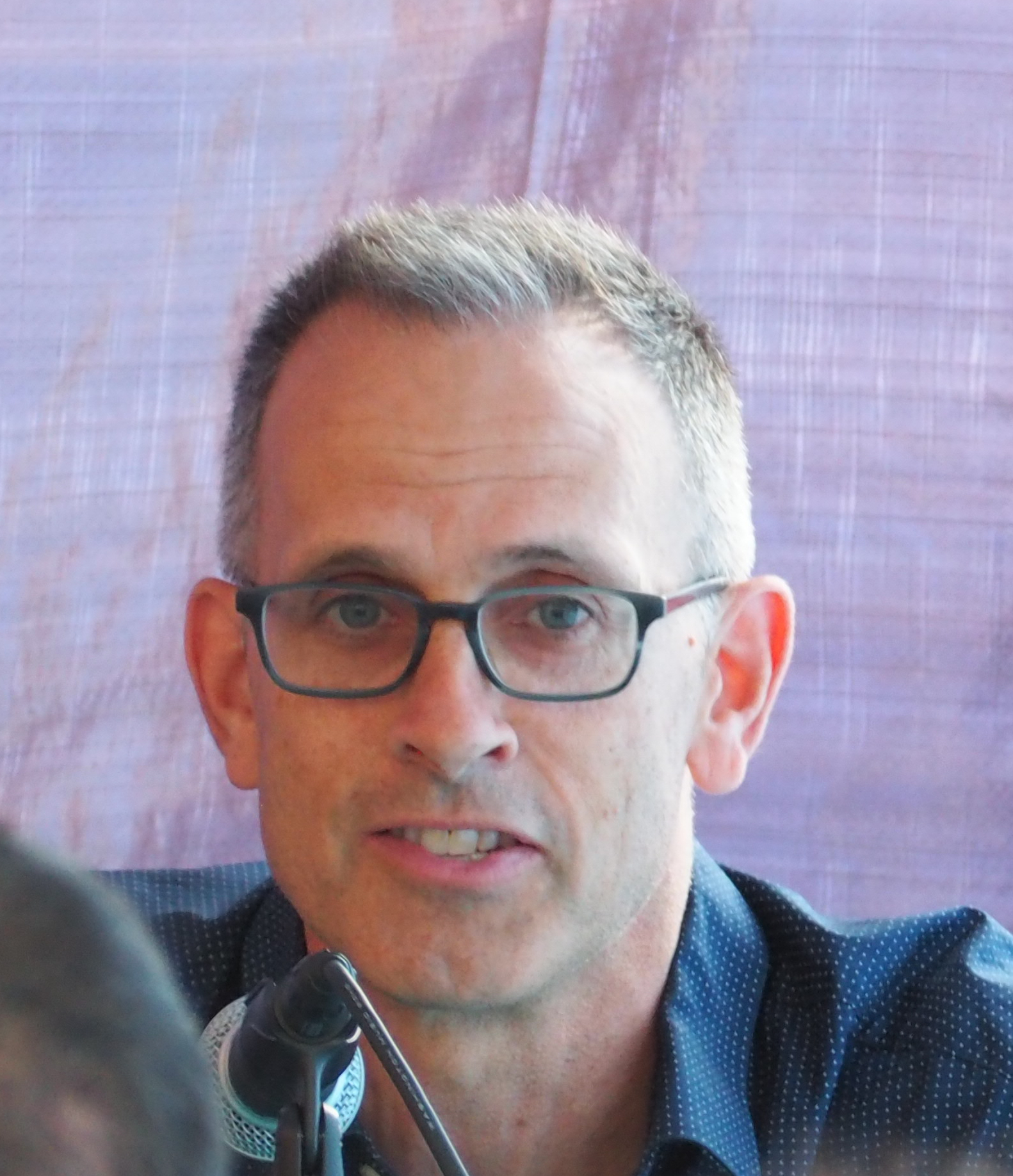
Image of Thomas A. Guglielmo

Thomas A. Guglielmo is an American historian.

== Life ==
Thomas Angelo Guglielmo was born to Thomas Joseph and Maryloretta (Smith) Guglielmo in 1969. He grew up in Hastings-on-Hudson, New York, received a BA from Tufts University, and a Ph.D. in History from the University of Michigan in 2000. He taught at University of Notre Dame before joining the faculty at George Washington University.

== Family ==
His sister Jennifer Mary Guglielmo is also a historian and associate professor at Smith College. His brother Mark Guglielmo is a contemporary artist, rapper, and record producer.

== Awards ==
- Allan Nevins Prize from the Society of American Historians
- 2004 Frederick Jackson Turner Award from the Organization of American Historians

== Works ==
- White on Arrival: Italians, Race, Color, and Power in Chicago, 1890-1945. Oxford University Press. 2004. ISBN 978-0-19-517802-9.
- Divisions: A New History of Racism and Resistance in America's World War II Military. Oxford University Press. 2021. ISBN 978-0-19-534265-9.
