= Bibliography of United States military history =

This is a bibliography of works on the military history of the United States.

== Surveys ==
- Allison, William T. Jeffrey G. Grey, Janet G. Valentine. American Military History: A Survey from Colonial Times to the Present (2nd ed. 2012) 416 pp
- Crocker H. W., III (2007). Don't Tread on Me: A 400-Year History of America at War. Random House Digital, Inc. ISBN 978-1-4000-5364-3.
- Chambers, John Whiteclay; Fred Anderson, eds. (1999). The Oxford companion to American military history. Oxford University Press. ISBN 978-0-19-507198-6.
- Lookingbill, Brad D. (2010). American Military History. John Wiley and Sons. ISBN 978-1-4051-9052-7.
- Anderson, Fred, ed. The Oxford Companion to American Military History (2000)
- U. S. Department of the Army (2001). The Writing of American Military History: A Guide. The Minerva Group, Inc. ISBN 978-0-89875-350-9.
- Black, Jeremy. Fighting for America: The Struggle for Mastery in North America, 1519–1871 (2011)
- Boyne, Walter J. Beyond the Wild Blue: A History of the U.S. Air Force, 1947–2007 (2007) excerpt and text search, popular
- Chambers, ed. John Whiteclay. The Oxford Guide to American Military History (1999) ISBN 0-19-507198-0
- Futrell, Robert Frank. Ideas, Concepts, Doctrine: A History of Basic Thinking in the United States Air Force (2 vol. 1979)
- Doughty, Robert. American Military History and the Evolution of Western Warfare, (1996) ISBN 0-669-41683-5
- Hacker, Barton C.; Margaret Vining (2007). American Military Technology: The Life Story of a Technology. JHU Press. ISBN 978-0-8018-8772-7.
- Hearn, Chester G. Air Force: An Illustrated History: The U.S. Air Force from 1910 to the 21st Century (2008), popular excerpt and text search
- Howarth, Stephen. To Shining Sea: A History of the United States Navy, 1775–1998 (1999) excerpt and text search; a standard history
- Huston, James A. The Sinews of War: Army Logistics, 1775–1953 (1966), U.S. Army; 755 pp
- Love, Robert W. History of the U.S. Navy, 1775–1941 (1992) and History of the U.S. Navy, 1942–1991 (1992) vol 1 excerpt and text search; vol 2 excerpt and text search; a standard history
- Matloff, Maurice, ed. American Military History (1996) full text online Archived 2020-01-20 at the Wayback Machine; standard textbook used in ROTC; Now replaced by Richard Stewart 2010
- Millett, Allan R., and Peter Maslowski, and William B. Feis. For the common defense: a military history of the United States of America (3rd ed. 2013)
- Millett, Allan R. Semper Fidelis. A History of the United States Marine Corps (1991)
- Moten, Matthew (2014). Presidents and Their Generals: An American History of Command in War. Harvard UP.
- Muehlbauer, Matthew S., and David J. Ulbrich. Ways of War: American Military History from the Colonial Era to the Twenty-First Century (Routledge, 2013), 536 pp; university textbook; online review
- Stewart, Richard W. American military history (2 vol 2010)
- Sweeney, Jerry K.; Kevin B. Byrne (2006). A handbook of American military history. U of Nebraska Press. ISBN 978-0-8032-9337-3.
- Urwin, Gregory J. W. (1983). The United States Cavalry: an illustrated history, 1776–1944. University of Oklahoma Press. ISBN 978-0-8061-3475-8.
- Weigley, Russell Frank. History of the United States Army (1967)
- Weigley, Russell Frank. The American Way of War: A History of United States Military Strategy and Policy, (1977) excerpt and text search
- Williams, T. Harry (1960). Americans at War: The Development of the American Military System. LSU Press. ISBN 978-0-8071-2474-1.

=== Historiography ===
- Ferris, John. "Coming in from the cold war: The historiography of American intelligence, 1945–1990." Diplomatic History 19.1 (1995): 87–115.
- Grenier, John (April 2010). "Recent Trends in the Historiography on Warfare in the Colonial Period (1607–1765)". History Compass. 8 (4): 358–367. doi:10.1111/j.1478-0542.2009.00657.x.
- Grimsley, Mark. "The American military history master narrative: Three textbooks on the American military experience," Journal of Military History (2015) 79#3 pp 782–802; review of Allison, Millett, and Muehlbauer textbooks
- Hogan, Michael (2000). Paths to Power: The Historiography of American Foreign Relations to 1941. doi:10.1163/2468-1733_shafr_sim120030019 (inactive 26 July 2025). ISBN 978-0-511-62599-2.
- Kimball, Jeffrey (May 1984). "The Influence of Ideology on Interpretive Disagreement: A Report on a Survey of Diplomatic, Military and Peace Historians on the Causes of 20th Century U. S. Wars". The History Teacher. 17 (3): 355–384. doi:10.2307/493146. JSTOR 493146.
- Millett, Allan R. "The Korean War: A 50-year critical historiography." Journal of Strategic Studies 24.1 (2001): 188–224 online.
- Romero, Federico. "Cold War historiography at the crossroads." Cold War History 14.4 (2014): 685–703.

=== Atlases ===
- James C. Bradford (2003). Atlas of American military history. Oxford University Press. ISBN 978-0-19-521661-5.
- Esposito, Vincent J. West Point Atlas of American Wars. New York: Frederick A. Praeger, 1959.
- Esposito, Vincent J. The West Point Atlas of American Wars: 1900–1918 (1997), covers entire war, not just US role
- Griess, Thomas E. Atlas for the Second World War: Europe and the Mediterranean (2002)
- Griess, Thomas E. West Point Atlas for the Second World War: Asia and the Pacific (2002)
- Griess, Thomas E. West Point Atlas for the American Civil War (2002)
- Griess, Thomas E. The West Point Atlas for Modern Warfare (2011)
- Griess, Thomas E. West Point Atlas for the Great War: Strategies and Tactics of the First World War (2003)
- Murray, Stuart. Atlas of American Military History (2005) ISBN 0-8160-5578-5

== Pre-1775 ==
- Anderson, Fred. The War That Made America: A Short History of the French and Indian War (2006) excerpt and text search
- Grenier, John. The First Way of War: American War Making on the Frontier, 1607–1814 (Cambridge University Press, 2005).
- Grenier, John (April 2010). "Recent Trends in the Historiography on Warfare in the Colonial Period (1607–1765)". History Compass. 8 (4): 358–367. doi:10.1111/j.1478-0542.2009.00657.x.
- Hirsch, Adam J. (1988). "The Collision of Military Cultures in Seventeenth-Century New England". The Journal of American History. 74 (4): 1187–1212. doi:10.2307/1894407. JSTOR 1894407.
- Starkey, A. European and Native American Warfare, 1675–1815 (University of Oklahoma Press, 1998)
- Steele, Ian. Warpaths: Invasions of North America (Oxford University Press, 1994).
- Tucker, Spencer C., James Arnold, and Roberta Wiener eds. The Encyclopedia of North American Colonial Conflicts to 1775: A Political, Social, and Military History (2008) excerpt and text search

== 1775–1800 ==
- Alden, John R. A History of the American Revolution (1989), general survey; strong on military (ISBN 0-306-80366-6)
- Black, Jeremy. America as a Military Power: From the American Revolution to the Civil War (2002)
- Carp, E. Wayne. "Early American Military History: A Review of Recent Work", Virginia Magazine of History and Biography, 94 (1986), pp. 259–284.
- Fremont-Barnes, Gregory, and Richard A. Ryerson, eds. The Encyclopedia of the American Revolutionary War: A Political, Social, and Military History (ABC-CLIO, 2006) 5 volume paper and online editions; 1000 entries by 150 experts, covering all topics
- Higginbotham, Don. The War of American Independence: Military Attitudes, Policies, and Practice, 1763–1789 (1971, 1983). an analytical history of the war online via ACLS Humanities E-Book.
- Lancaster, Bruce. The American Revolution (American Heritage Library) (ISBN 0-8281-0281-3) (1985), heavily illustrated
- Maass, John R. Defending a New Nation, 1783–1811 . Washington, D.C.: United States Army Center of Military History, 2013.
- McCullough, David (2005). 1776. New York, New York: Simon & Schuster. (ISBN 0-7432-2671-2)
- Middlekauff, Robert. The Glorious Cause: The American Revolution, 1763–1789 (2nd ed. 2007)

== 1800–1860 ==
- Bauer K. Jack. The Mexican War, 1846–1848. (1974), good on military action.
- Black, Jeremy. America as a Military Power: From the American Revolution to the Civil War (2002)
- Crawford, Mark et al. eds. Encyclopedia of the Mexican War (1999) (ISBN 1-57607-059-X)
- Frazier, Donald S. ed. The U.S. and Mexico at War, (1998), 584; an encyclopedia with 600 articles by 200 scholars
- Heidler, Donald & Jeanne T. Heidler (eds) Encyclopedia of the War of 1812 (2nd ed 2004) 636 pp; most comprehensive guide to this war; 500 entries by 70 scholars from several countries
- Heidler, David S. and Heidler, Jeanne T. The War of 1812. (2002). 217 pp. short survey
- Heidler, David S. and Heidler, Jeanne T. The Mexican War. (2005). 225 pp. basic survey, with some key primary sources
- Herrera, Ricardo A. For Liberty and the Republic: The American Citizen as Soldier, 1775–1861 (New York University Press, 2015) online review
- Hickey, Donald R. Don't Give Up the Ship! Myths of the War of 1812. (2006)
- Hickey, Donald R. The War of 1812: A Forgotten Conflict. (1990), standard scholarly history
- Johnson, Timothy D. Winfield Scott: The Quest for Military Glory (1998)
- McCaffrey, James M. Army of Manifest Destiny: The American Soldier in the Mexican War, 1846–1848 (1994)excerpt and text search
- Quimby, Robert S., The US Army in the War of 1812: an operational and command study (1997)
- Roosevelt, Theodore. The Naval War of 1812 (1882) full text online, by the future president
- Smith, Justin H. The War with Mexico 2 vol (1919); Pulitzer Prize; 2:233–252; online vol 1; online vol 2 Pulitzer Prize winner.
- Winders, Richard Price. Mr. Polk's Army (1997) excerpt and text search, focus on the soldiers

== Civil War ==
- Beringer, Richard E., Archer Jones, and Herman Hattaway. The Elements of Confederate Defeat: Nationalism, War Aims, and Religion (1988)
- Carter, Alice E. and Richard Jensen. The Civil War on the Web: A Guide to the Very Best Sites (2nd ed. 2003) excerpt and text search
- Catton, Bruce. Centennial History of the Civil War (3 vols. 1961–65); Catton has many very well written books on the war
- Current, Richard N., et al. eds. Encyclopedia of the Confederacy (1993) (4 Volume set; also 1 vol abridged version)
- Donald, David et al. The Civil War and Reconstruction (2001); 700 pages
- Faust, Patricia L., ed. Historical Times Illustrated Encyclopedia of the Civil War (1986) (ISBN 0-06-181261-7) 2000 short entries
- Fellman, Michael et al. This Terrible War: The Civil War and its Aftermath (2nd ed. 2007), 544 pages
- Heidler, David Stephen, ed. Encyclopedia of the American Civil War: A Political, Social, and Military History (2002), 1600 entries in 2700 pages in 5 vol or 1-vol editions
- McPherson, James M. Battle Cry of Freedom: The Civil War Era (1988), 900 pages; excerpt and text search
- Nevins, Allan. Ordeal of the Union, an 8-volume set (1947–1971). the most detailed political, economic and military narrative; by Pulitzer Prize winner
  - vol 1. Fruits of Manifest Destiny, 1847–1852; 2. A House Dividing, 1852–1857; 3. Douglas, Buchanan, and Party Chaos, 1857–1859; 4. Prologue to Civil War, 1859–1861; 5. The Improvised War, 1861–1862; 6. War Becomes Revolution, 1862–1863; 7. The Organized War, 1863–1864; 8. The Organized War to Victory, 1864–1865
- Rhodes, James Ford. History of the Civil War, 1861–1865 (1918), old, accurate survey; won Pulitzer prize
- Shannon, Fred. The Organization and Administration of the Union Army 1861–1865 (2 vol 1928) vol 1 excerpt and text search; vol 2 excerpt and text search
- Symonds, Craig L. and William J. Clipson. A Battlefield Atlas of the Civil War (1993) schematic maps that are easy to understand

== 1865–1917 ==
- Abrahamson, James L. America Arms for a New Century: The Making of a Great Military Power (1981), examines reformers and modernizers
- Coffman, Edward M. The Old Army: A Portrait of the American Army in Peacetime, 1784–1898 (1986).
- Cosmas, Graham A. An Army for Empire: The United States Army and the Spanish–American War (1971), looks at organization, not combat
- Holmes, James R. Theodore Roosevelt and World Order: Police Power in International Relations. (2006).
- Roosevelt, Theodore The Naval War of 1812 (1900) systematic study of the US Navy's role in the War of 1812
- Trask, David F. The War with Spain in 1898 (1996), 654 pp excerpt and text search, the most detailed scholarly coverage
- Utley, Robert M. Frontier Regulars; the United States Army and the Indian, 1866–1891 (1973)

== World War I ==
- Chambers, John W., II. To Raise an Army: The Draft Comes to Modern America (1987)
- Clark, J. P. Preparing for War: The Emergence of the Modern U.S. Army, 1815–1917 (Harvard UP, 2017) 336 pp.
- Coffman, Edward M. The War to End All Wars: The American Military Experience in World War I (1998), a standard history
- Faulkner, Richard S. Pershing's Crusaders: The American Soldier in World War I (U Press of Kansas, 2017). xiv, 758 pp
- Freidel, Frank. Over There (1964), well illustrated history by scholar
- Hurley, Alfred F. Billy Mitchell, Crusader for Air Power (1975)
- Morrow, John H. Jr. A Yankee Ace in the RAF. The World War I Letters of Captain Boart Rogers (1996), Editor, ISBN 978-0-7006-0798-3.
- Kennedy, David M. Over Here: The First World War and American Society (1982)
- Koistinen, Paul. Mobilizing for Modern War: The Political Economy of American Warfare, 1865–1919 (2004)
- Smythe, Donald. Pershing: General of the Armies (Indiana University Press, Bloomington, 1986) ISBN 0-253-21924-8
- Vandiver, Frank E. Black Jack: The Life and Times of John J. Pershing – Volume II (Texas A&M University Press, Third printing, 1977) ISBN 0-89096-024-0
- Venzon, Anne ed. The United States in the First World War: An Encyclopedia (1995)
- Weigley, Russell Frank. History of the United States army (1967)
- Woodward, David R. The American Army and the First World War (Cambridge University Press, 2014). 484 pp. online review

== Interwar ==
- Coffman, Edward M. The Regulars: The American Army, 1898–1941 (2007) excerpt and text search
- Koistinen, Paul A. C. Planning War, Pursuing Peace: The Political Economy of American Warfare, 1920–1939 (1998) excerpt and text search

== World War II ==
- Ambrose, Stephen. The Supreme Commander: The War Years of Dwight D. Eisenhower (1999) excerpt and text search
- James, D. Clayton. The Years of Macarthur 1941–1945 (1975), vol 2. of standard scholarly biography
- Koistinen, Paul A. C. Arsenal of World War II: the political economy of American warfare, 1940–1945? (2004)
- Larrabee, Eric. Commander in Chief: Franklin Delano Roosevelt, His Lieutenants, and Their War (2004), chapters on all the key American war leaders excerpt and text search
- Morison, Two-Ocean War: A Short History of the United States Navy in the Second World War (2007)
- Perret, Geoffrey. There's a War to Be Won: The United States Army in World War II (1997)
- Perret, Geoffrey. Winged Victory: The Army Air Forces in World War II (1997)
- Pogue, Forrest. George C. Marshall: Ordeal and Hope, 1939–1942 (1999); George C. Marshall: Organizer of Victory, 1943–1945 (1999); standard scholarly biography
- Potter, E. B. Nimitz. (1976).
- Sherrod, Robert Lee. History of Marine Corps Aviation in World War II (1987)
- Spector, Ronald. Eagle Against the Sun: The American War With Japan (1985)
- Weigley, Russell. Eisenhower's Lieutenants: The Campaigns of France and Germany, 1944–45 (1990)
- Weinberg, Gerhard L. A World at Arms: A Global History of World War II (1994). Global history of the war; strong on diplomacy of FDR and other main leaders
- Guglielmo, Thomas A. Divisions: A New History of Racism and Resistance in America's World War II Military (2021), Oxford University Press

== Cold War ==
- Atkins, Stephen E. Historical Encyclopedia of Atomic Energy. (2000). 491 pp.
- Bacevich, Andrew J., ed. The Long War: A New History of U.S. National Security Policy Since World War II (2007) excerpt and text search
- Bundy, McGeorge. Danger and Survival: Choices About the Bomb in the First Fifty Years (1988).
- Friedman, Norman. The Fifty Year War: Conflict and Strategy in the Cold War. (2000) excerpt and text search
- Gaddis, John Lewis. Strategies of Containment: A Critical Appraisal of Postwar American National Security Policy (1982) excerpt and text search
- Goldfischer, David. The Best Defense: Policy Alternatives for U.S. Nuclear Security from the 1950s to the 1990s. (1993). 283 pp.
- Isenberg, Michael T. Shield of the Republic: The United States Navy in an Era of Cold War and Violent Peace 1945–1962 (1993)
- Lewis, Adrian R. The American Culture of War: The History of U.S. Military Force from World War II to Operation Iraqi Freedom (2006) excerpt and text search
- Williamson, Samuel R., Jr. and Reardon, Steven L. The Origins of U.S. Nuclear Strategy, 1945–1953. (1993). 224 pp.

=== Korea and Vietnam ===
- Anderson, David L. Columbia Guide to the Vietnam War (2004).
- Brune, Lester H. ed. The Korean War: Handbook of the Literature and Research (1996)
- Herring, George C. America's Longest War: The United States and Vietnam, 1950–1975 (4th ed 2001), most widely used short history.
- Kutler, Stanley ed. Encyclopedia of the Vietnam War (1996). essays by experts
- Hogan, Michael. "Paths to Power: The Historiography of American Foreign Relations to 1941". In McPherson, Alan (ed.). The SHAFR Guide Online. doi:10.1163/2468-1733_shafr_sim120030019 (inactive 26 July 2025).
- Schulzinger, Robert D. Time for War: The United States and Vietnam, 1941–1975. (1997)
- Tucker, Spencer. ed. Encyclopedia of the Vietnam War (1998) 3 vol. reference set; also one-volume abridgement (2001).
- Tucker, Spencer. Vietnam. (1999) 226 pp.
- Tucker, Spencer, ed. Encyclopedia of the Korean War (2002)
- The Pentagon Papers (Gravel ed. 5 vol 1971); combination of narrative and secret documents compiled by Pentagon. excerpts Archived 2018-08-18 at the Wayback Machine

== See also ==
- Bibliography of the American Revolutionary War
- Bibliography of Canadian military history
- List of bibliographies on American history
- Bibliography of works on the United States military and LGBT+ topics
