= Divisions: A New History of Racism and Resistance in America's World War II Military =

2021 book by Thomas A. Guglielmo

- Cover
- Author: Thomas A. Guglielmo
- Language: English
- Subject: American military history, racism, racial segregation
- Genre: History
- Publisher: Oxford University Press
- Publication date: October 1, 2021
- Pages: 528
- Awards: The Society for Military History Distinguished Book Award, American Military History (2022)
- ISBN: 9780195342659
- Preceded by: White on Arrival: Italians, Race, Color, and Power in Chicago, 1890-1945 (2003)

Divisions: A New History of Racism and Resistance in America's World War II Military is a book by American historian Thomas A. Guglielmo, published on October 1, 2021, by Oxford University Press. The book explores the complex and multifaceted nature of racism and resistance within the United States military during World War II, as well as their long-term implications for the poswart desegregation of America's armed forces and the civil rights movement. Guglielmo, a historian and Professor of American Studies and History at George Washington University, conducted extensive archival research for the book, which won the Society for Military History's Distinguished Book Award in 2022.

== Summary ==
The book delves into the intricacies of racial discrimination and segregation within the American military during World War II, challenging the popular narrative that the military was a unified force solely focused on defeating Nazism. Guglielmo argues that rather than unifying the American people, the war effort deepened racial divisions and solidified a complex structure of white supremacy within the military. Drawing from over a hundred archival collections to present an account of how racism permeated every level of the military, from high command to the experiences of ordinary GIs, from army posts in the US to battlefronts overseas, Guglielmo argues that rather than unifying the American people, the war effort deepened racial divisions and solidified a complex structure of white supremacy within the military.

The book consists of nine main chapters and is divided into five parts, each examining a different aspect of military life—from enlistment and assignment to classification, training, and combat—revealing how these processes reinforced racial boundaries for all Americans, though most devastatingly for Black Americans.

The book also discusses the various forms of resistance that emerged in response to this systemic racism. Involving soldiers and civilians, Black Americans, Japanese Americans, and others, these efforts that began to democratize the wartime military and set the stage for the broader civil rights movements of the postwar era.

The book reinterprets the legacy of America's World War II military by highlighting the significant costs of its racial policies, including the undermining of the nation's ideals of freedom and equality and impeding the war effort itself.

== Reviews ==
Gerald E. Shenk commended the book's detailed exploration of the pervasive racial divisions within the U.S. military during World War II. Shenk noted that Guglielmo effectively illustrated how these divisions were enforced through a rigid racial hierarchy, particularly the unyielding line between Black and white soldiers. He praised Guglielmo's research and use of personal stories.

Wade P. Smith said that even though the book does not apply sociological theories explicitly, "it is rich with detailed examples, it is clearly and consistently informed by sociological ideas and reasoning, and it presents compelling insights about the interconnected actions that affect and are affected by racial attitudes and racist systems. In result, Divisions is both accessible to a broad audience and sociologically insightful." The reviewer also applauded Guglielmo for dismantling the idealized narrative of the U.S. as a steadily progressive, inclusive democracy by detailing the varied and evolving forms of racism and the acts of resistance within the military.

In his review, Douglas Walter Bristol commended Guglielmo for addressing the myth of unity within the U.S. military during World War II, presenting it instead as “a sprawling structure of White domination” that systematically discriminated against minority soldiers. Bristol said that the book's strength lies in its comprehensive analysis of how racial discrimination was enforced and resisted within the military, although he noted some gaps, such as the limited exploration of African Americans' perspectives on segregation. In the end, Bristol writes, ''Divisions raises the bar for future studies on race and World War II."

The work also received positive critical commentary on literary podcasts. On Literary Hub's Keen On, American legal scholar Randall Kennedy said it is "a wonderful book. One of the best history books I've read in a long time", while Peniel Joseph considered it "the best book on race and the history of World War II that I've ever read."

== Awards ==
=== Won ===
- The Society for Military History's Distinguished Book Award (2022)

=== Finalist/shortlisted ===
- The Gilder Lehrman Military History Prize (2021)
- The Stone Book Award from the Museum of African American History (2022)
