= Ersilia Cavedagni =

Italian-American anarcha-feminist (born 1862)

- Born: April 2, 1862; Bologna, Italy
- Died: September 11, 1951 (aged 89); San Joaquin County, California
- Other names: Ersilia Amadei; Ersilia Grandi
- Known for: Anarcha-feminism

Ersilia Cavedagni (2 Apr 1862 – 11 Sep 1951) was an Italian-American anarcha-feminist activist, writer, and editor.

== Biography ==
Cavedagni was born in Northern Italy to Francesco and Enrica Amadei. At a young age she married the Bolognese anarchist Giulio Grandi, with whom she had a daughter, Edvige. The Grandi home became a gathering place for anarchists and provided shelter to militants such as P. Gori and Vivaldo Lacchini.

Cavedagni (then known as Ersilia Grandi) was one of the few women in the region to play a significant role in the movement. She is said to have had a remarkable and lively intelligence as well as "belle fattezze" (beautiful features). She wrote propaganda and gave speeches to crowds of proletarian women. From September 1894 to April 1895 she was imprisoned in Bassano Veneto for her political activities.

Sometime in the 1890s, she met and fell in love with Giuseppe Ciancabilla, a fellow anarchist and a friend of Errico Malatesta. The pair fled Italy together during the police crackdown on workers' movements. They spent two years traveling in Switzerland, Belgium, and France, during which Cavedagni published several essays and letters in La Questione Sociale (The Social Question). In one letter, she criticized women anarchists in the United States for failing to address the "woman question," writing, "If we were to have many anarchist women, oh, believe me, the movement would grow substantially....who does not remember the teachings of our mothers?"

In 1898, Cavedagni and Ciancabilla moved to Paterson, New Jersey, where Ciancabilla became editor of La Questione Sociale and later, editor of another anarchist newspaper, L'Aurora. During her stay in the area she befriended and influenced the young anarchist Ernestina Cravello and joined the Teatro Sociale, a theater group that staged plays about women's emancipation. She published essays in L'Aurora and Cronaca Sovversiva, and edited several issues of L'Aurora after Ciancabilla was arrested for praising Leon Czolgosz (the man who assassinated President McKinley in 1901).

The couple moved to Chicago, then San Francisco, where they were closely monitored by the Italian authorities. Cavedagni was considered a "very dangerous anarchist," of "limited formal instruction but much audaciousness." Ciancabilla suddenly fell ill and died in 1904 at the age of 32.

What little is known of Cavedagni's later life is based on her correspondence and subscriptions to anarchist newspapers. She moved frequently, living at various times in Philadelphia, New York, Vancouver, and San Francisco. In 1912, she was living in Seattle with the French Anarchist Leon Morel.

According to an Italian police report, she was still living "abroad" in 1941. From at least 1927, she resided in San Joaquin County, California, where she became a naturalized American citizen in 1946. The 1950 federal census records that she was an inmate at Stockton State Hospital, California's first psychiatric hospital. She died on 11 September 1951.

== Partial list of writings ==
- "La caccia agli Anarchici Italiani". La Questione Sociale. April 15, 1898.
- "La donna". L'Aurora. October 28, 1899.
- "Scab!". La Questione Sociale. November 12, 1904.
- "Unione libera". Cronaca Sovversiva. December 23, 1905.
- "Comunicate". Cronaca Sovversiva. January 20, 1906.

== Bibliography ==
- Cannistraro, Philip V. (2003). The Lost World of Italian American Radicalism: Politics, Labor, and Culture. Greenwood Publishing Group. ISBN 9780275978914.
- "Cavedagni, Ersilia". Collezioni digitali Biblioteca Franco Serantini (in Italian). 2003.
- Guglielmo, Jennifer (2010). Living the Revolution: Italian Women's Resistance and Radicalism in New York City, 1880-1945. University of North Carolina Press. pp. 160–162. ISBN 9780807898222.
- Zimmer, Kenyon (2015). Immigrants against the State: Yiddish and Italian Anarchism in America. University of Illinois Press. ISBN 9780252097430.
