= Giuseppe Ciancabilla =

Italian anarchist (1872–1904)

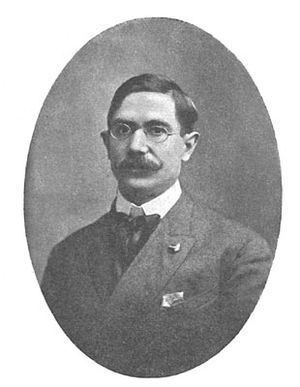

Giuseppe Ciancabilla (Italian pronunciation: [dʒuˈzɛppe tʃaŋkaˈbilla], 21 August 1872-16 September 1904) was one of the important figures of the anarchist movement who immigrated to the United States in the late 19th century, along with F. Saverio Merlino, Pietro Gori, Carlo Tresca, and Luigi Galleani.

== Life ==
According to historian Paul Avrich, Ciancabilla was one of the most impressive (now one of the least well known) of the anarchist speakers and writers. Giuseppe Ciancabilla was born in Rome in 1872.

At the age of 18, he went to Greece to join in the battle against Turkish oppression there. He acted as a correspondent for the Italian socialist paper Avanti!, but rather than fighting with the Italian volunteers he joined a group of anarchist combatants from Cyprian Amalcare who sought to encourage a popular insurrection through partisan guerrilla war.

In October 1897, he met Errico Malatesta to do an interview for Avanti!. This meeting and the response of the PSI (Italian Socialist Party) leadership to the discussion led Ciancabilla to leave the socialist party in disgust and declare himself an anarchist. This "Declaration" appeared in Malatesta's paper, "L'Agitazione" on November 4, 1897. The choice of becoming an anarchist forced Ciacabilla and his companion, Ersilia Cavedagni, to flee Italy. After a short time in Switzerland and Brussels, Ciancabilla moved to France where he collaborated with Jean Grave on the paper, Les Temps Nouveaux, though the editors felt the need to occasionally point out their differences with his perspectives. In 1898, when the Italian authorities pointed him out as a "dangerous anarchist", Ciancabilla was expelled from France. He returned to Switzerland where he attempted to bring together Italian revolutionary refugees. He was expelled from Switzerland for writing the article "A Strike of the file" in defense of Luigi Lucheni (who had stabbed the Empress Elizabeth of Austria) for the anarchist-communist paper "L'Agitatore" that he had started himself in Neuchatel.

Giuseppe Ciancabilla moved to the United States in 1898 and settled in Paterson, New Jersey, a major stronghold of Italian anarchism. He became the editor of La Questione Sociale (The Social Question), a paper which Pietro Gori helped establish in 1895, and one of the leading organs of Italian anarchism in the US. However, due to changes in his ideas, he quickly found himself in conflict with the editorial group of the paper who supported Malatesta's organizational ideas and methods. In August 1899, Malatesta moved to the US and was entrusted with directing La Questione Sociale. This led Ciancabilla and other collaborators to leave that magazine and to start the journal L'Aurora in West Hoboken. Besides spreading anarchist ideas and propaganda in L'Aurora, Ciancabilla used it for translation including works by Jean Grave and Kropotkin. His Italian translation of Kropotkin's The Conquest of Bread even managed to make its way into Italy despite legal hardships.

Ciancabilla eventually moved westward, settling among the Italian miners of Spring Valley, Illinois. After the assassination of President McKinley in 1901, the anarchist groups were raided by the police, and Ciancabilla was driven from pillar to post, arrested, manhandled, and evicted.

Driven out of Spring Valley, driven in turn out of Chicago, Ciancabilla wound up in San Francisco, editing the journal La Protesta Umana when he suddenly took ill and died in 1904 at the age of 32.

== Thought ==
Ciancabilla adhered to insurrectionary anarchist views and as such in "Against organization" he writes:

we don't want tactical programs, and consequently we don't want organization. Having established the aim, the goal to which we hold, we leave every anarchist free to choose from the means that his sense, his education, his temperament, his fighting spirit suggest to him as best. We don't form fixed programs and we don't form small or great parties. But we come together spontaneously, and not with permanent criteria, according to momentary affinities for a specific purpose, and we constantly change these groups as soon as the purpose for which we had associated ceases to be, and other aims and needs arise and develop in us and push us to seek new collaborators, people who think as we do in the specific circumstance.

He ends "Against organization" by saying:

We do not oppose the organizers. They will continue, if they like, in their tactic. If, as I think, it will not do any great good, it will not do any great harm either. But it seems to me that they have writhed throwing their cry of alarm and blacklisting us either as savages or as theoretical dreamers.
