= Pedro Esteve =

Catalan-American anarchist (1865–1925)

- Born: 1865; Barcelona, Catalonia, Spain
- Died: September 13, 1925 (aged 59–60); Weehawken, New Jersey, United States
- Occupations: Typographer, editor
- Movement: Social anarchism (in Spain and United States)
- Spouse: Maria Roda (m. 1894–1925)
- Children: 5

Pedro Esteve (1865–1925) was a Catalan American anarchist activist and newspaper editor. He first became involved in trade union organizing while working as a typographer, through which he joined the Federation of Workers of the Spanish Region (FTRE) and co-founded the Pact of Union and Solidarity (PUS). Facing heightened political repression in Spain, which followed in the wake of the Jerez uprising, Esteve emigrated to the United States in 1892. In New York City, he contributed to the newspaper El Despertar, taking over as editor after Cuban anarchists left due to his opposition to Cuban independence. He then moved to Paterson, New Jersey, and joined the immigrant Italian anarchist community. He took over editing the newspaper La Questione Sociale in 1899, but he was forced to leave the city in 1902, following the assassination of William McKinley. During a lecture tour of the country, he co-founded the Industrial Workers of the World (IWW), before moving to Tampa, Florida with his family. He fled back to New York in 1911, after he was targeted by a lynch mob for supporting a strike. He intermittently published the newspaper Cultura Obrera, but the authorities shut it down on multiple occasions. He died in 1925, but Spanish anarchists revived his publication Cultura Proletaria, and it continued to print issues until 1953.

== Biography ==
=== Early life and activism ===
Pedro Esteve was born in into a working class family in Barcelona in 1865. At the age of 14, he left education and began an apprenticeship as a typographer at La Academia. Through this job, he read a lot of written works and came into contact with many different intellectuals and workers. At this time, a liberal government headed by Práxedes Mateo Sagasta created a more open environment for the Spanish labour movement, resulting in the establishment of the Federation of Workers of the Spanish Region (FTRE) by Spanish anarchists, in a tactical alliance with Freemasons. In 1882, a group of syndicalists at La Academia formed the trade union Solidaria, bringing Esteve into contact with collectivist anarchism and Freemasonry. The following year, Esteve was elected as a union representative to the Catalonia congress of the FTRE. By 1885, he was a leading figure in La Academia and became a disciple of the anarchist theorist Anselmo Lorenzo.

By the mid-1880s, Catalan collectivist anarchists were increasingly coming into with anarchist communism, which had become the dominant anarchist tendency internationally. In 1886, Esteve helped to establish the anarchist newspaper El Productor and the social center Regeneradón. He became a public figure, speaking at political demonstrations in towns throughout Catalonia. In 1888, he participated in the establishment of the syndicalist trade union confederation, the Pact of Union and Solidarity (PUS) and represented it at the Valencia congress of the FTRE, where the latter organization was dissolved. Later that year, at a commemoration of the Haymarket affair, police forced him to switch from the Catalan language to the Castilian language while he was giving a speech. Esteve subsequently complained in El Productor that middle class Catalan nationalists had not protested against this linguistic discrimination, accusing them of a lack of interest in protecting working class Catalans from discrimination.

=== Move to the United States ===
In 1889, the Italian anarchist Errico Malatesta issued an appeal for anarchists to overcome their internal differences, to create an organized political international and reorganize the movement within trade unions. Esteve took up Malatesta's appeal against political sectarianism within the anarchist movement and became a more active trade union organizer. On International Workers' Day of 1890, Esteve co-organized a week-long general strike to demand the eight-hour day. In 1891, Esteve and Fernando Tarrida del Marmol were delegated by the PUS to attend the International Socialist Labor Congress of Brussels, during which anarchists (including themselves) were expelled from the Socialist International. Later that year, when Malatesta came to Barcelona, Esteve helped to propagate his ideas and accompanied on a lecture tour of Spain. When they arrived in Madrid, they received news of the Jerez uprising, prompting Malatesta to briefly visit Andalusia before escaping to London. Esteve followed him there and met numerous leading anarchists including Jean Grave, Peter Kropotkin, Severino Merlino and Louise Michel, before returning to Barcelona in February 1892. Three months later, La Academia was forced to close under police pressure. In July 1892, Esteve decided to emigrate to the United States.

Upon his arrival in New York City, Esteve oversaw an increase in anarchist propaganda among Spanish Americans and helped make connections between them and Italian Americans. He began contributing to the newspaper El Despertar and, in September 1893, represented Cuban and Spanish anarchists at a conference in Chicago, which intended to unify anarchists of different tendencies. After the conference, he travelled to Havana, where he gave lectures at social centers and founded the newspapers La Alarma and Archivo Social. He tried then to return to Catalonia, but he was still wanted by the Spanish police, so he decided to go back to New York in early 1894. Along the way, he stopped in Ybor City, where he met the Italian anarchist Maria Roda, who became his partner and with whom he fathered five children. Back in New York, he returned to contributing to El Despertar. Following the outbreak of the Cuban War of Independence in February 1895, the Cuban and Spanish anarchists of El Despertar were divided over the issue. Esteve opposed separatism, while his Cuban comrades supported it, leading to them splitting from the paper and leaving it under Esteve's editorship. This resulted in El Despertar losing support from the Cuban immigrant community. When the war ended in 1898, Esteve moved publication of El Despertar to Paterson, New Jersey, a city with a large community of Italian migrant workers.

=== Activities in Paterson ===
Following a conflict between anti-organization anarchists and social anarchists over the Paterson anarchist newspaper La Questione Sociale, in August 1899, the latter faction gained control of the paper and appointed Esteve as its editor. He subsequently invited Malatesta to come to Patterson and participate in the newspaper's publication. After Malatesta's arrival, the anti-organization anarchists were expelled from the newspaper's editorial staff, provoking one to shoot and wound Malatesta. Malatesta continued collaborating with Esteve until March 1901, when he left the United States and returned to London. When one of the founders of La Questione Sociale, Gaetano Bresci, assassinated the King of Italy Umberto I, Esteve praised the attack as an exemplary act of propaganda of the deed.

When the assassination of William McKinley occurred later that year, political repression against the anarchist movement increased. Esteve then had to argue that anarchists were largely not violent, and that such violent attacks were only a response to state violence. By February 1902, La Questione Sociale had been left without funds and Esteve was forced to close El Despertar and leave the city. Between 1902 and 1905, Esteve went on a series of lecture tours of the Northeastern United States, speaking on subjects such as trade union organizing and the progressive education of the Ferrer movement. In Chicago, he participated in the establishment of the Industrial Workers of the World (IWW), a syndicalist union open to immigrant workers. When he finally returned to Paterson, police immediately arrested and interrogated him, convincing him to move to Tampa, Florida, with his family. He left the editorship of La Questione Sociale to Ludovico Caminita.

=== Later life ===
In Tampa, Esteve took over the Antorcha, a social center for freethinkers of different nationalities, and established a Ferrer school to educate migrant students. Esteve had a difficult life in Tampa. During his move there, police intentionally damaged his belongings while they were in transfer. In September 1907, Esteve's son died in a petroleum explosion, in what Esteve himself believed to have been a state attack to force him to leave the country. In 1910, tobacco factory owners began lynching trade union activists during a strike, and in January 1911, conservative groups attempted to lynch Esteve himself after he published a pro-worker manifesto. He and his family escaped the lynchings and fled to New York, where Esteve went to work at Cultural Proletaria and recruited workers to join the IWW. After the government shut down the paper in October 1911, he became editor of the bilingual Labor Culture newspaper, which was likewise banned in mid-1912. Wary to avoid further censorship, he revived the paper as an exclusively Spanish language newspaper, Cultura Obrera, in November 1912. In May 1913, it became the official organ of the IWW's maritime transport and tobacco workers' unions, and a social center was opened under its name. Esteve also collaborated on other anarchist publications, including Emma Goldman's magazine Mother Earth.

When World War I broke out, it caused a schism in the international anarchist movement, with Peter Kropotkin and Jean Grave declaring support for the Allies, while Esteve and Malatesta opposed the war. In October 1914, Esteve published an open letter denouncing Kropotkin, which isolated him from sections of the anarchist movement. In November 1917, the United States government banned Cultura Obrera due to its anti-war stance and rising anti-communist sentiments following the Russian Revolution. During the First Red Scare, Esteve found a job as an English translator for a Spanish publishing company. By the time the scare subsided in 1922, Esteve resumed publication of Cultura Obrera and established a library in its social center. On September 13, 1925, after participating in a picnic organized by Cultura Obrera, he died from an intracerebral hemorrhage in Weehawken, New Jersey. Several anarchist activists wrote tributes for him, including Malatesta and Esteve's widow Maria Roda. He was also commemorated by a Catalan nationalist group in New York, which he had been working with over the previous years. Facing financial difficulties without its editor, Cultura Obrera closed down in May 1927. Meanwhile, a Spanish anarchist federation began publishing a second run of Cultura Proletaria, which continued publication until 1953.

== Selected works ==
- Socialismo Anarquista: La Ley, La Violencia, El Anarquismo, La Revolución Social (Paterson, 1902)
- Doctrina anarquista socialista (Paterson, 1905)
- Vest-Pocket Essays for the Laborer (New York, 1912)
- Reformismo, dictadura, federalismo (New York, 1922)

== Bibliography ==
- Casanovas i Codina, Joan (July 1991). "Pedro Esteve (Barcelona 1865 – Weehauken, N. J. 1925): A Catalan Anarchist in the United States". Catalan Review. 5 (1): 57–77. doi:10.3828/CATR.5.1.4.
- Salerno, Salvatore (2003). "I Delitti Della Razza Bianca (Crimes of the White Race)". In Guglielmo, Jennifer; Salerno, Salvatore (eds.). Are Italians White? How Race is Made in America. Routledge. pp. 111–123. doi:10.4324/9780203616673-10. ISBN 0-415-93450-8.
