= Maria Roda =

Italian-American anarcha-feminist (1877–1958)

Maria Roda (1877–1958) was an Italian American anarchist-feminist activist, speaker and writer, who participated in the labor struggles among textile workers in Italy and the United States during the late 19th and early 20th centuries.

== Early life ==
Born in 1877 in Como, Italy, Maria Roda was an activist in radical social movements from a young age. Her mother, Adele Parravicini, died when Roda was young, leaving her and her three sisters in the care of their father, Cesare Roda Balzarini, a weaver and activist in the local anarchist-inspired labor movements. After her mother's death, Roda and her sisters worked in the silk mills of Como. It was through the influence of her radical father and the contacts she made at the mills that she became an anarchist. The Italian government considered Cesare Roda to be one of the main anarchists in Como with connections to others in the movement abroad, and they monitored his activities and those of Maria throughout the late nineteenth and early twentieth centuries.

== Early arrest and trial ==
In 1891, Maria Roda was arrested and sent to prison for three months for her involvement in a labor strike in Milan. Roda had been accused of inciting the strikers to riot against the police. She became famous among European activists for her spirit and her willingness to speak her mind. Even though she was only fourteen years old, she received this harsh sentence because of her defiant attitude towards the judge. When questioned about her role in inciting the riot by taunting a police officer, she said, "I pity [that] guard. I pity him because he barely earns his bread, because he's a poor devil. But it impresses me to see him go after other poor devils, his brothers...let him think about this."

== Activism in Italian American anarchist movement ==
The Roda family immigrated to the United States in 1893 when Maria was 17. They settled in Paterson, New Jersey, and quickly became active in the anarchist milieu there through one of the largest and more influential anarchist groups in the United States, Right to Existence Group (Italian: Gruppo Diritto all'Esistenza). Frustrated by the marginalization of women within the movement, Maria Roda and a few of the other activist women (including Ninfa Baronio and Ernestina Cravello) formed the Women's Emancipation Group (Italian: Gruppo Emancipazione della Donna) in 1897, so women in the anarchist movement could meet on their own and develop their own theories and methods of revolutionary working-class activism. As a result, Maria Roda and dozens of other women wrote, published and circulated anarchist-feminist writing through this and similar women's groups. Two of Roda's essays were published in La Questione Sociale (the Italian-language anarchist newspaper that was published in Paterson): "Alle operaie" (To women workers), September 15, 1897, and "Alle Madri" (To mothers), September 7, 1901.

== Roda and Emma Goldman ==
Emma Goldman first heard Maria Roda give a speech at a large rally in 1894 at the Thalia Theater in Manhattan, which celebrated Goldman's release from prison. Although it was in Italian and Goldman understood none of it, she wrote in her memoir how she was moved by Roda's charismatic presence. Goldman wrote, "Maria's strange beauty and the music of her speech roused the whole assembly to tensest enthusiasm. Maria proved a veritable ray of sunlight to me." She then pledged to become Maria Roda's "teacher, friend, comrade."

== Roda and Pedro Esteve ==
Roda's lifelong partner was Pedro Esteve, a Catalan anarchist, printer, typesetter, and newspaper editor who helped to establish La Questione Sociale, one of the main Italian language anarchist newspapers in the US. When Esteve was editor of La Questione Sociale, from 1899 to 1906, women's writing was at its peak in the paper. While Roda and Esteve were based in Paterson until at least 1908, they also lived in Tampa, Florida, Brooklyn, and Weehawken, New Jersey, to spread the cause and organize other marginalized workers. Their home at 611 Gregory Avenue in Weehawken was often a center of radical activism through the 1930s, with large gatherings on Sundays. They had ten children, though only eight survived to adulthood (Violet, Sensitiva, Sirio, Iris, Flora, Pedro, Helios and Zephyr); they lost their ten-year-old son in an explosion that they believed was an attempt on Esteve's life.

== Additional resources ==
- Jennifer Guglielmo, Living the Revolution: Italian Women's Resistance and Radicalism in New York City, 1880-1945. Chapel Hill: The University of North Carolina Press, 2010.
- Jennifer Guglielmo, "Transnational Feminism's Radical Past: Lessons from Italian Immigrant Women Anarchists in Industrializing America." Journal of Women's History 22.1 (2010): 10–33. Project MUSE.
- Donna R. Gabaccia, and Franca Iacovetta, eds, Women, Gender and Transnational Lives: Italian Workers of the World (University of Toronto Press, 2002). ISBN 0802084621.
- Laura E. Ruberto, Gramsci, Migration, and the Representation of Women's Work in Italy and the U.S. (Rowman & Littlefield, 2009). ISBN 0739144324
- Marcella Bencivenni, Italian Immigrant Radical Culture: The Idealism of the Sovversivi in the United States, 1890-1940 (NYU Press, 2011). ISBN 0814723187
- Salvatore Salerno, "Paterson's Italian Anarchist Silk Workers and the Politics of Race"
- Seoane, Susana Sueiro (2023). "Una Tejedora Italiana De Paterson (new Jersey): El Anarcofeminismo De María Roda". Historia Social (in Spanish) (106): 163–184. ISSN 0214-2570. JSTOR 48729173.
- Gary Mormino and George Pozzetta, The Immigrant World of Ybor City: Italians and their Latin Neighbors in Tampa, 1885-1985 (University of Illinois Press, 1987). ISBN 978-0-8130-1630-6
- Frances H. Nichols, "The Anarchists in America," New Outlook (August 10, 1901): 859–863
- Patrizia Sione, "Industrial Work, Militancy, and Migration of Northern Italian Workers in Europe and Paterson, New Jersey, 1880-1913" (PhD dissertation, State University of New York, Binghamton, 1992)
- Philip V. Cannistraro, and Gerald Meyer, eds., The Lost World of Italian American Radicalism: Politics, Labor, and Culture (Greenwood Publishing Group, 2003). ISBN 0275978915
