= Jennifer Guglielmo =

American historian

Jennifer Mary Guglielmo is a writer, historian and associate professor at Smith College, specializing in the histories of labor, race, women, migration and revolutionary social movements in the modern United States. She has published on a range of topics, including women’s organizing in garment, textile and domestic work, working-class feminisms, anarchism, whiteness and the Italian diaspora.

Guglielmo is the author of the award-winning book Living the Revolution: Italian Women's Resistance and Radicalism in New York City, 1880–1945 (2010) and co-editor (with Salvatore Salerno) of Are Italians White? How Race Is Made in America (2003). The book was translated into Italian in 2006: Gli Italiani Sono Bianchi? Come l' America ha costruito la razza. She has also published many essays and book chapters.

In 2018-21, Guglielmo co-directed the public history/digital humanities project, “Putting History in Domestic Workers’ Hands”, which received the 2022 National Council on Public History Award for Outstanding Public History Project and Honorable Mention from the 2021 American Studies Association Garfinkel Prize in Digital Humanities. Guglielmo worked with scholars Michelle Joffroy and Diana Sierra Becerra, and organizers from the National Domestic Workers Alliance (NDWA) to develop history as an organizing tool to mobilize domestic workers on a massive scale. They received a grant of $2.7 million, and the project includes a digital timeline, two documentary films, 17 workshops, a website for curriculum facilitators, and short biographies and hand-painted portraits of 21 movement ancestors. Committed to language justice, the project is in five languages, including English, Spanish, Tagalog, Nepali, Haitian Kreyol, and Portuguese. The entire project can be accessed here. Guglielmo’s research for the project has focused on the history of domestic work and organizing in North America from the 17th century to the present, to connect the multiracial and multiethnic histories that constitute this past.

Guglielmo is also translating short essays written in Italian by immigrant working-class women anarchists—such as Maria Roda and Virgilia D'Andrea—in early twentieth-century New York City and northeastern New Jersey. She is collaborating with Sicilian artist Gabriella Ciancimino, and her brother, artist Mark Guglielmo, to make these materials accessible to the public.

== Life and family ==
Jennifer Mary Guglielmo was born in Flushing, New York. Her brother Thomas A. Guglielmo is also a historian and her brother Mark Guglielmo is an artist.

== Education and career ==
Guglielmo received a Bachelor of Arts in history and women's studies from University of Wisconsin-Madison in 1990, a Masters of Arts in history from University of New Mexico in 1995 and a PhD in history from University of Minnesota in 2003. Her dissertation committee included David Roediger, Donna Gabaccia, Erika Lee and Catherine Ceniza Choy. Her doctoral dissertation, "Negotiating Gender, Race and Coalition: Italian Women and Working-Class Politics in New York City, 1880 to 1945", won the Best Dissertation Award from the University of Minnesota and the Organization of American Historians’ Lerner-Scott Prize for best doctoral dissertation in U.S. women’s history.

She taught history and women's studies at William Paterson University, SUNY New Paltz, Ulster County Community College, and the University of Minnesota, before joining the faculty at Smith College in 2003.

== Honors and awards ==
- National Council on Public History Award for Outstanding Public History Project, 2022
- Honorable Mention, American Studies Association Garfinkel Prize in Digital Humanities, 2021
- Smith College Sherrerd Prize for Distinguished Teaching, 2012.
- American Historical Association and Society for Italian Historical Studies Helen and Howard R. Marraro Prize in Italian History for Living the Revolution, 2012
- Theodore Saloutos Book Award in U.S. Immigration History for Living the Revolution, 2010.
- Honorable Mention from the Berkshire Conference of Women Historians for Best First Book, Living the Revolution, 2010.
- Organization of American Historians Lerner-Scott Prize for the Best Doctoral Dissertation in U.S. Women's History, 2004.
- University of Minnesota Best Dissertation Award for "Negotiating Gender, Race and Coalition: Italian Women and Working Politics in New York City, 1880 to 1945,” 2003.

== Grants and fellowships ==
In 2018, Guglielmo and Michelle Joffroy (Smith College) received a private grant of $2.7 million for a three-year public history/worker education project (2018-2021) with the National Domestic Workers Alliance. Guglielmo's work has also been funded by the Social Science Research Council and the American Association of University Women.
