= Mark Guglielmo =

American artist, rapper, and record producer

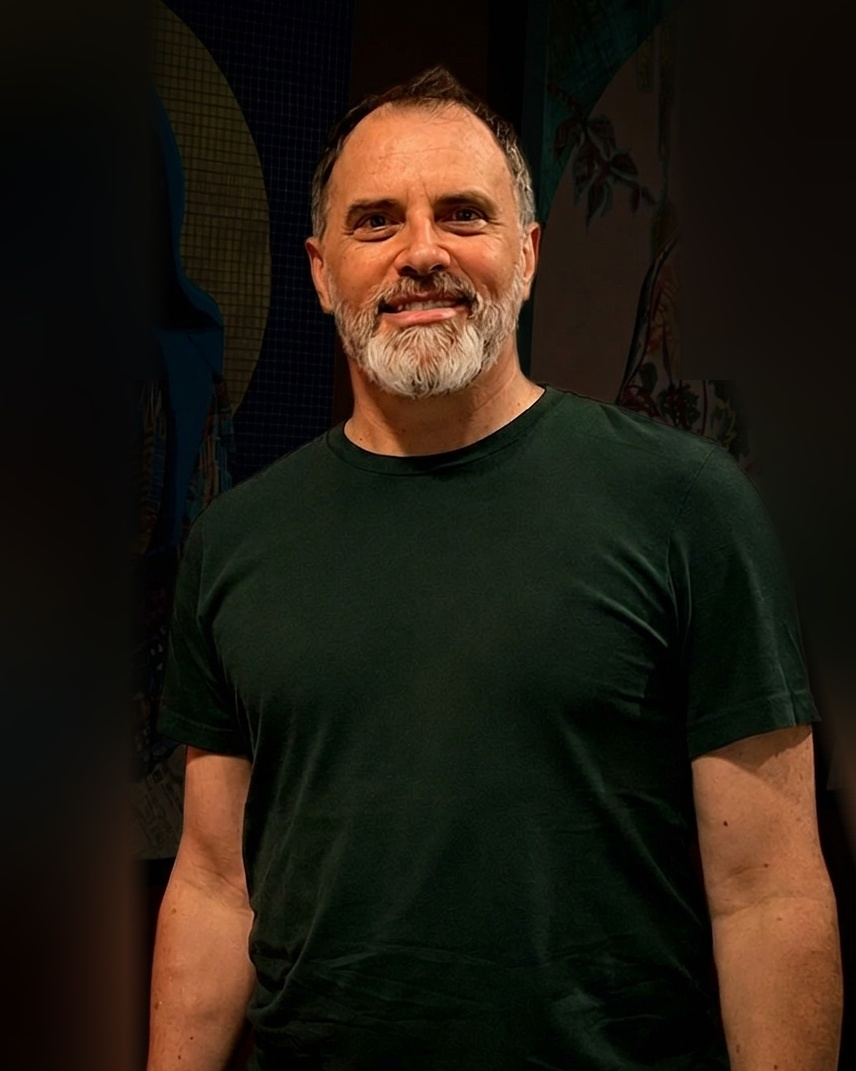
- Mark Guglielmo in 2025
- Born: Mark Vesuvio Guglielmo; 1970 (age 55–56); Queens, New York, U.S.
- Other name: Vesuveo · Manifest
- Education: Haverford College (BA History, 1992) · Université Paul Valéry
- Occupations: Artist; painter; rapper; record producer; songwriter; writer
- Years active: 1992–present
- Known for: Layered collage painting · Large-scale photo-collage · The Anonymous · Vesuveo
- Musical career
- Genres: Underground hip-hop · Alternative hip-hop · Conscious hip-hop
- Label: Survivor Soul Music · Nightglow Music · GoodVibe Recordings · Gramofix Records
- Website: markguglielmo.com

Mark Guglielmo is an American contemporary artist and rapper based in Massachusetts.

== Early life and education ==
Guglielmo was born in Queens, New York, and raised in Hastings-on-Hudson, New York, in an Italian-American family. He attended Haverford College in Haverford, Pennsylvania.

== Visual art ==
Guglielmo's visual art practice involves making photomosaic murals, influenced by David Hockney. His works incorporate oil and acrylic paint, cut paper, fabric, gold leaf, glitter, and corrugated steel. He creates photo-collages by assembling hundreds of photographs taken from multiple angles and taping them together by hand. His first exhibit of this work was "Shards of Illusion" at APE Gallery in Northamption in 2013.

His "Cubaneo" series of work involved three research trips to Cuba, producing large-scale photo-collage portraits of people he met, with accompanying audio interviews in Spanish and field recordings. Art New England said that he gave his Cuban subjects "a level of agency and complexity usually absent in American photography." The exhibit was covered in Take Magazine, the Bay State Banner, the Valley Advocate, and the Daily Hampshire Gazette. Guglielmo was also interviewed about the work on WYBC Yale Radio and on NEPM's Tertulia.

He made a series, "Spirits in the Land", based on a 2019 trip to his family's ancestral home of Sicily, which involved painting on the photo-mosaics. Another series, "Portraits of My People", consists of life-size painted portraits of his ancestors. This work addressed Italian-American identity, the historical construction of whiteness, and the politics of assimilation.
