= Army Historical Program =

The Army Historical Program is the collective effort of a number of United States Army historical organizations to capture, record and preserve the history of the United States Army. The Program is led by the United States Army Center of Military History, which creates the regulations and procedures for collecting, recording and regulating historical materials, and includes other organizations and individuals, including unit historians, the Army Heritage and Education Center and the Combat Studies Institute.

== See also ==
- Military History Detachment
- United States Army Art Program
