= Carl Boyd =

American historian

- Carl Boyd in 2025
- Born: 1936 (age 89–90); Philadelphia, Pennsylvania
- Occupation: Historian

Academic background
- Education: Indiana University; University of California, Davis

Carl Boyd (born 1936) is an American historian whose work has focused on military, diplomatic, and intelligence history, particularly German-Japanese relations during the Second World War.

== Early life and education ==
Boyd was born in Philadelphia in 1936. He served in the United States Navy from 1954 to 1958.

He studied history at Indiana University, receiving a B.A. in 1962 and an M.A. in 1963. Boyd received his Ph.D. in history from the University of California, Davis, in 1971.

== Career ==
Boyd joined the history faculty of Old Dominion University in 1975. He was named an Eminent Scholar at the university in 1994 and Louis I. Jaffé Professor of History in 1995.

He was a visiting research scholar at the U.S. Army Center of Military History from 1988 to 1989. From 1999 to 2000, he was a Fulbright lecturer at Adam Mickiewicz University in Poland. He was also a Scholar-in-Residence at the National Security Agency.

Boyd's research has included German–Japanese relations, military intelligence, and submarine warfare. He has described his approach to military history as Clausewitzian, emphasizing the political and diplomatic dimensions of warfare alongside military operations. His 1993 book, Hitler's Japanese Confidant: General Ōshima Hiroshi and MAGIC Intelligence, 1941–1945, examined Japanese–German relations using intercepted Japanese diplomatic communications. He also wrote The Japanese Submarine Force and World War II with Akihiko Yoshida.

== Selected works ==
- The Extraordinary Envoy: General Ōshima Hiroshi and Diplomacy in the Third Reich, 1934–1939 (University Press of America, 1980)
- Hitler's Japanese Confidant: General Ōshima Hiroshi and MAGIC Intelligence, 1941–1945 (University Press of Kansas, 1993)
- The Japanese Submarine Force and World War II, with Akihiko Yoshida (Naval Institute Press, 1995)
- American Command of the Sea through Carriers, Codes, and the Silent Service: World War II and Beyond (The Mariners' Museum, 1995)
- "Significance of MAGIC and the Japanese Ambassador to Berlin", Intelligence and National Security (five-part series, 1987–1989)
- "American Naval Intelligence of Japanese Submarine Operations Early in the Pacific War", The Journal of Military History (1989)
- "Anguish under Siege: High-Grade Japanese Signal Intelligence and the Fall of Berlin", Cryptologia (1989)
- "The Berlin–Tokyo Axis and Japanese Military Initiative", Modern Asian Studies (1981)
