= The Standard Bearer =

The Standard Bearer may refer to:

- The Standard Bearer (album), 1989 album by Wallace Roney
- The Standard Bearer (Rembrandt, 1636)
- The Standard Bearer (Lanzinger painting), portrait of Adolf Hitler
- The Standard Bearer (magazine), published by the Protestant Reformed Churches in America

== See also ==
- Standard-bearer
