= Walter S. Zapotoczny Jr. =

American author and military historian

Dr. Walter S. Zapotoczny Jr.
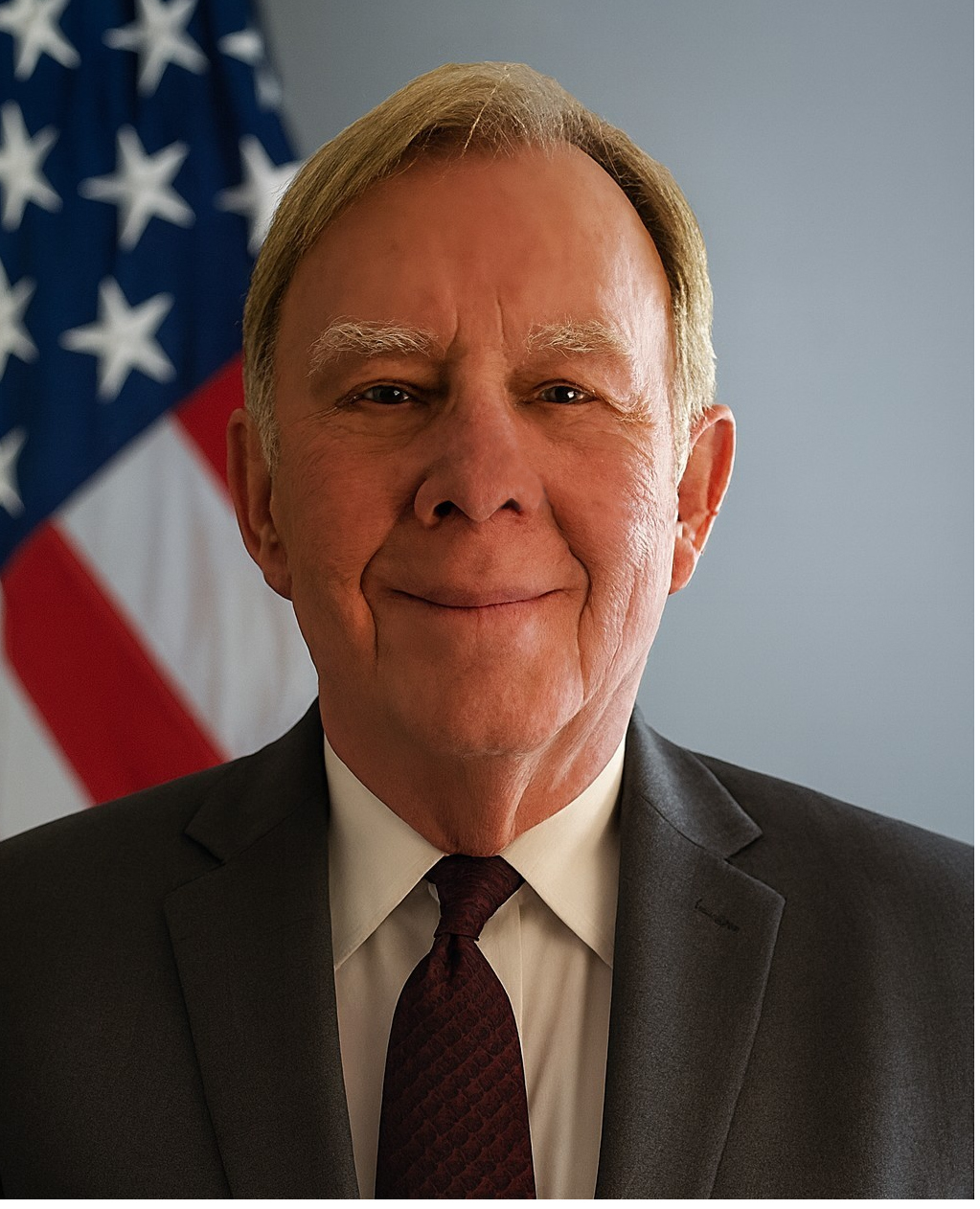
- Born: July 13, 1949 (age 77); Pittsburgh, Pennsylvania
- Citizenship: USA
- Education: PhD in History, MA Global History, MA Theological Studies, PGCert Strategic Communications, BA World Military History
- Alma mater: American Public University Liberty University
- Occupations: Author, historian, professor
- Spouse: Bonnie Zapotoczny (m. 2001)
- Writing career
- Genres: Military history, historical non-fiction
- Notable awards: Army Aviation Association of America Order of St. Michael Harrisburg Area Community College Certificate of Excellence Military Writers Association of America Historical Fiction Award
- Website: www.wzaponline.com

Walter S. Zapotoczny Jr. (born July 13, 1949) is a native of Avonmore, Pennsylvania, is an American author and military historian. He is currently an adjunct history professor at Harrisburg Area Community College. Zapotoczny serves as the president of the 28th Infantry Division Association, an organization that supports veterans of the 28th Infantry Division. He is an advisor with the U.S. Army Heritage Center Foundation.

== Early life ==
Zapotoczny served on the Avonmore Borough Council and as Chairman of the Borough Planning Commission, while taking flying lessons. He joined the Pennsylvania Army National Guard and served for eight years. Following the Johnstown flood of 1977; he was appointed as the assistant coordinator for the Westmoreland County Pennsylvania Flood Relief Program.

== Career ==
Zapotoczny worked as an Assistant Superintendent with the Pennsylvania Department of Transportation and later founded Advanced Management Systems, Inc. specializing in operations management and productivity improvement. He rejoined the Pennsylvania Army National Guard as a part-time soldier, focusing on aviation operations, and transitioned to active duty in November 1993, with his military career culminating in the role of Command Historian for the 28th Infantry Division. In that capacity he documented the division’s history and collected materials from combat operations.

His work took him to World War I and II battlefields across Europe, memorials in Luxembourg, Belgium, Germany, Egypt, and France, and the Dachau and Flossenbürg Nazi concentration camps in Germany. His expertise focuses on the Battle of the Bulge, comprehensive Holocaust studies, and analysis of events that transcend beyond the boundaries of individual states, regions, and cultures. Zapotoczny conducted interviews with military veterans, some of which are archived at the Library of Congress and the 28th Infantry Division Association.

Following his retirement in 2009, Zapotoczny and his wife relocated to Los Barriles, Baja California, Mexico. While in Mexico, he served on the East Cape Arts Association board advisory committee and taught the East Cape writers' workshops while working as the managing editor of East Capers, a regional magazine. Zapotoczny contributed articles to Destine Cabo focusing on the culture and history of Baja California, where his work on local history was featured. He later returned to the United States to continue academic and consulting work.

== Education ==
Zapotoczny earned a Bachelor of Arts in World Military History and a Master of Arts in Global History from American Public University. He holds a Doctorate in History, a Master of Arts in Theological Studies, and a Graduate Certificate in Strategic Communications from Liberty University. He is also a graduate of the U.S. Army Sergeants Major Academy and the U.S. Army Battle Staff NCO Course.

== Published works ==
Zapotoczny has written extensively on military history, particularly World War II, and the history of the East Cape region in Baja California and films. His works primarily analyze key battles, soldier experiences, and the ethical dimensions of warfare.

=== Books ===
- Sonderkommando Elbe: The Luftwaffe’s Kamikaze Force. Fonthill Media. 2026. ISBN 978-1-78155-941-3.
- The 28th Infantry Division in the Battle of the Bulge. Fonthill Media. 2025. ISBN 978-1781559284.
- The Road to Auschwitz. Fonthill Media. 2023. ISBN 978-1781558805.
- Crushing the Japanese Surface Fleet at the Battle of the Surigao Strait. Fonthill Media. 2022. ISBN 978-1781558737.
- The Aztec Eagles. Fonthill Media. 2020. ISBN 978-1781557471.
- The Italian Army in North Africa. Fonthill Media. 2018. ISBN 978-1781556740.
- Strafbattalion. Fonthill Media. 2018. ISBN 978-1781556474.
- The 110th Holds in the Ardennes. Fonthill Media. 2017. ISBN 978-1781556054.
- Beyond Duty: The Reasons Some Soldiers Commit Atrocities Fonthill Media. 2017. ISBN 978-1625451125.
- Decima Flottiglia Mas: The Best Commandos of the Second World War. Fonthill Media. 2017. ISBN 978-1625451132.
- East Capers: Tenth Anniversary Anthology. CreateSpace Independent Publishing. 2011.ISBN 978-1460913802.
- For the Fatherland. Book Surge Publishing. 2009. ISBN 978-1439235928.
- The Chronicles of the 28th Infantry Division. Book Surge Publishing. 2009. ISBN 978-1439239728.

=== Magazine articles ===
==== Military history ====
- The Bloody Bucket at Colmar. World War II History. Spring 2025.
- Against All Odds. World War II Quarterly. Winter 2020.
- The Road to Nanking. World War II Quarterly. Fall 2011.
- Italy’s North African Misadventure. World War II History. January 2010
- Triangle of Courage. Pennsylvania Guardians. Spring 2009.
- Silver Star Awarded to Pennsylvania Soldier. National Guard News. January 2009.
- Above and Beyond the Skies of Iraq. Pennsylvania Guardians. Winter 2008.
- Weird and Wonderful Tales of Deployment. Pennsylvania Guardians. Fall 2008.
- Doughboys, Dog Faces and Darned Good. Pennsylvania Guardians. Summer 2008.
- Shadow Warriors. Army Aviation. November 2007.
- Using Aviation Warfighting Simulation Training. Army Aviation. July 2007.

==== History of the Baja California East Cape Region ====
- Why Do Americans Move to Mexico. East Capers. April/May 2018.
- Tianguis Comes to Los Barriles East Capers. April 2012.
- Art of a Different Form. East Capers. February 2012.
- Kickin' Around the East Cape. Destino Los Cabos. Spring/Summer 2011.
- Exploring San Antonio. Destino Los Cabos. Fall 2010.

=== Playing cards ===
- Special Ops and Elite Forces Army Playing Cards. United States Games Systems. 2012. ISBN 978-1572817258
- Special Ops and Elite Forces Marines Playing Cards. United States Games Systems. 2012. ISBN 978-1572817289

=== Film and concert reviews ===
- Metallica Electrifies Philadelphia with Explosive “M72 World Tour” Stop. Media Mikes. May 2025.
- Brit Floyd Delivers on the 50th Anniversary of Dark Side of the Moon. Media Mikes. August 2023.
- Journey to Royal – A WWII Rescue Mission. Media Mikes. November 2022.
- Brit Floyd Creates Magic for the Crowd in Hershey, PA. Media Mikes. March 2022.

== Historical conferences and interviews ==
Zapotoczny has presented at historical conferences and appeared on history-focused podcasts and media outlets, discussing his research in military history, including:

=== Historical conferences ===
- WWII American Experience, Battle of the Bulge Conference, Gettysburg, PA | February 2026.
- Battle of the Bulge Association, Annual Reunion, Philadelphia, PA | September 2025.
- Society of the 3rd Infantry Division, Historical Conference, Alexandria, VA | February 2025.
- WWII American Experience, Battle of the Bulge Conference, Gettysburg, PA | January 2025.
- Circle of Studies on the Battle of the Bulge, Battle of the Bulge Conference, Clervaux, Luxembourg | December 2024.
- 80th Anniversary of the Battle of the Bulge, Army Expo'24, Army Heritage and Education Center, Carlisle, PA | September 2024.
- Society of the 3rd Infantry Division, Colmar Pocket Conference, French Embassy, Washington, DC | February 2023.
- Harrisburg Area Community College, Academic Session, Harrisburg, PA | February 2023.
- 50th Anniversary Ceremony of Circle of Studies on the Battle of the Bulge, Marnach, Luxembourg | December 2022.
- 75th Anniversary of the Battle of the Bulge Conference, Clervaux, Luxembourg | December 2019

=== Media Interviews ===
- The 28th Infantry Division and the Battle of the Bulge - ABC TV, July 2025
- 80th Anniversary of the Battle of the Bulge - WITF-PBS, December 2024
- The Battle of the Hürtgen Forest - Veterans Breakfast Club, November 2024
- The Italian Army in WWII - News Corp London, September 2024
- The 110th Holds in the Ardennes, 1944 - ABC TV, December 2017

=== Podcasts ===
- The 28th Infantry Division in the Battle of the Bulge - We’re Not Lost, Private, October 2026
- The Hlinka Guard and the Deportation of the Slovak Jews - The Briefing Room: The Biographer’s Chair, September 2026
- The Battle of the Bulge Remembered - Veterans Breakfast Club, December 2025
- On the Couch - CR38IVES London, January 2024
- The 28th Infantry Division in the Battle of the Bulge - WWII TV, December 2023
- The Aztec Eagles - Patreon WWII, February 2022
- The Aztec Eagles - MacArthur Memorial, October 2021
- The Italian Army in North Africa - Patreon WWII, December 2018
- Strafbattalion: Hitler’s Penal Battalions - Patreon WWII, May 2018
- The 110th Holds in the Ardennes, 1944 - Patreon WWII, February 2018

== Notable awards ==
- Army Aviation Association of America Order of St. Michael. For outstanding contributions to the community of Army Aviation.
- Harrisburg Area Community College Certificate of Excellence. For distinguished scholarly contributions to the study of History.
- Military Writers Association of America 2010 Historical Fiction Bronze Award - For his novel For the Fatherland.
