= United States Army Center of Military History =

Unit the United States Army

U.S. Army Center of Military History
- Seal
- Active: 1918–present
- Country: United States
- Branch: U.S. Army
- Role: Military history
- Part of: U.S. Army Transformation and Training Command
- Headquarters: Fort Lesley J. McNair, Washington, D.C., U.S.
- Mottos: Educate, inspire, preserve
- Website: history.army.mil

Commanders
- Executive Director: Charles R. Bowery Jr.
- Deputy Director: Susan K. Springman

The U.S. Army Center of Military History (CMH), part of the U.S. Army Transformation and Training Command, is responsible for the appropriate use of history throughout the U.S. Army. The Center is the flagship organization leading the Army Historical Program. CMH is also in charge of the National Museum of the United States Army, located at Fort Belvoir, Virginia.

== Mission ==
Under the direction of the chief of military history and his principal adviser, the army's chief historian, CMH's staff is involved in some 50 major writing projects. Many of these efforts involve new research that ranges from traditional studies in operational and administrative history to the examination of such areas as procurement, peacekeeping, and the global war on terror. Those works underway and projected are described in the Army Historical Program, an annual report to the Chief of Staff on the Army's historical activities. All center publications are listed in the catalog Publications of the United States Army Center of Military History, which explains how to access them.

In addition, army historians maintain the organizational history of army units, allowing the center to provide units of the Regular Army, the Army National Guard, and the Army Reserve with certificates of their lineage and honors and other historical material concerning their organizations. The center also determines the official designations for army units and works with the army staff during force reorganizations to preserve units with significant histories, as well as unit properties and related historical artifacts.

CMH also serves as a clearinghouse for the oral history programs in the army at all levels of command. It also conducts and preserves its own oral history collections, including those from the Vietnam War, Desert Storm, and the many recent contingency operations. In addition, the center's end-of-tour interviews within the Army Secretariat and Staff provide a basis for its annual histories of the Department of the Army.

As tangible representations of the service's mission, military artifacts and art enhance the soldier's understanding of the profession of arms. CMH manages a system of more than 120 army museums and their holdings, encompassing some 450,000 artifacts and 15,000 works of military art. The center also provides professional museum training, staff assistance visits, teams of combat artists such as those deployed under the Vietnam Combat Artists Program, and general museum support throughout the army. Current projects include the establishment of a National Museum of the United States Army at Fort Belvoir, Virginia, and a complementary Army Heritage and Educational Center at Carlisle Barracks, Pennsylvania.

The Chief of Military History is responsible for ensuring the appropriate use of military history in the teaching of strategy, tactics, logistics, and administration. This mission includes a requirement that military leaders at all levels be aware of the value of history in advancing military professionalism. To that end, the center holds a biennial history conference and workshop; publishes Army History, a professional bulletin devoted to informing the larger military history education community; and supplies readings for the army school system, including the ROTC community, and texts and other support for the army's staff ride program. In this effort, the chief of military history is assisted by a historical advisory committee that includes leading academic historians and representatives of the army school system.

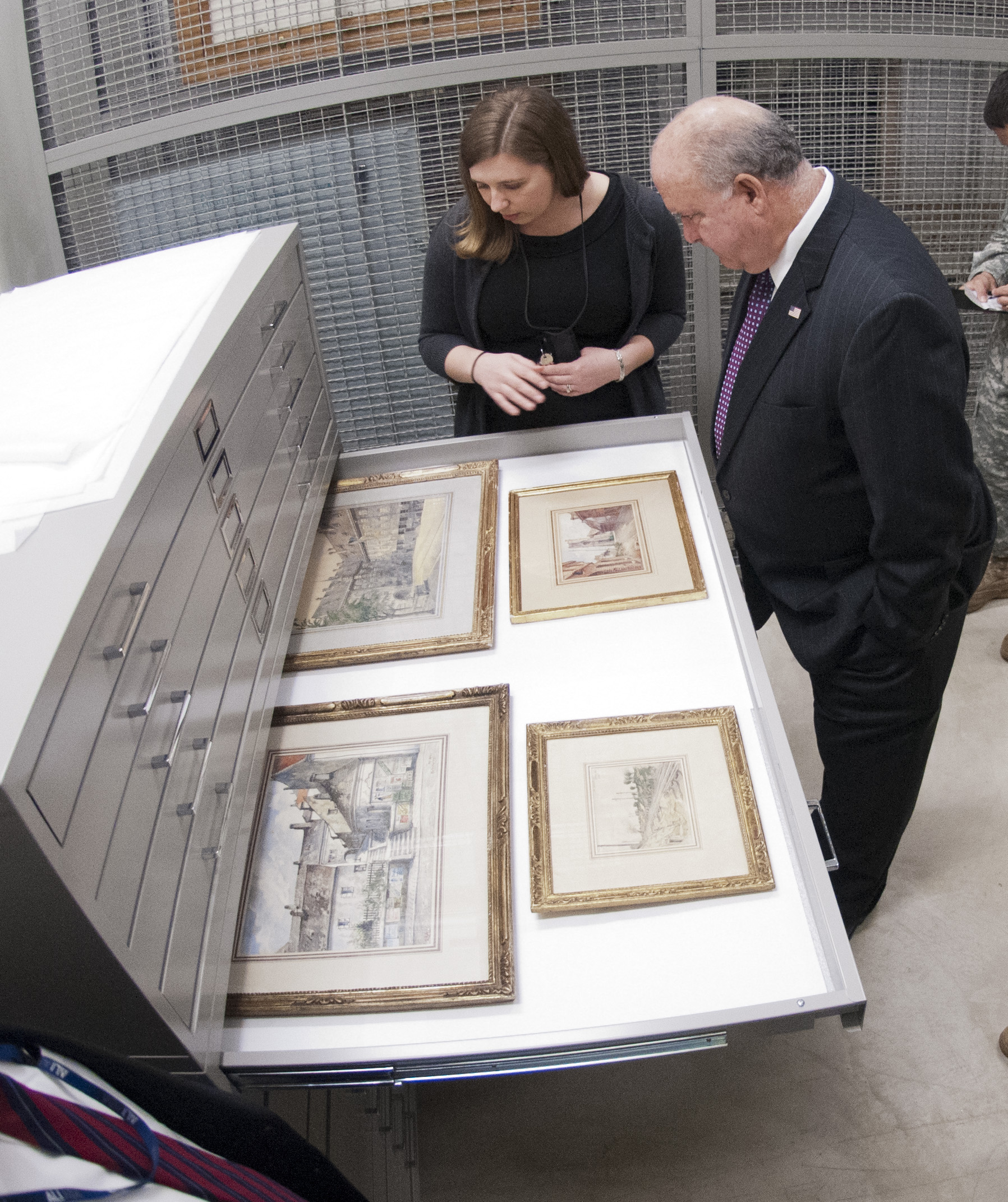
Watercolors by Adolf Hitler at the U.S. Army Center of Military History in May 2012. The paintings were cited in Price v. United States.

The center has a large collection of Nazi art and ephemera collected as part of Denazification efforts after the World War II. The holdings include four watercolor paintings by Adolf Hitler and several notable propaganda paintings depicting Hitler including In the Beginning Was the Word and The Standard Bearer.

Staff rides enable military leaders to retrace the course of a battle on the ground, deepening their understanding of the recurring fundamentals of military operations. As one of the army's major teaching devices, staff rides are particularly dependent on a careful knowledge of military history. Center historians lead rides directed by the Secretary of the Army and the Chief of Staff and attended by senior members of the army Staff.

It administers the army's Command History Program, to provide historical support to army organizations worldwide. In addition, since the first Persian Gulf War, the center has coordinated the deployment of military history detachments and the collection of historical data during peacekeeping and wartime operations, including those in northern Iraq, Somalia, Haiti, Bosnia, Kosovo, Afghanistan, and Iraq.

== Fellowships and publications ==
To stimulate interest in military history in the army and the nation, CMH sponsors professional programs.

- Fellowships: To encourage and support dissertations in military history by graduate students, the center offers up to four dissertation fellowships each academic year. These fellowships carry a $9,000 stipend and access to the center's facilities and expertise. Although the fellowship program broadly defines the history of war on land, it selects winners with a preference for topics on the history of the U.S. Army.
- Publications: The center has over 600 titles in its catalog. It is responsible for writing the official history of the U.S. Army. It is able to facilitate research, provide graphics and editorial support, and carry manuscripts through to publication.
- The center also publishes a quarterly history journal, Army History, known from 1983 to 1988 (No. 1 – No. 12) as The Army Historian. This award-winning magazine currently has a print run of over 10,000 copies and has been in circulation since 1983.

== Public relations ==
CMH's art and documents collections, library, and reference services are available to private researchers. Official priorities permitting, its historians, curators, and archivists advise researchers on military history and stand ready to share their expertise concerning the location of sources. The Collections Branch of the Museum Division arranges temporary loans of paintings and drawings from the Army Art Collection to private organizations that agree to display the art publicly in accordance with Army regulations. The army's museums and historical holdings throughout the country and abroad are generally open to the public, and their curators are available to answer reference questions. As a secured facility, as of 2016 requests for an appointment at Fort Lesley J. McNair must be made at least a week in advance.

== See also ==
- Lineage and honors certificate
- National Museum of the United States Army
- United States Army Art Program
