= Lineage and honors certificate =

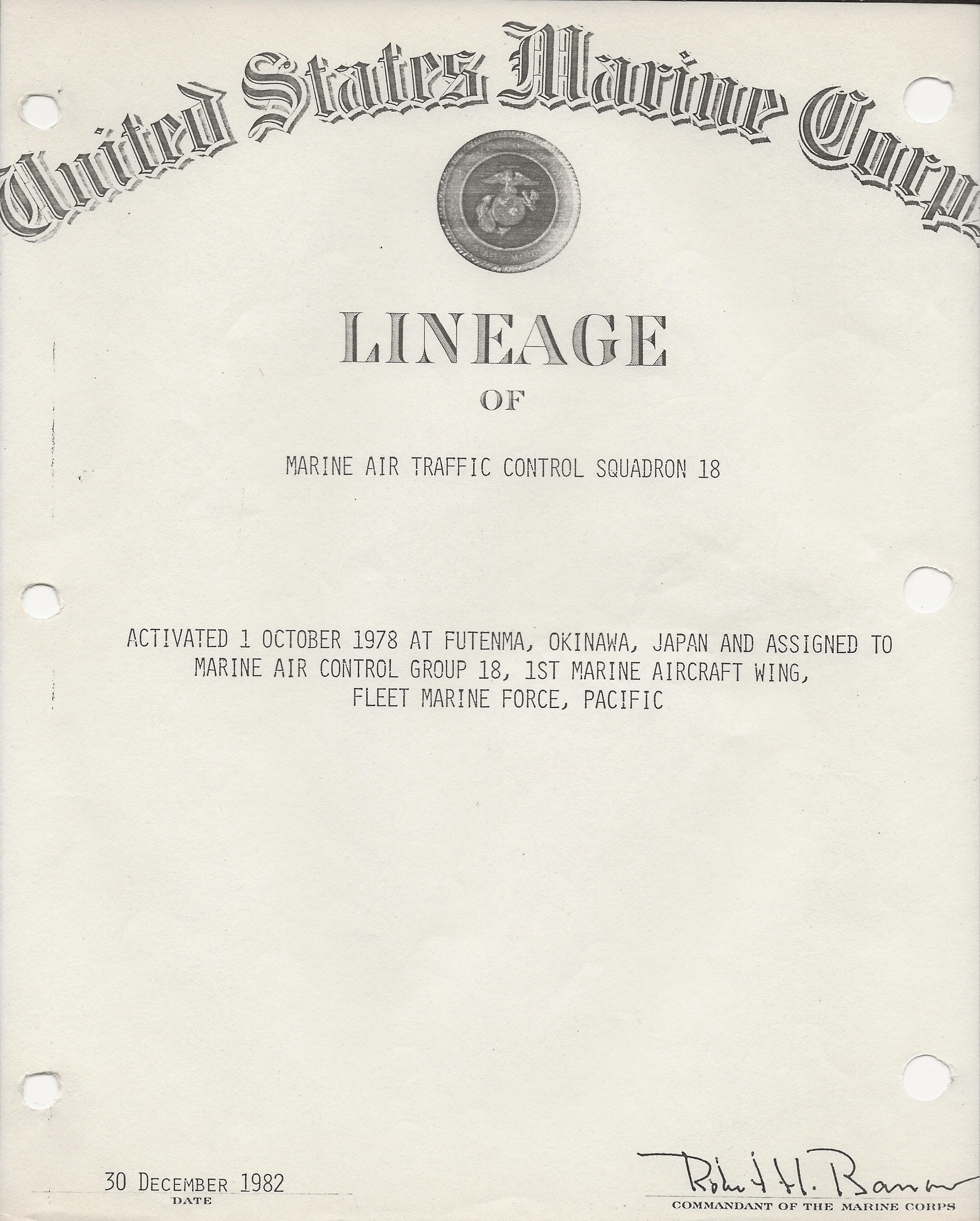
Lineage of Marine Air Traffic Control Squadron 18, 30 December 1982

A Lineage and Honors Certificate or "Lineage" is a stylized outline history of a unit. The Lineage establishes the continuity of a unit through various changes in designation and status, thereby verifying the unit's entitlement to honors, as well as heraldic items, unit historical property and files, and other tangible assets. A Lineage is not the operational history of a unit.

== United States Army ==
=== Glossary of lineage terms ===
- Activate. To transfer a constituted Regular Army or Army Reserve unit from the inactive to the active rolls of the United States Army. The unit is usually stationed at a specific location and assigned personnel and equipment at this time; however, a unit may be active at zero strength—that is, without personnel or equipment.
- Allot. To allocate a unit to one of the components of the United States Army. The present components are the Regular Army (RA), the Army National Guard (ARNG), and the Army Reserve (AR), formerly known as the Organized Reserves and Organized Reserve Corps. During World War I units were also allotted to the National Army, and during World War II the Army of the United States. An Army National Guard unit is usually further allotted to a particular state or group of states. A unit may be withdrawn from any component except the Army National Guard and allotted to another; the new allotment, however, does not change the history, lineage, and honors of the unit.
- Assign. To make a unit part of a larger organization and place it under that organization's command and control until it is relieved from the assignment. As a rule, only assignments to divisions and separate combined arms brigades are shown in unit lineages.
- Consolidate. To merge two or more units into a single unit. The unit may retain the designation of one of the former units or it may have a new designation, but it inherits the history, lineage, and honors of all of the former units. In the nineteenth century, consolidation was frequently a merger of several under-strength units to form one full-strength unit. At present time, in the Regular Army and the Army Reserve, units are usually consolidated when they are inactive or when only one of the units is active; therefore, personnel and equipment are seldom involved. In the Army National Guard, on the other hand, active units are often consolidated and their personnel are combined in the new unit.
- Constitute. To place the designation of a new unit on the official rolls of the United States Army.
- Convert. To transfer a unit from one branch of the Army to another—for example, from infantry to armor. Such a change always requires a redesignation; however, there is no break in the historical continuity of the unit. Active as well as inactive units may be converted, but if the unit is active, it must also be reorganized under a new table of organization and equipment (TOE).
- Demobilize. To remove the designation of a unit from the official rolls of the Army. If the unit is active, it must also be inactivated. This term is used in unit lineages only when referring to the period during and immediately after World War I.
- Designation. The official name of a unit, consisting usually of a number, a branch or function, and a command echelon, e.g., 145th Medical Battalion, 353d Civil Affairs Command, 1st Cavalry Division. Additional descriptive terms may appear in parentheses, but such parenthetical identifications are not part of the unit's official designation.
- Disband. To remove the designation of a Regular Army or Army Reserve unit from the official rolls of the United States Army. If the unit is active, it must also be inactivated. Disbandment is intended to be permanent and irreversible, except in extraordinary circumstances.
- Element. A unit that is assigned to or is part of a larger organization.
- Federally recognize. To accept an Army National Guard unit into the force structure of the United States Army after the unit has been inspected by a federal representative and found to be properly stationed, organized, and equipped in accordance with Army requirements.
- Inactivate. To place a Regular Army or Army Reserve unit that is not currently needed in the force structure in an inoperative status without assigned personnel or equipment for a limited period of time. The unit is transferred to the inactive rolls of the United States Army, but it can be activated again whenever needed. Its personnel and equipment are reassigned to one or more active units, but its historical records and properties are placed in storage. Upon reactivation, the unit retains its former history, lineage and honors, and it may retrieve its records and properties from storage. The term "inactivate" has been used only since 1921. Before that time, units either remained active or were removed from the rolls of the Army.
- Order into active federal service. To place an Army National Guard unit on full-time active duty under the control of the United States government. The unit remains in federal service until released by the federal government, at which time it reverts to the control of its home state or states.
- Order into active military service. To place an Army Reserve unit on full-time active duty, usually during a war or a major crisis, such as the Berlin crisis of 1961-62. After completing its active duty, the unit may be inactivated o it may be released from active military service, reverting to reserve status. This phrase does not apply to Army Reserve units on annual active duty for training.
- Organic element. A unit that is an integral part of a larger organization—for example, a lettered company of a battalion or regiment.
- Organize. To assign personnel and equipment to a unit and make it operative—that is, capable of performing its mission. For Army National Guard units, this term is used instead of activate (see above).
- Reconstitute. To restore to the official rolls of the United States Army a unit that has been disbanded, demobilized, or had its federal recognition withdrawn. The reconstituted unit may have a new designation, but it retains its former history, lineage, and honors.
- Redesignate. To change a unit's official name. Active as well as inactive units may be redesignated, but personnel and equipment of an active unit are not changed unless the unit is reorganized at the same time. Redesignation is a change of name only; the unit's history, lineage, and honors remain the same. (See also convert.)
- Reorganize. To change the structure of a unit in accordance with a new table of organization and equipment (TOE) within the same branch of the Army—for example, from mechanized to light infantry. When referring to the Army National Guard, this term also means to organize an active unit again.
- Withdraw federal recognition. To remove the designation of an Army National Guard unit from the official rolls of the United States Army. Federal recognition is withdrawn when the unit no longer meets Army
