= Military history detachment =

A military history detachment (MHD) is a unit in the United States Army responsible for collecting documentation of the army in military conflicts for future work by military historians in writing both official and unofficial histories of the Army. United States Army Center of Military History organizes these accounts. MHDs are authorized and given their mission statements by the Army Tables of Organization and Equipment (TOE). In their efforts to document wars, MHDs collect oral histories and operational documents to enable historians to write the official histories of U.S. military activities.

== Mission ==
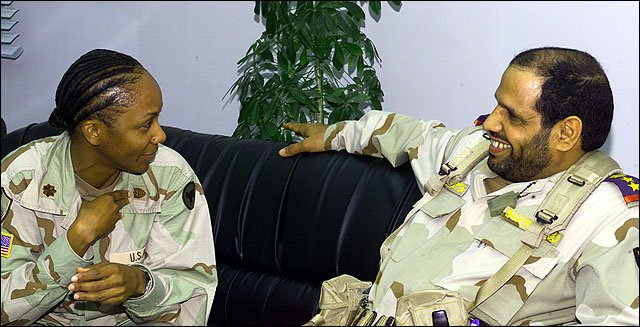
A Major from a Military History Detachment collecting an oral history from a Kuwaiti colonel about the War in Iraq

The mission of the Military History Detachments is to support the unit commander's history program; collect information in the operational environment to supplement and amplify the factual accounts of events as recorded by the organization; and assist in the documentation of unit operations.

== History ==
The military history detachments were first found in a form similar to contemporary units in the experimental "Intelligence and Historical Service units" of the World War II U.S. Army. First formed in April 1944, the U.S. Army formed nine of these units, which consisted of a senior historian, a lieutenant colonel, and a monograph unit consisting of one officer and two enlisted historian and a clerk typist. Along with this central group, a flexible number of contact teams with two enlisted and two commissioned historians helped the units collect materials. Additionally, 36 additional teams, many of which were documenting the Air Force, were formed. The Army committed about 300 personnel to historical units in general. These units were largely autonomous, writing histories based on the standards set by their commanding officers, which varied considerably.

After World War II the Office of the Chief Historian of the Army (OCMH) was formed to help organize the Historical efforts of the Army. Historical units were reorganized like many other post war units, many were deactivated, one remained in the Regular army and 26 units remained in the Army Reserve. These units, unlike their World War II predecessors focused largely on historical source collection, less on the production of manuscripts in support of the Office of the Chief Historian. By 1949, the historical units reorganized consisting of three teams, A, B, and C. The A team consisted of three historians, a clerk and a driver who supported theater historians. The A team would then supervise one or more B teams each of which would support a corps and consisted of a historian, a clerk and a driver, and a similar C team would support division historians.

After the outbreak of the Korean War, the Reserve units were disbanded and two A teams, six B teams and four C teams were organized. On 22 September 1950 the first MHD organized under a TOE structure was unveiled. However, poor support of the History units limited the effectiveness of the historical. In spite of that, there were some successes. Russell Gugeler, an MHD commander in Korea, was the lead author on the book Combat Actions in Korea. The units went through a major reorganization in 1963, and by 1970 thirty five detachments were formed, twenty six of which were operating in Vietnam. They were under the command of the theater commanders but were given training and support related to policies and types of activities from the OCMH. Since Vietnam, only 1 military history detachment has been maintained in the regular Army, the rest are components of the National Guard and Reserve and consist of one officer and two enlisted men.

The MHDs do not just cover combat zones. After the 23 March 1994 disaster at Fort Bragg's Green Ramp, the 44th MHD was tasked to assist in documenting the US Army's response to the incident. Their efforts were incorporated into Mary Condon-Rall's 1996 book Disaster on Green Ramp: The Army's Response.

By 1998, there were 22 MHDs in the U.S. Army, 16 of which were Reserve, 5 National Guard and 1 active duty. However, since 2008, the number has increased to 35 units.

== Number of Units ==
Currently there are 35 Military History Detachments located throughout the United States. Of the 35, 27 are assigned to the Army Reserve. There are 7 in the National Guard and there is 1 Active Duty MHD, the 44th which is located at Fort Bragg, NC.

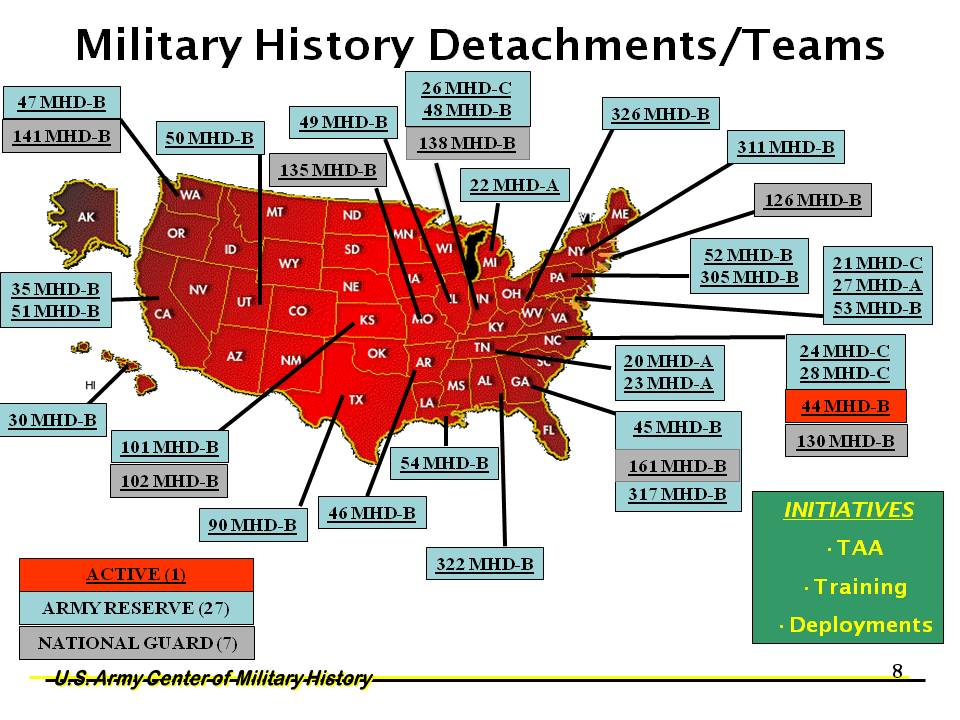

== Types of Units ==
Currently there are 3 types of Military History Detachments. The MHD Team A is a two-man detachment consisting of a Colonel (O-6) and Lieutenant Colonel (O-5). This unit is normally located at the Theater and Corps level Headquarters. The MHD Team B is a three-man unit consisting of a Major (O-4) and two NCOs, normally an E-7 and an E-6. The NCOs normally carry a Public Affairs Military Occupational Specialty (MOS) code. The Team B MHDs work at all levels, from the Brigade Combat Team (BCT) through the Division level and up to the Theater and Corps level. The third type of unit is the MHD Team C. The Team C normally work at the Division level. The Team A and Team C MHDs can augment the Team B MHDs at any level to provide a more concentrated collection effort.

== See also ==
- United States Army Center of Military History
