= The Standard Bearer (Lanzinger) =

Painting by Hubert Lanzinger

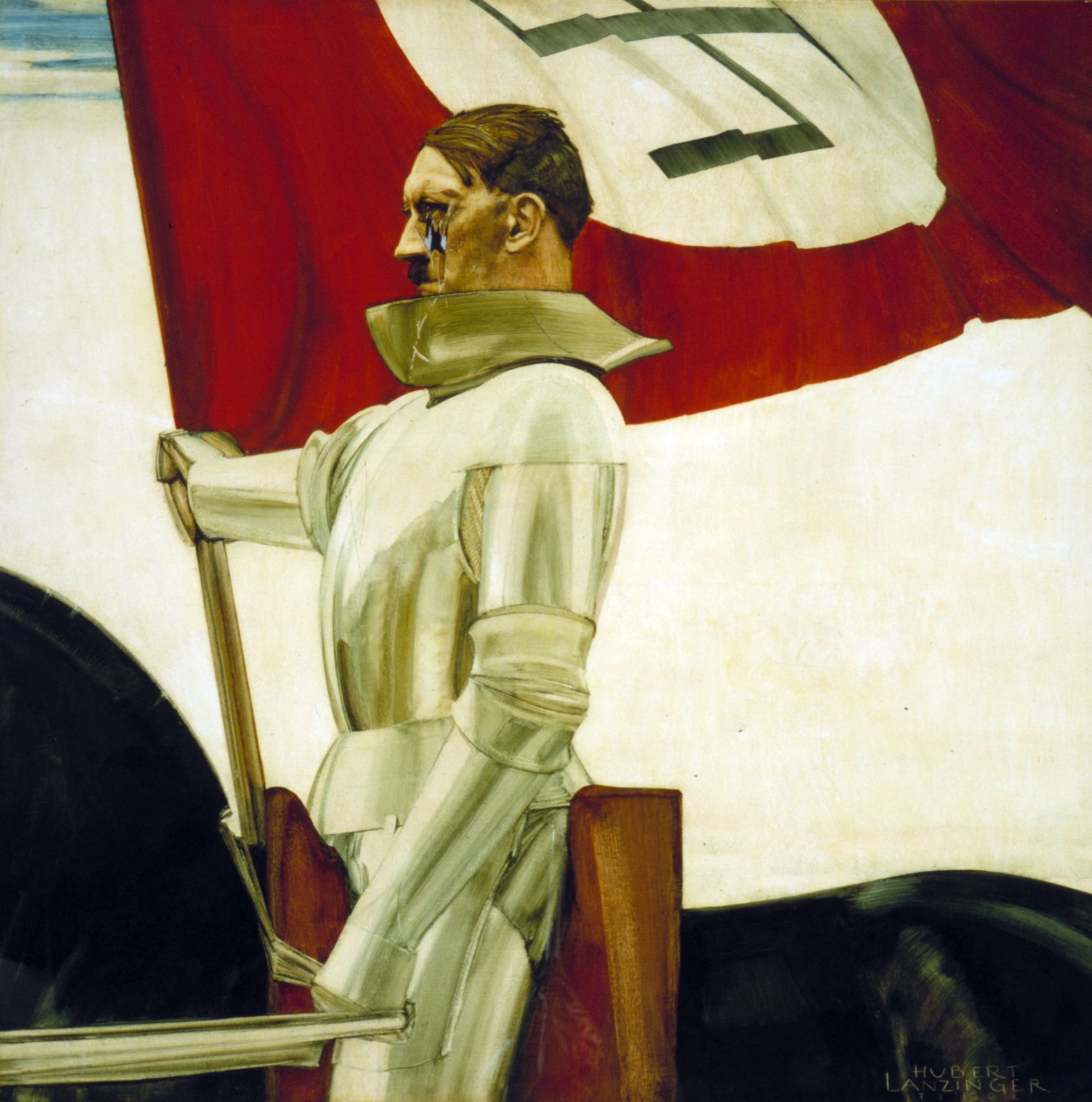
Der Bannerträger

Der Bannerträger (The Standard Bearer) is a painting by the Austrian artist Hubert Lanzinger of a stylized Adolf Hitler, the leader of the Nazi Party and German Führer.

The painting portrays Hitler sitting on a black horse, wearing armor in the manner of a 15th-century knight and carrying a Nazi flag that billows behind him. Hitler is portrayed as a messianic figure (maybe as Lohengrin) in the painting gazing symbolically towards a greater future for Germany.

It is an oil painting on wood and was completed between 1934 and 1936.

It was first publicly displayed at the Great German Art Exhibition in Munich in 1937. The Standard Bearer was made into a postcard by Heinrich Hoffmann in 1938. It is part of the collection of the United States Army Center of Military History in Washington, DC. It was one of 10,000 works of Nazi propaganda and German military art seized by the United States Army in the aftermath of World War II. The painting was damaged after the war by an American soldier who pierced it with a bayonet. The works were seized as part of efforts at denazification. It was included in the United States Holocaust Memorial Museum's travelling exhibition State of Deception: Power of Nazi Propaganda and displayed in the 1999 exhibition German Art of the Twentieth Century at the Altes Museum in Berlin.

In his 2019 book Culture in Nazi Germany Michael H. Kater described the painting as demonstrating "...the ludicrous nature of original Nazi German art beyond common definitions of kitsch, and the depth of evil that lurked behind it".
