= MATCS-18 =

US Marine Corps unit

Marine Air Traffic Control Squadron 18
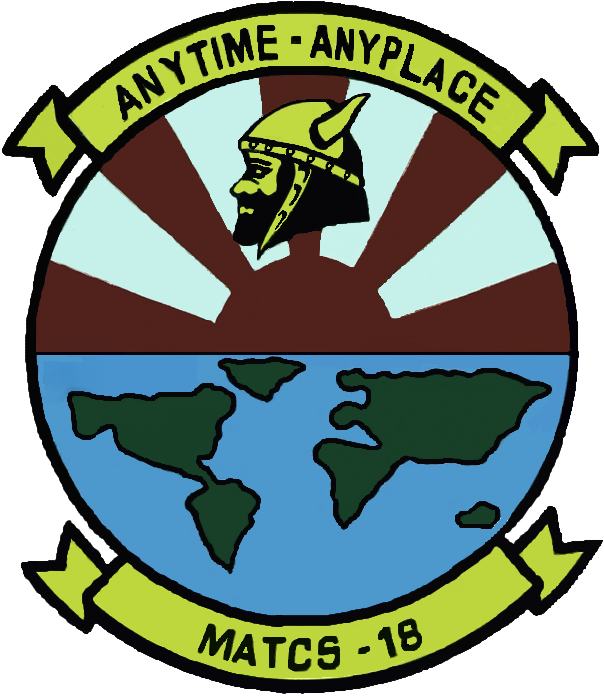
- MATCS-18 insignia
- Active: 1 Oct 1978 – 30 Sep 1994
- Country: United States of America
- Branch: United States Marine Corps
- Type: Air traffic control
- Size: 280
- Part of: Inactive
- Motto(s): "Any Time, Any Place"

Commanders
- Current commander: N/A

Marine Air Traffic Control Squadron 18 (MATCS-18) was a United States Marine Corps aviation command and control squadron responsible for providing continuous, all-weather air traffic control services for the 1st Marine Aircraft Wing throughout the Pacific region. MATCS-18 was formed by consolidating four, regionally aligned Marine Air Traffic Control Units under one command to better integrate them with the Marine Air Command and Control System. The squadron was headquartered at Marine Corps Air Station Futenma, Okinawa, Japan and fell under the command of Marine Air Control Group 18. MATCS-18 was decommissioned in September 1994 and the air traffic control detachments were placed under the command of Marine Air Control Squadron 4.

== Organization ==
- Headquarters - MCAS Futenma, Okinawa, Japan (Formerly MATCU-66)
- Detachment A - MCAS Iwakuni, Japan (formerly MATCU-60 & MATCU-62)
- Detachment B - MCAS Kaneohe Bay, Hawaii (formerly MATCU-70)
- Detachment C - Marine Corps Air Ground Combat Center Twentynine Palms, California

== Mission ==
Provide continuous, all weather, radar/non-radar, approach, departure, enroute and tower air traffic control services to friendly aircraft.

== History ==
MATCS-18 was commissioned on 1 October 1978, at MCAS Futenma, Okinawa, Japan. The squadron was formed by aligning all of the Marine Air Traffic Control Units (MATCU) in the 1st Marine Aircraft Wing underneath one commander. The squadron was originally organized and equipped to deploy as a task organized detachment capable of providing the full range of ATC services from short duration, VFR service at a single airfield to extended IFR operations at three expeditionary airfields. The table of organization for the squadron had 29 officers, 259 Marines and 2 Navy corpsmen. MATCS-18 Detachment B in Hawaii worked under a different command arrangement because of its geographic distance from the rest of the squadron. Det B operationally reported to Marine Air Control Squadron 2 (MACS-2) in order to best support 1st Marine Brigade operations.

During the 1980s the squadron's detachments supported training exercises throughout the Indo-Pacific Theater. Among the exercises regularly supported were Cope Thunder in Alaska, Cobra Gold in Thailand, and Team Spirit in South Korea. The squadron also regularly supported exercises at Naval Air Station Cubi Point, Philippines, Naval Air Station Atsugi, Japan and Pohang Airport, South Korea.

In 1990, Detachment B deployed to Saudi Arabia in support of the Operation Desert Shield/Desert Strom. The detachment established an Air Traffic Control tower and TACAN detachment at the Ras Al Ghar military port. The detachment also provided ATC services at a Forward arming and refuelling point (FARP) near Manifa Bay, Saudi Arabia.

The squadron sent a TACAN detachment to Naval Air Station Agana, Guam in order to help provide support to the island after Typhoon Omar. The next month the squadron provided controllers to Barking Sands on Kauai to help support relief efforts after Hurricane Iniki.

MATCS-18 was decommissioned on 30 September 1994, at a ceremony aboard MCAS Futenma. The squadron's ATC detachments were reorganized under Marine Air Control Squadron 4.

== Unit awards ==
A unit citation or commendation is an award bestowed upon an organization for the action cited. Members of the unit who participated in said actions are allowed to wear on their uniforms the awarded unit citation. MATCS-18 was presented with the following awards:

Streamer	Award	Year(s)	Additional Info
A green streamer with red, gold, and blue horizontal stripes	Meritorious Unit Commendation Streamer with two Bronze Stars	1982-1984, 1985–87, 1989-91	
	National Defense Service Streamer with one Bronze Star	1990-91	Gulf War

== See also ==
- United States Marine Corps Aviation
- List of United States Marine Corps aviation support units
