= Army Heritage Center Foundation =

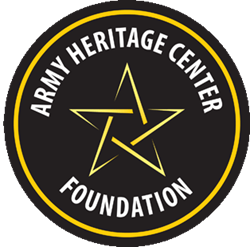
The Army Heritage Center Foundation Logo

The Army Heritage Center Foundation (AHCF) originally named The Military Heritage Foundation, is a charitable organization, 501(c)(3) nonprofit dedicated to sharing the stories of U.S. Army soldiers from all eras, fostering understanding and building meaningful connections between the military and civilian communities. The Foundation accomplishes its mission through public outreach, community-building, resource-sharing, education, and philanthropic investments in the preservation of Army history through the biographical lens of the American Soldier.

The primary beneficiary of the Army Heritage Center Foundation's philanthropic contributions is the U.S. Army Heritage and Education Center (USAHEC) in historic Carlisle, Pennsylvania. The Foundation has supported the center for over a quarter century, beginning in 1999 when then-Secretary of the Army Louis Caldera authorized the center's creation. Since then, the Foundation has helped the Center grow into the 56-acre campus it is today.

AHCF is separate from the U.S. Army Heritage and Education Center. As a private, nonprofit, non-Federal entity, AHCF is not affiliated with the Department of Defense and has no governmental status.

== Mission ==
The mission of the Army Heritage Center Foundation is 1) to inform and educate the American public about the contributions of the American Soldier and the U.S. Army to our nation's history and 2) to support the development and expansion of the U.S. Army Heritage and Education Center (USAHEC) and its programs.

== History ==
The Army Heritage Center Foundation was launched in 1999 as the “Military Heritage Foundation.” That same year, then-Secretary of the Army Louis Caldera committed the U.S. Army to “the establishment of an Academic Research Facility and Army Museum at the U.S. Army War College, Carlisle Barracks, Pennsylvania.” The Military Heritage Foundation was incorporated as a nonprofit and granted the authority to undertake the construction of the Army Museum. Its first action was to facilitate the transfer of 56 acres of land adjacent to Carlisle Barracks from Cumberland County, Pennsylvania to the U.S. Army so that planning for and construction of the new museum could begin. In 2002, to more closely align with the mission of the facility, The Military Heritage Foundation formally began doing business as the Army Heritage Center Foundation.

The name change allowed the Army Heritage Center Foundation to reflect the primary focus of its first few decades: building and supporting the U.S. Army Heritage and Education Center (USAHEC). The Foundation collaborated with the Army to develop a center that honors Soldiers and their families by preserving and making available for study artifacts, manuscripts, personal papers, photographs, and art from USAHEC's collections, along with fostering a greater awareness of U.S. Army History.

In 2003, AHCF funded the master planning and utility infrastructure of USAHEC. A year later, Ridgway Hall, which is a federally funded construction project that houses the Army’s premier library, archive and research facility, opened to the public. By 2006, the Foundation began fundraising and design work for the Visitor and Education Center.

Later in 2010, the Foundation completed construction of the Visitor and Education Center and donated the building to the U.S. Army. The next year, The Museum Store, sponsored by the Foundation, opened. In 2011, the Foundation built additional infrastructure and parking lots to accommodate future construction.

In 2013, the Foundation hosted its first U.S. Army Birthday Dinner at the U.S. Army Heritage and Education Center. In 2016, AHCF completed construction of both the Ridgway Hall Lobby renovation to accommodate additional exhibits and the Hall of the American Soldier, transferring both to the U.S. Army.

In 2019, AHCF funded and constructed an Outdoor Event Pavilion on the Center grounds.

== Programs ==
In 2018, the AHCF began ROTC Staff rides to Gettysburg in coordination with orientations and tours of USAHEC. In 2025, the AHCF launched the Donald Esper Endowment, which funded the ROTC Staff Ride program. This endowment allows the program to expand to Antietam and ensures that ROTC cadets will receive training in the important turning points in U.S. Army history.

As part of its fundraising efforts, the AHCF hosts several annual dinners. Its first Annual Membership Dinner took place in the fall of 2009, and over the years, has honored Soldiers, individuals, and organizations that have supported and strengthened the nation. In 2024, AHCF awarded The Honorable Tom Corbett its Boots on the Ground award.

On June 14, 2025, AHCF helped celebrate the Army’s 250th Birthday with an Army Birthday Dinner.

In order to fulfill their mission of educating the public, AHCF supports online and community outreach programs that share 250 years of Army Soldier Stories.

== Publications ==
To supplement AHEC's educational programming, the foundation has produced the following publications, all of which are available in the Museum Store at AHEC, which the foundation also operates.

The Eye of the Army: A Photographic Exhibit

This is an interactive, educational CD-ROM that brings American history from the 1850s to the 1960s alive through images from the Military History Institute and artifacts from the U.S. Army Heritage and Education Center.

Defending the Long Road to Freedom

This is an interactive CD-ROM focusing on the African American community's experience within the U.S. Army. The centerpiece of the story is the 50-year Army career of Brigadier General Benjamin O. Davis Sr., the first African American promoted to General Officer rank in the United States Armed Forces.

Army Nurses of World War One: Service Beyond Expectations

More than 21,000 women enlisted in the U.S. Army during World War I to serve as uniformed nurses. Nearly half of them served in overseas locations. Their little-known story is presented through the writings of two of these brave women, Elizabeth Lewis and Emma Elizabeth Weaver.

Designing for Victory 1914-1945

This educational CD-ROM examines the role of posters as vital tools of communication on the home front during World War I and World War II. The disk includes a selection of vintage posters from both wars and features designs from the United States, as well as Germany, Great Britain, France, Canada, and Russia.

Service in the 195th Pennsylvania Infantry Regiment: The Diary of Captain Samuel McPherran

Having served two years in the Army and being discharged due to injury, McPherran recruited men from Huntingdon County, Pennsylvania, and joined them in the 195th in the fall of 1864. This booklet is a transcription of the diary he kept during his service in the 195th, along with annotations.

Understanding War Through Imagery: The Civil War in American Memory

This photograph booklet is a companion piece for the Civil War photograph exhibit on display in Ridgway Hall. The majority of the photographs are culled from the AHCF's expansive MOLLUS Civil War photo collection.

== Honors ==
In 2025, the Army Heritage Center Foundation was honored by the Central Pennsylvania Business Journal with an Empowering Women Award for its efforts to support and empower women in the workplace. In that same year, AHCF President Julie Germany was named a 2025 Women of Influence honoree by Central Penn Business Journal.

== Awards ==
The Army Heritage Center Foundation gives awards to individuals and/or groups throughout the year. These include the “Living Legend Award,” “Boots on the Ground Award” and “General McCarthy Award”.

In addition, AHCF provides an annual Professor Russell F. Weigley Award, which is given in memory of Russell F. Weigley, a distinguished military historian. The award recognizes students who present the best military history-focused paper at the annual Barnes Club Conference in Philadelphia, PA.

AHCF awards an annual LTC John William Whitman Research Grant to provide monetary support to unfunded independent researchers who are working on under-explored topics of military history. Funded research is to be conducted at the U.S. Army Heritage and Education Center (USAHEC) in Carlisle, Pa.

== National Advisory Council ==
The Army Heritage Center Foundation appoints members to its National Advisory Council, which helps the organization bridge connections to potential donors and others who may be able to assist in fulfilling its mission. Members of the National Advisory Council include Gregory Attorri, The Honorable Haley Barbour, General Frederick M. Franks Jr., George Fischer, Derek Leo, Colonel Walter “Joe” Marm, LTG H.R. McMaster, whose appointment was covered by the media, and General David Petraeus.

Previous members of the National Advisory Council include The Honorable Tom Ridge, author Joe Galloway, and actor Barry Pepper.

== Board of Directors ==
The Army Heritage Center Foundation is governed by an elected Board of Directors, who also support AHCF through fundraising and awareness. Currently Colonel Bob DeSousa USA, Retired serves as the board chair and Lee Woolley serves as the Vice Chair.
