= U.S. Army Heritage and Education Center =

Coordinates: 40.2075°N 77.1600°W

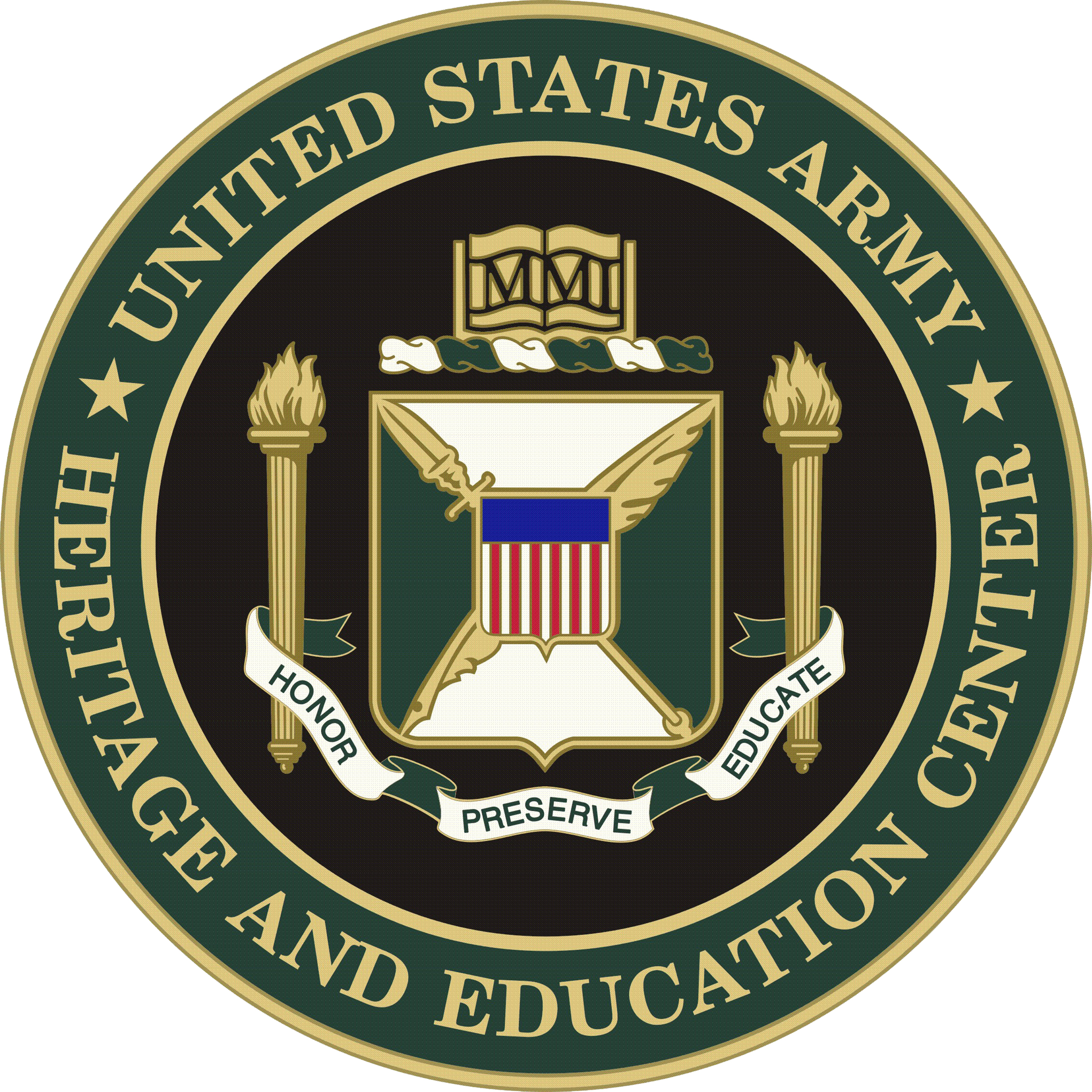
Seal of the U.S. Army Heritage and Education Center

The United States Army Heritage and Education Center (USAHEC), at Carlisle Barracks, Pennsylvania, is the U.S. Army's primary historical research facility. Formed in 1999 and reorganized in 2013, the center consists of the Military History Institute (MHI), the Army Heritage Museum (AHM), the Historical Services Division (HSD), Visitor and Education Services (VES), the U.S. Army War College Library, and Collections Management (CM). The U.S. Army Heritage and Education Center is part of the United States Army War College, but has its own 56-acre (230,000 m^{2}) campus.

The Heritage and Education Center makes available contemporary and historical materials related to strategic leadership, the global application of Landpower, and U.S. Army Heritage to inform research, educate an international audience, and honor Soldiers, past and present.

The current research collection contains military history books, military newspapers, technical and field manuals, periodicals, veteran's surveys, photographs, and transcribes oral histories. The collections include material from as early as the Revolutionary War to current U.S. Army operations. The USAHEC also provides interpretive exhibits and educational outreach programs to foster a greater understanding of the Army's central role in the growth, development and protection of the nation and its way of life. The USAHEC motto is "Telling the Army story, one Soldier at a time."

== History ==
The U.S. Army Military History Institute pre-dates the U.S. Army Heritage and Education Center by over 30 years. Formed in 1967 as the Military History Research Collection, a branch of the U.S. Army War College Library, the institute became the primary repository for unofficial Army historical materials. Official U.S. Army records and other materials belong to the National Archives. For most of its existence, the institute was housed in Upton Hall on Carlisle Barracks. Built in 1941 as an academic building for the Medical Field Service School, Upton Hall was adequate as a library but ill-suited for the size and preservation needs of a major archive.

Secretary of the Army Louis Caldera formed the Army Heritage and Education Center in June 1999 as a means of bringing an Army museum to Carlisle and promoting the holdings of the institute. His successor Thomas E. White approved the construction of a new facility, the present-day Ridgway Hall, in 2001. He stated:

"We will relocate its [the institute's] documents and holdings—the unofficial history of the United States Army—into a newly built archive, give that facility responsibility for administering historical documents and photographs Army wide, and associate it with an educational facility and a museum".

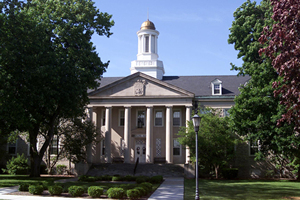
The U.S. Army Military History Institute resided in Upton Hall, on Carlisle Barracks, from 1967 to 2004.

The center, including the holdings of the institute, relocated from Upton Hall to Ridgway Hall in 2004, officially opening on September 24. The Army named the building for former Army Chief of Staff General Matthew B. Ridgway (1895–1993), commander of the 82nd Airborne Division in World War II and of United Nations forces in the Korean War.

The Army Heritage Museum, formed with the center in 1999, held its artifacts mostly in storage in various places on Carlisle Barracks before the construction of its Interim Storage Facility beside Ridgway Hall in 2004.

By 2005, the center created the Army Heritage Trail and began placing historical markers and large artifacts such as tanks and field artillery on display for public view. The first permanent structures, the Civil War cabins, officially opened in October of that year.

In 2009, the USAHEC broke ground for the Visitor and Education Center as plans for the growth of the campus continued. In May 2011, the Center opened to the public and serves as the welcome and orientation site for all visitors to the campus. The building features a 7,000-square-foot (650 m^{2}) exhibit space and two multipurpose rooms for conferences and other presentations. Later in the year, the USAHEC opened the Conservation Facility to house and preserve the U.S. Army's artifact collection.

In 2026, USAHEC became a subordinate organization of the U.S. Army Center of Military History and Army University.

== Campus ==
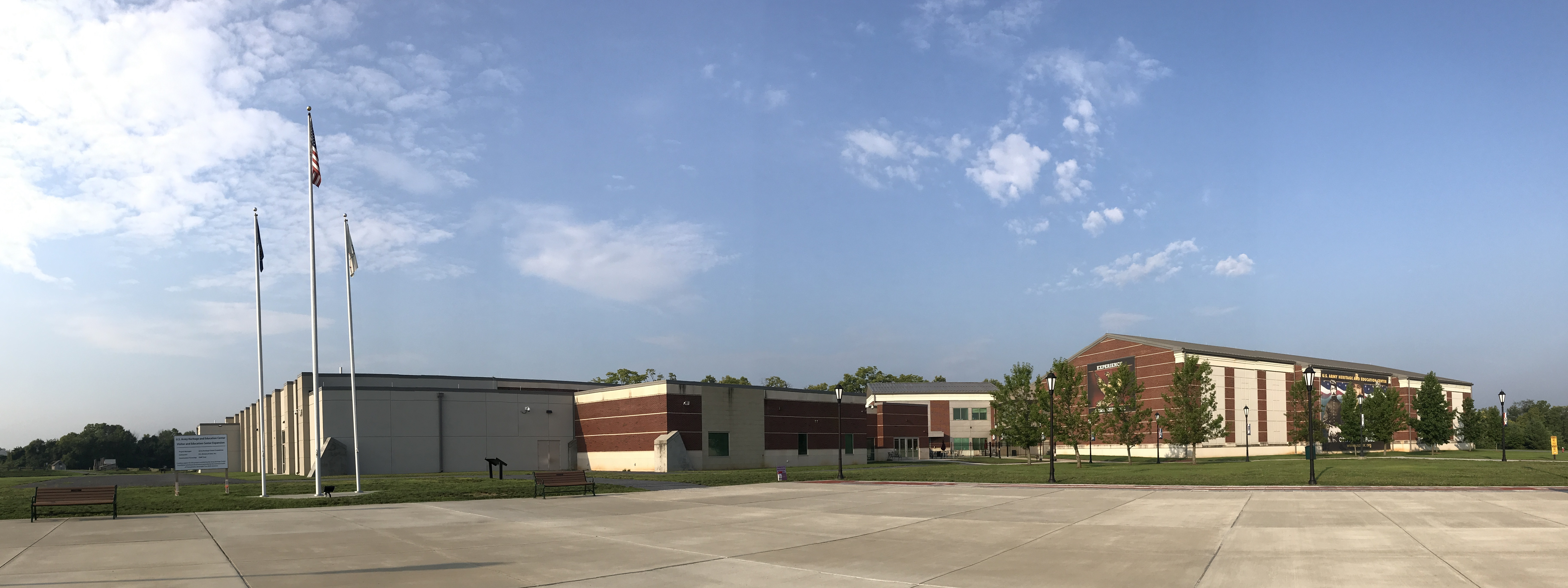
The Visitor and Education Center and Ridgway Hall on the campus of the U.S. Army Heritage and Education Center in Carlisle, Pennsylvania.

The U.S. Army Heritage and Education Center consists of the following buildings: the Visitor and Education Center, Ridgway Hall, the Conservation Facility, and the Fabrication Facility. The campus also includes a one-mile (1.6 km) outdoor Army Heritage Trail. The Trail consists of macro-exhibits showcasing various periods of the U. S. Army's history.

=== Ridgway Hall Library ===
Named after Army Chief of Staff General Matthew B. Ridgway (1895–1993), commander of the 82nd Airborne Division in World War II and of United Nations forces in the Korean War, Ridgway Hall opened to the public in 2004. Home of the Military History Institute, the 66,000-square-foot (6,100 m^{2}) hall holds over 15 million items (books, periodicals, manuscripts, photographs, military publications) on U.S. Army history, covering the Revolutionary War era to current operations. The collections also include one of the largest American Civil War photograph collection in the world.

Along with a reading room for researchers, the hall also has several small exhibits that display artifacts and photographs from USAHEC holdings. Currently, the Ridgway Hall exhibits include the General Omar Nelson Bradley Memorial Art Gallery, which features rotating art exhibits and an exhibit showcasing the highlights of the USAHEC Collection. The "Treasures of the USAHEC" exhibit highlights many types of materials, collected since 1967, which comprise USAHEC's current historical holdings. Objects on display were selected due to their distinctive nature or because they provide a unique perspective on the history of the U.S. Army, as well as what Soldiers found important about themselves, their units, the people they met, and the places where they served.

Staff in Ridgway Hall oversee the cataloging of books and other items, the processing of archival collections, the transcription of oral histories, the writing of research bibliographies and other finding aids, and patron and visitor services.

=== Visitor and Education Center ===
The Visitor and Education Center opened in May 2011 to the general public. It serves as the welcome and orientation site for visitors to the facility. The building includes a 7,000-square-foot (650 m^{2}) museum exhibit space, currently featuring "The Soldier Experience," a museum store, and two large multipurpose rooms for conferences and lectures.

"The Soldier Experience" is located in the Visitor and Education Center (VEC) of the USAHEC campus and is open during normal business hours.

The exhibit also features artifacts, oral history recordings accessible from your smart phone, a movie theater, and the opportunity to write a letter to a currently serving Soldier. In addition, guests may test their marksmanship at the digital shooting range, parachute in to Normandy as part of the D-Day invasion, and experience a night attack during the Korean War.

=== Conservation Facility and Collections Management ===
The 35,000-square-foot (3,300 m^{2}) museum conservation facility holds the Army Heritage Museum's artifacts and serves as the curatorial work space. The Conservation Facility is not open to the public. The building provides climate controlled storage and contains objects, paper, analytical, and digital laboratories. The staff of the Collections Management team facilitate the development and preservation of the USAHEC collection by acquiring, conserving, and administering historical materials. The team is responsible for the growth and maintenance of the collection to ensure they are relevant and available for usage. The acquisitions section constantly adds new items to the collection through the donation of historical materials. The USAHEC purchases the newest publications and books to add to its extensive library collections.

=== Army Heritage Trail ===
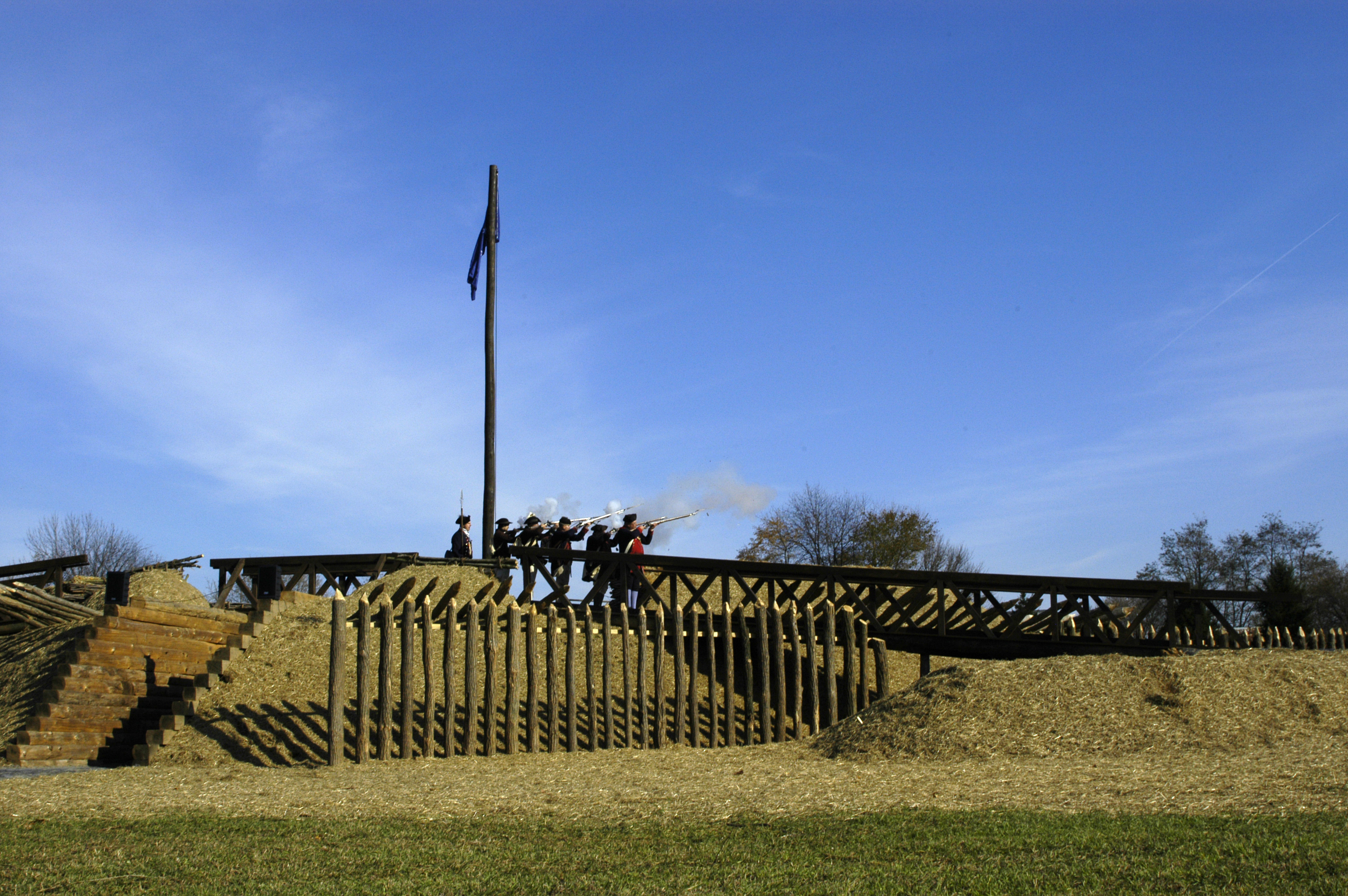
Re-enactors fire from an American Revolutionary War redoubt on the Army Heritage Trail. It is a replica of Redoubt 10, a British redoubt seized by Continental Army troops at the Siege of Yorktown on October 14, 1781.

The Army Heritage Trail, a one-mile (1.6 km) walking path of outdoor exhibits and markers on various eras in U.S. Army history. Notable exhibits include:

- Replica American Revolutionary War redoubt from the 1781 Siege of Yorktown,
- Way-station cabin built to resemble those of the French and Indian War
- Cabins representing an American Civil War winter encampment
- World War II induction center
- Recreation of a western front trench system from World War I, shellhole-marked no-man's land, and a corresponding German pillbox.
- Vietnam War firebase with two 105 mm howitzers – M101 howitzer & M102 howitzer, M42 Duster Anti-Aircraft weapon, Bell UH-1 Iroquois helicopter, a guard tower, and defensive berm
- M4 Sherman Tank, M60 Patton Main Battle Tank, Bell AH-1 Cobra helicopter, Pak 43/41 88 mm German World War II-era artillery cannon, 12-pounder Napoleon Civil War-era cannon, and many other vehicles and weapons

The Army Heritage Trail is open for visitation dawn to dusk daily. The buildings and structures on the trail are only open when the USAHEC buildings are open.

=== Events and Programs ===
The USAHEC hosts many types of history events, including lectures, large and small living history events, workshops, education programs, and more. In past years, the USAHEC has hosted Army Heritage Days in recognition of Armed Forces Day in the United States. The event features re-enactors from all eras of U.S. Army history occupying the Army Heritage Trail, and various displays and demonstrations allow the public to interact with the living historians. Other events have had many different military history themes; in 2009 and 2010 a late-summer event included 18th and 19th century U.S. Army history concentrating on the American Revolution. In 2011, the theme was the sesquicentennial of the first winter of the American Civil War.

== Affiliated organizations ==
The U.S. Army Heritage and Education Center is supported by a private non-profit foundation, the Army Heritage Center Foundation, which helps the center with development and educational efforts. It oversaw fundraising for the construction of the Visitor and Education Center and is raising funds for the Army Heritage Center Facility.

== See also ==
- Military history of the United States
- Ruth E. Hodge, U.S. Army War College Library (1960–1980), U.S. Army Military History Institute (1980–1993); archivist (retired), Pennsylvania State Archives; and author, Guide to African American Resources at the Pennsylvania State Archives (Pennsylvania Historical and Museum Commission, 2000, ISBN 978-0-8927-1087-4)
