= Financial Times Business Book of the Year Award =

Annual business book award established in 2005

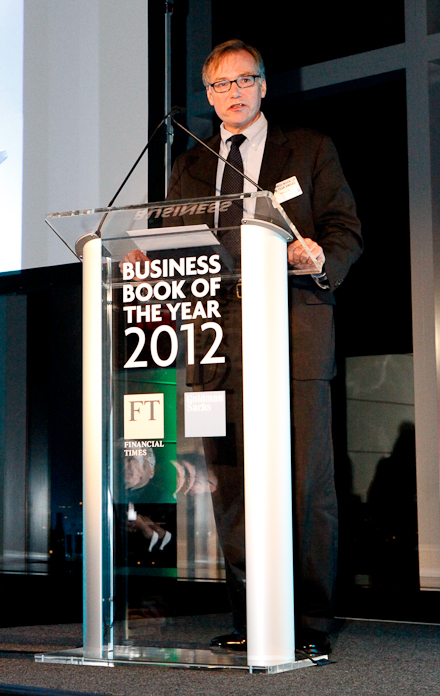
- 2012 winner Steve Coll
- Awarded for: Best business book of the year
- Sponsored by: Financial Times (2005–present); Schroders (2023–present); McKinsey & Company (2014–2021); Goldman Sachs (2005–2013)
- Location: London
- Country: England
- Presented by: Financial Times
- Hosted by: Financial Times
- Reward: £30,000
- First award: 2005; 21 years ago
- Currently held by: Stephen Witt for The Thinking Machine: Jensen Huang, Nvidia, and the World’s Most Coveted Microchip (2025)
- Website: www.ft.com/bookaward

Financial Times Business Book of the Year Award is an annual award given to the best business book of the year as determined by the Financial Times. It aims to find the book that has "the most compelling and enjoyable insight into modern business issues". The award was established in 2005 and is worth £30,000. Beginning in 2010, five short-listed authors each receive £10,000, an increase from the previous £5,000.

The award's principal partner was Goldman Sachs from 2005 to 2013, when it was known as the "Financial Times and Goldman Sachs Business Book of the Year Award". McKinsey & Company supported the Business Book Award from 2014 until 2021, when it was known as the "Financial Times and McKinsey Business Book of the Year Award".

Since 2014, the Financial Times Business Book of the Year Award is presented at the same time as the Bracken Bower Prize for young business writers.

== Winners and shortlist ==
Blue Ribbon = winner

=== 2005 ===
The shortlist was announced 20 September 2005, and the winner announced 24 November 2005.

- John Battelle, The Search: How Google and Its Rivals Rewrote the Rules of Business and Transformed Our Culture
- Steven Levitt and Stephen Dubner, Freakonomics: A Rogue Economist Explores the Hidden Side of Everything
- Thomas Friedman, The World Is Flat: A Brief History of the Twenty-First Century
- Constantinos C. Markides, Paul Geroski, Fast Second: How Smart Companies Bypass Radical Innovation to Enter and Dominate New Markets
- Pietra Rivoli, The Travels of a T-Shirt in the Global Economy: An Economist Examines the Markets, Power and Politics of World Trade
- James B. Stewart, DisneyWar

=== 2006 ===
The shortlist was announced 18 September 2006, and the winner announced 27 October 2006.

- Chris Anderson, The Long Tail: Why the Future of Business is Selling Less of More
- Bo Burlingham, Small Giants: Companies that Choose to Be Great Instead of Big
- Charles Fishman, The Wal-Mart Effect: How the World's Most Powerful Company Really Works—and How It's Transforming the American Economy
- James Kynge, China Shakes The World: A Titan's Rise and Troubled Future – and the Challenge for America
- Marc Levinson, The Box: How the Shipping Container Made the World Smaller and the World Economy Bigger

=== 2007 ===
The shortlist was announced 25 September 2007, and the winner announced 25 October 2007.

- William D. Cohan, The Last Tycoons: The Secret History of Lazard Frères & Co.
- Alan Greenspan, The Age of Turbulence: Adventures in a New World
- Philippe Legrain, Immigrants: Your Country Needs Them
- Nassim Nicholas Taleb, The Black Swan: The Impact of the Highly Improbable
- Don Tapscott and Anthony D. Williams, Wikinomics: How Mass Collaboration Changes Everything
- Iain Carson and Vijay Vaitheeswaran, ZOOM: The Global Race to Fuel the Car of the Future

=== 2008 ===
The shortlist was announced 18 September 2008 and the winner announced 14 October 2008.

- William J. Bernstein, A Splendid Exchange: How Trade Shaped the World
- Tim Bouquet & Byron Ousey, Cold Steel: The Multi-billion-dollar Battle for a Global Industry
- Mohamed El-Erian, When Markets Collide: Investment Strategies for the Age of Global Economic Change
- Misha Glenny, McMafia: A Journey Through the Global Criminal Underworld
- Lawrence Lessig, Remix: Making Art and Commerce Thrive in the Hybrid Economy
- Alice Schroeder, The Snowball: Warren Buffett and the Business of Life

=== 2009 ===
The longlist was announced 12 August 2009, the shortlist announced around 18 September 2009, and the winner announced 29 October 2009.

- Liaquat Ahamed, Lords of Finance: The Bankers Who Broke the World
- Stephen Green, Good Value: Reflections on Money, Morality and an Uncertain World
- Nandan Nilekani, Imagining India: The Idea of a Renewed Nation
- Frank Partnoy, The Match King
- George Akerlof and Robert Shiller, Animal Spirits: How Human Psychology Drives the Economy, and Why It Matters for Global Capitalism
- David Wessel, In Fed We Trust

=== 2010 ===
The longlist was announced 9 August 2010, the shortlist was announced 16 September 2010, and the winner announced 19 October 2010.

- Sheena Iyengar, The Art of Choosing
- David Kirkpatrick, The Facebook Effect: The Inside Story of the Company That Is Connecting the World
- Michael Lewis, The Big Short: Inside the Doomsday Machine
- Sebastian Mallaby, More Money Than God: Hedge Funds and the Making of a New Elite
- Raghuram G. Rajan, Fault Lines: How Hidden Fractures Still Threaten the World Economy
- Andrew Ross Sorkin, Too Big to Fail: The Inside Story of How Wall Street and Washington Fought to Save the Financial System – and Themselves

=== 2011 ===
The longlist was announced on 9 August 2011, the shortlist was announced on 14 September and the winner was announced on 3 November 2011.

- Abhijit V. Banerjee and Esther Duflo, Poor Economics: A Radical Rethinking of the Way to Fight Global Poverty
- Barry Eichengreen, Exorbitant Privilege: The Rise and Fall of the Dollar and the Future of the International Monetary System
- Edward Glaeser, Triumph of the City: How Our Greatest Invention Makes Us Richer, Smarter, Greener, Healthier, and Happier
- Margaret Heffernan, Willful Blindness: Why We Ignore the Obvious at Our Peril
- Richard Rumelt, Good Strategy Bad Strategy: The Difference and Why It Matters
- Daniel Yergin, The Quest: Energy, Security, and the Remaking of the Modern World

=== 2012 ===
The shortlist was announced on 13 September 2012. The winner was announced on 2 November 2012.

- Daron Acemoglu and James A. Robinson, Why Nations Fail: The Origins of Power, Prosperity and Poverty
- John M. Coates, The Hour Between Dog and Wolf: Risk-taking, Gut Feelings and the Biology of Boom and Bust
- Steve Coll, Private Empire: ExxonMobil and American Power
- Walter Isaacson, Steve Jobs: The Exclusive Biography
- Michael J. Sandel, What Money Can't Buy: The Moral Limits Of Markets
- William L. Silber, Volcker: The Triumph of Persistence

=== 2013 ===
The longlist was announced in August 2013. The shortlist was announced on 18 September 2013. The winner was announced on 18 November 2013.

- Neil Irwin, The Alchemists: Inside the Secret World of Central Bankers
- Iain Martin, Making it Happen: Fred Goodwin, RBS and the Men Who Blew Up the British Economy
- Viktor Mayer-Schönberger and Kenneth Cukier, Big Data: A Revolution That Will Transform How We Live, Work, and Think
- Anita Raghavan, The Billionaire's Apprentice: The Rise of The Indian-American Elite and The Fall of The Galleon Hedge Fund
- Sheryl Sandberg, Lean In: Women, Work, and the Will to Lead
- Brad Stone, The Everything Store: Jeff Bezos and the Age of Amazon

=== 2014 ===
The longlist was announced 6 August 2014. The shortlist was announced 24 September 2014. The winner was announced 11 November 2014.

- Julia Angwin, Dragnet Nation: A Quest for Privacy, Security, and Freedom in a World of Relentless Surveillance
- Erik Brynjolfsson and Andrew McAfee, The Second Machine Age: Work, Progress, and Prosperity in a Time of Brilliant Technologies
- Ed Catmull, Creativity, Inc. Overcoming the Unseen Forces that Stand in the Way of True Inspiration
- Nick Davies, Hack Attack: How the Truth Caught Up with Rupert Murdoch
- Atif Mian and Amir Sufi, House of Debt: How They (and You) Caused the Great Recession, and How We Can Prevent It from Happening Again
- Thomas Piketty, Capital in the Twenty-First Century

=== 2015 ===
The longlist was announced 12 August. The shortlist was announced 22 September. The winner was announced 17 November. The winner received £30,000, and £10,000 was awarded to each of the remaining shortlisted books.

- Martin Ford, The Rise of the Robots: Technology and the Threat of Mass Unemployment
- Jacquie McNish and Sean Silcoff, Losing the Signal: The Untold Story Behind the Extraordinary Rise and Spectacular Fall of Blackberry
- Nathaniel Popper, Digital Gold: The Untold Story of Bitcoin
- Anne-Marie Slaughter, Unfinished Business: Women Men Work Family
- Richard Thaler, Misbehaving: The Making of Behavioural Economics
- Stephen Witt, How Music Got Free: What Happens When an Entire Generation Commits the Same Crime?

=== 2016 ===
The longlist was announced 7 August. The shortlist was announced 9 September. The winner was announced 22 November.

- Iris Bohnet, What Works: Gender Equality by Design
- Duncan Clark, Alibaba: The House That Jack Ma Built
- Rana Foroohar, Makers and Takers: The Rise of Finance and the Fall of American Business
- Robert J. Gordon, The Rise and Fall of American Growth: The U.S. Standard of Living Since the Civil War
- Lynda Gratton and Andrew Scott, The 100-Year Life: Living and Working in an Age of Longevity
- Sebastian Mallaby, The Man Who Knew: The Life and Times of Alan Greenspan

=== 2017 ===
The longlist was announced 13 August. The shortlist was announced on 19 September. The winner was announced 7 November.

- David Enrich, The Spider Network: The Wild Story of a Maths Genius, a Gang of Backstabbing Bankers, and One of the Greatest Scams in Financial History
- Amy Goldstein, Janesville: An American Story
- Andrew W. Lo, Adaptive Markets: Financial Evolution at the Speed of Thought
- Brian Merchant, The One Device: The Secret History of the iPhone
- Ellen Pao, Reset: My Fight for Inclusion and Lasting Change
- Walter Scheidel, The Great Leveler: Violence and the History of Inequality from the Stone Age to the Twenty-First Century

=== 2018 ===
The longlist was announced 13 August. The shortlist was announced on 14 September. The winner was announced 12 November.

- John Carreyrou, Bad Blood: Secrets and Lies in a Silicon Valley Startup
- James Crabtree, The Billionaire Raj: A Journey Through India's New Gilded Age
- Alan Greenspan & Adrian Wooldridge, Capitalism in America: A History
- Annie Lowrey, Give People Money: How a Universal Basic Income Would End Poverty, Revolutionize Work, and Remake the World
- Mariana Mazzucato, The Value of Everything: Who Makes and Who Takes from the Real Economy
- Jeremy Heimans & Henry Timms, New Power: How Power Works in Our Hyperconnected World - and How to Make It Work for You

=== 2019 ===
The longlist was announced 10 August. The shortlist was announced 16 September. The winner was announced 3 December.

- Caroline Criado-Perez, Invisible Women: Exposing Data Bias in a World Designed for Men
- David Epstein, Range: Why Generalists Triumph in a Specialized World
- Christopher Leonard, Kochland: The Secret History of Koch Industries and Corporate Power in America
- Raghuram Rajan, The Third Pillar: The Revival of Community in a Polarised World
- Shoshana Zuboff, The Age of Surveillance Capitalism: The Fight for a Human Future at the New Frontier of Power
- Gregory Zuckerman, The Man Who Solved the Market: How Jim Simons Launched the Quant Revolution

=== 2020 ===
The longlist was announced 16 August. The shortlist was announced 23 September. The winner was announced 1 December.

- Reed Hastings and Erin Meyer, No Rules Rules: Netflix and the Culture of Reinvention
- Daniel Susskind, A World Without Work: Technology, Automation, and How We Should Respond
- Jill Lepore, If Then: How the Simulmatics Corporation Invented the Future
- Rebecca M. Henderson, Reimagining Capitalism in a World on Fire
- Sarah Frier, No Filter: The Inside Story of Instagram
- Anne Case and Angus Deaton, Deaths of Despair and the Future of Capitalism

=== 2021 ===
The longlist was announced 15 August. The shortlist was announced on 24 September. The winner was announced on 1 December.

- Javier Blas and Jack Farchy, The World for Sale: Money, Power and the Traders Who Barter the Earth's Resources
- Patrick Radden Keefe, Empire of Pain: The Secret History of the Sackler Dynasty
- Robert Livingston, The Conversation: How Talking Honestly About Racism Can Transform Individuals and Organizations
- Michael E. Mann, The New Climate War: The Fight to Take Back Our Planet
- Nicole Perlroth, This Is How They Tell Me the World Ends: The Cyberweapons Arms Race
- Adrian Wooldridge, The Aristocracy of Talent: How Meritocracy Made the Modern World

=== 2022 ===
The longlist was announced on 14 August. The shortlist was announced on 22 September. The winner was announced on 5 December.

- Matthew Campbell and Kit Chellel, Dead in the Water: Murder and Fraud in the World's Most Secretive Industry
- Lulu Chen, Influence Empire: The Story of Tencent and China's Tech Ambition
- Gary Gerstle, The Rise and Fall of the Neoliberal Order: America and the World in the Free Market Era
- Sebastian Mallaby, The Power Law: Venture Capital and the Art of Disruption
- Chris Miller, Chip War: The Fight for the World's Most Critical Technology
- Helen Thompson, Disorder: Hard Times in the 21st Century

=== 2023 ===
The longlist was announced on 14 August. The shortlist was announced on 21 September. The winner was announced on 5 December.

- Ed Conway, Material World: A substantial story of our past and future
- Amy Edmondson, Right Kind of Wrong: Why learning to fail can teach us to thrive
- Bent Flyvbjerg and Dan Gardner, How Big Things Get Done: The surprising factors behind every successful project, from home renovations to space exploration and everything in between
- Walter Isaacson, Elon Musk
- Siddharth Kara, Cobalt Red: How the blood of the Congo powers our lives
- Mustafa Suleyman and Michael Bhaskar, The Coming Wave: AI, power, and the 21st century's greatest dilemma

=== 2024 ===
The longlist was announced on 18 August. The shortlist was announced on 17 September. The winner was announced on 9 December.

- John Kay, The Corporation in the Twenty-First Century: Why (almost) everything we are told about business is wrong
- Michael Morris, Tribal: How the Cultural Instincts That Divide Us Can Help Bring Us Together
- Parmy Olson, Supremacy: AI, ChatGPT and the Race That Will Change the World
- Andrew Scott, The Longevity Imperative: Building a Better Society for Healthier, Longer Lives
- Raj Shah and Christopher Kirchhoff, Unit X: How the Pentagon and Silicon Valley Are Transforming the Future of War
- Daniel Susskind, Growth: A Reckoning

=== 2025 ===
The longlist was announced on 17 August. The shortlist was announced on 24 September. The winner was announced on 4 December.

- Eva Dou, House of Huawei: Inside the Secret World of China’s Most Powerful Company
- Edward Fishman, Chokepoints: How the Global Economy Became a Weapon of War
- Carl Benedikt Frey, How Progress Ends: Technology, Innovation, and the Fate of Nations
- Ezra Klein and Derek Thompson, Abundance: How We Build a Better Future
- Dan Wang, Breakneck: China's Quest to Engineer the Future
- Stephen Witt, The Thinking Machine: Jensen Huang, Nvidia and the World's Most Coveted Microchip

== See also ==
- McKinsey Award for Best Article of the Year in The Harvard Business Review
