= New Power (book) =

2018 non-fiction book

- Author: Jeremy Heimans; Henry Timms
- Language: English
- Publisher: Doubleday
- Publication date: April 3, 2018
- Pages: 336
- ISBN: 0385541112

New Power is a 2018 book by Jeremy Heimans and Henry Timms. It has been described by Financial Times as "an analysis of how self-organising, bottom-up movements develop" and expands on ideas previously introduced by Heimans and Timms in Harvard Business Review.

The Philanthropist described New Power as "a timely and optimistic book about the possibilities for social and economic transformation offered through digital technologies". David Brooks wrote a feature about New Power in The New York Times, where he described the book as "the best window I've seen into this new world". The Guardian has described New Power as "a manual on how to navigate the 21st century". Stanford Social Innovation Review described New Power as the "road map to a new world". It was shortlisted for the Financial Times Business Book of the Year Award.
