= SATC =

SATC may refer to:

- Inmarsat-C, a satellite communications system sometimes called SATC or SAT-C
- Sabena Airline Training Center, airline transport pilot school located in Mesa, Arizona, U.S.
- Salina Area Technical College, a technical college in Salina, Kansas, U.S
- Sex and the City (book), by Candace Bushnell
  - Sex and the City, a TV series that was shown on HBO from 1998 until 2004, based on the book
  - Sex and the City (film), based on the TV show
    - Sex and the City: Original Motion Picture Soundtrack, soundtrack to the film
- Software Assurance Technology Center
- South Atlantic tropical cyclone
- South Australian Tourism Commission
- State Theatre Company of South Australia, formerly South Australian Theatre Company or SATC
- Student Army Training Corps, America military program for college-enrolled men during World War I
