= Wilful Blindness =

Wilful Blindness may refer to:

- Willful blindness or Willful ignorance
- Wilful Blindness (2011 book), a non-fiction book by Margaret Heffernan
- Wilful Blindness (2021 book), an investigative book by Sam Cooper
