= NYK =

NYK may stand for:

- New York Knicks, a National Basketball Association team based in New York City.
- Nippon Yusen Kaisha, a shipping company
  - NYKU8210506, an NYK-owned shipping container being tracked by the BBC
- Nanyuki Airport, Kenya (IATA code: NYK)
- North Yorkshire, county in England, Chapman code
