= Carl Benedikt Frey =

Swedish-German economist and economic historian

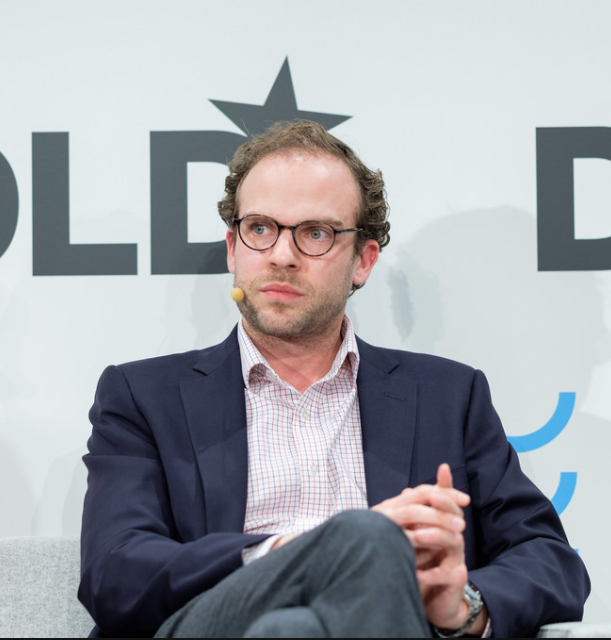
- Frey in 2016
- Born: Stockholm, Sweden
- Education: Lund University; Max Planck Institute for Innovation and Competition (PhD)
- Occupations: Economist, economic historian

Carl Benedikt Frey is a Swedish-German economist and economic historian. He is the Dieter Schwarz Professor of Political Economy and Technology at the Oxford Internet Institute and a Fellow of Mansfield College, University of Oxford. He is widely known for his 2013 paper with Maike Osborne, "The Future of Employment," which estimated that 47% of US jobs were at high risk of automation, becoming one of the first and most cited works on AI's impact on labor markets.

Frey is also the author of The Technology Trap (2019) and How Progress Ends (2025), which was a finalist for the Lionel Gelber Prize and the Financial Times Business Book of the Year Award.

He has written for newspapers and magazines such as the Financial Times, The Economist (By Invitation), The New York Times, The Wall Street Journal, Foreign Affairs, Wired, Times Literary Supplement, and Scientific American.

== Career ==
Frey was born in Stockholm, Sweden. After attending Katedralskolan, he studied economics, history and management at Lund University. Developing a strong interest in economic history and technological change, Frey completed his PhD at the Max Planck Institute for Innovation and Competition in Munich. He subsequently joined the Oxford Martin School where he founded the programme on the Future of Work. Between 2012 and 2014, he was teaching at the Department of Economic History at Lund University.

In 2012, Frey became an economics associate of Nuffield College and Senior Fellow at the Institute for New Economic Thinking, both University of Oxford. He remains a visiting fellow of the Department of Economic History at Lund University. In May 2023, he was appointed the Dieter Schwarz Associate Professor of Artificial Intelligence and Work at the Oxford Internet Institute and became a Fellow of Mansfield College, Oxford.

== Research and publications ==
Frey studies how technological change reshapes labour markets, cities, and long-run economic growth — and why societies sometimes embrace new technologies and sometimes resist them. The economics bibliographic database IDEAS/RePEc ranks him among the top 5% of economists under a number of criteria.

=== AI and the future of work ===
In 2013, Frey, together with Oxford professor Michael Osborne, co-authored "The Future of Employment: How Susceptible Are Jobs to Computerization". With over 20,000 citations according to Google Scholar, the study's methodology has been used by President Barack Obama's Council of Economic Advisors, the Bank of England, the World Bank, as well as a popular risk-prediction tool by the BBC.

The study entered popular culture and policy debate alike, featuring on HBO's Last Week Tonight with John Oliver in 2019.

Although the Frey and Osborne study has often been taken to imply an employment apocalypse, Frey made clear that their study should not be taken to mean the end of work. In a retrospective (published in 2019) on the ensuing debate, The Economist referred to him as "an accidental doom-monger" and pointed out that Frey is in fact much more optimistic than he had been made out to be. Reflecting on their 2013 paper in the light of the wave of Generative AI, Frey and Osborne revisited their earlier assessments in an article titled "Generative AI and the Future of Work: A Reappraisal." They concluded that while generative AI has expanded the scope for automation, its primary effect is democratizing expertise, enabling more people to perform knowledge work with less training.

=== AI and language skills ===
Frey has studied the labour market effects of machine translation, finding that the spread of Google Translate slowed employment growth for translators and reduced demand for foreign-language skills across a range of occupations and industries. The authors argue that the findings have implications for trade in services and for the role of language barriers in globalisation.

=== Remote collaboration and innovation ===
With colleagues at Oxford and the University of Pittsburgh, Frey has studied whether the rise of remote teamwork has helped or hindered scientific breakthroughs. Their analysis of more than 20 million research papers and four million patents shows that while scientists around the world collaborate across far greater distances than they used to, remote teams are consistently less likely to produce breakthrough discoveries than those working in the same location. This is because remote collaborators tend to handle technical execution, while idea generation benefits from the kind of informal, face-to-face interaction that digital tools cannot fully replace.

However, in a companion study, Frey and Presidente found that this remote penalty tapered off and even reversed from the 2010s onward, as improvements in collaboration technology made it easier for distributed team members to tap into each other's local knowledge networks — with larger effects among established teams whose members had moved to stronger institutions, bringing access to new pools of ideas and expertise.

=== The Computer Revolution and the geography of new jobs ===
Together with Berger, Frey has traced how the computer revolution of the 1980s reshaped which American cities thrived and which fell behind. Before 1980, new jobs tended to require routine skills, but after the arrival of personal computers, new roles increasingly demanded analytical and problem-solving abilities. Because these jobs clustered in cities that already had highly skilled workforces, the computer revolution helped widen the economic gap between prosperous knowledge hubs and declining industrial towns.

=== The gig economy: Uber, wages, and wellbeing ===
Frey and co-authors have investigated what happened to traditional taxi drivers when Uber arrived in their city, finding that incumbent drivers saw their earnings fall by roughly 10 percent, even though they did not lose their jobs outright. In a companion study of Uber's own drivers in London, he and his colleagues found that, despite earning relatively low wages, they reported higher life satisfaction than comparable workers — suggesting they valued the flexibility to set their own hours — though they also reported substantially higher levels of anxiety.

=== Privacy regulation and firm performance: the GDPR ===
Frey and collaborators have examined the economic consequences of Europe's data privacy law, the General Data Protection Regulation (GDPR). They found that the regulation reduced the profits of technology companies by about 2.1 percent — not because consumers bought less, but because firms had to spend heavily on compliance. The costs fell hardest on smaller companies, which had fewer resources to adapt, while large technology firms were relatively unscathed. The authors argue that the regulation may have made it harder for smaller players to compete.

=== Automation and political populism ===
With co-authors, Frey has examined the political consequences of automation, finding that support for Donald Trump in the 2016 US presidential election was significantly higher in local labour markets more exposed to robots — even after controlling for other explanations such as trade and offshoring. The authors’ counterfactual exercise suggested that, absent faster robot adoption, Michigan, Pennsylvania, and Wisconsin would have voted for Hillary Clinton.

== Books ==
=== The Technology Trap ===
In 2019, Frey published The Technology Trap: Capital, Labor, and Power in the Age of Automation (Princeton University Press). The book compares the British Industrial Revolution with the computer revolution, arguing that technological change can raise overall prosperity while producing concentrated gains and worker displacement. Frey goes on to argue that the reason why the Industrial Revolution first happened in Britain was that governments there were the first to side with inventors and industrialists, and vigorously repressed any worker resistance to mechanisation. In continental Europe (and in China), in contrast, worker resistance was successful, which Frey suggests helps explain why economic growth there was slow to take off. Luddite efforts to avoid the short-term disruption associated with a new technology, can end up denying access to its long-term benefits—something Frey calls a "technology trap". Writing in The New York Times, Talking Heads singer David Byrne called it "the last great book I've read".

=== How Progress Ends ===
In 2025, Frey published How Progress Ends: Technology, Innovation, and the Fate of Nations (Princeton University Press).The book argues that technological and economic progress is not inevitable, noting that for most of human history stagnation was the norm and that leading technological powers — from Song China to the Dutch Republic to Victorian Britain — eventually lost their innovative edge. Drawing on a thousand years of case studies, Frey identifies a recurring tension: decentralised systems foster the exploration of new technologies, while bureaucratic coordination is needed to scale them. When institutions fail to adapt, stagnation follows. He applies this framework to the United States and China, arguing that both face versions of this challenge today. Reviewing the book in Foreign Affairs, Barry Eichengreen described it as a sweeping survey of a millennium of economic growth with an eye toward charting possible technological futures. Writing in the Wall Street Journal, Marc Levinson noted that both free marketeers and central planners may find their views challenged by the book's conclusions.

=== Book reviews ===
- Review of How Progress Ends by Philip Zelikow in Times Literary Supplement
- Review of How Progress Ends by Barry Eichengreen in Foreign Affairs
- Review of How Progress Ends by Tej Parikh in the Financial Times
- Review of How Progress Ends by Marc Levinson in The Wall Street Journal
- Review of How Progress Ends by Martin Wolf in the Financial Times
- Review of The Technology Trap by Joel Mokyr in The Journal of Economic History
- Review of The Technology Trap by Alexander J. Field in EH.net (Economic History Association)
- Review of The Technology Trap by John Thornhill in the Financial Times

== Honours ==
The Technology Trap won Princeton University's Richard A. Lester Prize for the outstanding book in industrial relations and labor economics and was selected as a Financial Times Best Book of 2019 by John Thornhill.

How Progress Ends was a finalist for both the Financial Times Business Book of the Year Award and the Lionel Gelber Prize, won the 2026 PROSE Award in Social Sciences: Economics, and was selected as a Financial Times Best Book of 2025 by Martin Wolf.

== Journalism (selected) ==
- Frey, C. B. (2026). Closing Europe’s Dynamism Deficit. Project Syndicate
- Frey, C. B. (2026). ‘Can a machine do this job?’ is the wrong question. Financial Times.
- Frey, C. B. (2026). This Is Why You’re Drowning in Busywork. The New York Times.
- Frey, C. B. (2025, December 5). Don't fear the AI bubble bursting. The New York Times.
- Frey, C. B. (2025). How America outcompeted Japan. Foreign Affairs.
- Frey, C. B. (2025, September). How the battle for control could crush AI's promise. IMF Finance & Development.
- Frey, C. B. (2025, May 27). Want to destroy American business? Protect it. The Economist.
- Frey, C. B. (2025). AI alone cannot solve the productivity puzzle. Financial Times.

== Videos ==
- Why AI Isn't Actually Boosting Productivity, Trumponomics, Bloomberg Podcasts, 2026
- World Economic Forum 2026, Davos
- Chatham House, 2026 in London
- Will AGI be Humanity's Last Great Invention?, Oxford Union Debate 2026.
- CNN, Quest Means Business, 2025
- World Economic Forum, 16th Annual Meeting of the New Champions 2025 in Tianjin
