= James Kynge =

British financial journalist

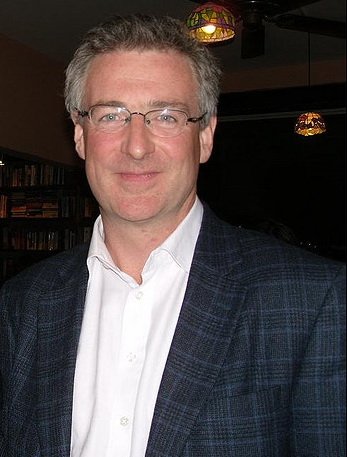
James Kynge

James Kynge is the principal of China Confidential and Renminbi Compass, proprietary research services from the Financial Times.

== Career ==
Kynge spent over two decades as a journalist in Asia, initially for Reuters and then as China Bureau Chief for the Financial Times between 1998 and 2005.

Kynge speaks fluent Mandarin, and is a regular commentator on Chinese and Asian issues for media outlets including NPR, CNN and the BBC.

His first book China Shakes The World: A Titan's Rise and Troubled Future - and the Challenge for America describes the development of China as a superpower; it has been translated into 19 languages.

== Personal life ==
Kynge lives in Beijing, is married and has three children.

== Awards and honors ==
In 2016, he won the 2016 Wincott Foundation award for Financial Journalist of the Year. China Shakes The World won the 2006 Financial Times and Goldman Sachs Business Book of the Year Award.
