= Chip War =

2022 nonfiction book by Chris Miller

Chip War: The Fight for the World’s Most Critical Technology
- Author: Chris Miller
- Language: English
- Genre: Nonfiction
- Publisher: Scribner
- Publication date: October 2022
- Publication place: United States
- Pages: 464
- ISBN: 978-1-9821-7200-8

Chip War: The Fight for the World's Most Critical Technology is a 2022 nonfiction book by Chris Miller, an economic historian and nonresident senior fellow at the conservative think tank American Enterprise Institute, as well as professor at Tufts University's Fletcher School of Law and Diplomacy. It chronicles the transformation of the semiconductor into an essential component of contemporary life. Miller describes in detail some of the geopolitical battles. Chip War outlines the structure and history of the semiconductor sector, providing helpful background for readers without prior knowledge. The book was widely well received and praised by numerous notable reviewers. In addition to it being a New York Times Best Seller, the book received the 2022 Financial Times Business Book of the Year award, the Council on Foreign Relations Arthur Ross Book Award, and the Institute of Electrical and Electronics Engineers 2024 History Prize.

== Author ==
Chris Miller is a professor at the Fletcher School at Tufts University, an economic historian, and a senior fellow at the American Enterprise Institute, a think-tank in Washington, D.C. He holds a BA in history from Harvard and went on to receive his MA and PhD in history from Yale University. His academic background and his teaching at the New Economic School in Moscow gave him expertise in strategic and defense issues, particularly in the semiconductor industry.

Miller became interested in computing and chips while studying the Cold War, when the U.S. and Soviet Union invested heavily in advanced, self-guiding weapons. He realized that this arms race was driven by competition in computing and developing increasingly powerful chips. His research showed that as of 2022, companies and governments continue to be involved in this race to develop and build the most advanced chips for strategic purposes. The relevance of this situation in the current geopolitical landscape is what inspired Miller to write Chip War.

== Historical context ==
Semiconductors emerged after Bell Labs invented the transistor in 1947 and later developed the first integrated circuits by placing multiple transistors on a single silicon chip. A fast-growing industry formed in California, which soon outsourced labor-intensive tasks to Asia. Over the next few decades, new innovations accelerated chip performance and drove the growth of the industry. Global competition, especially from the Soviet Union and Japan, attempted to rival that of the US, but they weren't able to compete with Silicon Valley.

As of the early 2000s, China has become the most significant challenge to US dominance, investing heavily to reduce its dependence on foreign chips, especially Taiwan's. Taiwan accounts for the vast majority of the world's advanced logic chips, largely due to the rise of Taiwan Semiconductor Manufacturing Company (TSMC). As of 2022, TSMC is the world's largest and most advanced semiconductor manufacturer.

== Overview ==
Chip War claims that today's economy depends heavily on semiconductor chips. Miller begins the book by outlining the early development of semiconductors, showing how Cold War competition shaped the industry's origins. He also highlights the important engineers and national strategies that drove early innovation. Miller then examines how the different political, economic, and technological strategies of countries such as Europe, Japan, China, and Taiwan shaped the modern chip industry. The book concludes by analyzing the highly concentrated nature of the modern chip supply chain, and the geopolitical tensions, especially between China and the United States, surrounding advanced manufacturing.

Miller explains that the quest for control in this industry is predicted to significantly influence future times. The book also emphasizes China's vulnerability due to its reliance on imported chips, noting that China's expenditure on chip importation exceeds its oil purchases.

== Critical reception ==
The book has received a significant amount of positive critical reception. Financial Times journalist Demetri Sevastopulo commended the book for making a complex industry comprehensible. Both Sevastopulo and Global Policy praise the level of detail that the book provides regarding the politics and history of microchips. Sevastopulo appreciated Miller's detailed depiction of the chip industry's fluctuations, not just in the US, but also in Asian countries that control large portions of the supply chain for this technology. Global Policy evaluated Chip War as potentially the most comprehensive book on the microchip industry's geopolitics so far. The review acknowledged Miller's wide-ranging coverage, from the industry's modest origins in Silicon Valley to its current state of "weaponized interdependence", concentrated primarily near the Taiwan Strait. Kirkus Reviews describes the book as an important warning, highlighting Miller's argument that the United States is losing its technological lead. Greg Mankiw has also highly recommended the book, emphasizing its importance for both economics and politics.

However, there are also some reviews that point out the book's shortcomings. Although Barry Eichengreen, writing for Foreign Affairs, notes that Miller displays a smooth storytelling style, but highlights that he completed the book before the implementation of recent US policies that aim to restrict China's access to advanced chip-making technology. Eichengreen also pointed out that the book draws no conclusions on the potential effectiveness of US export controls in curbing the growth of China's semiconductor industry, or whether these measures might provoke China into intensifying its support for the industry or take forceful action against Taiwan.

== Awards and recognition ==
Name	Organization	Year	Reference
Business Book of the Year	Financial Times	2022	
Best Books of the Year	The Economist	2022	
Best Books of the Year	Foreign Affairs	2022	
The New York Times bestseller	The New York Times	2022	
PROSE Award	Association of American Publishers	2023	
Arthur Ross Book Award	Council on Foreign Relations	2023	
No. 1 on CEO Survey of the best books	Fortune Global 500	2023	
Middleton History Award	Institute of Electrical and Electronics Engineers (IEEE)	2024	

== Film adaptation ==
In November 2026, it was announced that Darren Aronofsky would produce a documentary film adaptation of the book. The film will be directed by Theo Anthony.

== See also ==
- ASML
- SK Hynix
- Semiconductor device fabrication
