= James Crabtree =

British journalist, author, economist academic

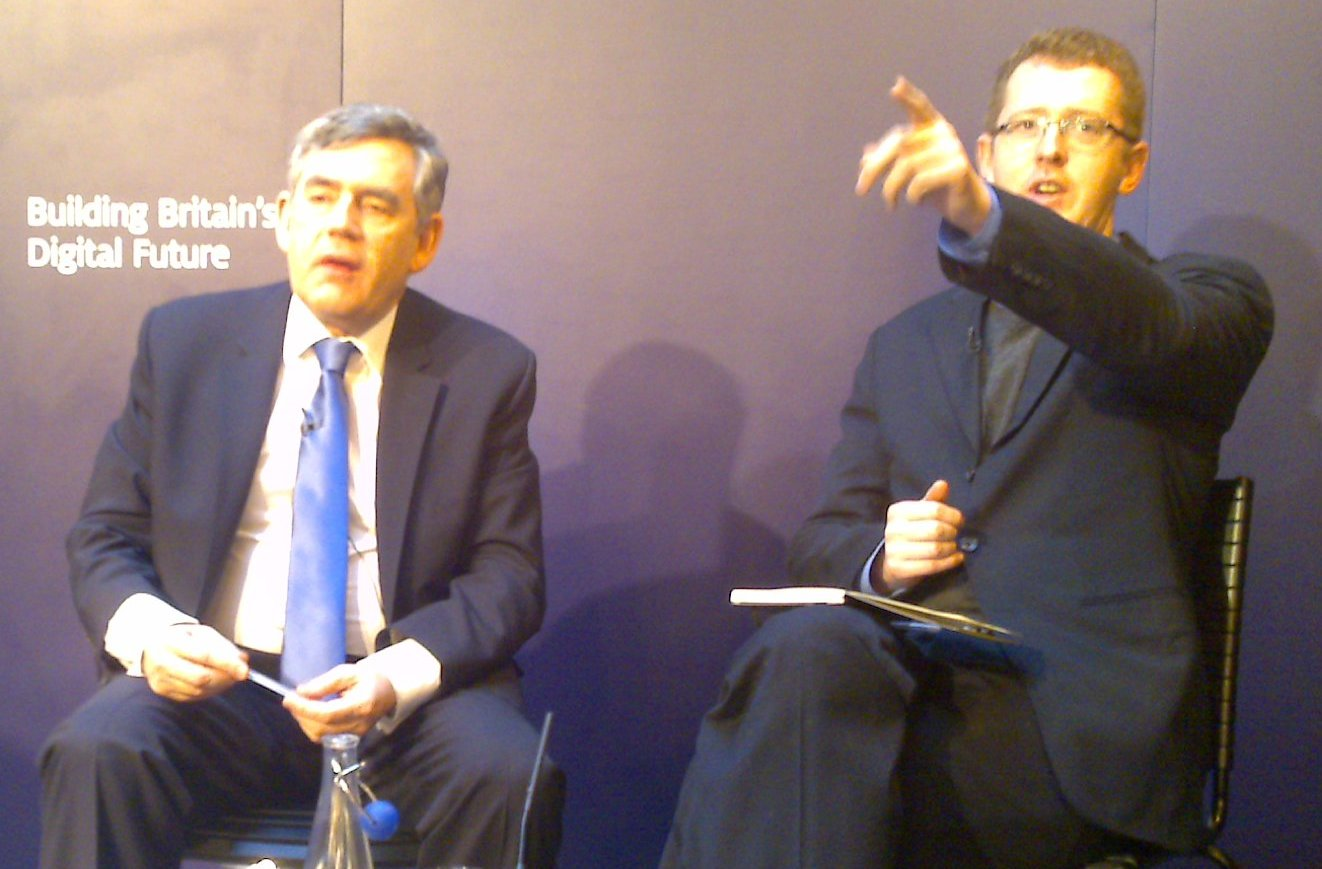
- Crabtree with Gordon Brown
- Born: Scotland
- Education: John F. Kennedy School of Government; Harvard University; London School of Economics
- Occupations: Author, policy analyst, journalist
- Website: jamescrabtree.com

James Crabtree is a British author and geopolitical analyst. His first book, The Billionaire Raj: A Journey Through India’s New Gilded Age, was released in July 2018. As of October 2024 he is a distinguished visiting fellow at the European Council on Foreign Relations. He has written columns for Nikkei Asian Review and and Foreign Policy.

Previously, he was the Singapore-based executive director of the Asia branch of the International Institute for Strategic Studies, and an associate professor of practice at the Lee Kuan Yew School of Public Policy at the National University of Singapore and a senior fellow at the school’s Centre on Asia and Globalisation. He was also a non-resident fellow at Chatham House, the London-based think tank.

== Biography ==
Crabtree was born in Scotland. He studied government at the London School of Economics between 1995 and 1998, and public policy at Harvard's John F. Kennedy School of Government between 2004 and 2006.

Crabtree began his career working in think tanks in the UK, including The Work Foundation and the Institute for Public Policy Research.

In 2007, Crabtree joined the UK Prime Minister's Strategy Unit, working initially as part of the team that produced the Power of Information Review, led by Ed Mayo and Tom Steinberg, in June that year.

In 2009 to 2010, Crabtree worked as a senior editor at Prospect, a British magazine. From 2010, Crabtree worked for the Financial Times, first on the newspaper’s opinion page in London and then as Mumbai bureau chief between 2011 and 2016. Crabtree has written for a range of other publications, including The Guardian, Foreign Policy, The New York Times, The Straits Times and Wired.

In July 2018, Crabtree's book The Billionaire Raj: A Journey Through India's New Gilded Age was published by Penguin Random House in the United States, Oneworld in the United Kingdom and HarperCollins in India. In September 2018, the book was shortlisted for the Financial Times and McKinsey Business Book of the Year Award. In November 2018, The Billionaire Raj was named Business Book of the Year at the Tata LitLive! Awards in Mumbai.
