= Margaret Heffernan =

American entrepreneur, CEO, writer and keynote speaker

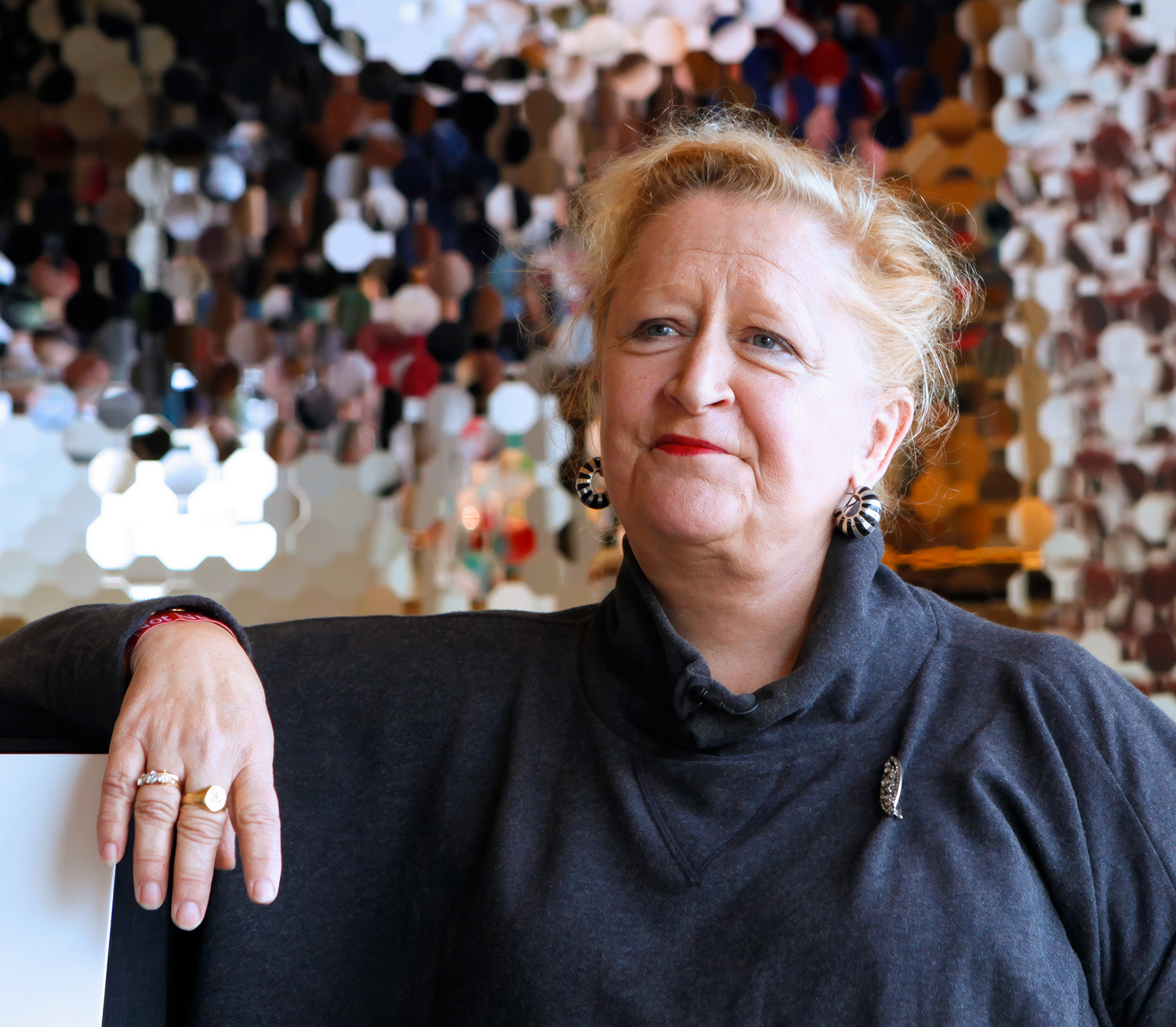
- Heffernan in September 2016
- Born: 1955 (age 70–71); Texas, USA
- Education: Cambridge University
- Occupation: Businesswoman

Margaret Heffernan (born 16 June 1955) is an entrepreneur, CEO, writer and keynote speaker. She is a professor of practice at the University of Bath School of Management in the UK and, in 2021, was inaugurated into the Thinkers50 Hall of Fame for her lasting contribution to Management Thinking.

Heffernan is the former chief executive officer of five businesses and the writer of seven books that explore the areas of business, leadership, decision making and creativity. She teaches entrepreneurship, mentors executives as part of a leadership development company, and makes presentations for corporations, associations, and universities.

While Heffernan's first two books focused on female leadership and entrepreneurship and how they impact women in the workplace, her overarching theme is recognizing and releasing the capacity that often lies buried inside organizations, under-valued and under-rewarded because it is unconventional.

== Early life ==
Heffernan was born in Texas, US. At some point, her family moved to the Netherlands where she spent the majority of her childhood. They later moved to the United Kingdom. She attended Cambridge University and received a Master of Arts degree.

== Personal life ==
Heffernan was awarded an Honorary Degree from the University of Bath in 2011, where she is a regular lecturer in the university's MBA program.

Currently, Heffernan lives in Somerset.

== Career ==
In the UK, she produced drama and feature programmes for BBC Radio. For 8 years as a television producer, she made documentary films for Timewatch, Arena, and Newsnight. She designed and executive-produced a thirteen-part series on the French Revolution for the BBC and A&E (TV network) featuring Alan Rickman, Simon Callow, Alfred Molina and Simon Schama. She also produced music videos with the London Chamber Orchestra to raise money for UNICEF's Lebanese fund.

She subsequently became managing director of IPPA. Moving to the United States in 1994, she developed software programmes for The Learning Company and S&P Global Ratings, and then bought, sold and ran businesses for CMGI, as Chief Executive of iCast Corporation, ZineZone Corporation and Information Corporation.

== TED ==
In June 2012, Heffernan spoke at TedGlobal. Her talk "Dare to Disagree," drawn from her book "Wilful Blindness: Why We Ignore the Obvious at our Peril", illustrated some of the driving forces behind personal and institutional failure. The book was shortlisted for the Financial Times Business Book of the Year Award and was subsequently described as one of the most important books of the decade.

In March 2013, she gave a talk at TEDxDanudia, concentrating on the dangers of willful blindness.

In May 2015, Heffernan gave a talk at TEDWomen 2015, titled "Why it's time to forget the Pecking Order at Work". This drew from her book "A Bigger Prize: Why No One Wins Unless Everyone Wins" which won the Transmission Prize. Her talk highlighted how social capital makes candor safe, encouraging more frequent conflicts and leading to better outcomes.

In July 2019, she gave her fourth talk for TED at TEDSummit 2019 about the need for more human skills and less technology to solve problems in business, government and life in the modern age. This book was based on her book "Uncharted: How To Navigate The Future" which was published immediately before the COVID-19 pandemic in 2020.

== Books ==
Heffernan writes from her experience, saying she started writing about business because "nothing captured the reality of running companies."

=== The Naked Truth ===
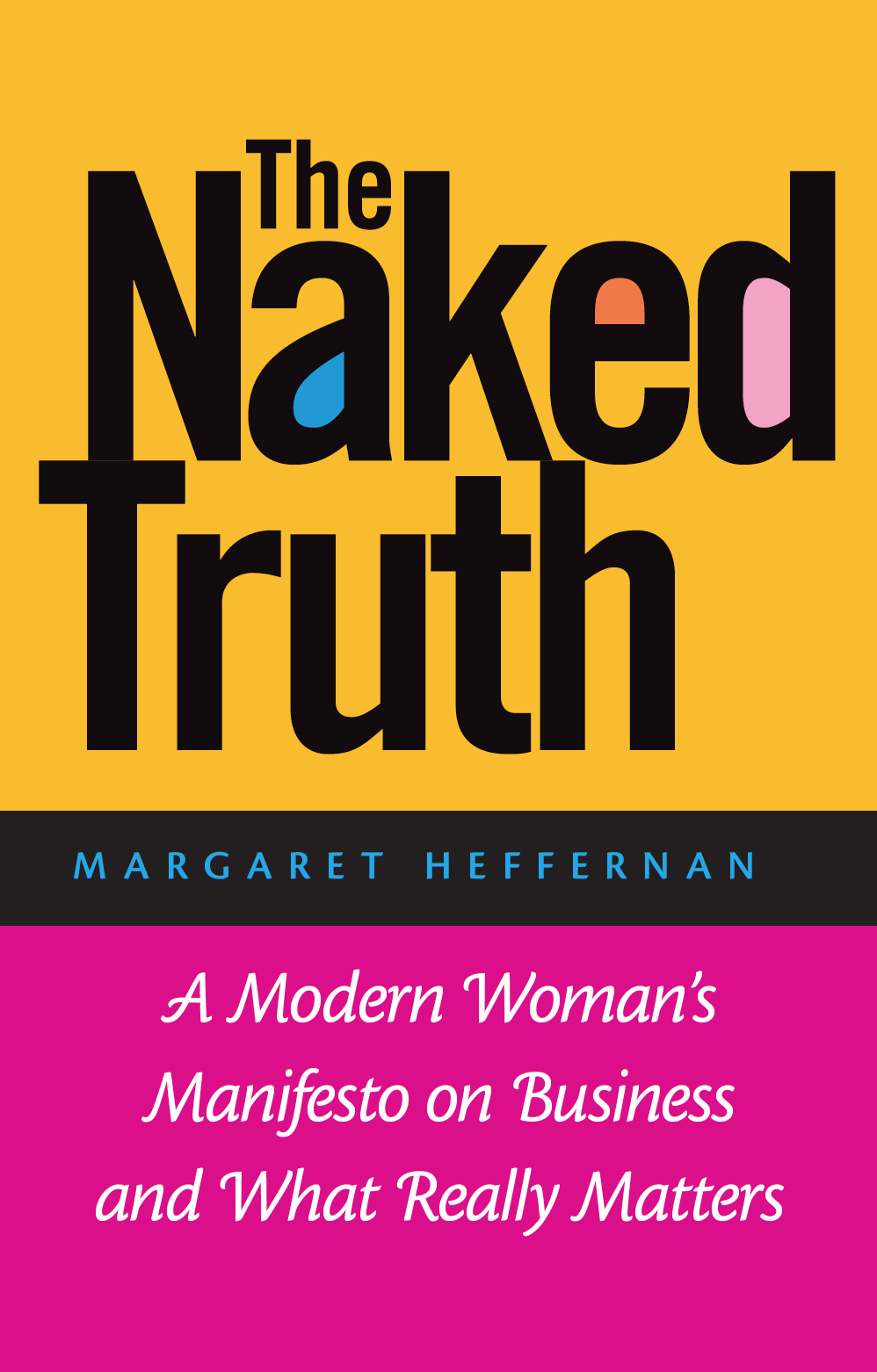
UK Front Cover for The Naked Truth

The Naked Truth: A Working Woman’s Manifesto about Business and What Really Matters was published in 2004. The book looked at the barriers to women's equality in the workplace and collected experiences and advice from successful business women who had overcome them. In particular, the book examined women's attitudes about power and how they define and use power differently from men. The book argued that men see power as expressed through personal or organizational dominance, while women see power as derived from orchestration. Men express ambition as getting to the top, while women see ambition as the ability to live and work freely. The book concludes by arguing that what women bring to the workplace is distinctive and highly suited to the non-linear complexities of modern business.

=== Women On Top ===
How She Does It (republished in paperback as Women On Top) was published after The Naked Truth. The book examines women who substituted the struggle to succeed within traditional, male-dominated organizations for running their own companies. The book examines the statistics underlying the growth and outsize success of female-owned businesses, posing the question: "How is it that women achieve so much more when they get so much less in the way of institutional support and funding?" Examining women's motivation, their neurological and social advantages, choice of markets, leadership styles, use of networks and advisors and their different approaches to mergers, acquisitions and exits. The book argues women's different motivations, thinking and leading styles position them for entrepreneurial success. But much of what makes them succeed are approaches and strategies that men could also emulate. The book concludes to say women set a particularly high standard for business success that might provide a powerful antidote to some of the failed business cultures of the past.

=== Wilful Blindness ===
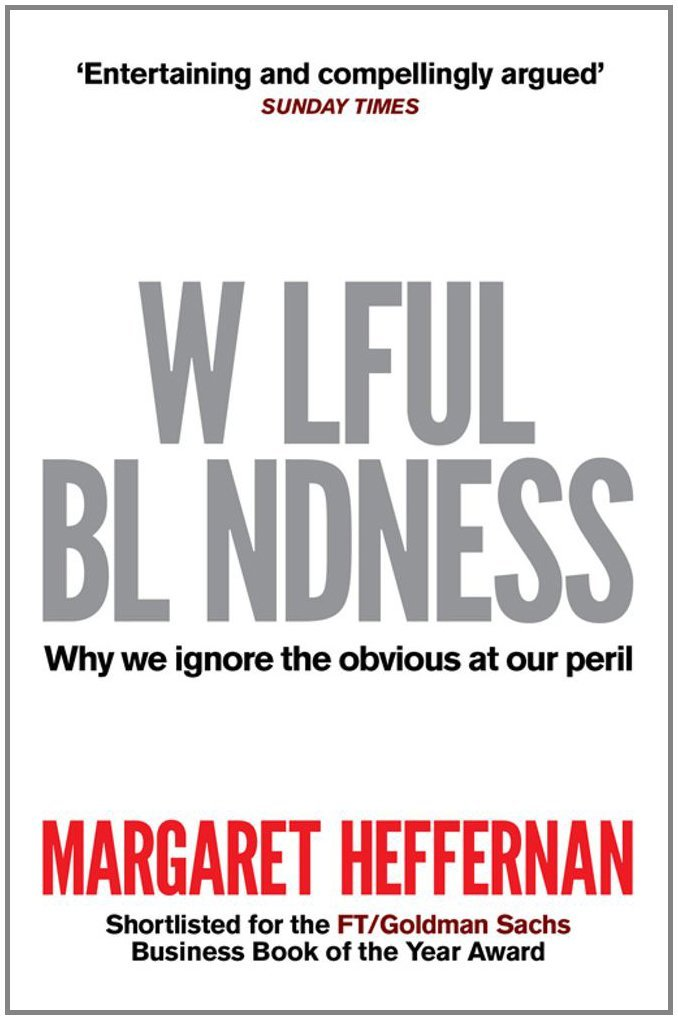
UK Front Cover for Wilful Blindness

Wilful Blindness: Why We Ignore the Obvious at our Peril was published in 2011. In it, Heffernan argues that the biggest threats and dangers we face are the ones we don't see – not because they're secret or invisible, but because we’re willfully blind. She examines the phenomenon and traces its imprint in our private and working lives and within governments and organizations. She asks: "What makes us prefer ignorance? What are we so afraid of? Why do some people see more than others? And how can we change?"

Heffernan cites examples of willful blindness in the Catholic Church, the United States Securities and Exchange Commission, Nazi Germany, Bernard Madoff’s investors, BP’s safety record, the military in Afghanistan and the dog-eat-dog world of subprime mortgage lenders. In its wide use of psychological research and examples from history, the book has been compared to work by Malcolm Gladwell and Nassim Nicholas Taleb.

=== A Bigger Prize ===
Her book, A Bigger Prize: Why Competition isn't Everything and How We Do Better, published in the United Kingdom on February 27, 2014, looks at the perils of competition and how this over emphasis on competing is damaging our society in everything from big business all the way down to everyday family life.

=== Beyond Measure ===
In Beyond Measure, Margaret Heffernan looks back over her decades spent overseeing different organizations and comes to a counterintuitive conclusion: it's the small shifts that have the greatest impact.

=== Uncharted: How to Navigate the Future ===
In this book, Heffernan examined the flaws in forecasting that show the world to be inherently complex and therefore unpredictable. How is one to deal with life and business, knowing that there is so much we don’t know, is her theme.

=== Embracing Uncertainty ===
This book examines the degree to which artists are so frequently ahead of their times and asks what can be learned from the way that they live and work.

== Broadcasting ==
Heffernan is a frequent broadcaster for the BBC, where she has presented many programmes in the Analysis series, and on the TED House. She also appeared in Hard Talk and The Spark talking about "Uncharted: How To Navigate The Future".

== Awards ==
Heffernan was named one of the Internet’s Top 100 by Silicon Alley Reporter in 1999, one of the Top 25 by Streaming Media magazine and one of the Top 100 Media Executives by The Hollywood Reporter.

In 2001, her "Tear Down the Wall" campaign against AOL won the Silver SABRE award for public relations. In 2008, her documentary for BBC Radio 4 on the rise of female entrepreneurship, Changing the Rules, won the Prowess Media Award.

Her two radio plays, Enron and Power Play, were broadcast on Radio 4 and nominated for a Sony award.

In 2011, Wilful Blindness was a finalist for the Financial Times' Best Business Book award.

In 2015, A Bigger Prize won the Transmission Prize.

== Publications ==
Margaret Heffernan talks about Willful Blindness on Bookbits radio.

- Embracing Uncertainty. Policy Press, 2025. ISBN 978-1447372677
- Uncharted. Simon & Schuster, 2020. ISBN 978-1982112622
- More Than A Dream: Feminist Utopias. Etsy, 2016. ISBN 978-1526202420
- Beyond Measure. Simon & Schuster, 2015. ISBN 978-1471141874
- A Bigger Prize. Simon & Schuster, 2014. ISBN 978-1471100758
- Willful Blindness. Walker & Company, 2011. ISBN 978-0-8027-1998-0
- Women on Top. Penguin, 2008. ISBN 0-14-311280-5
- How She Does It. Viking Adult, 2007. ISBN 0-670-03823-7
- The Naked Truth. Jossey-Bass, 2004. ISBN 978-0-7879-7143-4

=== Articles ===
Heffernan's articles on business leadership, entrepreneurship and innovation have appeared in Fast Company, Huffington Post, CBS MoneyWatch, London Business School’s Strategy Review, Inc.com and on The Financial Times.

- How to Be Productive: Stop Working (BNet)
- How to Write Job Descriptions that Actually Mean Something (BNet)
- Is It Okay for Women to Breastfeed at Work? (BNet)
- Dog Eat Dog (Fast Company)
- In Good Company (More Magazine)
- Recreating Milgram: the French ‘game of death’ (Huffington Post)
