= The Billionaire Raj =

2018 non-fiction book by James Crabtree

The Billionaire Raj: A Journey Through India's New Gilded Age
- Editors: James Crabtree
- Language: English
- Genre: Nonfiction
- Published: July 2018
- Publisher: Tim Duggan Books
- Publication place: United States
- Media type: Paperback
- Pages: 416
- ISBN: 978-1-524-760069

The Billionaire Raj: A Journey Through India's New Gilded Age is a 2018 non-fiction book written by British author James Crabtree. The book is about wealth inequality in India, exploring Indian billionaires, the caste, and economic reform advocates. Crabtree is a journalist for Financial Times.

== Reception ==
In the Literary Review, Oliver Balch calls the book "thoroughly entertaining" and writes that the economic content "neither bores nor overbears", but criticises the "familiarity of some of its examples".

A Publishers Weekly review lauds the book as "an invaluable commentary on Indian democracy", and praises Crabtree for "[bringing] a reporter's precision and flair to his story". A Kirkus Reviews critic summarises the book as "[s]olid reading for students of economic development and global economics". Tunku Varadarajan of Wall Street Journal compliments the book for being "a lively and valuable blend of the empirical and the anecdotal". Melissa van der Klugt of The Times calls the book "timely reading" and says Crabtree has an "eye for detail", but notes that it is an "oddly macho book" due to only rare mentions of women.

Writing in the Financial Times, Meghnad Desai describes the book as “the most comprehensive and eminently readable tour of economic India.”

Jonathan Knee of The New York Times laments that the book "does not fully profile the diverse community of Indian billionaires" and that "the lines between the many forms of corruption described are far from clear", though Knee praises that The Billionaire Raj "is chock-full of profoundly revealing vignettes".

Writing for Mint, V. Anantha Nageswaran notes the absence of the United Progressive Alliance in the book and praises Crabtree's writing and "eye of a good journalist for details". comments on the absence of IT entrepreneurs, but believes there is "no comparable account of India's gilded age", complimenting the book as "a reporting gem" which "deserves to be widely read". Una Galani of Reuters notes that the book is not optimistic but says that Crabtree "deserves credit for delving deep into cronyism".

The book has also been reviewed in Business Standard, Financial Times and The Economist. Crabtree has been interviewed on the book by multiple media outlets including Mint, The Times of India, The Wire, The Indian Express and The Financial Express.

== Awards ==
In November 2018, The Billionaire Raj was named Business Book of the Year at the Tata LitLive! Awards in Mumbai.

=== Nominations ===
- The book was shortlisted for the 2018 Financial Times and McKinsey Business Book of the Year Award.
