= Murder the Truth =

2025 book by David Enrich

- First edition cover
- Author: David Enrich
- Subject: Freedom of the press in the United States
- Publisher: HarperCollins
- Publication date: 2025
- Pages: 323 (first edition)
- ISBN: 978-0-06-337290-0

Murder the Truth: Fear, the First Amendment, and a Secret Campaign to Protect the Powerful is a 2025 book by David Enrich. The book details the legal movement to overturn the protections offered to journalists writing about public figures that resulted from the 1964 United States Supreme Court decision New York Times Co. v. Sullivan.

== Background ==
Enrich works as an investigative journalist for The New York Times, and over the course of his work, he noticed a rise of retaliatory threats from the subjects of his reporting. These threats occurred at the same time as both rhetoric from politicians and rulings from the Court system and placed pressure on journalists. In an interview with NPR, Enrich reflected on his motivation for the book, telling the host Tonya Mosley: "I just started hearing this litany of really kind of upsetting horror stories from people... pushed to kind of the financial and psychological brink by these threats and by these lawsuits or, in some cases, had faced these threats and essentially decided to not write about certain things".

== Reception ==
In a review for The Washington Post, Quinta Jurecic praised Enrich's reporting on the confluence of factors that led to efforts aimed at overturning Sullivan. Jurecic, however, viewed the book as not providing a convincing explanation for the ideological shift among conservatives regarding freedom of the press, writing: "[Enrich's] account left me wishing for more detail on the intellectual and ideological roots of this shift". Lloyd Green of The Guardian described the book as a "disturbing read on effort to undo free speech in US".
