= No Filter: The Inside Story of Instagram =

2020 book by Sarah Frier

- Author: Sarah Frier
- Language: English
- Genre: Non-fiction
- Publisher: Simon & Schuster
- Publication date: 14 April 2020
- Publication place: United States
- Pages: 352
- ISBN: 978-1982126803

No Filter: The Inside Story of Instagram is a non-fiction book written by American journalist and author Sarah Frier. Published by Simon & Schuster in 2020, the book presents an in-depth look into the history and inner workings of the popular social media platform, Instagram.

== Overview ==
No Filter: The Inside Story of Instagram offers an exhaustive account of Instagram's journey from a small start-up to one of the world's most influential social media platforms. Frier draws on interviews with Instagram's founders, Kevin Systrom and Mike Krieger, as well as employees, competitors, and users to tell the story of Instagram's creation, growth, and acquisition by Facebook.

The book delves into Instagram's distinct ethos of crafting beautiful images, which set it apart from other social media platforms. It also explores the influence Instagram has had on global trends in areas such as food, fashion, and travel, and how it has reshaped the nature of celebrity and advertising.

Frier also investigates the tensions that arose after Facebook's acquisition of Instagram in 2012. The book chronicles the struggles for autonomy within the corporate structure of Facebook and the eventual departure of Systrom and Krieger from the company.

== Reception ==
No Filter received a positive review from The Hindu for its comprehensive and insightful look into the evolution of Instagram. It was praised for its detailed reporting and analysis of the impact of Instagram on society and culture.

The book won the 2020 Financial Times and McKinsey Business Book of the Year Award. In their citation, the judges described "No Filter" as "a compelling saga" filled with "vivid reporting" and "sharp analysis".
