= Fast Second =

2005 economics book

- Author: Paul Geroski and Constantinos Markides
- Language: English
- Publisher: Jossey-Bass, San Francisco
- Publication date: 2005
- ISBN: 0-7879-7154-5
- OCLC: 55077781
- Dewey Decimal: 658.5/75 22
- LC Class: HF5415.153 .M338 2005

Fast Second: How Smart Companies Bypass Radical Innovation to Enter and Dominate New Markets is a book written by Paul Geroski and Constantinos Markides and published by Jossey-Bass in 2005.

According to the authors, a "fast second company" lets other companies innovate and experiment to create new markets. Then the fast second enters the market just as the dominant design is about to emerge, helps create the dominant design, and uses its size to capture the market.

The book identifies Microsoft, Procter & Gamble, Amazon.com, Canon Inc., JVC and Heinz as successful fast second firms.

It was a nominee of the 2005 Financial Times and Goldman Sachs Business Book of the Year Award.

== Publishing information ==
- Geroski, Paul; Constantinos Markides (2005). Fast second: How smart companies bypass radical innovation to enter and dominate new markets. San Francisco: Jossey-Bass. ISBN 0-7879-7154-5.

== See also ==
- First-mover advantage
