= Inmarsat-C =

Satellite communications system

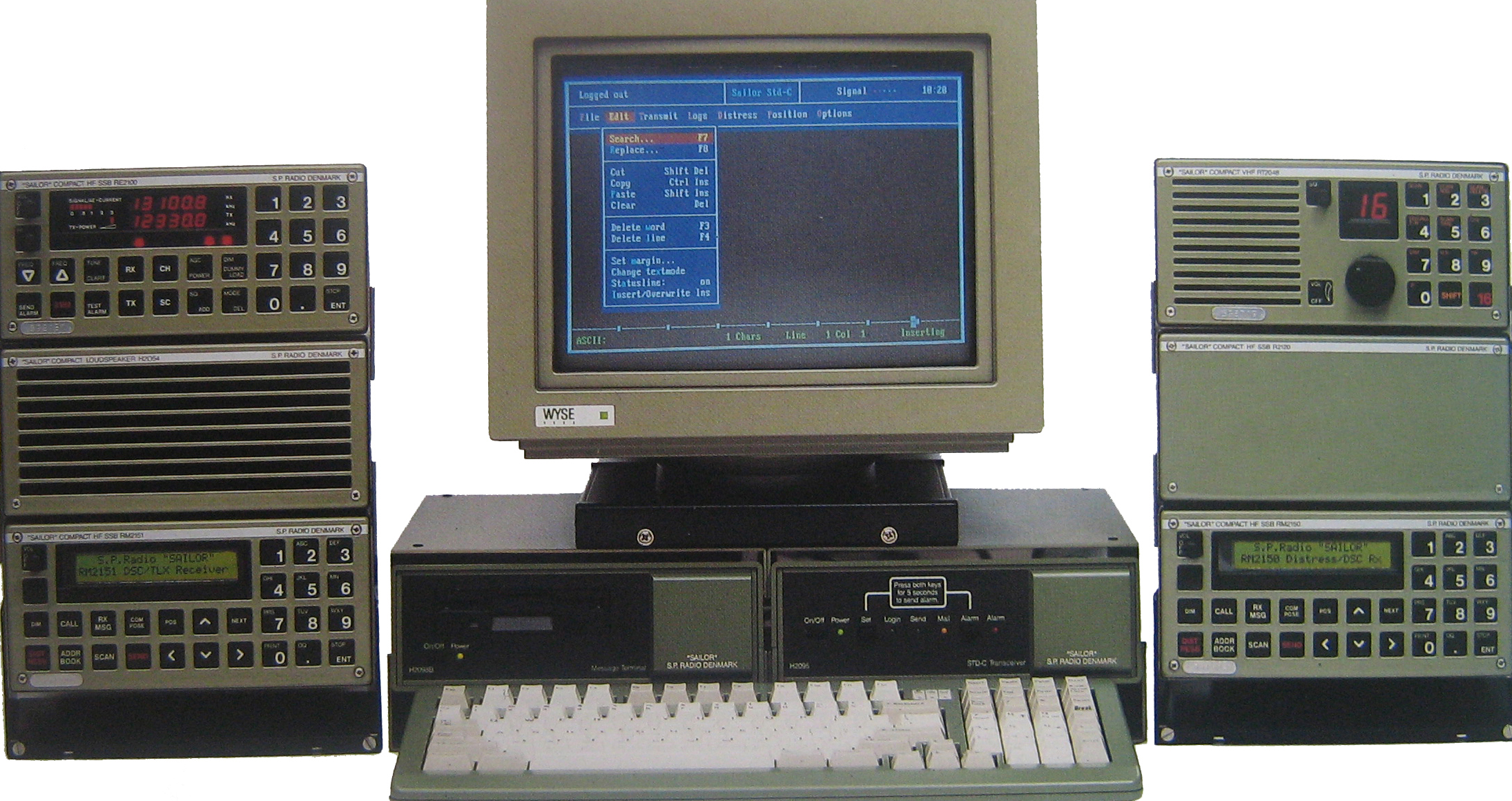
Inmarsat-C terminal (centre)

Inmarsat-C is a two-way, packet data service operated by the telecommunications company Inmarsat which operates between mobile earth stations (MES) and land earth stations (LES). It became fully operational after a period of pre-operational trials in January 1991. The advantages of Inmarsat-C compared to Inmarsat-A are low cost, smaller and uses a smaller omni-directional antenna. The disadvantage is that voice communication is not possible with Inmarsat-C. The service is approved for use under the Global Maritime Distress and Safety System (GMDSS), meets the requirements for Ship Security Alert Systems (SSAS) defined by the International Maritime Organization (IMO) and is the most widely used service in fishing Vessel Monitoring Systems (VMS).

The service works with a store-and-forward method which enables interface with data network transfer including; e-mail; SMS; telex; remote monitoring; tracking (position reporting); chart and weather updates; maritime safety information (MSI); maritime security; GMDSS; and SafetyNET and FleetNET services; two-way messaging; data reporting and polling; Safety/Emergency alerting.

The service is operated via an Inmarsat-C Transceiver or a lower-power mini-C Transceiver. Data transfers between MES and LES at a rate of 600 bits/second. The frequencies for transmitting (TX) are 1626.5 MHz -1645.5 MHz and for receiving (RX) are 1530.0 MHz - 1545.0 MHz.

The service is available for maritime, land mobile and aeronautical use.

This system was also used to track the BBC's project "The Box". BBC News followed a container around the world for a year to tell stories of globalization and the world economy.

== Maritime Rescue Coordination Centers ==
The headquarters for Inmarsat C is located in London. The four Ocean Regions that are covered by Inmarsat C are:

- the Atlantic Ocean Region East (AOR-E)
- Atlantic Ocean Region West (AOR-W)
- Pacific Ocean Region (POR)
- Indian Ocean Region (IOR).

Within each ocean region, there are approximately four or five Maritime Rescue Coordination Centers (MRCC). In total, there are over twenty MRCC's in the world, and each MRCC station contributes to a certain MRCC area. The MRCC stations are located in:

- Wellington (New Zealand)-POR
- Aussaguel (France)-IOR/AOR-E/AOR-W
- Beijing (China)-IOR/POR
- Burum (The Netherlands)-AOR-E/AOR-W/IOR
- Elk (Norway)-AOR-E/AOR-W/IOR
- Emeq Haela (Israel)-AOR-E/IOR
- Fucino (Italy) AOR-E/IOR
- Ex Goonhilly @ Burum (Netherlands)
- Hai Phong (Vietnam)-IOR/POR
- Kumsan (S. Korea) IOR/POR
- Lakhadaria (Algeria) AOR-E
- Nakhodka (Russia)-POR
- Nudol (Russian Fed.)-AOR-E/IOR
- Perth (Australia)-IOR/POR
- Psary (Poland)-AOR-E/IOR
- Pune (India)-IOR
- Santa Paula (USA)-POR
- Sentosa (Singapore)-IOR/POR
- Southbury (USA)-AOR-E/AOR-W
- Tangua (Brazil)-AOR-E
- Thermopylae (Greece)-AOR-E
- Yamaguchi (Japan)-IOR/POR.
