= David Enrich =

American journalist (born 1979)

David Jules Enrich
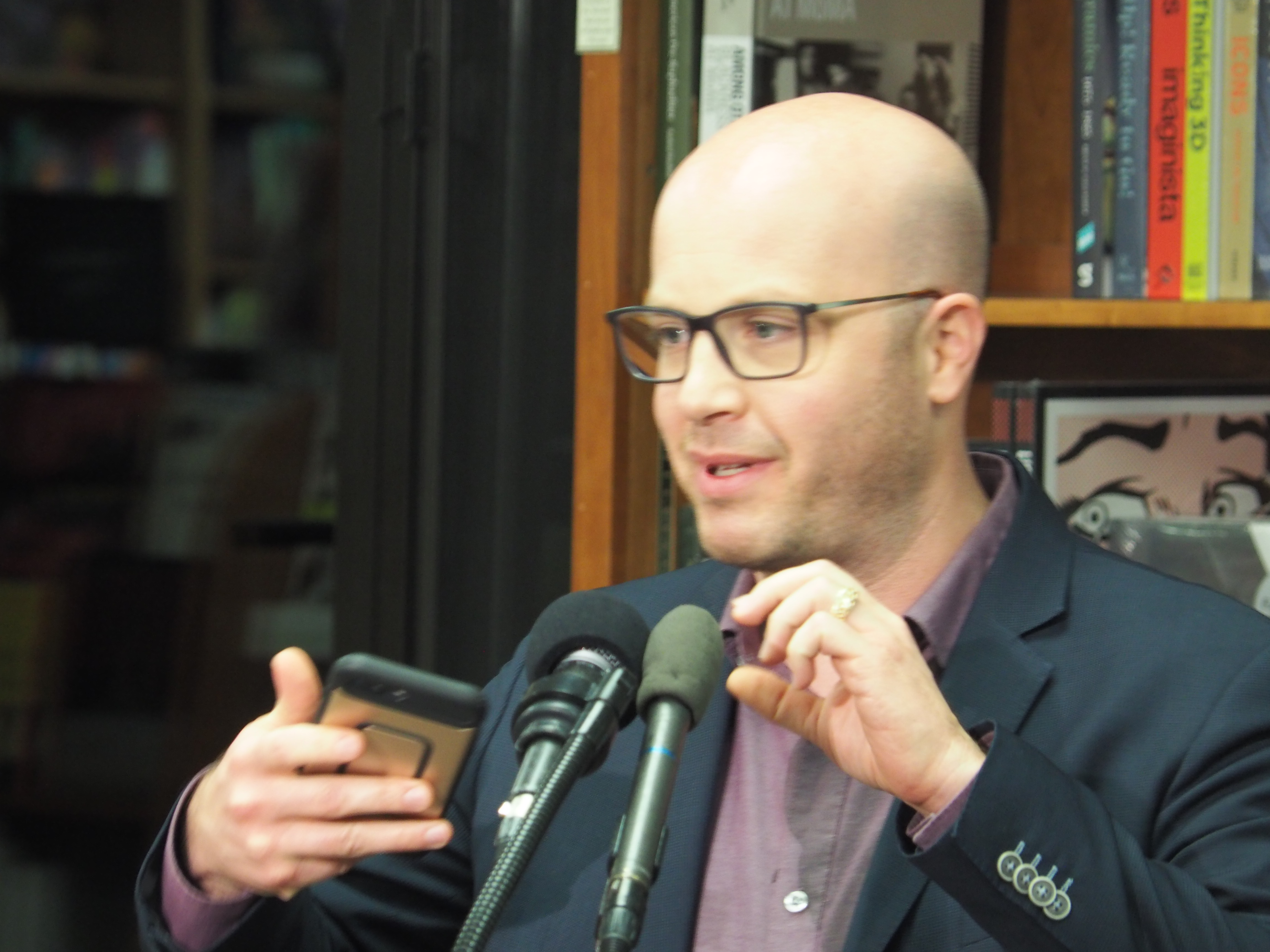
- Born: July 3, 1979 (age 46); Lexington, Massachusetts
- Education: Claremont McKenna College
- Occupation: Journalist
- Years active: 2000–present

David Jules Enrich (born July 3, 1979) is an American journalist and non-fiction author. He is currently business investigations editor, formally financial editor at The New York Times. He was previously financial enterprise editor at The Wall Street Journal.

== Education ==
Enrich received his bachelor's degree in 2001 from Claremont McKenna College in Claremont, California. While in college, Enrich co-founded claremontmckenna.com, the first online newspaper at the five Claremont Colleges. He also founded and directed Citizens for True Democracy, a Southern California grassroots organization that proposes replacing the Electoral College with direct voting.

== Career ==
Enrich worked as an intern at The Nation in the summer of 2000 and at U.S. News & World Report in 2001.

He was a reporter for States News Service in Washington, D.C. He was a reporter with Dow Jones Newswire for several years. He served as a Washington correspondent covering Congress, the White House and federal regulatory agencies for several regional newspapers including the Cleveland Plain Dealer, the Wisconsin State Journal and the Philadelphia Daily News.

Enrich joined the Wall Street Journal in December 2007 as a reporter writing about the U.S. banking industry, with a particular focus on Citigroup.

On October 17, 2013, a British judge ordered Enrich and The Wall Street Journal to comply with a request by the UK's Serious Fraud Office prohibiting the newspaper from publishing names of individuals in the government's ongoing investigation into the Libor scandal. Enrich was threatened with jail if he disobeyed. The situation was covered in the press as an example of the restrictions the media face in the UK from courts that impose reporting restrictions to prevent journalists from reporting details that prosecutors believe could jeopardize an investigation or case and by celebrities keen to cover up indiscretions. Dow Jones & Company, publisher of The Wall Street Journal, described the injunction as "serious affront to press freedom." On October 21, 2013, an English judge said he wouldn't renew the court order, saying there was "no basis" for the reporting restrictions.

In 2016, Enrich returned to New York from London, where he had been European banking editor for The Wall Street Journal, in order to lead a financial-enterprise team tasked with writing in depth on markets, money flows and other aspects of Wall Street.

His book, The Spider Network: The Wild Story of a Math Genius, a Gang of Backstabbing Bankers, and One of the Greatest Scams in Financial History, was published in March 2017 to critical acclaim. National Review called The Spider Network "a nonfiction epic ... an engrossing, entertaining tale." Bloomberg Businessweek called it an "exhaustively reported tale" and author Harlan Coben praised it as a "terrific nonfiction book." The New York Times called it a "vivid depiction of the ethos of the core financial institutions upon which the global economy depends." CNBC and the Financial Times recommended the book as one of their summer reads. It was also shortlisted for the 2017 Financial Times and McKinsey Business Book of the Year Award.

In August 2017, The New York Times announced that they had hired Enrich.

=== Dark Towers ===
Dark Towers: Deutsche Bank, Donald Trump, and an Epic Trail of Destruction came out on February 18, 2020. Harper Collins, its publisher, described the work as a "never-before-told saga of how Deutsche Bank became the global face of financial recklessness and criminality." An updated edition was issued on 12 January 2021.

== Recognition ==
Enrich has received numerous journalism awards, including in 2012 an Overseas Press Club award for coverage of the European debt crisis, a George Polk Award for coverage of insider trading, two SABEW awards and a Gerald Loeb Award for feature writing for "The Unraveling of Tom Hayes". Enrich was also part of teams of Wall Street Journal reporters who were finalists for Pulitzer Prizes in 2009 and 2011.

== Works ==
- Enrich, David (2017). The Spider Network: The Wild Story of a Math Genius, a Gang of Backstabbing Bankers, and One of the Greatest Scams in Financial History. New York: Custom House. ISBN 9780062452986.
- Enrich, David (2020). Dark Towers: Deutsche Bank, Donald Trump, and an Epic Trail of Destruction. New York: Custom House. ISBN 978-0062878816.
- Enrich, David (2022). Servants of the Damned: Giant Law Firms, Donald Trump, and the Corruption of Justice. ISBN 0063266210.
- Murder the Truth: Fear, the First Amendment, and a Secret Campaign to Protect the Powerful (2025)

== See also ==
- Tax returns of Donald Trump
- Wealth of Donald Trump
