= Henry Timms =

British businessman (born 1976)

Henry Timms OBE
- Born: 1976; United Kingdom
- Education: Durham University
- Occupation: CEO of Brunswick Group

Henry Timms is the chief executive officer (CEO) of the Brunswick Group. He was the executive director of the 92nd Street Y. He was then president and CEO of Lincoln Center from 2019 to 2024.

In December 2022, Timms was named an Officer of the Order of the British Empire for services to the arts and to philanthropy.

== Early life and education ==
Henry Timms was born in the United Kingdom. His father was a British archaeologist and his mother was an American illustrator. He was raised in Exeter, England, and graduated from Durham University in 1998 with a degree in History.

== Career ==
Timms began working at the Jewish community center 92nd Street Y in 2008, and became the executive director in 2014. While at 92nd Street Y, Timms was part of founding GivingTuesday in 2012 which has raised funds for charitable causes globally since 2012.

Timms and Jeremy Heimans co-wrote a book in 2018 called New Power which was shortlisted for the Financial Times Business Book of the Year Award.

In 2019 Timms became president and chief executive officer of the Lincoln Center. During his tenure, he prioritized diversity and helped complete the $550 million renovation of David Geffen Hall. In 2024 he left the Lincoln Center to head the public relations firm Brunswick Group.

Timms has been a Hauser Leader at Harvard Kennedy School, as well as holding fellowships at Stanford University's Center on Philanthropy and Civil Society, the University of Oxford, and the United Nations Foundation, and being a member of the Council on Foreign Relations.

== Publications ==
- Heimans, Jeremy; Timms, Henry (January–February 2024). "Leading in a World Where AI Wields Power of Its Own". Harvard Business Review.
