= This Is How They Tell Me the World Ends =

2021 book by Nicole Perlroth

- Language: English
- Published: 2021
- Publisher: Bloomsbury Publishing
- Publication place: USA
- ISBN: 9781526629852

This Is How They Tell Me the World Ends: The Cyberweapons Arms Race is a non-fiction book published in 2021 by American journalist and author Nicole Perlroth. The book's main topic is cyberwarfare, and it examines the rapid proliferation and development of cyberweapons by nation-states and non-state actors. It won the 2021 Financial Times Business Book of the Year Award and was inducted into the Cybersecurity Canon Hall of Fame. It is based on seven years of interviews with over 300 individuals.

== Overview ==
Perlroth investigates the origins of state-sponsored cyberattacks, the evolution of cyberweaponry, and the potential consequences of the ongoing cyber arms race. The book also explores the role of private companies, criminal groups, and individual hackers in developing and deploying these weapons. Perlroth discusses various high-profile cyberattacks, such as the Stuxnet worm and the WannaCry ransomware attack, to illustrate the potentially catastrophic effects of cyberwarfare.

== Background and Author ==
Nicole Perlroth is a cybersecurity journalist and digital espionage reporter working for The New York Times. As of 2023, she was serving as an advisor to the Department of Homeland Security's Cybersecurity and Infrastructure Security Agency (CISA). She has covered numerous high-profile cyber incidents, including state-sponsored attacks and major data breaches. Perlroth's research for the book included interviews with current and former government officials, cybersecurity experts, and hackers.
