= The Art of Choosing =

2010 book by Sheena Iyengar

The Art of Choosing: The Decisions We Make Everyday – What They Say About Us and How We Can Improve Them
- Author: Sheena Iyengar
- Language: English
- Publisher: Twelve Books | Hachette Book Group
- Publication date: April 2010
- Pages: 352
- ISBN: 9780446504102

The Art of Choosing: The Decisions We Make Everyday – What They Say About Us and How We Can Improve Them is a non-fiction book written by Sheena Iyengar, a professor at Columbia Business School known for her research in the field of choice. The book was first published by the imprint Twelve Books of Hachette Book Group in March 2010.

== Overview ==
The Art of Choosing explores the many facets of choice, a cornerstone of the human condition. It delves into how people make choices and the role of choice in our personal and professional lives. Drawing from research in psychology, behavioral economics, and neuroscience, Iyengar explores the complexity behind decision-making processes and offers insights into how choices shape our lives, our world, and our future.

The book also reflects on how cultural and environmental factors influence our choices, arguing that understanding these factors can help us make better decisions.

== Reception ==
The book was a finalist for the 2010 Financial Times Business Book of the Year Award. It was also named a Best Business Book of the Year by The Economist and ranked among Amazon's top ten business and investing books of the year.

Iyengar's exploration of choice in The Art of Choosing has been recognized for its depth and accessibility. Critics praised it for its thoughtful consideration of a complex subject and its ability to blend academic research with real-world examples. Kirkus stated that the book was "[a] lucid work of popular science written by an accomplished practitioner". The book was also reviewed in The Wall Street Journal. An audiobook was later released on Hachette Audio, which was criticised by Publishers Weekly as a choppy reading with "jarring pacing and emphasis".

== Influence and legacy ==
The book's findings have been applied in areas including marketing, policy-making, management, and personal decision-making. It has also influenced subsequent research in the field of choice and decision-making.

The Art of Choosing continues to be a text in psychology and business courses and is frequently cited in academic and popular discussions of choice.
