= The Box (Levinson book) =

2006 non-fiction book by Marc Levinson

- Author: Marc Levinson
- Language: English
- Genre: Non-fiction
- Publisher: Princeton University Press
- Publication date: 2006
- Publication place: United States
- Pages: 392
- ISBN: 0-691-12324-1

The Box: How the Shipping Container Made the World Smaller and the World Economy Bigger is a non-fiction book by Marc Levinson charting the historic rise of the intermodal container (shipping container) and how it changed the economic landscape of the global economy. The New York Times called it "a smart, engaging book".

The book inspired the name for the project "The Box" run by BBC News from September 2008 onwards, in which the BBC were tracking a container for a period of one year.

The Box won a bronze medal in the Independent Publisher Book Awards (2007) in the "Finance/Investment/Economics" category. It also won the 2007 Anderson Medal from the Society for Nautical Research. The Box was shortlisted for the Financial Times and Goldman Sachs Business Book of the Year Award (2006).

== Editions ==
- Levinson, Marc (2006). The Box: How the Shipping Container Made the World Smaller and the World Economy Bigger. Princeton University Press. ISBN 0-691-12324-1.
- Levinson, Marc (2016). The Box: How the Shipping Container Made the World Smaller and the World Economy Bigger (2nd ed.). Princeton University Press. ISBN 978-0-691-17081-7.

The 2nd edition has an extra chapter.

== Chapters ==
1. The World the Box Made
2. Gridlock on the Docks
3. The Trucker
4. The System
5. The Battle for New York's Post
6. Union Disunion
7. Setting the Standard
8. Takeoff
9. Vietnam
10. Ports in a Storm
11. Boom and Bust
12. The Bigness Complex
13. The Shipper's Revenge
14. Just in Time
15. Adding Value

== See also ==
- Dry port – aka "Inland Port"
