= Vijay V. Vaitheeswaran =

American journalist

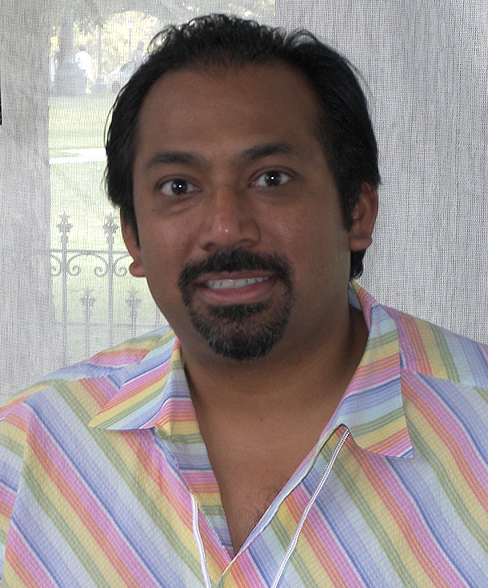
Vijay V. Vaitheeswaran in 2007.

Vijay V. Vaitheeswaran (b. April 5, 1969) was the global energy and climate innovation editor of The Economist through May 2026. Previously he served as The Economist's U.S. business editor and its first China bureau chief. His editorial expertise includes climate change, energy and the environment, business, corporate governance, finance, international trade, geopolitics and economics, science, technology and innovation.

Vaitheeswaran was born in Madras, India and grew up in Cheshire, Connecticut. He graduated from MIT with a degree in mechanical engineering and was named a Harry S. Truman Presidential Scholar by the U.S. Congress.

He started working at The Economist as an intern. After a year as a correspondent, he opened the publication's first office in Latin America, in Mexico City. From 1998 to 2006 he was the Environment and Energy Correspondent for The Economist and from 2007 to 2011 he covered innovation and health issues.

Vijay is a life member at the Council on Foreign Relations. He is an advisor on sustainability and innovation to the World Economic Forum, and a regular speaker at the Clinton Global Initiative. He teaches at NYU's Stern Business School. He served previously as chairman of The Economist's provocative series of conferences on innovation known as the Ideas Economy.

In 2003 he published Power to the People, How the Coming Energy Revolution will Change our Lives, and maybe even Save the Planet. The book pays particular attention to alternative fuel sources, such as those used in the Tesla Roadster (2008) and plug-in hybrids. The book also examines the benefits of distributed power and smart grids. The book was reviewed by Nobel Prize winner (and former Chief Science Advisor to the White House) John Holdren in Scientific American as "by far the most helpful, entertaining, up-to-date and accessible treatment of the energy-economy-environment problematique available."

In 2007, he co-authored ZOOM": The Global Race to Fuel the Car of the Future, with Iain Carson. ZOOM was nominated as a finalist for the Financial Times Business Book of the Year.

His 2012 HarperCollins book on the future of global innovation, Need, Speed and Greed: How the New Rules of Innovation Can Transform Businesses, Propel Nations to Greatness, and Tame the World's Most Wicked Problems, which was called "the perfect primer for the postindustrial age."
