= Stephen Roberts (academic) =

British academic

Stephen Roberts (born March 1965) FREng is a British academic and scientist. He is a professor of machine learning at University of Oxford and leads the Machine Learning Research Group, a sub-group of the Department of Engineering Science.

In 2016 he co-founded Mind Foundry, an artificial intelligence company, along with his colleague professor Michael Osborne.

== Education ==
Roberts received a first-class degree in physics and a DPhil in machine learning. He also completed a PhD in Signal Processing at Imperial College London.

== Career ==
In 1994, Roberts was appointed to the faculty at Imperial College London. Roberts has been faculty at the University of Oxford since 1999 and a professor of machine learning since 2004.

== Honours, advisory roles, and fellowship ==
Professor Roberts is a Fellow of the Royal Academy of Engineering, the Royal Statistical Society, the IET, and the ELLIS Society. He was Director of the Oxford-Man Institute of Quantitative Finance (2014-2021) and is co-lead of the Schmidt AI in Science Fellowship Program (2022-).

He is a professorial fellow of Somerville College at the University of Oxford.

He was a founding director of the EPSRC Centre for Doctoral Training in Autonomous Intelligent Machines and Systems.

He is also a fellow of the Alan Turing Institute.
