= Chokepoints =

2025 book by Edward Fishman

Chokepoints: American Power in the Age of Economic Warfare
- Author: Edward Fishman
- Language: English
- Subject: Current affairs, geopolitics, economic warfare, international relations
- Genre: Nonfiction
- Publisher: Portfolio
- Publication date: 2025
- Publication place: United States
- Pages: 560
- ISBN: 9780593712979

Chokepoints: American Power in the Age of Economic Warfare is a 2025 nonfiction book by Edward Fishman about the growing role of economic warfare and economic statecraft in U.S. foreign policy. It examines how the United States and its allies have used dominant positions in global financial, technological, energy, and maritime networks—described in the book as economic "chokepoints"—in campaigns involving Iran, Russia, and China.

The book was published by Portfolio, an imprint of Penguin Random House, on February 25, 2025.

== Synopsis ==
Chokepoints presents a chronological account of the development of U.S. economic statecraft in the early 21st century. It combines policy analysis with narrative accounts of the government officials involved in developing and implementing financial sanctions, export controls, and related measures.

The book extends the concept of a geographic chokepoint, such as the Bosporus or Strait of Hormuz, to areas of the global economy in which particular countries or groups of countries occupy dominant positions. Examples discussed in the book include the dollar-based financial system, advanced semiconductor supply chains, maritime services, and energy markets. Fishman argues that dependence on these networks can give the countries that control them coercive leverage, while repeated use of that leverage can encourage targeted states to seek alternatives.

After tracing how the development of the postwar global economy concentrated financial and technological power in particular networks, the book examines several episodes in the development of modern U.S. economic warfare: financial pressure against Iran's nuclear program; sanctions imposed on Russia following the annexation of Crimea in 2014; U.S. restrictions on China's access to advanced semiconductor technology; and the financial, technological, and energy measures adopted by the United States and its allies following the Russian invasion of Ukraine in 2022.

In its concluding chapters, the book considers the consequences of the increasing use of economic coercion, including efforts by targeted countries to reduce their dependence on Western-controlled economic networks and the resulting fragmentation of the global economy. Fishman also proposes a geoeconomic "impossible trinity": that economic interdependence, economic security, and geopolitical competition cannot all be sustained simultaneously.

== Reception ==
In The Wall Street Journal, Daniel Yergin called Chokepoints a "compelling and dramatic narrative" and "a timely guide to the fragmenting of the global economy and the rising tensions that go with it." The Economist described the book as a "timely, riveting world tour" and praised Fishman's chronological account of how American economic weapons developed through trial, error, and political pressure, saying that the approach "makes for a cracking yarn". In the Financial Times, Max Harris called Chokepoints "a masterful narrative of US economic warfare in the 21st century" and praised Fishman's "clear and thoughtful writing", while arguing that he "erased himself too thoroughly" from events in which he had participated and too rarely offered his own views on the policies he recounts.

Dartmouth political scientist Michael Mastanduno, writing in Business Economics, called Chokepoints an "excellent and ambitious book" and an "invaluable resource", praising its research and detailed reconstruction of U.S. and allied decision-making. He nevertheless argued that, although the cases demonstrate the ability of economic weapons to impose substantial costs, their record of translating economic pressure into foreign-policy influence has been disappointing. Katja Bego, writing in International Affairs, described the book as "a highly insightful, timely and well-written contemporary history of one of the least understood but most critical components of US foreign policy over the past 20 years." She also emphasized the limits of sanctions when targeted governments are willing to absorb economic costs.

In Foreign Policy, Keith Johnson called Chokepoints a "delightful read" and said that for readers seeking an accessible account of the development and future of American economic warfare, the book was "invaluable". He also emphasized Fishman's warning that repeated use of American-controlled chokepoints gives other countries incentives to develop alternatives to the dollar-based and Western-led systems on which U.S. leverage depends. Alex Zerden in Lawfare praised the book's combination of diplomatic history with detailed technical explanations of economic weapons and described it as an "essential guide", while arguing that its emphasis on Iran, Russia, and China left less room for other instruments and cases. In Survival, Chris Clague called Chokepoints an important contribution to geoeconomics and the "best behind-the-scenes account to date" of American economic coercion, while emphasizing the difficulty of translating economic pressure into geopolitical outcomes.

Quinn Slobodian offered a more critical assessment in The New York Review of Books, arguing that Fishman stopped short of fully evaluating the reliability and consequences of economic coercion. He contended that repeated use of economic chokepoints has encouraged adversaries to develop alternatives and made some U.S. allies more skeptical of American economic warfare.

The book also received reviews from Jacobin, National Review, and City Journal.

== Awards and recognition ==
Name	Organization	Year	Reference
Business Book of the Year Finalist	Financial Times	2025	
The New York Times bestseller	The New York Times	2025	
Best Books of 2025	The Economist	2025	
Best Books of 2025	Financial Times	2025	
Books We Love 2025	NPR	2025	
Best Books of 2025	Bloomberg	2025	
Non-fiction Bestseller List	The Straits Times	2026	
