= Mind Foundry =

UK Artificial Intelligence Company

- Type: Scale-up
- Industry: Artificial intelligence
- Founded: 2016
- Founder: Stephen Roberts; Maike Osborne
- Headquarters: Oxford, Oxfordshire, United Kingdom
- Number of employees: 75-100 (2023)
- Website: www.mindfoundry.ai

Mind Foundry is a British multinational artificial intelligence company based in Oxford, Oxfordshire, United Kingdom. The company is a spin-out of the University of Oxford and was founded by two professors of machine learning at the university, Stephen Roberts. and Maike Osborne. The company specialises in “AI for high-stakes applications”. Mind Foundry primarily operates in three sectors: Insurance, Infrastructure, and Defence & National Security.

== History ==
Mind Foundry was founded in 2016 out of the Machine Learning Research Group at the University of Oxford by professors Stephen Roberts and Maike Osborne.

Mind Foundry received investment from Oxford Science Enterprises and Parkwalk Advisors in an initial seed round in 2016.

In 2019 the company appointed Brian Mullins as its CEO. As of June 2025, Jiro Okochi is the company's Chairman and Interim CEO.

In 2020 the company raised $13.6 million investment in a Series A round that was led by Aioi Nissay Dowa Insurance Company Ltd (ANDI), part of the MS&AD Insurance Group. Other investors in the series A round included Parkwalk Advisors, Oxford Sciences Innovation, the University of Oxford, and the Oxford Technology and Innovations EIS Fund.

In February 2023 it was announced that Mind Foundry had launched a commercial research and development laboratory in Oxford in partnership with ANDI called the Aioi R&D Lab - Oxford. The Aioi R&D Lab - Oxford "brings together experts from numerous disciplines to apply cutting-edge research on projects that solve global-scale issues affecting society today, and in the future."

In 2023 Mind Foundry raised a further $22 million in investment in a series B round, bringing the total amount the company has raised to date to $44 million.

Mind Foundry and Aioi Nissay Dowa Insurance were named winners in the UK–Japan Partnership category at the British Business Awards gala by the British Chamber of Commerce in Japan in November 2023.

In January 2025 Mind Foundry was named at number 11 in The Times Tech 100, a list ranking Britain's fastest-growing private tech companies.
