= Sheena Iyengar =

Professor at Columbia Business School

Sheena S. Iyengar
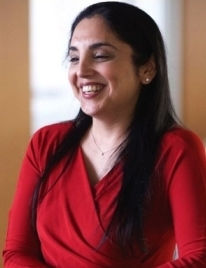
- Iyengar at Columbia Business School
- Born: Sheena Sethi; Toronto, Ontario, Canada
- Education: Stanford University; University of Pennsylvania
- Occupation: S.T. Lee Professor of Business
- Employer: Columbia Business School
- Known for: Academic research on Choice; Books: Art of Choosing 2010, Think Bigger 2023
- Website: sheenaiyengar.com

Sheena S. Iyengar is a Canadian born academic who is the S.T. Lee Professor of Business and Chair of The Management Department at Columbia Business School, and founder of a startup called Think Bigger Innovation. She is best known as an expert on choice, particularly for her "Jam Study." Her research focuses on the many facets of decision making, including: why people want choice, what affects how and what people choose, and how decision making can be improved. She has presented TED talks on choice with over 7 million views and is the author of The Art of Choosing (2010) and Think Bigger: How To Innovate (2023). She is the recipient of numerous honors, including two Axiom Business Book Awards and The Thinkers50 Innovation award.

== Early life and education ==
Iyengar was born in Toronto, Ontario, Canada. Her parents were immigrants from Delhi, India. As a child, she was diagnosed with a rare form of retinitis pigmentosa, an inherited disease of retinal degeneration. By the age of nine, she could no longer read. By the age of sixteen, she was completely blind, although able to perceive light. She remains blind as an adult.

Iyengar's father died of a heart attack when she was thirteen. This change in family circumstances, and Iyengar's loss of vision, prompted Iyengar's mother to steer her towards higher education and self-sufficiency, saying to Iyengar: "I don't want to hear about men or boys, you've got to stand on your own two feet." In 1992, she graduated from the University of Pennsylvania with a BS in economics from the Wharton School and a BA in psychology from the College of Arts and Sciences. She then earned her PhD in Social Psychology from Stanford University in 1997.

For her dissertation "Choice and its Discontents," Iyengar received the Best Dissertation Award for 1998 from the Society of Experimental Social Psychology.

== Career ==
Iyengar's first faculty appointment was at the Sloan School of Management at MIT from July 1997 to June 1998. In 1998, Iyengar joined the faculty at the Columbia Business School, starting as an assistant professor. She has been a full professor at Columbia from July 2007 onward and, since November 2009, the inaugural S.T. Lee Professor of Business.

Iyengar's principal line of research concerns the psychology of choice, and she has been studying how people perceive and respond to choice since the 1990s. She has authored or coauthored over 30 journal articles. Her research and statements have been cited in print media, including by Bloomberg Businessweek, CityLab, Money Magazine, The New York Times, and The Washington Post. Media appearances include The Diane Rehm Show (NPR) and Marketplace (APM).

Iyengar was the recipient of the 2001 Presidential Early Career Award for Scientists and Engineers for, as the NSF said, "helping lead to a better understanding of how cultural, individual, and situational dimensions of human decision-making can be used to improve people's lives." In 2011, Iyengar was named a member of the Thinkers50, a global ranking of the top 50 management thinkers. In 2012, she was awarded the Dean's Award for Outstanding Core Teaching from Columbia Business School.

=== Non-academic works ===
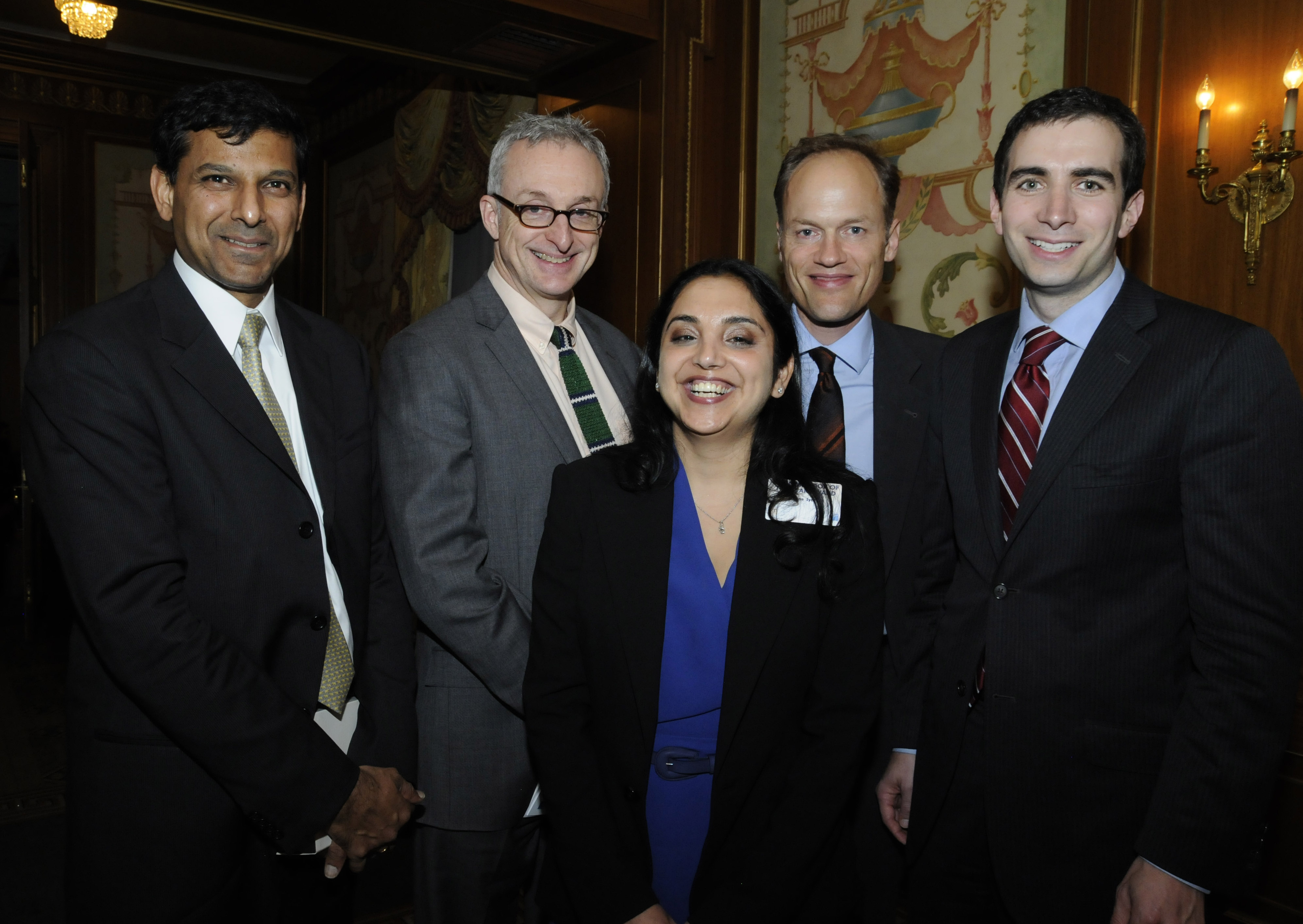
Sheena Iyengar (center) and other authors shortlisted for the 2010 Financial Times and Goldman Sachs Business Book of the Year Award

Iyengar has written non-academic articles, including for CNN and Slate, and book chapters. She has presented two TED talks: "The Art of Choosing" (2010) and "How to Make Choosing Easier" (2012).

Iyengar is best known for her 2010 book The Art of Choosing, which explores the mysteries of choice in everyday life. It was listed third in Amazon's top ten books in Business & Investing of 2010 and was shortlisted for the 2010 Financial Times and Goldman Sachs Business Book of the Year Award. In the Afterword of the 2011 edition of The Art of Choosing, Iyengar distills one aspect of her work explaining and advocating for choice, arguing for people to take responsibility for their lives and not rely on a supposed fate determined by some "greater force out there." She says: "Choice allows us to be architects of our future."

In 2023, Iyengar published her second book titled Think Bigger: How to Innovate. She founded a start-up based on her methodology, Think Bigger Innovation, that embeds AI into ideation and choice mapping in a product that helps businesses solve complex problems and innovate.

== Personal life ==
Iyengar is divorced from Garud Iyengar, another Columbia University professor, with whom she has one child.
