= Maike Osborne =

Machine learning professor and entrepreneur

- Born: Michael Osborne; 1982 (age 43–44)
- Education: University of Western Australia (BEng, BSc); University of Oxford (PhD)
- Known for: Bayesian approaches to AI and machine learning Probabilistic numerics "The Future of Employment: How Susceptible are Jobs to Computerisation?"
- Awards: Fellow of the ELLIS society
- Scientific career
- Fields: Machine learning, Bayesian methods, probabilistic numerics
- Workplaces: University of Oxford; Mind Foundry; Oxford Martin School

Maike Osborne (born Michael Osborne, 1982) is an Australian academic and scientist who serves as a professor of machine learning at University of Oxford in the Machine Learning Research Group in the Department of Engineering Science.

In 2016 she co-founded Mind Foundry, an artificial intelligence company, along with fellow professor Stephen Roberts.

== Education ==
She has a BEng in Mechanical Engineering and a BSc in both Pure Mathematics and Physics from the University of Western Australia. She has a PhD in Machine Learning from the University of Oxford.

== Career ==
Osborne has contributed to over 100 publications, and her work has received over 24,000 citations with an h-index of 46 according to Google Scholar. and has acted as principal or co-investigator for £10.6M of research funding.

Her career has focused in particular on Bayesian approaches to AI and machine learning, named after the famous British statistician Thomas Bayes. Osborne's work has contributed to Probabilistic numerics, with Osborne co-authoring the first textbook on the subject.

In 2013, Osborne co-authored a paper alongside Swedish-German economist Carl Benedikt Frey called "The Future of Employment: How Susceptible are Jobs to Computerisation?". The paper has received over 13,000 citations and extensive media coverage.

In 2023 Osborne gave oral evidence to the UK House of Commons Science and Technology Committee on the subject of the "Governance of Artificial Intelligence". Her testimony received significant coverage around her warnings of the threat of "rogue AI".

== Honors ==
She is also an Official Fellow of Exeter College, and Lecturer at St Peter's College, Oxford,, a Fellow of the ELLIS society. She joined the Oxford Martin School in 2015 as Lead Researcher on the Oxford Martin Programme on Technology and Employment and is Co-Director of the Oxford Martin AI Governance Initiative. She is a Director of the EPSRC Centre for Doctoral Training in Autonomous Intelligent Machines and Systems.
