= Chris Miller (academic) =

American historian

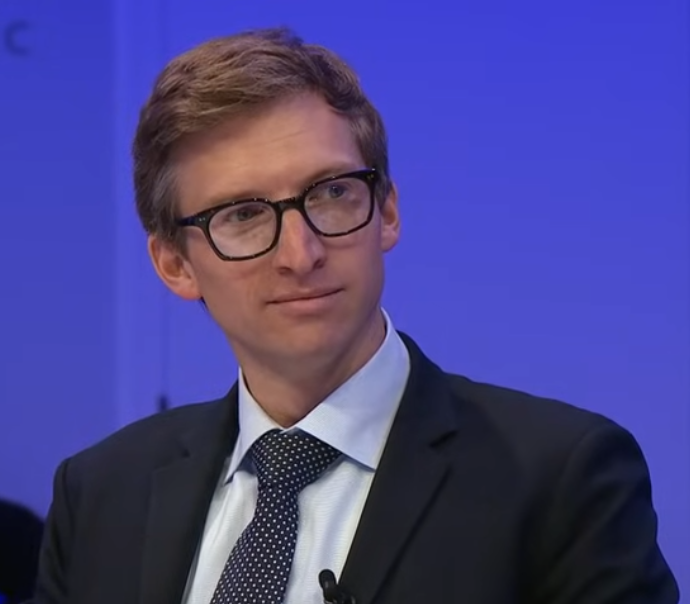
- Miller at the 2024 World Economic Forum

Academic background
- Education: Harvard University (BA); Yale University (MA, PhD)

Academic work
- Discipline: History
- Institutions: Tufts University
- Main interests: International Relations; Artificial Intelligence; Russian Studies; Semiconductors
- Notable works: Chip War (2022)
- Website: https://www.christophermiller.net/

Christopher R. Miller is an American historian, specializing in economic history and international relations. He is the author of the book Chip War. He is a professor at Tufts University and a nonresident senior fellow at the American Enterprise Institute.

== Early life and education ==
Miller attended Harvard College, where he graduated with a Bachelor of Arts in history in 2009. While at Harvard he won the Hoopes Prize for outstanding scholarly work. He then attended Yale University, where he received a Master of Arts in 2011 and a Ph.D. in 2015.

== Career ==
While at Yale, Miller was a director at the Program in Grand Strategy. In 2017, he became a professor at the Fletcher School of Law and Diplomacy at Tufts University. In 2022, he published Chip War, a book on the history of semiconductors. The book was critically acclaimed, winning the Financial Times Business Book of the Year Award and the Council on Foreign Relations Arthur Ross Book Award.

Miller frequently comments on the semiconductor industry and U.S.-China relations. He has praised the CHIPS Act and has written extensively about the future of the semiconductor race under the Trump administration.

== Bibliography ==
- The Struggle to Save the Soviet Economy: Mikhail Gorbachev and the Collapse of the USSR (University of North Carolina Press, 2016)
- Putinomics: Power and Money in Resurgent Russia (University of North Carolina Press, 2018)
- We Shall Be Masters: Russian Pivots to East Asia from Peter the Great to Putin (Harvard University Press, 2021)
- Chip War: The Fight for the World's Most Critical Technology (Scribner, 2022)

== See also ==
- Artificial Intelligence Cold War
- Second Cold War
