= Michael William Morris =

American academic (born 1964)

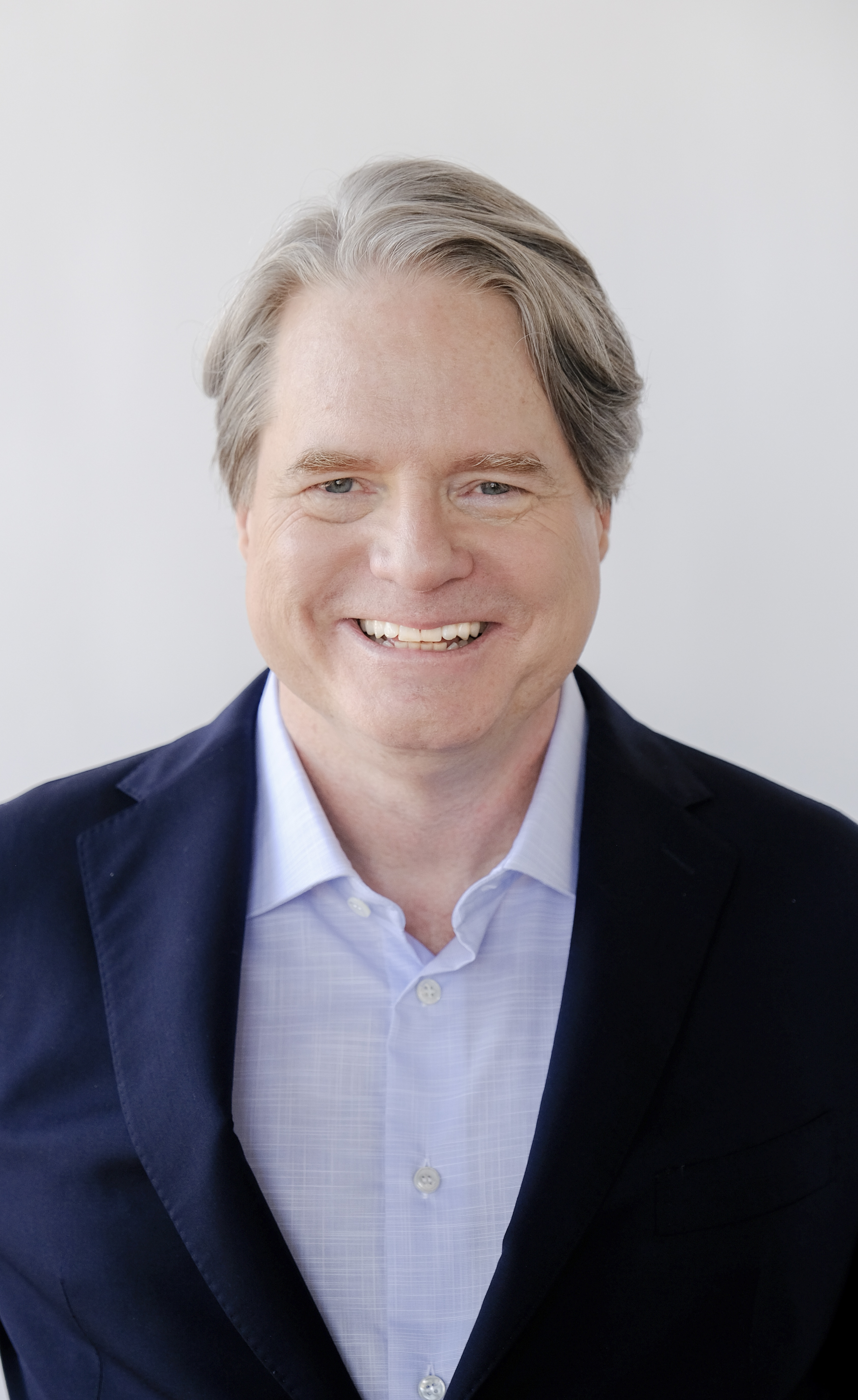
- Education: University of Michigan Ph.D., 1993; Brown University B.A., 1986
- Scientific career
- Fields: Social psychology, Organizational behavior
- Workplaces: Columbia University 2001–present Stanford University 1992–2002
- Website: business.columbia.edu/faculty/people/michael-morris michaelwmorris.com

Michael William Morris is an American cultural psychologist and business professor at Columbia University. He teaches primarily at its Graduate School of Business, where he founded its Leadership Lab. Additionally, Morris is affiliated with the Psychology Department and the Committee on Global Thought.

== Early life and education ==
Morris was born in New York City in 1964. His family moved to Liberty, NY, where he attended school. Morris started college at University of Rochester to focus on distance running. After a term at the London School of Economics, he transferred to Brown University and completed degrees in English literature and in cognitive science.

He pursued graduate education in psychology at the University of Michigan, where research on cultural psychology was coalescing.

== Academic career ==
Morris began as a professor at Stanford University in 1993, in the Graduate School of Business. He served as a visiting professor in 1995 at the Chinese University of Hong Kong and in 2000 at the University of Hong Kong. In 2001, he started at Columbia Business School as a full professor and in 2006 earned the Chavkin-Chang Chair of Leadership.

Morris has served as an associate editor at Psychological Review and special-issue editor at Organizational Behavior and Human Decision Processes. He is currently a consulting editor at Management and Organization Review, and also at Journal of International Business Studies.

Morris has authored hundreds of scientific papers, which have accumulated over 30,000 citations by fellow scholars. In addition to his academic papers, Morris has written for Forbes, Harvard Business Review, Time, and other outlets. He is often interviewed in the media on topics relevant to his research. His 2024 book, Tribal: How the Cultural Instincts that Divide Us Can Help Bring Us Together, was well-reviewed.

== Awards ==
- 1993, Outstanding Dissertation Award, Society of Experimental Social Psychology.
- 1996, Hillel Einhorn Award to the best paper by a young investigator, Society for Judgment and Decision Making.
- 1999, Ascendant Scholar Award, Western Academy of Management.
- 2001, Otto Klineberg Intercultural & International Relations Award, Society for the Psychological Study of Social Issues.
- 2005 Misumi Award for Best Contribution to Asian Social Psychology, Asian Association of Social Psychology.
- 2021 Responsible Research in Management Award, Academy of Management Fellows.
- 2023, Outstanding Contribution to Cultural Psychology Award, Society for Personality and Social Psychology.
- 2025, Distinguished Scholarly Contribution Award, International Association for Chinese Management Research.

== Books ==
- 2022, Morris appears in the videobook of Cialdini’s classic Influence, LIT.
- 2024, Morris, Michael. Tribal: How the Cultural Instincts That Divide Us Can Help Bring Us Together, Penguin. ISBN 978-0-7352-1809-3

== Teaching ==
At Columbia Business School, Morris teaches the core class, Lead: People, Teams, and Organizations. He also teaches the electives Managerial Negotiations and The Leader’s Voice. He has been recognized with the school's Innovation in the Classroom award.
