= Constantinos C. Markides =

Cypriot business theorist

- Born: 1960 (age 65–66)
- Occupation: Strategic leadership

Academic background
- Education: Professor
- Alma mater: Boston University & Harvard Business School

Academic work
- Discipline: Strategic leadership
- Institutions: London Business School

Constantinos C. Markides (born 1960) is a Cypriot management educator and, since 1990, the Robert P. Bauman Professor of Strategic Leadership at London Business School (London, UK). He is known for his work on strategic disruption and business models which is particularly illustrated in his book Game Changing Strategies published in 2008. He was listed on the Forbes.com list of Most Influential Management Gurus (2009).

== Education ==
A native of Cyprus, he received a BA (Distinction) and MA in Economics from Boston University, MBA and DBA from the Harvard Business School.

== Career ==
Constantinos worked as a research associate at the Harvard Business School and has completed research and published on the topics of international competitiveness, corporate restructuring, refocusing and international acquisitions (in journals such as the Harvard Business Review, MIT Sloan Management Review, Directors & Boards, Long range planning, British Journal of Management, Journal of International Business Studies, Strategic Management Journal and the Academy of Management Journal.)

He is on the Editorial Board of the Strategic Management Journal and the MIT Sloan Management Review. Constantinos was also a Fellow of the World Economic Forum in Davos.

== Selected works ==
- 1995. Diversification, Refocusing and Economic Performance. MIT Press
- 2000. All the Right Moves: A Guide to Crafting Breakthrough Strategy. Harvard Business School Press ISBN 978-0-87584-833-4
- 2004 (with Paul Geroski). Fast second: How smart companies bypass radical innovation to enter and conquer new markets. Jossey-Bass ISBN 978-0-7879-7154-0
- 2008. Game-Changing Strategies: How to Create New Market Space in Established Industries by Breaking the Rules. Jossey-Bass ISBN 978-0-4702-7687-7
