= Edward Fishman =

American diplomat and scholar

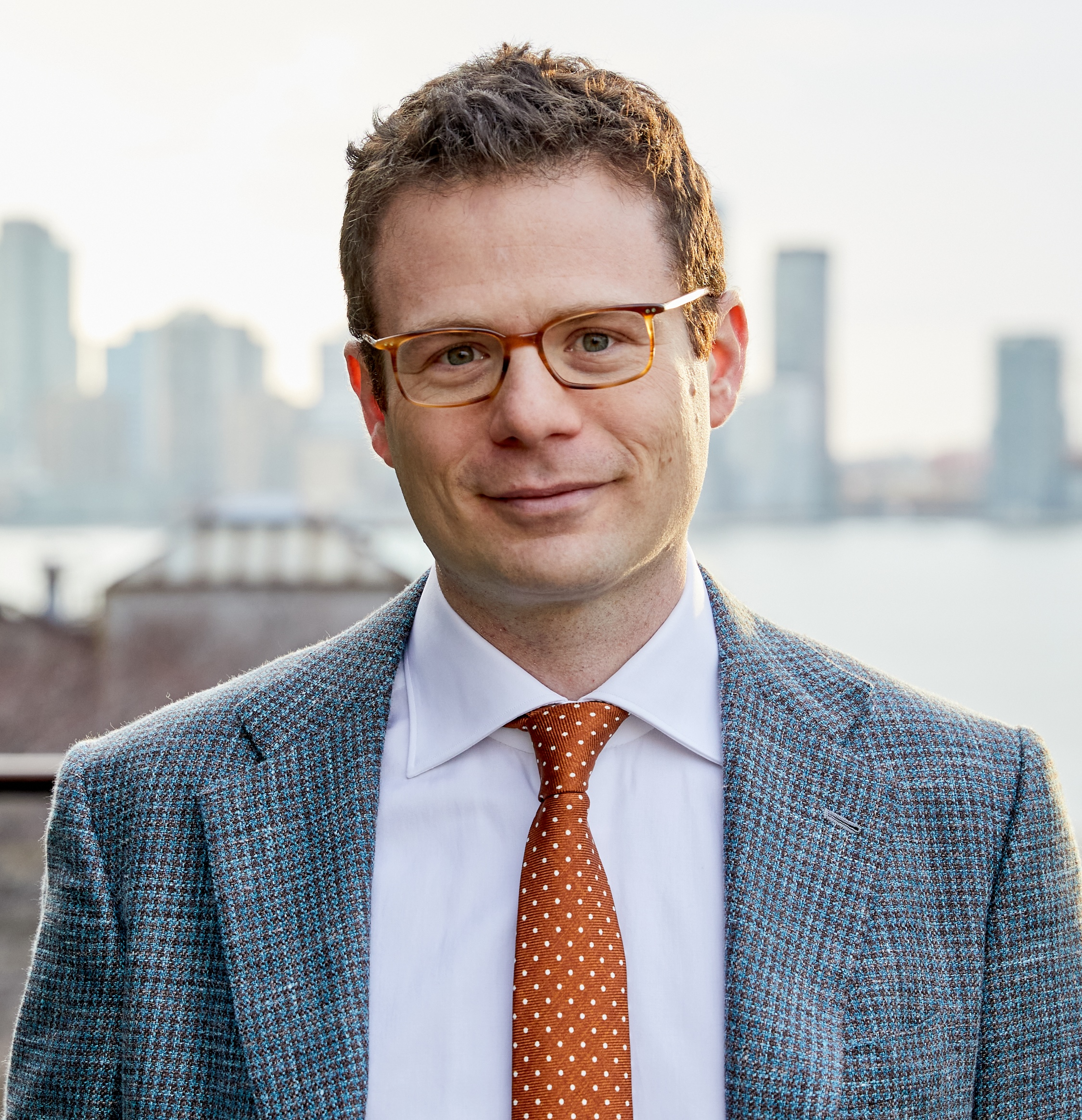
- Born: Bryn Mawr, Pennsylvania
- Education: Yale University; University of Cambridge; Stanford University
- Occupations: Diplomat scholar author
- Notable work: Chokepoints: American Power in the Age of Economic Warfare

Edward Fishman is an American author, international relations scholar, and former diplomat who is Senior Fellow and Director of the Maurice R. Greenberg Center for Geoeconomics at the Council on Foreign Relations. He is also an Adjunct Professor of International and Public Affairs at Columbia University. He is the author of Chokepoints: American Power in the Age of Economic Warfare.

Previously Fishman was a member of the U.S. Secretary of State's Policy Planning Staff and the Russia and Europe Lead in the U.S. State Department's Office of Economic Sanctions Policy and Implementation.

He has also served in roles at the U.S. Department of Defense and the U.S. Department of the Treasury.

Outside ogovernment Fishman has been an editor at Foreign Affairs and has written articles in The New York Times, The Wall Street Journal, The Atlantic, and Washington Post.

== Early life and education ==
Fishman grew up in Bryn Mawr, Pennsylvania. He earned a B.A. in history from Yale University, where he was elected to Phi Beta Kappa as part of the class of 2011. He also earned an M.Phil. in international relations from the University of Cambridge; and an MBA from Stanford University, where he graduated as an Arjay Miller Scholar.

== Career ==
Between 2011 and 2017 Fishman served in various roles at the U.S. Department of State, the U.S. Department of Defense, and the U.S. Department of the Treasury. In 2011, Fishman served as special assistant to the Under Secretary for Terrorism and Financial Intelligence at the Treasury Department. From 2013 to 2014, Fishman was a member of the Iran sanctions team at the State Department, focusing on strengthening sanctions during international nuclear negotiations.

In 2014 Fishman served as a special assistant to the Chairman of the Joint Chiefs of Staff at the Pentagon, within the Defense Department.

After Russia's 2014 annexation of Crimea, Fishman served as the first Russia and Europe Lead in the State Department's Office of Economic Sanctions Policy and Implementation. He contributed to designing sanctions on Russia and negotiating them with the EU and the G7 in response to the Ukraine crisis.

From 2015 to 2017 Fishman was a member of the U.S. Secretary of State's Policy Planning Staff, where he advised on Europe and Eurasia and led initiatives on economic sanctions and strategic planning.

== Writing ==
Fishman began his career as an editor at Foreign Affairs. He has published articles in The New York Times, The Wall Street Journal, Foreign Affairs, Boston Review, and Politico Magazine, among other publications. He is also the author of Chokepoints: American Power in the Age of Economic Warfare.

=== Selected publications ===
- Fishman, Edward, "How to Fight an Economic War: A Field Manual for a Ruptured World", Foreign Affairs, vol. 105, no. 3 (May/June 2026), pp. 40–56. "The United States and China possess the most formidable arsenals [for conducting economic warfare], but as the war in Iran has shown, smaller powers can also exact devastating costs on the global economy by weaponizing chokepoints [including, prominently, geographical chokepoints such as the Strait of Hormuz]. [p. 42.] ... True [economic] chokepoints share three characteristics. A single country or coalition of close allies possesses a dominant, concentrated market share [of something]. Substitutes are unavailable in the short term. And the country or coalition can weaponize its position in ways that impose asymmetric pressure, inflicting substantial pain on the target while suffering minimal self-harm. [p. 43.] ... The United States ushered in the age of economic warfare by learning to weaponize chokepoints. Now, other countries have learned to do the same." (p. 56,)
- Fishman, Edward (2025). Chokepoints: American Power in the Age of Economic Warfare. United States: Penguin Group. ISBN 9780593712979.
- Fishman, Edward (2017). "Even Smarter Sanctions: How to Fight in the Era of Economic Warfare". Foreign Affairs. 96 (6): 102–110. JSTOR 44823825.
- Fishman, Edward; Harrell, Peter; Rosenberg, Elizabeth (2017). "A Blueprint for New Sanctions on North Korea". Foreign Affairs. JSTOR resrep06213.
- Fishman, Edward; Mohandas, Siddharth (August 3, 2020). "A Council of Democracies Can Save Multilateralism". Foreign Affairs.
- Fishman, Edward (February 23, 2023). "A Tool of Attrition". Foreign Affairs.
- Fishman, Edward; Miller, Chris (May 17, 2022). "The Right Way to Sanction Russian Energy". Foreign Affairs.

== Awards and recognition ==
Fishman has received the U.S. State Department's Superior Honor Award twice and the Meritorious Honor Award for his contributions to U.S. policy concerning Ukraine, Russia, Belarus, and Iran.
