= Marc Levinson =

Financial journalist

Marc Levinson is an American historian, economist, and author who has written extensively about business, economics, regulation, and international trade.

== Biography ==
Levinson worked for many years as a journalist, including as editorial director of The Journal of Commerce, then a daily newspaper; as a business writer at Newsweek magazine; and as finance and economics editor of The Economist. He worked for JP Morgan Chase, where he developed the company's environmental research for institutional investor clients. He was senior fellow for international business at the Council on Foreign Relations. He managed transportation and industry analysis for the U.S. Congress at the Congressional Research Service.

Levinson has written for many popular and scholarly journals. In addition to reviewing books for The Wall Street Journal, he has contributed to Harvard Business Review, The New York Times, Foreign Affairs, Bloomberg, Aeon, and many other publications and websites. He has spoken to audiences in Europe, Asia, and North America about the world economy, trade, supply chains, infrastructure, and shipping, and has been a guest on many broadcasts and podcasts. He is frequently interviewed in U.S. and foreign media.

Levinson completed undergraduate studies at Antioch College. He later earned a master's degree in public administration from Georgia State University and a degree in public and international affairs from Princeton University. He received a doctorate in history from the Graduate Center of City University of New York.

== Books ==
=== Guide to Financial Markets ===
The Economist Guide to Financial Markets is for laypeople who want to understand how financial markets work, published by The Economist. It was published in a seventh edition in 2018.

=== The Box ===
The Box is a history of how the shipping container contributed to making globalization possible. It became a best seller and has been translated into a dozen languages.

Joe Nocera of The New York Times included The Box in his list of "Best Business Books Ever", saying "Hard to believe you can write a great book about the rise and importance of the shipping container, but he pulled it off." The Box was praised by Bill Gates, who wrote, “The move to containerized shipping had an amazing impact on the global economy." Business Week and the Globe and Mail cited it as one of the best business books of 2006. The Box was shortlisted for the Financial Times/Goldman Sachs Business Book of the Year Award in 2006, won a bronze medal in the Independent Publisher Book Awards (2007), and also won the 2007 Anderson Medal from the Society for Nautical Research.

=== The Great A&P ===
The Great A&P and the Struggle for Small Business in America explores the conflict between Americans’ professed faith in market forces and their desire to protect familiar local businesses from the forces of competition. It is a history of the Great Atlantic & Pacific Tea Company, better known as A&P, an American grocery chain that was the world's largest retailer from 1920 to 1962 and faced frequent attacks from politicians who accused it of destroying small businesses by selling food too cheaply. A second edition, published in 2019, included an added chapter comparing A&P with Amazon, another retail giant that has come under scrutiny for potentially anticompetitive practices.

The Great A&P was named one of the ten best nonfiction books of 2011 by The Wall Street Journal.

=== An Extraordinary Time ===
An Extraordinary Time: The End of the Postwar Boom and the Return of the Ordinary Economy recounts the global collapse of the postwar economic boom in the 1970s and the adoption of free-market ideas in many countries as political leaders sought to restore rapid economic growth. The book’s contention that governments have little ability to accelerate the productivity growth that underlies improved living standards has been controversial. The Washington Post named it one of the best economics books of 2016.

=== Outside the Box ===
Outside the Box: How Globalization Changed from Moving Stuff to Spreading Ideas examines how businesses began to reshape their international supply chains once they began to account for the risks of supply chain interruptions. The book makes the case that goods trade is likely to grow more slowly than the world economy in future years while the globalization of trade in intangibles such as services will become more important. Outside the Box received the Axiom Business Book Awards gold medal in the international business category in 2022.

=== The UPS Man ===
The UPS Man: James E. Casey and the Creation of Modern Logistics profiles James E. Casey, a shy, innovative, and sometimes ruthless entrepreneur who built the United Parcel Service from a bicycle messenger service into a delivery leader that changed the global supply chain. The UPS Man was longlisted for the Financial Times/Standard Chartered Business Book of the Year Award in 2026.

== Works ==
- After Reagan: Confronting the Changed Global Economy (with C. Michael Aho, 1988)
- Beyond Free Markets: The Revival of Activist Economics (1988)
- The Economist Guide to Financial Markets (1999, 7th ed 2018)
- The Box: The World Smaller and the World Economy Bigger (2006, 2nd ed 2016)
- An Extraordinary Time: The End of the Postwar Boom and the Return of the Ordinary Economy (2016)
- The Great A&P and the Struggle for Small Business in America, (2011, 2nd ed 2019)
- Outside the Box: How Globalization Changed from Moving Stuff to Spreading Ideas (2020)

== Awards ==
- 2006 Financial Times Business Book of the Year Award shortlist for The Box
- 2007 Society for Nautical Research, Anderson Medal for The Box
- 2007 Independent Publisher Book Awards, Bronze Medal for The Box
