= Paul Geroski =

British economist

- Born: 18 October 1952; Pleasantville, New York, U.S.
- Died: 28 August 2005 (aged 52); London, UK
- Occupation: Economist
- Spouse: Alice

Paul Andrew Geroski (18 October 1952 – 28 August 2005) was a leading economist in the United Kingdom. Although born in Pleasantville, New York, United States, Geroski studied and spent most of his career in Britain, where he settled permanently in 1975.

== Career ==
Following the completion of a PhD at University of Warwick, he joined the Economics Department at University of Southampton as a lecturer. He quickly established a reputation as an excellent teacher who was generous with his time. Initially, he was given the task of teaching mathematics to 1st year students, many of whom had not studied maths at A level. His 'one-hour revision lecture' on differentiation for those students at the start of the course was supported by hours of help in his office. He was also well known for teaching partial differentiation with the aid of a borrowed motorcycle helmet. He taught 'Economic Problems of Industry' to second-year students. This quickly (in his second year at Southampton) became the most popular optional course run by the department. His good humour, friendliness, willingness to give up his time, and sharp mind all contributed to making his courses popular. Many students chose him to supervise their dissertations for the same reasons.

In 1991, he became a professor of economics at the London Business School, later becoming Dean of its MBA programme (1995–98). The elective course Technology and Competition was amongst the classes he taught. He was a governor of the school from 1999 to 2001.

In 1998, he became a member of the Monopolies and Mergers Commission, which subsequently was superseded by the Competition Commission. He became deputy chairman in 2001 and was its chairman from May 2004 until his death.

His research interests were innovation, technical change, and determinants of corporate performance. Geroski's extensive case studies of R&D and innovation challenged the view that R&D subsidies were justified by positive externalities, or "spillovers". He found that when the parties involved were properly specified, almost all gains were captured by them.

== Contributions ==
Geroski developed the Geroski curve, an economic model that describes the evolution of industries through stages of innovation, competition, and consolidation. The model illustrates how industries often begin with many companies experimenting with different designs, followed by the emergence of a dominant design, which leads to fewer vendors and increased market value for the remaining firms. This framework has been applied to industries such as technology and automotive to explain patterns of market consolidation.

== Books ==
- Geroski, Paul (1985). Oligopoly, competition, and welfare. Oxford, Oxfordshire, UK New York, New York, USA: B. Blackwell. ISBN 9780631144793.
- Geroski, Paul; Jacquemin, Alexis (1990). Barriers to entry and strategic competition. Harwood Academic Publishers. ISBN 9780415846189.
- Geroski, Paul (1991). Market dynamics and entry. Oxford, Oxfordshire, UK Cambridge, Massachusetts, USA: B. Blackwell Publishers. ISBN 9780631155546.
- Geroski, Paul (1994). Market structure, corporate performance, and innovative activity. Oxford Oxford New York: Clarendon Press Oxford University Press. ISBN 9780198288558.
- Geroski, Paul; Gregg, Paul (1997). Coping with recession: UK company performance in adversity. Cambridge, UK New York, USA: Cambridge University Press. ISBN 9780521626019.
- Geroski, Paul (2003). The evolution of new markets. Oxford, Oxfordshire, UK New York, New York, USA: Oxford University Press. ISBN 9780199248896.
- Geroski, Paul; Markides, Constantinos (2005). Fast second: how smart companies bypass radical innovation to enter and dominate new markets. San Francisco, California: Jossey-Bass. ISBN 9780787971540.

== Publications ==
- http://econpapers.repec.org/RAS/pge60.htm
