= Jeremy Heimans =

Australian entrepreneur and political activist

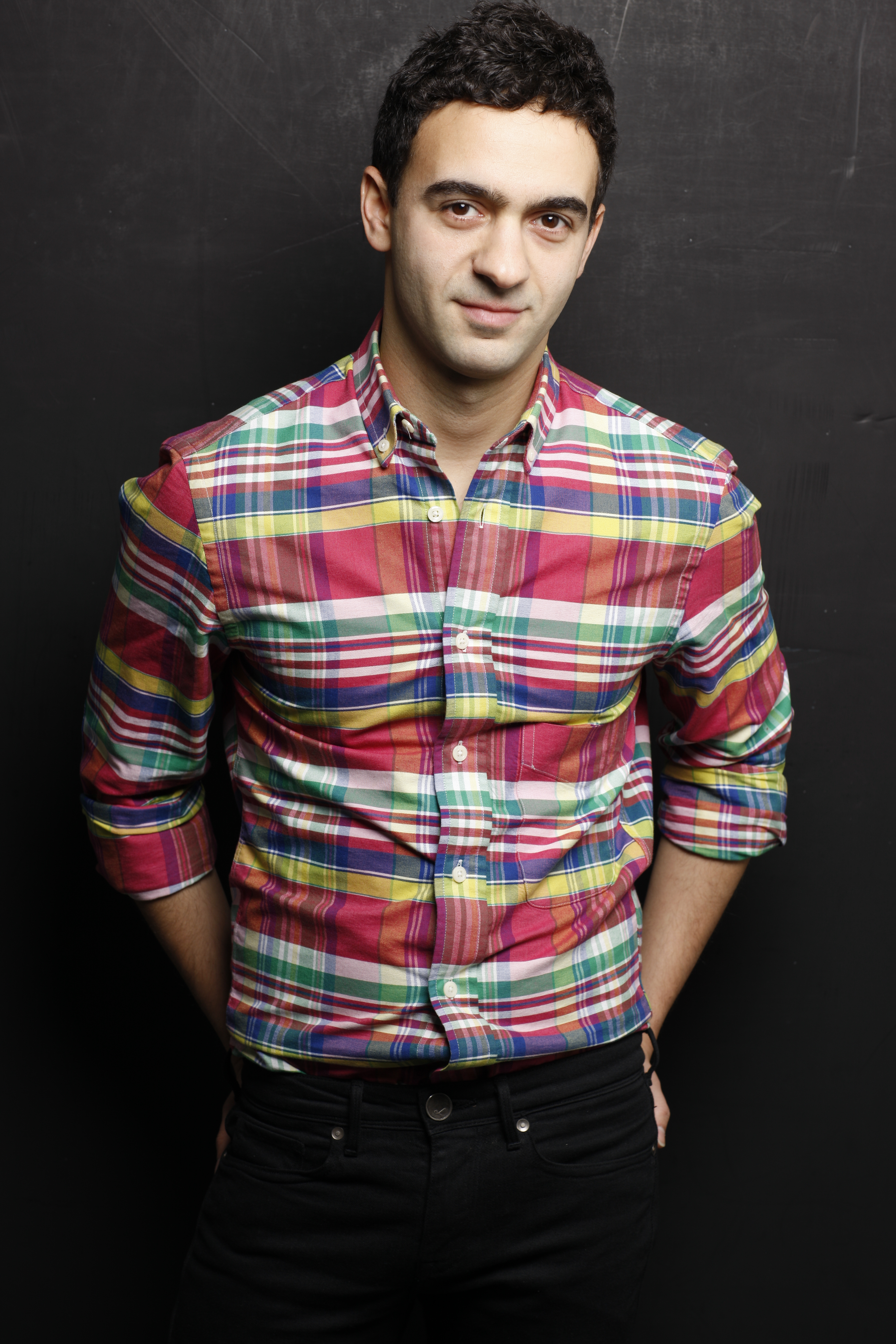
- Occupations: Entrepreneur and political activist

Jeremy Heimans is an Australian entrepreneur and political activist.

== Background ==
Heimans was born in Sydney and is of Dutch descent on his father’s side and of Lebanese descent on his mother’s side. He attended Sydney Boys High School. He studied at the University of Sydney, where he was awarded the University Medal in Government, and the Harvard University John F. Kennedy School of Government.

Heimans, as a child activist in his native Australia, he ran media campaigns and lobbied leaders on issues like children's rights and nuclear non-proliferation. In 2004, Heimans dropped out of Oxford to co-found a campaign group in the U.S. presidential elections that used crowd-funding to help a group of women whose loved ones were in Iraq hire a private jet to follow Vice-President Dick Cheney on his campaign stops, in what became known as the "Chasing Cheney" tour.

== Career ==
Heimans began his career with the strategy consultants McKinsey & Company.

In 2005, Heimans co-founded GetUp, an Australian political organization. In 2007, Heimans was a co-founder of Avaaz.org, a global civic organization that operates in 15 languages and claims over forty million members in 194 countries. In 2003 he was a research associate at the University of Oxford Global Economics Governance Programme, researching multi-actor global funds.

In 2009, Heimans co-founded Purpose, a social impact agency. Purpose has advised institutions like the ACLU, Google, and The Bill and Melinda Gates Foundation. On 12 February 2020 Capgemini announced the signing of an agreement to acquire Purpose. Purpose joined Capgemini as an independently run Public Benefit Corporation.

In 2010, Heimans co-founded All Out with Andre Banks, serving on the board until 2017. He is currently an Emeritus Board member.

Heimans co-wrote the national bestseller New Power: How Power Works in Our Hyperconnected World - and How to Make It Work for You with Henry Timms, published by Penguin Random House in 2018. Heimans and Timms’ thinking on new power has been featured as the Big Idea in Harvard Business Review, as one of CNN’s “ideas to change the world” and Jeremy’s top-rated TED talk on the topic has been viewed 1.5 million times. New Power has been praised by writers and public figures, including Richard Branson, David Brooks, Malcolm Gladwell, Daniel Pink, Susan Cain, Jane Goodall, Alicia Garza, Russell Brand, Reid Hoffman, Ai-jen Poo, Adam Grant, Craig Newmark, Paul Polman, Howard Dean, Anne-Marie Slaughter, and more. David Brooks wrote a feature about New Power in the New York Times, where he described the book as "the best window I've seen into this new world". The Guardian has described New Power as "a manual on how to navigate the 21st century". Stanford Social Innovation Review described New Power as the "road map to a new world". Bloomberg, Fortune, Inc, CNBC and others have named it a best book of the year. It was also shortlisted for the Financial Times and McKinsey Business Book of the Year Award.

Heimans served as chair of the World Economic Forum’s Global Agenda Council on Civic Participation and as a Young Global Leader. In a 2018 profile, The Monthly speculated that he “might be the most influential Australian in the world”. The Guardian has named Heimans to its OUT 100 World Pride Power List of LGBT+ leaders and as one of the 10 most influential voices on sustainability in the US.

== Personal life ==
Heimans is openly gay and lives in New York. He is Jewish Australian and is of Dutch Jewish descent on his father's side and Lebanese Jewish on his mother's side. According to Heimans, much of his activism is due to his father, as his father is/was a Holocaust survivor.

He is the brother of renowned Australian-British painter Ralph Heimans.

== Awards and honors ==
In 2011, Heimans received the Ford Foundation's 75th Anniversary Visionary Award for his work building "powerful, tech-savvy movements that can transform culture and influence policy". In 2012, Fast Company ranked him 11th on their annual list of the 100 Most Creative People in Business. He has also received the Foreign Policy Association Medal and the Performance Theater’s Inspired Leadership Award.
