= Wilful Blindness (2011 book) =

2011 non-fiction book by Margaret Heffernan

Wilful Blindness: Why We Ignore the Obvious at Our Peril
- Author: Margaret Heffernan
- Language: English
- Publisher: Bloomsbury Publishing
- Publication date: March 2011
- Pages: 304
- ISBN: 9780802777959

Wilful Blindness: Why We Ignore the Obvious at Our Peril is a non-fiction book by businesswoman and writer Margaret Heffernan. The book was first published in 2011 by Walker & Company.

== Overview ==
Wilful Blindness delves into the psychology behind why individuals and institutions often choose to ignore or overlook evident, harmful information or truths, even when acknowledging them would lead to better outcomes. Heffernan utilizes real-world examples such as the Enron scandal and the Catholic Church sexual abuse cases.

The book covers a range of fields including psychology, history, neuroscience, and social behavior to explain how institutional and individual failure often results from willful blindness. Heffernan discusses various factors that contribute to this phenomenon, such as cognitive dissonance, obedience to authority, and love and fear.

== Reception ==
The book was a finalist for the Financial Times Best Business Book of the Year in 2011.
