= BBC Box =

Shipping container tracked by the BBC

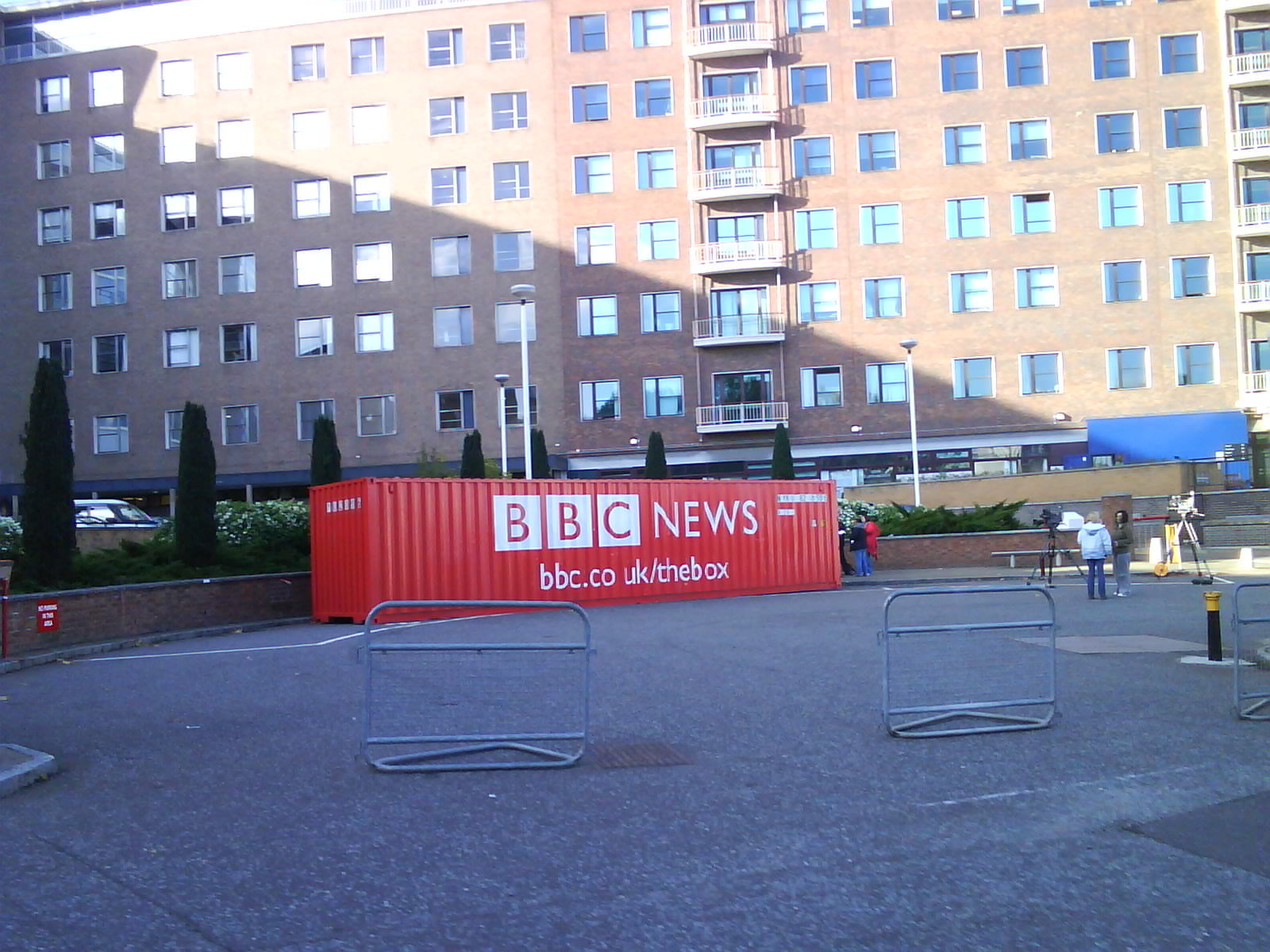
The Box outside BBC Television Centre, London in November 2009.

The Box or BBC Box (BIC code: NYKU8210506) was a single ISO intermodal container which was tracked by BBC News between September 2008 and April 2009, as part of a project to study international trade and globalisation. The Box was fitted with tracking equipment, and painted in a special one-off BBC livery.

The Box was named after the book The Box: How the Shipping Container Made the World Smaller and the World Economy Bigger, which covers the effects of containerisation. The project was assisted by the Container Shipping Information Service.

The tracking project was launched on 8 September 2008. The BBC project tracked a standard 40-foot-long (12.19 m) shipping container as it was transported by its owner, Nippon Yusen Kaisha (NYK) shipping line using intermodal freight transport with various cargoes. An on-board GPS unit tracked the Box's location, and this was used to update a map showing the current location and its previous route. If the container's GPS or communications signal was obstructed (such as having been stacked too far inside the ship's hold), the ship's own GPS location was used to manually update a map. The tracking unit suffered technical problems during December 2008.

Following the end of the project in 2009, the shipping container was donated by its owner, Nippon Yusen Kaisha (NYK) to a charity to be turned into a soup kitchen.

== Cargoes ==
Route; 1: Port of Southampton→ 2: Greenock→ 3: Southampton→ 4: Port of Singapore→ 5: Port of Shanghai→ 6: Port of Los Angeles→ 7: Port of New Jersey→ 8: Santos, Brazil→ 9: Hong Kong→ 10: Port of Yokohama→ 11: Laem Chabang, Thailand→ 12: Southampton
Ports; Destination. Transhipment

The Box arrived empty, already in its BBC branding. It travelled to its first destination to take on its first cargo; a consignment of whisky from a Glasgow-based bottling plant to Shanghai, China. On arrival in Shanghai, the Box was met and reported on by British school pupils on a trip to China.

Empty
From Southampton Maritime, England, to a dry port at Coatbridge, Scotland (by rail, behind Freightliner 66594 NYK Spirit of Kyoto)
to Paisley, Scotland (by road)
Chivas Regal Scotch Whisky
from Paisley via Greenock, Scotland (by road)
via Port of Belfast, Northern Ireland, to Port of Southampton (on board MV Vega Stockholm)
via Suez Canal and Gulf of Aden; reloaded at Port of Singapore, to Port of Shanghai, China (on board MV Copenhagen Express)
Tape measures, cosmetics, and gardening products for Big Lots
from Port of Shanghai via Japan and Pacific Ocean, to Port of Los Angeles, United States (on board MV NYK Starlight);
via New Jersey (by rail)
to Pennsylvania (by road)
Ink, spearmint flavouring, additives, and polyester fibre
from New York, (on board MV Iwato, IMO9106807, formerly Eagle I)
to Santos, Brazil (by sea)
Monosodium glutamate and auto parts
from Santos via Cape of Good Hope and Singapore (on board MV Aquitania, IMO9178288, call sign: A8HJ6)
reloaded at Port of Hong Kong to Port of Yokohama, Japan (on board MV NYK Clara, IMO9355408, call sign: 9VFW9)
Various (consolidated cargo)
from Yokohama 15 August 2009 (on board MV Ratana Thida 230, IMO9117129, call sign: HSAG2)
to Laem Chabang, Thailand (expected: 23 August 2009)
Tinned catfood
from Lat Krabang, Bangkok, Thailand on 25 September 2009, due to arrive at Southampton, United Kingdom on 21 October 2009.

Later arrived in Southampton on 22 October at around 3 am, unloaded with crane L, being driven by Lee Harfield, the same driver who had loaded it when it left Southampton.

GPS tracking stopped on 4 April 2009, shortly after passing Mauritius.

== Similar projects ==
- A 2007 book, Around the World in 40 Feet; Two Hundred Days in the Life of a 40FT NYK Shipping Container, written by Richard Cook and Marcus Oleniuk, detailed the journey of another NYK container.
- Logistics, a 2012 experimental film, follows the production and shipping associated with a pedometer over the course of 35 days; Logistics is considered to be the longest film ever produced.
