= Arthur Ross Book Award =

Literary award

- Awarded for: Literature (politics-related)
- Country: United States
- Presented by: • Arthur Ross (endowment in 2001) • Council on Foreign Relations (administration)
- Reward: Varies
- First award: 2002
- Website: www.cfr.org/arthur-ross-book-award

The Arthur Ross Book Award is a politics-related literary award.

== History and administration ==
It was endowed in 2001 by Arthur Ross, an American businessman and philanthropist, for the purpose of recognizing books that make an outstanding contribution to the understanding of foreign policy or international relations. The prize is for nonfiction works from the past two years, in English or translation, and is accompanied by a monetary award. The amount of the prize has varied from year to year but has sometimes consisted of a $30,000 "Gold Medal", a $15,000 "Silver Medal" and a $7,500 "Honorable Mention".

The award is administered by the Council on Foreign Relations, an American nonprofit nonpartisan membership organization, publisher and think tank specializing in U.S. foreign policy and international affairs.

== List of winners ==
=== 2000s ===
2002

- Gold Medal – Robert Skidelsky for John Maynard Keynes: Fighting for Freedom 1937–1946
- Silver Medal – Lawrence Freedman for Kennedy's Wars: Berlin, Cuba, Laos, and Vietnam
- Honorable Mention – Walter Russell Mead and Richard C. Leone for Special Providence: American Foreign Policy and How It Changed the World

2003

- Gold Medal – Samantha Power for A Problem from Hell: America and the Age of Genocide
- Silver Medal – Margaret MacMillan for Paris 1919: Six Months That Changed the World
- Honorable Mention – Philip Bobbitt for The Shield of Achilles: War, Peace, and the Course of History

2004

- Gold Medal – Daniel Benjamin and Steven Simon for The Age of Sacred Terror: Radical Islam's War Against America
- Silver Medal – Robert Cooper for The Breaking of Nations: Order and Chaos in the Twenty-First Century
- Honorable Mention – Ivo H. Daalder and James M. Lindsay for America Unbound: The Bush Revolution in Foreign Policy

2005

- Gold Medal – Steve Coll for Ghost Wars: The Secret History of the CIA, Afghanistan, and Bin Laden, from the Soviet Invasion to September 10, 2001
- Silver Medal – Stephen Biddle for Military Power: Explaining Victory and Defeat in Modern Battle
- Honorable Mention – James Mann for Rise of the Vulcans: The History of Bush's War Cabinet

2006

- Gold Medal – Tony Judt for Postwar: A History of Europe Since 1945
- Silver Medal – Olivier Roy for Globalized Islam: The Search for a New Ummah
- Honorable Mention – George Packer for The Assassins' Gate: America in Iraq

2007

- Gold Medal – Kwame Anthony Appiah for Cosmopolitanism: Ethics in a World of Strangers
- Silver Medal – Robert L. Beisner for Dean Acheson: A Life in the Cold War
- Honorable Mention – Thomas E. Ricks for Fiasco: The American Military Adventure in Iraq, 2003 to 2005

2008

- Gold Medal – Paul Collier for The Bottom Billion: Why the Poorest Countries Are Failing and What Can Be Done About It
- Silver Medal – Trita Parsi for Treacherous Alliance: The Secret Dealings of Israel, Iran, and the United States
- Honorable Mention – Robert Dallek for Nixon and Kissinger: Partners in Power

2009

- Gold Medal – Philip P. Pan for Out of Mao's Shadow: The Struggle for the Soul of a New China
- Silver Medal – Ahmed Rashid for Descent into Chaos: The United States and the Failure of Nation Building in Pakistan, Afghanistan, and Central Asia
- Honorable Mention – Gareth Evans for The Responsibility To Protect: Ending Mass Atrocity Crimes Once and for All

=== 2010s ===
2010

- Gold Medal – Liaquat Ahamed for Lords of Finance: The Bankers Who Broke the World
- Silver Medal – Seth Jones for In the Graveyard of Empires: America's War in Afghanistan
- Honorable Mention – Gérard Prunier for Africa's World War: Congo, the Rwandan Genocide, and the Making of a Continental Catastrophe

2011

- Gold Medal – Carmen M. Reinhart and Kenneth Rogoff for This Time is Different: Eight Centuries of Financial Folly
- Silver Medal – Thomas Hegghammer for Jihad in Saudi Arabia: Violence and Pan-Islamism since 1979
- Honorable Mention – Charles A. Kupchan for How Enemies Become Friends: The Sources of Stable Peace

2012

- Gold Medal – John Lewis Gaddis for George F. Kennan: An American Life
- Silver Medal – Jason Stearns for Dancing in the Glory of Monsters: The Collapse of the Congo and the Great War of Africa
- Honorable Mention – Daniel Yergin for The Quest: Energy, Security, and the Remaking of the Modern World

2013

- Gold Medal – Fredrik Logevall for Embers of War: The Fall of an Empire and the Making of America's Vietnam
- Silver Medal – Anne Applebaum for Iron Curtain: The Crushing of Eastern Europe, 1944–1956
- Honorable Mention – Daron Acemoglu and James A. Robinson for Why Nations Fail: The Origins of Power, Prosperity, and Poverty

2014

- Gold Medal – Gary J. Bass for The Blood Telegram: Nixon, Kissinger, and a Forgotten Genocide
- Silver Medal – Carter Malkasian for War Comes to Garmser: Thirty Years of Conflict on the Afghan Frontier
- Honorable Mention – Benn Steil for The Battle of Bretton Woods: John Maynard Keynes, Harry Dexter White, and the Making of a New World Order

2015

- Gold Medal – Thomas Piketty for Capital in the Twenty-First Century
- Silver Medal – Stephen Kotkin for Stalin: Paradoxes of Power, 1878–1928
- Honorable Mention – Evan Osnos for Age of Ambition: Chasing Fortune, Truth, and Faith in the New China

2016

- Gold Medal – Niall Ferguson for Kissinger: 1923–1968: The Idealist
- Silver Medal – Thomas J. Christensen for The China Challenge: Shaping the Choices of a Rising Power
- Bronze Medal – Charles Moore for Margaret Thatcher: The Authorized Biography—Volume II: Everything She Wants

2017

- Gold Medal – John Pomfret for The Beautiful Country and the Middle Kingdom: America and China, 1776 to the Present
- Silver Medal – Robert F. Worth for A Rage for Order: The Middle East in Turmoil, From Tahrir Square to ISIS
- Bronze Medal – Svetlana Alexievich for Secondhand Time: The Last of the Soviets

2018

- Gold Medal – Stephen Kotkin for Stalin: Waiting for Hitler, 1929–1941
- Silver Medal – Michael Green for By More Than Providence: Grand Strategy and American Power in the Asia Pacific Since 1783
- Bronze Medal – Masha Gessen for The Future Is History: How Totalitarianism Reclaimed Russia

2019

- Gold Medal – Jill Lepore for These Truths: A History of the United States
- Silver Medal – Andrew Roberts for Churchill: Walking with Destiny
- Bronze Medal – Max Hastings for Vietnam: An Epic Tragedy, 1945–1975

2020

- Gold Medal – Patrick Radden Keefe for Say Nothing: A True Story of Murder and Memory in Northern Ireland
- Silver Medal – George Packer for Our Man: Richard Holbrooke and the End of the American Century
- Bronze Medal – William Dalrymple for The Anarchy: The East India Company, Corporate Violence, and the Pillage of an Empire

2021

- Gold Medal – Zachary D. Carter for The Price of Peace: Money, Democracy, and the Life of John Maynard Keynes
- Silver Medal – Peter Baker and Susan Glasser for The Man Who Ran Washington: The Life and Times of James A. Baker III
- Bronze Medal – Robert Putnam and Shaylyn Romney Garrett for The Upswing: How America Came Together a Century Ago and How We Can Do It Again

2022

- Gold Medal – Carter Malkasian for The American War in Afghanistan: A History
- Silver Medal – Mary Elise Sarotte for Not One Inch: America, Russia, and the Making of a Post-Cold War Stalemate
- Bronze Medal – Nicole Perlroth for This Is How They Tell Me the World Ends: The Cyberweapons Arms Race 7

2023

- Gold Medal – Christopher R. Miller for Chip War: The Fight for the World’s Most Critical Technology
- Silver Medal – Susan Shirk for Overreach: How China Derailed Its Peaceful Rise
- Bronze Medal – Sergei Guriev and Daniel Treisman for Spin Dictators: The Changing Face of Tyranny in the 21st Century

2024

- Gold Medal – Gary J. Bass for Judgment at Tokyo: World War II on Trial and the Making of Modern Asia
- Silver Medal – Kal Raustiala for The Absolutely Indispensable Man: Ralph Bunche, The United Nations, and the Fight to End Empire
- Bronze Medal – Henry Farrell and Abraham L. Newman for Underground Empire: How America Weaponized the World Economy

2025

- Gold Medal – Steve Coll for The Achilles Trap: Saddam Hussein, the CIA, and the Origins of America’s Invasion of Iraq
- Silver Medal – Jonathan Blitzer for Everyone Who Is Gone Is Here: The United States, Central America, and the Making of a Crisis
- Bronze Medal – Sergey Radchenko for To Run the World: The Kremlin’s Cold War Bid for Global Power

== See also ==
- List of literary awards
- List of politics awards
