= A Region in Turmoil =

South Asian conflicts book article

A Region in Turmoil: South Asian Conflicts since 1947
- Book cover
- Author: Rob Johnson
- Series: Contemporary Worlds
- Subject: History of South Asia, Insurgency, Postcolonialism, Military history
- Genre: Nonfiction
- Set in: South Asia
- Publisher: Reaktion Books, and University of Chicago Press
- Publication date: 2005
- Publication place: England
- Media type: Print, E-Book
- Pages: 268
- ISBN: 1861892578 and 9781861892577
- OCLC: 59356415
- LC Class: DS341 .J64 2006
- Website: Official website

A Region in Turmoil: South Asian Conflicts since 1947 is a scholarly nonfiction book written by Rob Johnson and published by Reaktion Books, London, in 2005.

== Synopsis ==
John H. Gill, reviewing the book for The Journal of Military History, defines the region of South Asia as encompassing a territory that extends from Afghanistan to Bangladesh. He says the author also includes Burma (present day Myanmar) to enable discussion of border concerns it has with India. Gill also says, the author further elaborates on other issues pertaining to this smaller region. Gill additionally observes that the author maintains an objective, but not sterile narration.

The book overviews the numerous conflicts that have occurred in the region since the British withdrawal after World War II. In doing so, this overview outlines the interconnections between the forms of volatile conflicts; the roots of the tensions and disputes, including religion, ethnic tension, ideology, and historical experiences; while also connecting the results. This method allows the author to portray the diverse settings for violent behavior in this southern region. This approach illuminates the complex interrelations that are involved.

Thus, this book is a comparative study of the parallels drawn from the variety of conflicts occurring since 1947. These conflicts share a common methodology including "armed confrontations, insurrections, communal riots, insurgencies, acts of terrorism, and wars." The nations involved are: India, Pakistan, Afghanistan, Bangladesh, Sri Lanka, Nepal, and Myanmar. Also, global influences impact this region in the form of "conflicts, insurgency, terror, and peace making." Such influences also result in diasporas but the effects of nationalism from abroad are not covered.

== Reception ==
R.D. Long writing for Choice says, "Johnson has provided a sophisticated and informative analysis. Summing Up: Highly recommended." However, John H. Gill, of The Journal of Military History, among other criticisms says "...the narrative traverses the broad features of South Asia's political-diplomatic and military history rather erratically without giving sufficient focus to the themes raised in the introduction." He also says the book introduces errors in some of the events it covers.

== Chapters ==
Below are the titles of the book chapters:

1. The significance of conflicts in South Asia
2. Conflicts in India
3. Conflicts in Pakistan, Bangladesh, Sri Lanka, Nepal and Myanmar
4. Global influences on South Asian conflicts
5. The Kashmir dispute, 1947–2004
6. The India-China conflict of 1962
7. The India-Pakistan wars of 1965 and 1971, and the Bangladesh war of independence
8. Afghanistan : the Soviet occupation, 1979–89
9. Afghanistan : the Civil War, 1989–2001
10. Insurgency, terror and peace-making
11. Conclusion : points of conflict in South Asia

== See also ==
- The American War in Afghanistan: A History (2021 Oxford University Press, 2021) by Carter Malkasian.
- Taliban: Militant Islam, Oil and Fundamentalism in Central Asia (Yale University Press, 2000), by Ahmed Rashid.
- Sumit Ganguly Professor of Political Science at Indiana University.
- Partition of India
