= I.B. Tauris =

British educational publishing house

- Parent company: Bloomsbury Publishing
- Status: Active
- Founded: 1983; 43 years ago
- Founder: Iradj Bagherzade
- Country of origin: United Kingdom
- Headquarters location: London
- Distribution: Macmillan Publishers Services (UK); Baker & Taylor (US)
- Nonfiction topics: Art, Biography, Environmental studies, Geography, History, International relations, Middle East, Philosophy, Politics, Religious studies, Travel, Visual culture
- Imprints: Tauris Parke Paperbacks; Tauris Academic Studies; Philip Wilson Publishers
- Official website: ibtauris.com

I.B. Tauris is an educational publishing house and imprint of Bloomsbury Publishing. It was an independent publishing house with offices in London and New York City until its purchase in May 2018 by Bloomsbury Publishing.

It specialises in non-fiction books on Asian studies, the history of art, history of the Middle Ages and the modern period, politics and international relations, the Middle East and Islamic world generally, religious studies, geography and environment, and visual culture (including film, photography, and contemporary art). Its books are aimed primarily at the specialist market, including academics and students of higher education. The company also sells to a general audience.

== History ==
I.B. Tauris was founded in 1983 by Iradj Bagherzade. Its declared strategy was to fill a perceived gap between trade publishing houses and university presses, to publish serious but accessible works on international politics and culture. The company specialised in its early days on publishing on the Middle East. In 2002, it published approximately 160 books per year.

In the period following the September 11 attacks, 2001, its publication Taliban by Ahmed Rashid is reported to have sold nearly 500,000 copies in English worldwide with 27 licensed editions internationally.

In May 2011, the company acquired the fine arts publisher Philip Wilson Publishers after handling its sales, marketing, and distribution for several years.

In June 2013, the company announced an agreement with the American University in Cairo Press (AUCP), under which I.B. Tauris distributes all AUCP publications worldwide, outside North America and Egypt. The two publishing houses also embarked on a series of international co-publications. This move was reportedly in line with an I.B. Tauris strategy to be the dominant player in international Middle East Studies publishing.

In 2018, I.B. Tauris was acquired by Bloomsbury Publishing, and has become an imprint of the publishing house.
