= Terror and Consent =

2008 book by Philip Bobbitt

Terror and Consent: The Wars for the Twenty-First Century
- Author: Philip Bobbitt
- Language: English
- Genre: Social Sciences
- Publisher: Alfred A. Knopf
- Publication date: 2008
- Publication place: United States
- Media type: Print (Hardback)
- Pages: 676
- ISBN: 978-1-4000-4243-2

Terror and Consent: The Wars for the Twenty-First Century is a work by Philip Bobbitt that calls for a reconceptualization of what he calls "the Wars on Terror." First published in 2008 by Alfred A. Knopf in the U.S. and by the Allen Lane imprint of Penguin in the U.K., Terror and Consent takes as its foundation Bobbitt's grand historical theory of the co-evolution of the state and warfare which he developed in The Shield of Achilles: War, Peace, and the Course of History. The book consists of an introduction, three parts, and a conclusion.

Bobbitt argues most ideas about 21st-century terrorism are mistaken, and that "the wars against terror" comprise efforts against three dangers that threaten the legitimacy of the State: 1) "global, networked terrorists"; 2) "the proliferation of weapons of mass destruction"; and 3) catastrophes natural and "nonnatural." As a historian, Bobbitt understands the contemporary problem of terrorism as part of "the transition from nation states to market states." According to an argument he developed at length in The Shield of Achilles, the principle of legitimacy of the market state is "maximization of opportunities for ... civil society and citizens." It follows that protection of citizens is “the strategic raison d’être of the market state." But despite limited successes, Bobbitt does not believe that the West is winning "the Wars against Terror," in part because of a failure to rethink the relationship of strategy to law, two concepts that, in Bobbitt's view, can no longer be analyzed separately.

The book's title derives from two new concepts he develops: States of terror and states of consent. Bobbitt argues that states are increasingly interdependent: "Realism, it seems, is increasingly unrealistic."

== Reception ==
Reviewers have emphasized the sweep and originality of Bobbitt's thinking. Niall Ferguson, in the New York Times Book Review, called Terror and Consent "a manifesto for a new Atlanticism" and "a reinvention of the dominant role of the trans-Atlantic alliance." Conor Gearty found behind its "beguiling cosmopolitanism" traces of American exceptionalism: "many will balk at the assertion that the 'reason why the United States is not itself a terrorist state even though its warfare brings suffering and destruction to many innocent persons, including civilians, is that it acts within the law.'" Rebecca Seal called Terror and Consent "fascinating" and "extraordinary," and described the book as "a wide-ranging, frequently controversial and always opinionated treatise." Kenneth Anderson called it "enormous in concept and sweep," and praised its "remarkably rich strategic vision of how concretely to make war against terror, terrorists and violent jihad."

More critically, the influential establishment journal Foreign Affairs warned that "Some readers will find the notion of a market state more of a caricature than a useful archetype, and scholars of international relations will wish that the book more systematically explored the implications of growing security interdependence for international cooperation."

David Cameron, then Leader of the Opposition in the United Kingdom, put the book on his 2008 summer reading list for Conservative MPs.
