= United States war in Afghanistan =

- United States invasion of Afghanistan
- War in Afghanistan (2001–2021)
- The American War in Afghanistan: A History is about a book written by Carter Malkasian.
