= The War That Doesn't Say Its Name =

2022 book

The War That Doesn't Say Its Name: The Unending Conflict in the Congo
- Author: Jason Stearns
- Language: English
- Publisher: Princeton University Press
- Publication date: February 2022
- ISBN: 978-0691224527
- OCLC: 1245956209

The War That Doesn't Say Its Name: The Unending Conflict in the Congo is a book by Jason Stearns, published by the Princeton University Press in 2022. It covers the violence and conflicts in the Democratic Republic of the Congo, focusing in particular on events after the Pretoria Accord.

== Background ==
Jason Stearns is an American writer who worked for over twenty years in the Democratic Republic of the Congo, including on the United Nations Group of Experts on the Democratic Republic of the Congo(DRC). As research for the book, Stearns used 300 different interviews as well as United Nations reports on the conflict and their peacekeeping missions. The War That Doesn't Say Its Name is Stearns's second book about the conflicts in the DRC, having previously published Dancing in the Glory of Monsters: The Collapse of the Congo and the Great War of Africa in 2011.

== Content ==
The War That Doesn't Say Its Name is divided into nine chapters, each of which focuses on a different aspect of the DRC, the conflicts, or the numerous peacekeeping attempts conducted by the United Nations from 2003 through the 2010s.

== Reception ==
Reviews for the book were positive overall, with critics appreciating the way that Stearns provided motivations and reasons to explain the continued violence in the Democratic Republic of the Congo in the 21st century. A review in The Washington Post contrasted Stearn's explanations of local conflicts to the mainstream depictions of the violence as "without motivation or cause". Jacqui Cho, in International Peacekeeping, praised the Stearns's "respectful treatment of local parlance" and said the book "foregrounds Congolese...perceptions of the war". Ben Shepherd, in International Affairs, described the book as "essential reading for those interested in the DRC, Rwanda and other conflict zones".

The book was included a 2022 The Washington Post "African Politics Summer Reading Spectacular" list.
