= Russian opposition to NATO enlargement =

Russian opposition to NATO enlargement relates to the aftermath of the Revolutions of 1989, when the fall of Soviet-allied communist states to opposition parties brought the Soviet spheres of influence into end. Russian authorities claim that agreement on non-enlargement of NATO to Eastern Europe took place orally and the alliance violated it with its enlargement, while the leaders of the alliance claim that no such promise was made and that such a decision could only be made in writing. Soviet president Mikhail Gorbachev, who participated in the 1990 negotiations, spoke out in a 2008 interview about a verbal commitment by then U.S. Secretary of State James Baker to not move NATO "one inch eastward", but later made clear there was "no promise regarding broader enlargement." Among academic researchers, opinions on the existence or absence of a non-enlargement agreement also differ, although the consensus remains Russian claims of such a guarantee are loosely interpreted and historical revisionism.

NATO added 16 new member states since the dissolution of the Soviet Union

An active discussion related to this issue unfolded in Russia and in the world against the background of the Russian proposals on international security at the end of 2021 and the aggravation of the situation around the 2022 Russian invasion of Ukraine. The position of Russia in such circumstances is that the question of the existence of an agreement on the non-enlargement of NATO in the eastern direction should be considered in the context of relations between Russia and NATO and Russia and the United States, since it determines the likelihood of a potentially possible entry of Ukraine into NATO, which Russia's leadership considers a threat. The NATO leadership points out that the decision to limit the enlargement of NATO has never been taken, and its adoption would entail a change in the fundamental documents of the alliance, and the support of Ukraine by NATO cannot pose a threat to Russia.

The last countries bordering Russia to join NATO before the beginning of the Russo-Ukrainian War in February 2014 were the three former Soviet Baltic States, which joined on 29 March 2004. Following the Russian invasion of Ukraine, which began in February 2022, Finland joined NATO in April 2023 and Sweden in March 2024. Russia also opposes the potential NATO membership of Ukraine, Georgia, Armenia, Moldova and Serbia.

== Historical context ==
The proposal not to expand NATO eastward, which was one of the ways Western countries took the initiative on the issue of German reunification and reducing the possibility of the Soviet Union's influence on this process, started with a speech by German Foreign Minister Hans-Dietrich Genscher in Tutzing, on January 31, 1990, in which he included a call for NATO to clearly state: "whatever happens in the Warsaw Pact, there will be no expansion of NATO territory to the east, that is, closer to the borders of the Soviet Union." Genscher prepared his speech independently of German Chancellor Helmut Kohl, to whom he was a political competitor and a rival to the status of "father of unity", but his proposal matched interest among the leadership of other Western countries in the possibility of obtaining the consent of the USSR to the unification of Germany in exchange for limiting the expansion of NATO. Genscher outlined his plan to US secretary of state James Baker in Washington, D.C. on February 2 and said at a press conference with Baker: "What I said is there is no intention [by NATO] to extend to the East." He also outlined his plan to British foreign minister Douglas Hurd on February 6. Genscher explained that the proposed restriction would be applicable to both the German Democratic Republic (GDR or East Germany) and Eastern European countries. Ten days after his speech in Tutzing, Genscher repeated his words in an interview with Soviet foreign minister Eduard Shevardnadze: "[...] NATO membership for a unified Germany raises complicated questions. For us, however, one thing is certain: NATO will not expand to the east."

The US–West German position became the basis for negotiations with the USSR in Moscow on February 7–10, 1990, which became key in the dispute years later over the existence of an agreement. During these negotiations, representatives of the US and West Germany repeatedly linked the unification of Germany with the limitation of NATO expansion. On February 9, 1990, at a meeting with Shevardnadze, Baker said that the US favoured a united Germany remaining "firmly anchored" in NATO, with which there would have to be "iron-clad guarantees that NATO's jurisdiction or forces would not move eastward." Later that day, at a meeting with Soviet President Mikhail Gorbachev, he acknowledged that "not only for the Soviet Union but for other European countries as well it is important to have guarantees that if the United States keeps its presence in Germany within the framework of NATO, not an inch of NATO’s present military jurisdiction will spread in an eastern direction", and he asked Gorbachev whether he would prefer a united Germany "outside of NATO that is independent and has no US forces or [...] a united Germany with ties to NATO and assurances that there would be no extension of NATO's current jurisdiction eastward." When Gorbachev replied that "a broadening of the NATO zone is not acceptable," Baker agreed. Gorbachev said that Baker's approach was "very realistic[,] so let's think about" it. Baker made the suggested trade-off public at a press conference that day, saying that the US proposed, in order to mitigate the concerns of "those of the East of Germany", that there should be no expansion of NATO forces eastward, and that the unification of Germany is unlikely without "some sort of security guarantees" with regard to the advance of NATO forces or its operation to the east. In its February 13 press release sent to embassies, the US State Department said that "the Secretary [of State] made clear that the U.S. [...] supported a unified Germany within NATO, but that we were prepared to ensure that NATO's military presence would not extend further eastward." On February 9, 1990, Robert Gates, Deputy National Security Advisor to the US President, suggested "the Kohl/Genscher idea" (a united Germany "belonging to NATO" but provided that "NATO troops would move no further east than they now were") to the head of the Soviet KGB, Vladimir Kryuchkov, saying the US thought it "a sound proposal".

Meanwhile, while Baker and Gates were discussing non-expansion with the Soviet leadership, the idea was being questioned by the American leadership, as it appeared to leave east Germany outside NATO's security guarantees. On February 9, US president George H. W. Bush sent a letter to Kohl saying that he wanted east Germany to have a "special military status" within a united Germany that was member of NATO. However, in negotiations between the Soviet and West German leaderships on February 10, 1990, Kohl followed the softer statement from Baker's conversation with Gorbachev and the non-expansion of the NATO zone over Bush's idea, in an effort to get the USSR's consent to the unification of Germany, and assured Gorbachev about the non-expansion of NATO. Kohl told Gorbachev that NATO should not expand its sphere of activity, and Genscher assured Shevardnadze that "NATO membership for a unified Germany raises complicated questions. For us, however, one thing is certain: NATO will not expand to the east. [...] As far as the non-expansion of NATO is concerned, this also applies in general." (Note: Genscher's mention of the "general" echoes his similar statement to Hurd, but he did not make it explicit to Shevardnadze that this implied Eastern Europe.) After these assurances, Gorbachev gave the go-ahead for the creation of a monetary union of the GDR and the FRG, the first step towards the unification of Germany. And on February 12, 1990, at a conference in Ottawa, Baker assured Shevardnadze that "if U[nited] G[ermany] stays in NATO, we should take care about nonexpansion of its jurisdiction to the East", according to the diary of Shevardnadze's assistant, journalist Teymuraz Mamaladze, and the next day the Soviet leadership agreed to proposals for "2+4" (the two German republics and the Four Powers) negotiations on resolving security issues in connection with unification.

At Camp David on February 24–25, the leaders of the US and Germany agreed on a position to propose to the Soviets: east Germany would be granted "special military status", the whole of Germany would be a member of NATO and fall under the collective security guarantees of the bloc, and the alliance would have "jurisdiction" over east Germany even if NATO military structures did not extend there.

In this regard, some scholars consider that during February 1990 there was a significant change of position, which nullified the offer of NATO non-expansion, removing the opportunity for the Soviets to accept it. On the other hand, it is argued that the Soviet leadership had cause to consider the early assurances to still stand.

During a meeting on May 31, 1990, Gorbachev directly supported the wording of the joint public statement proposed by Bush: "The United States is unequivocally in favor of united Germany's membership in NATO, however, if it makes a different choice, we would not contest it, we will respect it."

Between the nomination of the "special status" in spring 1990 and the signing of the settlement agreement in autumn, Western leaders sought to reassure the USSR: the calculation was that they would approve Germany's unification and NATO membership if there were "sufficient sweeteners" about collective security and "appropriate assurances" regarding Soviet security needs. The Americans told them that the unification of Germany, "transformation" of NATO (shifting its emphasis from a military role to a political one) and strengthening of the role of the CSCE "would not yield winners and losers", but "would produce a new legitimate European structure [...] that would be inclusive", that US policy was not aimed at obtaining a "unilateral advantage", nor the separation of Eastern Europe from the Soviet Union, and that the US wanted the USSR to be "integrated [...] into the new Europe". Similar themes were part of the "London Declaration on a Transformed North Atlantic Alliance" adopted in July 1990. These assurances from the US and NATO found favour with the Soviet leadership, which in mid-July 1990 approved the unification of Germany on the basis of the special military status of east Germany, in which NATO security guarantees would apply to east Germany, but non-German NATO troops would not enter it. An addendum to the Treaty on the Final Settlement with Respect to Germany allowed foreign NATO troops to cross the Cold War line at the discretion of the government of a united Germany. Robert Zoellick explained afterward, “we needed to secure that possibility because, if Poland were eventually to join NATO in a second step, we wanted American forces to be able to cross East Germany on their way to be stationed in Poland.” The treaty was signed on 12 September.

In 2022, a 1997 video clip of then-Senator Joe Biden circulated on social media, in which he said although he did not expect a military response, a hostile Russian response was a consideration against admitting the Baltic states (which border Russia). In the remainder of his speech, Biden expressed optimism that Russia would eventually become comfortable with the expansion. The Baltic states joined NATO seven years later.

On 13 November 2026, the German newspaper Bild reported that Russian negotiators in Abu Dhabi had demanded Finland's withdrawal from NATO and the prohibition of NATO military bases in the Baltic states as conditions for ending the war in Ukraine. Kremlin spokesperson Dmitry Peskov denied that Russia had demanded Finland's withdrawal.

== Potential Russian membership ==
In 2000, Russian President Vladimir Putin floated the idea of Russia potentially joining NATO. However these prospects went nowhere, and Putin began developing anti-NATO sentiment and espousing hostile views towards NATO from the early 2000s. In 2009, Russian envoy Dmitry Rogozin did not rule out joining NATO at some point, but stated that Russia was currently more interested in leading a coalition as a great power.

== Strength and status of assurances ==
The main question regarding the February 1990 Western statements about non-expansion of NATO to the east is whether they were promises or assurances. Those who say they were not assurances view them as a diplomatic maneuver to probe the position of the Soviet leadership and "to help them over the hurdle" to accept a unified Germany being a member of NATO, rather than promises. In this view, it is emphasized that the Soviet Union did not receive any written guarantee about the non-expansion of NATO, it is argued that the United States and Germany only "briefly implied" that such could be open for negotiation, that "if there are no legal promises about the future membership and size of NATO, then there is nothing that could be considered as 'violated'", and the main emphasis is on the Treaty on the Final Settlement, which contains no rules concerning territories outside Germany.

Proponents of assertions about the existence of an agreement, in turn, write that informal agreements are important in world politics. Joshua Shifrinson writes that analysts have long understood that states do not need formal agreements when determining expectations of future political actions, and also refers to the statements of US Secretary of State John Kerry, who recognized that even "legally non-binding" agreements constitute a necessary tool of international politics and the practice of the Cold War, when informal agreements between the USSR and the US defined the contours of the European security system (1950s and 1960s), and during the Cuban Missile Crisis of 1962, they played a significant role in preventing a nuclear war between the USSR and the United States. Gorbachev, in an interview with Rossiyskaya Gazeta and its foreign appendices, claiming that "the question of "NATO expansion" was not discussed at all in those years and did not arise" (see also below), at the same time called NATO expansion to the east "a violation of the spirit of those statements and assurances that were given to us in 1990".

Statements regarding the non-proliferation of NATO to the east were also made to Russian president Boris Yeltsin. On October 22, 1993, new US secretary of state Warren Christopher told the president about the NATO Partnership for Peace program, designed for military cooperation with non-alliance states. Yeltsin, based on Christopher's words, considered that NATO had abandoned plans to expand to the east and decided to include all the countries of Eastern Europe and the CIS in the program, rather than include only some of them. Christopher later claimed that Yeltsin misunderstood him and the partnership did not exclude further accession at all, however, some American experts, based on the transcript of the meeting, believe that the secretary of state deliberately misled Yeltsin by mentioning possible membership only briefly and at the end of the conversation.

== Guarantor of agreements ==
In connection with the question of the existence of an agreement, the problem of the entity that had the right to give guarantees on behalf of NATO is also raised. The leadership of the alliance itself in its statements emphasizes that such a decision could only be made by consensus of all the member countries of the bloc (that is, not in the form of a "sole guarantee" of anyone). Mary Elise Sarotte writes that the Soviet leadership "may be forgiven" for thinking that the United States and West Germany had such influence in the alliance, confirmed by documentary evidence, that they could speak for it. It was a "reasonable assumption" for Gorbachev to believe that if a trusted US representative made statements about the future of NATO, repeated soon after by the head of West German, then the statements carry weight. Noting that the decisions of the United States, the USSR, and West Germany on the future of the alliance would require the consent of the alliance itself, she writes at the same time that "in the political climate of 1990 it would have been possible to secure it." Shifrinson is of the opinion that taking into account "the United States' dominance within NATO and its outsized influence on the issue of German reunification in 1990," understanding the American political line of that time is key in the question of the existence of agreements on non-expansion of NATO.

== Scope of guarantees ==
Another controversial issue is the scope of the alleged guarantees: whether the assurances made in February 1990 referred only to the GDR (East Germany) or also to Eastern Europe. Supporters of the agreement claim, referring to the explanations of Genscher's ideas about non-expansion given to Western diplomats, as well as to the "usual meaning" of the concept of the Eastern direction, consider the assurances of non-expansion as concerning Eastern Europe, while their opponents consider the issue of the "eastern direction" exclusively within the framework of what was said directly at the Soviet–Western negotiations, which, according to them, concerned only East Germany and did not affect the fate of Eastern European countries. Gorbachev and Shevardnadze also claimed that the question of NATO's expansion into Eastern Europe "was not discussed at all in those years and did not arise", since the Warsaw Pact still existed. As Belgian political scientist Tom Sauer has said, the argument that NATO expansion to other countries was not considered at that time does not stand up to criticism: Hungary had already raised the issue of expansion in February 1990, and a few weeks later the issue was considered by the US State Department. Genscher himself, on February 6, 1990, told Douglas Hurd: "when I talked about not wanting to extend NATO, that applied to other states besides the GDR."

A similar question is raised in connection with the statement made by NATO Secretary General Manfred Wörner on May 17, 1990, that "the very fact that we are ready not to deploy NATO troops outside the territory of Germany gives the Soviet Union firm security guarantees": the Russian authorities refer to it as a guarantee of non-expansion of NATO beyond Germany, while opponents of such a interpretations write that the statement was made in the context of discussing the deployment of troops on the territory of the GDR, and not countries outside it.

According to representatives of NATO and the US, the issue of restrictions on the accession of Eastern European countries to NATO could not be raised in principle because this restriction would contradict the "right to freely determine their own security" (recognized by the Final Act of the CSCE of 1975, as well as the "underlying" Treaty on the Final Settlement with Respect to Germany and confirmed by a number of subsequent acts signed, among others, by representatives of the USSR and Russia – in particular, the Paris Charter of 1990, the declaration of the Budapest OSCE Summit of 1994 and some others). As US representatives stated in 1996, the USSR's right to discuss and establish "security parameters" in connection with the unification of Germany, "essentially limiting its sovereignty," stemmed from the supreme rights of the four victorious powers (USSR, USA, Great Britain, and France) established following the Second World War in relation to Germany and "it has not set a precedent for Russian surveillance of other Central and Eastern European states."

== Opposition to expansion on political grounds ==
Beyond the debate over diplomatic assurances, numerous policymakers opposed NATO enlargement on strategic grounds, arguing the alliance itself was an unsuitable framework for integrating Eastern Europe. In 1997, George F. Kennan (the architect of Cold War containment) deplored enlargement as "the most fateful error of American policy in the entire post-Cold War era," warning it would inflame Russian nationalism, empower hardliners, and inevitably precipitate conflict along Russia's borders. His assessment was echoed by scholar John Mearsheimer, who predicted NATO's creep eastward would trigger great-power confrontation by violating Russia's legitimate sphere of influence. A bipartisan group of more than 50 experts amplified these concerns in a 1997 open letter. They argued that incorporating Central European states with "serious border and national minority problems" would dilute NATO's core mission, strain decision-making processes, and entangle the alliance in territorial disputes unrelated to transatlantic security. The letter further cautioned that new members' "unevenly developed systems of government" could undermine democratic cohesion and provoke internal crises.

Beyond practical concerns, broader ideological critiques emerged from scholars and peace activists who condemned NATO as fundamentally incompatible with peaceful internationalism. Economist and world-systems theorist Samir Amin described NATO as the military arm of "collective imperialism" formed by a triad of the United States, Europe, and Japan. As such it would not be a defense alliance as its PR strategy claims it is but rather a pact that enforces a "global apartheid system" maintaining core capitalist dominance through mechanisms of unequal exchange. He argued this system perpetuated polarization by securing the "five monopolies" (military, financial, technological, resource, and media control) for the imperial core while subjugating peripheral nations. NATO's interventions, such as those in Yugoslavia, Afghanistan, or Libya, were characterized not as defensive actions but as coercive operations to dismantle sovereign states resisting neoliberal restructuring. According to Amin, the alliance systematically suppressed movements challenging capitalist hierarchy, functioning to secure conditions for transnational oligarchic capital through "permanent war" doctrines. This analysis anticipated NATO's post-2022 evolution into what scholars term "hyper-imperialism", an intensified phase leveraging military coercion to offset declining economic hegemony. Noam Chomsky characterized the alliance as having transformed into "an offensive force, operating out of area, serving US global interests" that subordinated Eastern European states to American geopolitical priorities. Tariq Ali similarly criticized Eastern European elites for embracing what he termed "an imperial gendarmerie" that entangled new members in US-led military interventions unrelated to their core security needs. Johan Galtung lamented the lost opportunity for Eastern Europe to become "a bridge between East and West," arguing NATO membership instead locked the region into confrontational geopolitics. Cynthia Enloe added feminist perspectives, contending NATO reinforced militarized masculinity while suppressing democratic responsiveness to civilian priorities. Historian David N. Gibbs described NATO as enabling illegal wars violating the UN Charter, while journalist Katrina van den Heuvel concluded expansion "institutionalized a divide" in Europe that eliminated independent foreign policy options for new members.

== See also ==
- NATO open door policy
- Not One Inch: America, Russia, and the Making of Post-Cold War Stalemate
- Second Cold War
- Treaty on the Final Settlement with Respect to Germany

== Bibliography ==
- Kramer, Mark (2009). "The myth of a no-NATO-enlargement pledge to Russia" (PDF). Washington Quarterly. 32 (2): 39–61. doi:10.1080/01636600902773248.
- Sarotte, Mary Elise (2014). "A Broken Promise?: What the West Really Told Moscow About NATO Expansion". Foreign Affairs. Vol. 93, no. 5. pp. 90–97.
- Sarotte, Mary Elise (2021). Not One Inch: America, Russia, and the Making of Post-Cold War Stalemate. Yale University Press. ISBN 978-0-300-25993-3.
- Shifrinson, Joshua R. Itzkowitz (Spring 2016). "Deal or No Deal? The End of the Cold War and the U.S. Offer to Limit NATO Expansion". International Security. 40 (4). Belfer Center for Science and International Affairs: 7–44. doi:10.1162/ISEC_a_00236. Archived from the original on 27 January 2024.
- Spohr, Kristina (2012). "Precluded or Precedent-Setting? The 'NATO Enlargement Question' in the Triangular Bonn-Washington-Moscow Diplomacy of 1990–1991". Journal of Cold War Studies. 14 (4): 4–54. doi:10.1162/JCWS_a_00275. S2CID 57564253.
