= Shield of Achilles (disambiguation) =

The Shield of Achilles is a mythological shield described in Homer's Iliad.

Shield of Achilles may also refer to:

- The Shield of Achilles, a poem and collection of poems by W. H. Auden
- The Shield of Achilles: War, Peace, and the Course of History, a book by Philip Bobbitt
- The Achilles Shield system, a 2026 project between Greece and Israel
