= These Truths =

2018 book by Jill Lepore

- Author: Jill Lepore
- Subject: American history
- Published: September 18, 2018 (W. W. Norton)
- Pages: 960 pp.
- ISBN: 978-0-393-63524-9

These Truths: A History of the United States is a one-volume book of American history written by historian and New Yorker writer Jill Lepore. It traces American politics, law, journalism, and technology from the Age of Discovery through the present day, focusing on America's founding truths and their role in uniting, dividing, and transforming the nation. These Truths was published by W. W. Norton in September 2018.

== Title ==
The book's title references the statement in the Declaration of Independence "we hold these truths to be self-evident," which introduces three political ideas that Lepore identifies as the founding pillars of the American experiment: political equality, natural rights, and the sovereignty of the people. These Truths sets out to examine the extent to which the United States has lived up to its ideals.

== Synopsis ==
The book is divided into four sections: "The Idea" (1492-1799), "The People" (1800-1865), "The State" (1866-1945), and "The Machine" (1946-2016). The idea of truth itself is a core theme of the book: Lepore traces how a number of technological and political forces—including newspapers, mass media, propaganda, polling, and political consulting—have fundamentally altered the way that Americans define and understand what is true, ultimately eroding a shared understanding of empirical truth. The book also foregrounds the country's histories of slavery and systemic racism, demonstrating how these injustices have distorted and undermined America's commitment to its founding truths. Lepore illustrates the book's historical narrative by highlighting the stories of a variety of individuals, from well-known figures like Abraham Lincoln to women and people of color like Jane Franklin Mecom and Maria Stewart whose contributions are often overlooked in textbook accounts of American history. Lepore also writes that These Truths "is meant to double as an old-fashioned civics book" that explains "the origins and ends of democratic institutions" such as the two-party system, the nominating convention, and the secret ballot.

== Reception ==
The book was released to widespread critical acclaim, receiving positive reviews from the The New York Times, The Washington Post, and NPR.

It also received the 18th annual Arthur Ross Book Award from the Council on Foreign Relations and the 2018 Massachusetts Book Award.
