= Lords of Finance =

2009 book by Liaquat Ahamed

Lords of Finance: The Bankers Who Broke the World
- Hardcover edition
- Author: Liaquat Ahamed
- Language: English
- Subject: History/U.S. History
- Genre: Non-fiction
- Published: January 22, 2009 Penguin Press
- Publication place: United States
- Media type: Print, e-book
- Pages: 576 pages
- ISBN: 1-59420-182-X
- OCLC: 938869068

Lords of Finance: The Bankers Who Broke the World is a nonfiction book by Liaquat Ahamed about events leading up to and culminating in the Great Depression as told through the personal histories of the heads of the Central Banks of the world's four major economies at the time: Benjamin Strong Jr. of the New York Federal Reserve, Montagu Norman of the Bank of England, Émile Moreau of the Banque de France, and Hjalmar Schacht of the Reichsbank. The text was published on January 22, 2009 by Penguin Press. The book was generally well received by critics and won the 2010 Pulitzer Prize for History. Because the book was published during the 2008 financial crisis, the book subject matter was seen as very relevant to current financial events.

== Plot summary ==
The book narrates the events preceding the Black Tuesday stock market crash of 1929 and the disastrous response of the world's major central banks to steer the world economy from the period during the First World War until the Great Depression. . It follows the life and actions of the then chiefs of the central banks: Benjamin Strong Jr. of the New York Federal Reserve, Montagu Norman of the Bank of England, Émile Moreau of the Banque de France, and Hjalmar Schacht of the Reichsbank. John Maynard Keynes, a well-known British economist of the time appears on many occasions in the book in a role opposing the central bankers. The main theme of the book is the role played by the central bankers' insistence to adhere to the gold standard "even in the face of total catastrophe".

The book also discusses at length the career of the British economist John Maynard Keynes who criticized many of the policies of the heads of the Central Banks during this time.

== Themes ==
One of the main themes of the book is the role played by the central bankers' insistence to adhere to the gold standard "even in the face of total catastrophe." As Joe Nocera, a book reviewer at the New York Times, stated, "the central bankers were prisoners of the economic orthodoxy of their time: the powerful belief that sound monetary policy had to revolve around the gold standard...Again and again, this straitjacket caused the central bankers — especially Norman, gold’s most fervent advocate — to make moves, like raising interest rates, that would allow their countries to hold on to their dwindling gold supplies, even though the larger economy desperately needed help in the form of lower interest rates."

Another theme that runs through the book is how difficult it was to forecast the financial future and how the events would influence world events. "Mr. Ahamed’s opinions are made very clear (the Paris Peace Conference’s plan for Germany to pay war reparations is presented as a great blunder), but his overriding idea is that blame cannot be easily assigned: not even the most sophisticated economists of the era could accurately predict disaster, let alone guard against it. The effects of a public herd mentality at the time of the 1929 stock market crash are depicted, all too recognizably, as unstoppable."

== Production ==
Liaquat Ahamed, a hedge fund manager and Brookings Institution trustee, first got the idea to write the book when he read the 1999 Time story “The Committee to Save the World,” which discussed Alan Greenspan (then the Federal Reserve chairman), Robert Rubin (Bill Clinton’s Treasury Secretary) and Lawrence Summers (Rubin’s No. 2). Ahamed realized that a similar story could be told in the 1920s about the heads of the four central banks, who had acquired a similar mystique and fame regarding their economic acumen.

== Reception ==
The book was awarded the 2010 Pulitzer Prize for History, the 2010 Spear's Book Award (Financial History Book of the Year), the 2010 Arthur Ross Book Award Gold Medal, the 2009 Financial Times and Goldman Sachs Business Book of the Year Award. For 2009 it was listed among the "Best Books of the Year" by Time, The New York Times and Amazon.com. It was shortlisted for the Samuel Johnson Prize.

Joe Nocera at the New York Times called the book "[a] grand, sweeping narrative of immense scope and power, the book describes a world that long ago receded from memory." He also stated that "[b]ecause much of the book concerns decisions...to raise or lower interest rates, you need great characters to pull the story along, and Ahamed not only has them but also knows how to make them come alive."

Robert Peston at the Sunday Times stated that Liaquat Ahamed "provides a compelling and convincing narrative of bungling, tortured bankers vainly trying to reconcile their conflicting duties to their countries and to the global economy. The strength of his book is in humanising the world’s descent into economic chaos. The quartet were dealt an unwinnable hand, in the unsustainable burden of debt heaped on Germany after the first world war in the form of reparations, and the corresponding amounts owed to the US by Britain and France. But these central bankers made serious mistakes."

On September 2, 2010, Chairman of the Federal Reserve Ben Bernanke was asked by the Financial Crisis Inquiry Commission what books or academic papers he would recommend to understand the 2008 financial crisis. The only book that Bernanke recommended was Lords of Finance.

From the left, though conceding that Lords of Finance was 'undoubtedly the most engaging narrative of the run-up to the 1929 Crash to have appeared in recent years', the book was characterized as 'apologia' for latter day 'lords' by the New Left Review: 'damning the 1920s quartet of central bankers, the better to highlight the wisdom of the 1990s trio,' (Alan Greenspan, Robert Rubin and Lawrence Summers) 'and now of their successors: Bernanke, Mervyn King and other saviours since 2008'.

In June 2012, Ahamed himself drew a parallel in a Financial Times column, saying that "during the past few months, as the crisis in Europe has spiralled out of control", he had "begun to fear that the world might in fact be repeating some of th[e] same errors" as those made in the 1920s and 1930s. While the 21st-century central bankers and banks were starkly different from their 19th-century predecessors, Ahamed said that "as they experiment with unconventional monetary tools to get the global economy moving, ironically they may find their years of training less useful than their instincts. ... [S]ome of the same intractable factors that their predecessors of the 1930s had to contend with will overwhelm them once again", today's bankers fear. France, Ahamed pointed out, was the strongest economy and financial system in 1930s Europe, while Germany was reeling. And like Germany seemingly in 2012, France in the 1930s could not find a way to use its strength to help its neighbor. Ahamed in June 2012 concluded with a question: "If, over the next few months, a financial accident takes place in Europe, as is likely, is there any European institution willing and able to act as fast and with such vigour [as the 2008, Lehman-bankruptcy-era US Fed and Treasury] to prevent a disaster?"

== See also ==
- Causes of the Great Depression
