= Jihad: The Rise of Militant Islam in Central Asia =

Book by Ahmed Rashid

- Author: Ahmed Rashid
- Genre: Non-fiction
- Published: 2002
- Publisher: Yale University Press
- Pages: 281
- ISBN: 0300093454
- Dewey Decimal: 958.0429

Jihad: The Rise of Militant Islam in Central Asia is a 2002 non-fiction book written by Ahmed Rashid.

The book became a best-seller.

== Overview ==
Non-fiction book about the rise of militant Islam in Central Asia.

== Author ==
At the time of writing the book, Ahmed Rashid was a columnist for The New York Times.

== Readership ==
Former punk rock musician Henry Rollins was considered a person of interest and questioned by Australian anti-terrorism officials after a fellow passenger reported him for reading Jihad on a flight from Auckland to Melbourne in 2006.
