= The Situation (film) =

- Theatrical poster
- Directed by: Philip Haas
- Written by: Wendell Steavenson
- Produced by: Liaquat Ahamed; Neda Armian; Michael Sternberg
- Starring: Connie Nielsen; Damian Lewis; Mido Hamada; John Slattery; Tom McCarthy
- Cinematography: Sean Bobbitt
- Edited by: Curtiss Clayton
- Music by: Jeff Beal
- Distributed by: Shadow Distribution
- Release date: February 2, 2006 (limited)
- Running time: 106 minutes
- Country: United States
- Language: English

The Situation is a 2006 American war drama film directed by Philip Haas and starring Connie Nielsen. It was produced by Liaquat Ahamed, a Pulitzer Prize-winning author.

== Premise ==
The film plays out against the backdrop of the 2003 Iraq War, where an American journalist (who happens to be in a love triangle between a CIA operative and an Iraqi photographer) is collecting material to write a meaningful story.

== Cast ==
- Connie Nielsen as Anna Molyneux
- Damian Lewis as Dan Murphy
- Mido Hamada as Zaid
- John Slattery as Colonel Carrick
- Tom McCarthy as Major Hanks
- Shaun Evans as Wesley
