= Not One Inch =

2021 book by M. E. Sarotte

Not One Inch: America, Russia, and the Making of Post–Cold War Stalemate
- Author: M. E. Sarotte
- Genre: Post–Cold War politics
- Publisher: Yale University Press
- Publication date: 2021
- Publication place: United States
- ISBN: 9780300259933

Not One Inch: America, Russia, and the Making of Post–Cold War Stalemate is a 2021 book by M. E. Sarotte about the tensions between NATO, including the United States, and Russia in the post–Cold War era, especially those related to NATO's eastward expansion. A main part of the book is examination of whether there was a "broken promise" not to expand NATO eastwards after the reunification of Germany.

Sarotte's research explores why a new European security framework failed to emerge after the Cold War and how decisions made during that period planted the roots of today's geopolitical tensions. Her analysis connects the lack of cohesive cooperation at the time to ongoing rivalries and unresolved conflicts in modern international relations, illustrating how historical choices continue to shape global challenges.

The title of the book, Not One Inch, refers to James Baker's famous statement to Mikhail Gorbachev that NATO would expand "not an inch" to the east. The analysis relies on extensive sources, including over 100 interviews and primary documents and records of contacts between the White House and the Kremlin. Many of the sources she used had previously been classified.

Not One Inch was recommended as one of the best books on foreign policy by Foreign Affairs in 2021 and named one of the Best Books to Read by the Financial Times in 2022.

== Structure ==
The book consists of an introduction, three main parts with ten chapters, a final chapter, a bibliography and an index. It contains eight maps. The English first edition contains an extensive appendix of sources. The three main parts cover three periods and developments from 1989 to 1999, each of which corresponds to a historical turn and political course as well as different main political actors.

The first part focuses on the years 1989–1992, which presents an analysis of German reunification and the collapse of the Soviet Union. Sarotte describes how Helmut Kohl and George H. W. Bush pushed ahead with NATO expansion into East Germany in order to secure the achievements of the Cold War, while Moscow was struggling for power.

The second part analyzes the period 1993–1994, focusing on the relations between Boris Yeltsin and Bill Clinton. Clinton's changing attitude towards Russia is examined, especially against the background of political instability in Russia and Yeltsin's increasing domestic political difficulties and weaknesses.

The third part deals with the years 1995–1999, when Western leaders decided to push ahead with NATO expansion against Russia's explicit opposition and to keep Russia out of the European Union, making long-term cooperation between the US and Russia more difficult.

== Contents ==
Sarotte begins in the first part, The Harvest and the Storm, with the reunification of Germany. With his ten-point plan, Helmut Kohl had preempted Russia's demand that a united Germany must "withdraw from NATO" so that the USSR could agree to reunification. France and the US had reacted negatively to this. During the 1990 meeting in Moscow, Gorbachev declared that any expansion of NATO would be unacceptable. According to Gorbachev, James Baker replied: "We agree with that". However, Sarotte said, the US National Security Council was concerned that Baker was leaning too far out of the window, which was not in line with US strategy. In particular, Baker's statements on the non-expansion were more hypothetical or "exploratory" in nature; his and Hans-Dietrich Genscher's statements did not correspond to the views of the US and West German governments. In an article for the Financial Times in 2023, she highlighted and interpreted this element once again:

What is crucial for any accurate account, however, is the knowledge that this discussion was speculative and highly contingent – and that Baker's boss, US President George H. W. Bush, made it clear at the end of February that he did not consider a limitation of NATO's future desirable or necessary. He insisted that the foreign minister would no longer use such formulations. In obedience, Baker wrote confidentially to his German colleagues in the same month that discussions about NATO's area of responsibility "should be avoided in the future."

Sarotte shows how the US government sought to coordinate with Kohl to avoid further unintended concessions. Part of the strategy was to take into account Russia's economic plight, which Russia did not want to be perceived as blackmail. George Bush had decided early on that the US did not have to offer any concessions at all; Soviet approval of German unity could be bought by a financial concession from Bonn. In view of Bonn's fixation on reunification and Russia's indecisiveness, President Bush proved to be the decisive personality. He answered every concession with Texan sophistication: "To hell with it!". He had considered a hard line necessary, because "we prevailed and they did not." "We cannot allow the Soviets to tear victory out of the jaws of defeat." The coup in the Soviet Union had strengthened the desire of the countries of Eastern Europe to join NATO. In Gorbachev she sees a tragic figure who failed because of his political weakness. Yeltsin had disempowered him by dissolving the Soviet Union. The US then tried to secure the nuclear arsenal and new political priorities prevailed.

In the second part, Clearing, Sarotte states that the US Department of Defense and the Pentagon had suggested a partnership with Russia in order not to anger Russia, but to integrate it. US Secretary of Defense William J. Perry and General John Shalikashvili had therefore proposed the Partnership for Peace, which Yeltsin was enthusiastic about. According to Sarotte, "skilled bureaucratic fighters" such as Antony Lake and Richard Holbrooke had immediately launched a full-scale attack on this proposal, which was supported by Madeleine Albright. After the Republicans' gains in the 1994 midterm elections, President Clinton abandoned the idea of a partnership, which he had previously advocated, in favor of NATO's eastward expansion. She attributes Clinton's reluctance to expand NATO immediately to his consideration for Yeltsin's public image because of the 1996 Russian presidential election. There had also been thought about what Yeltsin would demand in return for NATO expansion. In Clinton's departure from the original plan of a security partnership and in the non-fulfillment of the promise of the "Three Noes" to Yeltsin, Sarotte sees the veritable breach of a promise, not in "not one inch". On January 13, 1995, Clinton described NATO expansion as "inevitable." Clinton's idea of a partnership for peace, according to Sarotte's understanding, would have been suitable "on the one hand to project stability into the eastern half of Europe and on the other hand to embed Russia institutionally." This would have slowed down enlargement significantly, opening up options for establishing a stable cooperative relationship with Russia. Hardliners in Washington and the urging of Central and Eastern European heads of government have counteracted this.

In the third part, Frost, on the years 1995–99, the Clinton administration pushed through eastward expansion more aggressively. The Russian political elite was planned to be involved with G7 membership, the OECD, the WTO and the Paris Club. When Yevgeny Primakov became foreign minister in 1996 and Yeltsin's health was weakening, Sarotte said, the Russian opposition to NATO gained new impetus. The US government had to fend off growing resistance from Europeans, who feared that Moscow could gain a foothold to propose an alternative plan for European security. For Russia, NATO's military action in Kosovo, which was not approved by the UN, came as a shock, which Yeltsin's critics commented on with the words: "Today Belgrade, tomorrow Moscow."

Sarotte's overall verdict is that although the US had been politically more successful, neither country made the best possible use of the political thaw period in the 1990s. Above the final chapter she put a quote from Svetlana Alexievich as her motto: "We have to wait again for the new time, because we missed our chance in the 90s". In the same train of thought, Sarotte quotes Odd Arne Westad, who wrote in 2017 that it was "clear that the West should have dealt with Russia better after the Cold War than it did, not least because Russia, due to its sheer size, would remain a crucial state in any international system under any circumstances."

== Timeline ==
The debate over whether the United States promised the Soviet Union that NATO would expand “not one inch eastward” after German reunification has been the subject of sustained historical and political controversy. Scholars such as Mary Elise Sarotte argue, based on declassified American, German, Soviet, and British records, that no binding, general non-expansion pledge was ever made, and that any such language was quickly walked back by the George H. W. Bush administration. Others, including John Mearsheimer and Jeffrey Sachs, contend that such a promise was indeed made—citing former Soviet officials’ recollections and diplomatic exchanges in early 1990 as evidence of a broader assurance.

=== Early February 1990 – Baker’s “Not One Inch” Statement ===
- 9 February 1990 – US Secretary of State James Baker meets Soviet leader Mikhail Gorbachev in Moscow. According to US memoranda of conversation, Baker tells Gorbachev that NATO jurisdiction would move “not one inch eastward” if Germany were unified in NATO.
- Interpretations:
  - Mearsheimer/Sachs: Evidence of a clear US pledge against eastward NATO expansion beyond a unified Germany.
  - Sarotte: Baker's remark referred only to NATO's military jurisdiction in the territory of the former GDR and was made without Presidential clearance.

=== 10–11 February 1990 – Washington Reconsideration ===
- Baker briefs President George H. W. Bush, who—along with National Security Advisor Brent Scowcroft—considers Baker's formulation strategically unwise. They reject any wording that could be interpreted as a binding commitment.
- Bush instructs that US policy should emphasize that all countries have the right to choose their alliances.

=== 24–25 February 1990 – Camp David Shift ===
- Bush meets West German Chancellor Helmut Kohl at Camp David. Memoranda of conversation record Bush stating: “We prevailed in the Cold War; we must not reward the Soviets for losing it”, stressing that NATO's future posture should not be constrained by early bargaining language.
- Sarotte identifies this meeting as a turning point: the administration decides there will be no formal non-expansion pledge.

=== 31 May – 3 June 1990 – Washington Summit (Bush–Gorbachev) ===
- 31 May 1990 – In private talks at the Washington Summit, Bush tells Gorbachev that the United States supports a “Europe whole and free” and cannot accept agreements limiting nations’ rights to choose alliances.
- 1 June 1990 – At a joint press event, Bush reiterates the principle of free choice for all European states, with no mention of limiting NATO enlargement. This is a public, on-record signal to the Soviet delegation.
- Sarotte’s reading: This was the moment Bush personally communicated to Gorbachev—face-to-face—that no general “not one inch” pledge existed.
- Mearsheimer/Sachs: Despite such public remarks, the earlier assurances had already shaped Soviet expectations and constituted a broken promise.

=== 12 September 1990 – "Two Plus Four" Treaty ===
- The Treaty on the Final Settlement with Respect to Germany permits a unified Germany to remain in NATO, but limits foreign NATO troops and nuclear weapons in the territory of the former East Germany.
- The treaty does not address NATO's future enlargement into other Eastern European countries.

=== 1991 – Warsaw Pact Dissolution and Post–Cold War Context ===
- As Eastern European states move toward NATO partnerships in the mid-1990s, Russian officials—including Gorbachev—publicly recall the “not one inch” phrase, interpreting it as a broader non-expansion commitment.
- Western archival sources, however, show no binding legal or written agreement covering countries outside the former GDR.

=== Scholarly assessment ===
- Sarotte: No binding, general non-expansion promise existed; “not one inch” was a fleeting diplomatic phrase, superseded by Bush's explicit communications to Gorbachev from late May 1990 onward.
- Mearsheimer/Sachs: Early 1990 statements by Baker, Kohl, and other Western leaders created a political commitment—whether or not written—which was later disregarded.

== Reviews ==
=== Boris Begovic (University of Belgrade) ===
In his September 2022 review, drawing upon Mary Elise Sarotte's historical analysis, professor emeritus Branko Begovic of the University of Belgrade Faculty of Law argues that NATO's post–Cold War eastward expansion critically weakened pro-Western liberal reformers in Russia while emboldening nationalist hardliners, ultimately leaving Russia in a more disadvantageous strategic position. Begovic further highlights the US government's unwavering adherence to established policies as a striking feature of post-1991 geopolitics, attributing this rigidity to the paramount importance of maintaining credibility and reputation, which he suggests creates a disincentive for acknowledging policy missteps.

He posits that the absence of an institutional framework comparable to the Yalta Conference, which historically delineated spheres of influence, underscores the reduced significance of raw military power in shaping contemporary international outcomes. Additionally, Begovic offers a pointed critique of 1990s Russian political leadership, characterizing their approach as marked by a blend of idealism and political naiveté. Referring to Gary Saul Morson and Aleksandr Solzhenitsyn, he likens them with politicians after the 1917 Revolution.

They seem to have succumbed to the illusion that liberal democracy itself, almost like a magic wand, would solve all problems and eliminate all dilemmas. As if all the problems, discrepancies and legitimate interests that exist within the country or in international relations were in reality the consequence of the former authoritarian regime". "We are friends now" was the attitude of the majority of the new Russian political elite in the early 1990s. For the other, the American side, it was a matter of "business as usual" – the preservation of what the political elite considered to be the strategic interests of the United States vis-à-vis the other side.

The way in which the US helped Russia obtain loans from the IMF "against the rules", similar to what it later did with Ukraine, ruined international institutions and their credibility, according to Begovic. The concern of nuclear power Russia about a threat seems paranoid to Begovic, but it must be taken into account that even paranoid people have enemies. The other side didn't care one iota about these worries. Begovic seems uncertain whether Russia would have attacked Ukraine if it had not been offered NATO membership at the Bucharest summit. If NATO had not expanded, a distinct new security structure would have emerged for Europe, with much less opportunity to draw new lines. In this case, he sees a strong and independent Germany in the middle of Europe.

However, the nostalgia for Russia's past position of power and also Russia's internal disturbances can hardly be traced back to NATO, and Putin's rise also had little to do with NATO, but was supported by problemizing it. Regardless of Russia's imperial nostalgia, Sarotte also provides numerous proofs of the "imperial attitude of the USA". Begovic finds it remarkable that high-ranking US officials are apparently not aware of this attitude or take it for granted. He quotes Madeleine Albright: "The crucial question was how to manage Russia's regression from an imperial to a normal nation," and comments: "By this standard, America has not been a normal nation, at least since the end of the Cold War."

On the question of the avoidability of the war, he quotes Dominic Lieven's explaining the war as a belated consequence of the dissolution of the Soviet Union, the "late revenge of the old security apparatus for the 30 years of humiliation, retreat and defeat." With Michael McFaul, he sees the possibility that the conflict could have been avoided. On the Russian side, Begovic sees a communication problem, Ukraine's membership as a red line had not been communicated clearly enough.

=== Matthias Dembinski (Portal für Politikwissenschaft) ===
Matthias Dembinski, a researcher at the Peace Research Institute Frankfurt (PRIF) and contributor to the Portal für Politikwissenschaft, identifies one of the central arguments in Mary Elise Sarotte's work as the proposition that a "balancing act" between integrating Russia into the post–Cold War order and stabilizing Central and Eastern European states might have been feasible with greater diplomatic attention to Russian interests and sensitivities. Dembinski clarifies that Sarotte's critique does not oppose NATO enlargement per se but rather emphasizes the lack of strategic foresight in its execution, particularly the failure to mitigate perceptions of marginalization in Moscow.

He further contends that Sarotte's analysis may understate the significance of the 1997 NATO-Russia Founding Act, a key diplomatic framework aimed at fostering transparency and cooperation in European security. Dembinski posits that Russian opposition to enlargement stemmed less from immediate military concerns than from fears of losing political influence over former Warsaw Pact allies and Soviet republics, coupled with anxieties about exclusion from critical decisions shaping Europe's security architecture. As he notes,

More than the immediate military consequences of enlargement, Moscow probably feared two other consequences, namely, to lose complete influence with the former Warsaw Pact partner countries and Soviet republics and to be successively excluded from decisions on European security issues.

=== Andrew Moravcsik (Foreign Affairs) ===
Andrew Moravcsik reviewed the book for the Council on Foreign Relations. He finds Sarotte's argument speculative that the alleged betrayal was an important factor in the subsequent collapse of democracy in Russia and the further deterioration of relations between the West and Russia under President Vladimir Putin. In his opinion, the book's overwhelming evidence suggests that George H. W. Bush and Bill Clinton slowed down NATO expansion in order to try to stabilize the government of Russian President Boris Yeltsin in the short term, waiting as long as he still seemed viable. "It was only when Yeltsin's fall was imminent and a hardening of East-West relations seemed inevitable that the United States began to expand the alliance." Andrew Moravcsik and he said the book was "engaging" and a "carefully documented account" of the diplomacy in the Post–Cold War.

=== Rodric Braithwaite (Financial Times) ===
Rodric Braithwaite reviewed the book for the Financial Times. He said the book had a "great narrative and analytical flair, admirable objectivity", he praised the details and said it was a riveting account of NATO enlargement.

=== Robert Service (Literary Review) ===
Robert Service, in his April 2024 review of the Literary Review, emphasizes that Sarotte, more than any other historian before, has highlighted the campaigns of most other countries in the eastern half of Europe to join NATO. Sarotte had come to the thesis that neither Gorbachev nor Baker had been honest about what was said and what it meant. „... when (Baker) was working on the final draft of his memoirs, (he cut out) passages from his research team... that indicated some intensification on his part." Sarotte also depicts Yeltsin's debates with Clinton on NATO problems. Yeltsin had wanted Russia to integrate with the West, and the Partnership for Peace seemed to be a springboard on the way to Russian NATO membership. This is behind Yeltsin's approval of NATO expansion. This approval refutes Putin's claims. Sarotte, however, includes alternative options for action:

As long as Yeltsin was in power, much more should have been done to design a continental security arrangement that Russia could feel comfortable with in the long run. It wouldn't have been easy. But it could have helped spare Ukraine the 'special military operation' that killed thousands of Ukrainians and turned millions of them into refugees.

=== Bradley Reynolds (University of Helsinki) ===
Bradley Reynolds' review (2021) emphasizes Sarotte's understanding that, due to the "ongoing negotiation aspect of NATO's role" in the 1990s, the statement not an inch was more an expression of a multifaceted, fluctuating process of "common complicity" than a singular promise between Baker and Gorbachev in 1990. The collapse of the Soviet Union and the emerging threat of nuclear proliferation in the New Independent States had prompted NATO to reconsider enlargement beyond a reunified Germany. The former Warsaw Pact states have also reconsidered their security and shifted their focus from institutions such as the Conference on Security and Cooperation in Europe (CSCE – OSCE after 1994) and the EU to full membership in NATO as their fears of a collapse of the Soviet Union increased. Fears of nuclear proliferation sparked fears about how NATO and a new Confederation of Independent States (CIS) interact. These fears were reflected in Gorbachev's – and then Boris Yeltsin's – hopes that Russia might eventually be able to join NATO. Reynolds sees in Sarotte's account a shortcoming in the omission of the perspective of the smaller European countries. However, he emphasizes that Sarotte did not see her work as a "final word" but as a starting point for further research and that she agrees with Marc Trachtenberg's judgment that historical scholarship cannot judge the political value and worthlessness of events. Historical analysis alone cannot really answer the fundamental question of how to judge the policy of NATO enlargement, and it is certainly not the task of the historian to judge the past."

=== Christian Tuschhoff (Politische Vierteljahresschrift) ===
In his review of September 27, 2022, Christian Tuschhoff critically emphasizes that Sarotte does not offer an independent, systematic analysis of American behavior, but concentrates on the description of events and actors without classifying their decisions in the context of larger political or structural contexts. In addition, the author's proximity to the interviewed actors had a detrimental effect. According to Tuschhoff, their presentation contains numerous interesting details, but these are often presented without critical distance. Despite all the abundance of documents, the work remains strongly descriptive. Theoretical concepts such as power politics or "international respect research" are supported by the facts, but not explicitly analyzed by Sarotte himself. Sarotte shows how the US has disappointed Russian expectations through deliberate deception and "salami tactics". But it does not analyze in depth the long-term effects of this revisionist policy on European security and the Russian response. The author largely dispenses with independent analysis and conclusions, but is content with stories up to a certain "joy in gossip". Thus, the attempt to create cost-benefit calculations for the conceivable options in the conclusions remains stuck in the experimental stage. He finds it important that the author finds numerous pieces of evidence that clearly refute recent statements by contemporary witnesses such as that of Horst Teltschik that no one thought of NATO in Eastern Europe at the time of reunification. "But the documents clearly show that this question was already omnipresent at that time."

=== Marcin Waldoch (Świat Idei i Polityki) ===
In his review of December 1, 2022, Marcin Waldoch (Uniwersytet Kazimierza Wielkiego w Bydgoszcz) criticises Sarotte's implicit view that NATO's eastward expansion had been harmful to the world order. He sees potentially serious consequences in this view for countries such as Poland, which are dependent on NATO expansion as a security guarantee. From Waldoch's perspective, the eastward expansion of Eastern European countries is seen more as a necessity and success, while Sarotte's criticism of expansion may reflect a Western-centric view that takes less account of the security interests of these countries. Waldoch does not see NATO membership for countries like Poland as a geopolitical decision by the West, but as an existential need to ensure their own sovereignty and security after decades of Soviet dominance. Sarottes is focusing too much on the negative effects of NATO expansion on relations between the West and Russia. Another point of criticism by Waldoch concerns the source basis of the book. He notes that much of the information comes from journalistic sources such as the New York Times or the Washington Post, which he believes may limit the depth and objectivity of the analysis. Nevertheless, he acknowledges the quality of research and the analytical strength of Sarotte's work but sees the need to focus more strongly on the perspective of the Eastern European countries concerned.

=== Joshua Jaffa (New Yorker) ===
Joshua Jaffa judged in The New Yorker in January 2022, a month before the start of the war, that Sarotte's new findings both fill in and complicate the established narratives on both sides. Sarotte told him that she wanted to write a "non-triumphalist history" of the end of the Cold War, the opposite of the version "that most of us know: a story of victory, freedom and opportunity." These feelings of the people in Eastern Europe are not wrong, but she asks what the same story means for someone like Putin, who saw it as a catastrophe. Is this less relevant?

"There is a not insignificant chance that we will see a massive European land war in 2022, at least in part due to how Russia believes the West has dealt with the end of the Cold War."

Sarotte would not say that the West had taken advantage of Russia, but the Western powers would have done well to heed an aphorism by Winston Churchill: "In victory: magnanimity". Regarding the historical facts, she said that in the current situation, Putin is more concerned with "political arithmetic" than with historical accuracy.

=== Andreas Hilger ===
In his May 17, 2022 review for H-Soz-Kult, Andreas Hilger acknowledged the strengths of Mary Elise Sarotte's Not One Inch: America, Russia, and the Making of Post–Cold War Stalemate but critiqued its limited exploration of how NATO's post–Cold War expansion intersected with broader US strategic interests in regions such as China, Central Asia, and the Middle East. Hilger argued that Sarotte's analysis only briefly addresses these global linkages, leaving the role of China and non-military factors (e.g., economic aid programs) underexamined. He further noted that the book insufficiently connects NATO enlargement to Washington's broader geopolitical calculus, which included countering emerging powers and securing influence within and beyond Europe.

Sarotte contends that NATO expansion and mutual misperceptions entrenched a structural stalemate: Western policymakers underestimated Russian sensitivities to the alliance's eastward growth, while Moscow increasingly retreated into Soviet-nostalgic narratives. This dynamic, Sarotte argues, laid the groundwork for contemporary conflicts such as the Ukraine crisis. Although alternative policies might have fostered cooperation, entrenched power politics and competing historical myths left little space for compromise.

=== Other reviews ===
- Thomas Speckmann: Wider Moskaus Mythen. In: Frankfurter Allgemeine Zeitung. 14 November 2023, S. 6;
- Andreas Hilger: M. Sarotte: Not One Inch. In: H-Soz-Kult, 17 May 2022;
- Fred Kaplan: “A Bridge Too Far”. In: The New York Review of Books. Volume 69, Issue 6, 7 April 2022.
- Henning Næss: A logical consequence of the Cold War? In: Modern Times Review, 10 April 2023.
- Andrew Moravcsik: Not One Inch: America, Russia, and the Making of Post–Cold War Stalemate. In: Foreign Affairs, 19. Oktober 2021.
- Rodric Braithwaite: Ukraine through the lens of history. In: Financial Times, 1 February 2022.
- Robert Service: Not One Inch: America, Russia, and the Making of the Post–Cold War Stalemate by M E Sarotte. In: Literary Review, 22 December 2024.
- Matthias Dembinski: Mary Elise Sarotte: Nicht einen Schritt weiter nach Osten: Amerika, Russland und die wahre Geschichte der Nato-Osterweiterung. In: Portal für Politikwissenschaft. 6 February 2024.
- Boris Begovic: Book review "Not One Inch: America, Russia, and the Making of Post–Cold War Stalemate", by Mary Elise Sarotte. September 2022.
- Bradley Reynolds: Not one inch: America, Russia, and the making of post–Cold War stalemate: Mary Sarotte. New Haven: Yale University Press, 2021, In: Cold War History, 23(1), S. 209–212.https://doi.org/10.1080/14682745.2022.2077313
- Joshua Yaffa: The Historical Dispute Behind Russia’s Threat to Invade Ukraine. The New Yorker, 25 January 2022.
- Christian Tuschhoff: Sarotte, Mary E.: Not One Inch. America, Russia, and the Making of Post–Cold War Stalemate. In: Politische Vierteljahresschrift, 63, 4. Springer Fachmedien Wiesbaden 2022, p. 763–765.

== Interviews ==
In 2023, Sarotte commented in an interview with T-Online that Putin's claims about NATO's eastward expansion were propaganda: The Two Plus Four Treaty allowed NATO to expand eastwards, she contends. The oral statements, "let's call it a verbal gentlemen's agreement for my sake," are in contrast to the written two-plus-four contract. "It was tough, everyone knew that only what is written in black and white in the contract counts." As a historian, after analyzing the sources she could only tell: "Neither one nor the other statement is completely correct." James Baker, the US Secretary of State at the time, had actually sounded out the possibility in 1990 in a conversation with Mikhail Gorbachev whether Moscow would agree to German unity in exchange for the promise that NATO would not expand eastwards. In accordance with Bush's instructions, Baker then let the issue rest, while Hans-Dietrich Genscher did not and was reprimanded for it in a letter from Chancellor Helmut Kohl. Moscow finally signed the contract and collected billions for it. The weakness of the Soviet Union behind their decisions had been well known to every Western negotiator.

== See also ==
- Controversy in Russia regarding the legitimacy of eastward NATO expansion
- Treaty on the Final Settlement with Respect to Germany
