= Philip Bobbitt =

American legal scholar (born 1948)

Sir Philip Bobbitt KBE
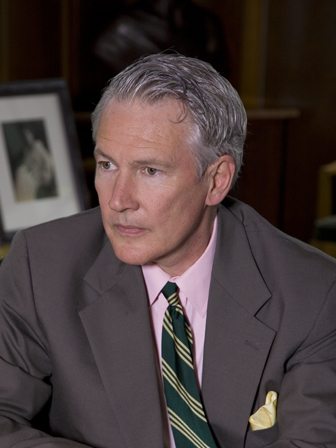
- Bobbitt in 2007
- Born: July 22, 1948 (age 78); Temple, Texas, U.S.
- Education: Princeton University (BA); Yale University (JD); Nuffield College, Oxford (DPhil)
- Children: 4
- Relatives: Lyndon B. Johnson (uncle); Samuel Ealy Johnson Jr. (grandfather)

Sir Philip Chase Bobbitt (born July 22, 1948) is an American legal scholar and political theorist. He is best known for work on U.S. constitutional law and theory, and on the relationship between law, strategy and history in creating and sustaining the State. He is currently the Herbert Wechsler Professor of Jurisprudence at Columbia Law School and a distinguished senior lecturer at the University of Texas School of Law.

Henry Kissinger called him "the outstanding political philosopher of our time". He is the author of several books, including Constitutional Fate: Theory of the Constitution (1982), The Shield of Achilles: War, Peace and the Course of History (2002), and Terror and Consent: the Wars for the Twenty-first Century (2008).

== Early life and education ==
Philip Bobbitt was born in Temple, Texas, on July 22, 1948. He is the only child of Oscar Price Bobbitt Jr (1918–1995) and Rebekah Luruth Johnson Bobbitt. Oscar Price Bobbitt Jr was the son of Oscar Price Bobbitt Sr (1892–1965) and Maude Wisner, a direct descendant of Henry Wisner of Swiss descent, the only delegate from New York to vote for the Declaration of Independence. Rebekah Bobbitt was the daughter of Samuel Ealy Johnson Jr. and Rebekah Baines. Her father and grandfather were members of the Texas Legislature; her great-grandfather was president of Baylor University. Her brother was Lyndon B. Johnson, 36th president of the United States from 1963 to 1969. Between high school and college, Bobbitt spent a summer with Johnson at the White House.

At the age of 15, Bobbitt graduated from Stephen F. Austin High School, where he was elected president of the student council, in 1964. He then attended Princeton University and graduated with a Bachelor of Arts in philosophy in 1971. His student thesis, "On Wittgenstein and a Philosophical Topology," was one of the earliest attempts to argue for an underlying continuity between the Tractatus Logico-Philosophicus and the Philosophical Investigations. It was advised by philosopher Richard Rorty. While at Princeton, Bobbitt was president of the Ivy Club and Chairman of the Nassau Literary Magazine.

Bobbitt left Princeton after three semesters to enter AmeriCorps VISTA. He worked in a poverty program in an all-black area of Los Angeles for two years before returning to college. In 1975, he received his Juris Doctor (J.D.) from Yale Law School, where he was the articles editor of the Yale Law Journal. It was at Yale that he met Charles L. Black Jr. (1915–2001), who became a friend and mentor.

After law school, Bobbitt clerked for Judge Henry Friendly of the United States Court of Appeals for the Second Circuit. He then received his D.Phil. in modern history from the University of Oxford in 1983 as a member of Nuffield College.

== Career ==
Bobbitt's first book, Tragic Choices (1978), was written with Yale Law Professor (later Dean and Judge of the Second Circuit) Guido Calabresi. The book was a study of how societies make difficult decisions concerning resources and rights—e.g., who gets expensive medical care, who is to be drafted into the army, who may have children, and other society-defining choices. Tragic Choices has won a number of awards and is studied by multiple disciplines, including law. It has been especially influential in the field of bioethics and was discussed in several countries during the COVID-19 virus pandemic. Writing in The Times of London about the pandemic, Philip Collins said, "The tragic choice is the pivot of the action in classical tragedy, and a perennial dilemma in the history of philosophy. The best book on how tragedy turns up in politics is Guido Calabresi and Philip Bobbitt's Tragic Choices...In each case a moral imperative clashes with the scarcity of resources."

His second book, Constitutional Fate: Theory of the Constitution, first proposed the model of the six fundamental forms of constitutional argument. One critic subsequently called it, "the outstanding recent work treating constitutional law in terms of the legitimating effects of constitutional argument. It ranks among the most original and impressive works of American jurisprudence to appear during the decade." In 1994, Akhil Amar described Constitutional Fate as "one of a handful of truly towering works of constitutional theory in the last half-century." Henry Monaghan, Harlan Fiske Stone Professor of Constitutional Law, Columbia School has said of Constitutional Fate, "I did not realize it at the time Constitutional Fate was published, but I do now. This is the most important and influential book on judicial review written in my lifetime."

Bobbitt was also at Nuffield College, Oxford, where he was Anderson Senior Research Fellow and a member of the Modern History faculty from 1983 to 1990; later he was the Marsh Christian Senior Research Fellow in the Department of War Studies at King's College London 1994–1997. From 1981 to 1982, and again in 2004 he was visiting research fellow at the International Institute for Strategic Studies.

Until 2007, Bobbitt held the A.W. Walker Centennial Chair at the University of Texas, where he taught constitutional law. In 2005 he was the James Barr Ames Visiting professor of law at Harvard Law School; in 2007, Bobbitt was the Samuel Rubin Visiting professor of law at Columbia Law School, where he accepted a permanent chair later that year; he is now the Herbert Wechsler Professor of Jurisprudence at Columbia and director of the Center for National Security there. He remains distinguished senior lecturer at the University of Texas Law School and senior fellow in the Robert S. Strauss Center for International Security and Law at the University of Texas.

Bobbitt has delivered the Mellon Lectures at Oxford University, the Murphy Lecture on Constitutional Law at Princeton, the All Souls College Lectures at Oxford University, among several honorary lectures. In 2016 he was awarded the Jean Mayer Global Citizen Award by Tufts University.

He has been elected a member of the International Institute for Strategic Studies, the Pacific Council on International Affairs, the American Society of International Law, a Life Member of the American Law Institute, a member of the Council on Foreign Relations, and Fellow of the Royal Historical Society. In 1994, he was a Fellow at the Wilson Center for International Scholars in Washington. He serves as a member of the Commission on the Continuity of Government and served on the Task Force on Law and National Security of the Hoover Institution at Stanford. For some years he has been a juror for the Civil Courage Prize. In May 2010, he was appointed to serve as a member of the Secretary of State's Advisory Committee on International Law. In 2011, he was elected to membership in the Common Room at All Souls College, Oxford. In 2012, Bobbitt was appointed to the External Advisory Board for the Central Intelligence Agency, on which he served until January 2017.

=== Views on constitutional law ===
Like many contemporary scholars, Bobbitt believes that the Constitution's durability rests, in part, in the flexible manner in which it can be and has been interpreted since its creation. He emphasizes the "modalities of constitutional argument": 1) structural; 2) textual; 3) ethical; 4) prudential; 5) historical; and 6) doctrinal. He has argued in his books for the recognition of the ethical modality, which has to do with the traditional vision we have of the nation and the role government ought to play (some scholars call this form "argument from tradition"). He first introduced these forms of argument—or modalities—as a way of understanding constitutional review generally in Constitutional Fate: Theory of the Constitution (1982), a study of judicial review and then broadened their application to constitutional review generally in Constitutional Interpretation (1993) which deals with non-judicial examples of constitutional argument and decision making. Bobbitt asserts that all branches of government have a duty to assess the constitutionality of their actions. Bobbitt's "modalities" of constitutional law are now generally considered to be the standard model for constitutional arguments.

=== Government service ===
Bobbitt has served extensively in government, for both Democratic and Republican administrations. In the 1970s, he was Associate Counsel to President Carter for which he received the Certificate of Meritorious Service, and worked with Lloyd Cutler on the charter of the Central Intelligence Agency. He later was Legal Counsel to the Iran-Contra Committee in the U. S. Senate, the Counselor for International Law and member of the Senior Executive Service at the State Department during the George H. W. Bush administration, and served at the National Security Council, where he was director for Intelligence Programs, senior director for Critical Infrastructure, and senior director for Strategic Planning during Bill Clinton's presidency. He was a principal draftsman of PDD63, the first presidential document to establish a strategy for critical infrastructure and cyber protection. Subsequently, he was strategist in residence to the Secretary of the Navy, Richard Danzig, and has lectured at West Point, Annapolis, and the National Defense University where for some years he delivered the annual opening keynote lecture.

== Other works ==
In the early '80s, Bobbitt published Democracy and Deterrence: The History and Future of Nuclear Strategy. This book argued that US nuclear targeting had gone through reciprocal cycles, alternating between total and graduated response regimes. These cycles were driven, he argued, not by changes in the central deterrence relationship between the American homeland and the homelands of its adversaries but by developments in extended deterrence—the protection of non-homeland theatres by US nuclear forces. An accompanying volume, US Nuclear Strategy: A Reader was edited by Bobbitt, Gregory F. Treverton and Sir Lawrence Freedman.

Bobbitt's most recent two books are second editions of classics in US law, The Ages of American Law by Grant Gilmore, first published by the 1970s which Bobbitt brought up to present time; and Impeachment: A Handbook by Charles Black. Impeachment was doubled in size, and was widely discussed during the various Trump proceedings. Both books were published by the Yale Press.

Bobbitt is currently at work on The Constitution Trilogy for Oxford University Press.

== Other activities ==
Since 1990, Bobbitt has endowed the Rebekah Johnson Bobbitt National Prize for Poetry, awarded biennially by the Library of Congress. It is the only prize given by the nation for poetry.

He is a Fellow of the American Academy of Arts and Sciences, and a former trustee of Princeton University. In 2004 Prospect Magazine named him One of Britain's Top 100 Public Intellectuals. He occasionally writes essays, typically on foreign policy, published in The New York Times, and The Guardian. He has served on the boards of the Institute for Religious Studies; the Barbara Jordan Freedom Foundation, the Rothko Interfaith Chapel, the Executive Council of the American Society of International Law, and the editorial board of Biosecurity and Bioterrorism. He is a member of the executive committee of The Pilgrims.

In 2021 Bobbitt was made an honorary Knight Commander of the Order of the British Empire (KBE). The appointment was made substantive on 11 June 2024.

In 2021, he became the chair of the American Friends of St James's Church, Piccadilly; in 2023 he was selected as president.

In late 2024, he was elected President of the Pilgrims Society of the United States.

== Personal life ==
Bobbitt has been married twice. His second marriage was in 2011, to Maya Ondalikoglu, a former student. They were married by U.S. Supreme Court Associate Justice Elena Kagan in her chambers. Lady Bobbitt took her BA, summa cum laude, at the University of Pennsylvania where she gave the Commencement Address at her graduation.

== Selected publications ==
=== Books ===
- Constitutional Fate: Theory of the Constitution. New York & Oxford: Oxford University Press, 1984. ISBN 0-19-503422-8
- Democracy and Deterrence: The History and Future of Nuclear Strategy. New York: St. Martin's Press, 1987. ISBN 0-312-00523-7
- United States Nuclear Strategy: A Reader. (Co-editor, with Gregory F. Treverton and Lawrence Freedman.) New York: New York University Press, 1989. ISBN 0-8147-1107-3
- Tragic Choices. (Co-author: Guido Calabresi.) New York: W.W. Norton, 1990. ISBN 0-393-09085-X
- Constitutional Interpretation. Blackwell, 1991. ISBN 0-631-16485-5
- The Shield of Achilles: War, Peace, and the Course of History. Foreword by Michael Howard. New York: Alfred A. Knopf, 2002. ISBN 0-375-41292-1 (Paperback [2003] ISBN 0-385-72138-2), 2003 Grand Prize Winner, Robert W. Hamilton Awards and bronze medalist, Arthur Ross Book Award
- Terror and Consent: the Wars for the Twenty-first Century. Knopf/Penguin, 2008.
- Garments of Court and Palace: Machiavelli and the World That He Made. New York. Atlantic Monthly Press, 2013 . ISBN 978-0-8021-2074-8
- The Ages of American Law (Lead Author: Grant Gilmore.) New Haven: Yale University Press, 2d Edition [2014] ISBN 978-0300189919
- Impeachment: A Handbook. (Lead Author: Charles L. Black Jr.) New Haven: Yale University Press [2018] ISBN 978-0-300-23826-6

=== The Shield of Achilles ===
In 2002, Knopf published The Shield of Achilles: War, Peace and the Course of History (Knopf), an ambitious 900-page work that explicates a theory, actually a philosophy, of historical change in the modern era, and a history of the development of modern constitutional and international law. Bobbitt traces interacting patterns in the (mainly modern European) history of strategic innovations, major wars, peace conferences, international diplomacy, and constitutional standards for states. Bobbitt also suggests possible future scenarios and policies appropriate to them.

Arguing that "law and strategy are not merely made in history. . . they are made of history" (p. 5), Bobbitt presents a dynamic view of historical change that has a dark, tragic dimension, for he holds that the painful and, indeed, atrocious process of resolving issues that create conflict and war tends to cause changes that render obsolete the solution to that conflict (generally a new form of the state possessing a new principle of legitimacy), even as it is established. This tragic dimension is evoked in the title of Bobbitt's book, inspired by the last lines of Book 18 of Homer's Iliad, describing a shield fabricated for Achilles by Hephaestus, across the "vast expanse" of which "with all his craft and cunning/the god creates a world of gorgeous immortal work" (trans. Robert Fagles).

The Shield of Achilles generated much interest in the diplomatic and political community. Public officials who followed Bobbitt's works included Prime Minister of the United Kingdom, Tony Blair; the Archbishop of Canterbury, Rowan Williams, who built his Dimbleby Lecture around Bobbitt's thesis and the former United States Secretary of State Henry Kissinger

The Shield of Achilles was the 2003 Grand Prize Winner of the Hamilton Awards and the Arthur Ross Book Award Bronze Medalist of the Council on Foreign Relations for Best Book in Foreign Policy of that year. British military historian Michael Howard wrote, The Shield of Achilles "will be one of the most important works on international relations published during the last fifty years", and Paul Kennedy, writing in The New York Review of Books argued that it may "become a classic for future generations." In contrast, a strongly critical review by Paul W. Schroeder in The National Interest, while acknowledging that his view was "evidently a minority one", described the book as "error strewn" and "unscholarly".

=== Terror and Consent ===
In 2008, Knopf published Bobbitt's Terror and Consent: the Wars for the Twenty-first Century, which applied many of the ideas of The Shield of Achilles to the problems of wars on terror. In Terror & Consent, Bobbitt argued that the only justification for warfare in the 21st century was to protect human rights.

Terror and Consent was on both the New York Times and the London Evening Standard’s best-seller lists and was widely reviewed. The front page of the New York Times Sunday Book Review called it, "quite simply the most profound book to have been written on the subject of American foreign policy since the attacks of 9/11 — indeed, since the end of the cold war." Among others, Senator John McCain praised the book as "the best book I've ever read on terrorism," and Henry Kissinger called Bobbitt, "perhaps the most important political philosopher today."Tony Blair wrote of Terror and Consent, "It may be written by an academic but it is actually required reading for political leaders." David Cameron, the leader of the UK Conservative Party put it on a list of summer reading for his parliamentary colleagues in 2008.

In 2017, he had a spirited exchange arguing that litigation is not the exclusive legal method for determining constitutionality in national security affairs and that law applied even when the constitutional issue in question was not justiciable. General Sir Rupert Smith wrote that Terror and Consent, "shows more convincingly than any other book I know, why the defeat of terrorism must be brought about within the context of law." Bobbitt is currently at work on a third book in this series, The Bow of Odysseus: Statecraft and the Future of World Order.

=== The Garments of Court and Palace ===
In 2013, Bobbitt published a study of Niccolò Machiavelli and historiography entitled The Garments of Court and Palace: Machiavelli and the World That He Made. In this book he argues that only by understanding The Prince as one half of a constitutional treatise on the State (the other being Machiavelli's Discourses on Livy) can we reconcile the many otherwise contradictory elements of his work. Bobbitt also situates this constitutional treatise in the politics of Machiavelli's day.

== See also ==
- Long War (20th century)
