= Harry G. Summers Jr. =

American military writer and soldier (1932–1999)

Harry G. Summers Jr. (May 6, 1932 – November 14, 1999) is best known as the author of an analysis of the Vietnam War, On Strategy: A Critical Analysis of the Vietnam War (1982). An infantry colonel in the US Army, he had served as a squad leader in the Korean War and as a battalion and corps operations officer in the Vietnam War. Summers was also an instructor and Distinguished Fellow at the Strategic Studies Institute at the US Army War College in Carlisle, Pennsylvania, and served on the negotiation team for the United States at the end of the Vietnam War.

Aside from his books, Summers wrote a syndicated national newspaper column on national security affairs for the Los Angeles Times and was the editor of Vietnam Magazine. He was also a frequent speaker at colleges, lectures, and debates.

During Operation Desert Storm, Summers served as a color commentator and analyst on the ongoing live network news broadcasts and for a time became a familiar face to the television viewers. In 1992, he wrote a book on the Gulf War, On Strategy II: A Critical Analysis of the Gulf War.

== Selected bibliography ==
=== Books ===
- On Strategy: A Critical Analysis of the Vietnam War, Harry G. Summers Jr., Presidio press, 1982, ISBN 0-89141-563-7, ISBN 978-0-89141-563-3 (225 pages)
- On Strategy II: A Critical Analysis of the Gulf War, Harry G. Summers, Dell, 1992, ISBN 0-440-21194-8, ISBN 978-0-440-21194-5 (302 pages)
- Historical Atlas of the Vietnam War, Harry G Summers, Stanley Karnow, Houghton Mifflin Co, 1995 ISBN 0-395-72223-3, ISBN 978-0-395-72223-7 (224 pages)
- The New World Strategy: A Military Policy for America's Future, Harry G. Summers, Simon & Schuster, 1995, ISBN 0-684-81208-8, ISBN 978-0-684-81208-3 (270 pages)
- Persian Gulf War Almanac, Harry G. Summers, Facts on File, 1995, ISBN 0-8160-2821-4, ISBN 978-0-8160-2821-4 (301 pages)
- The Vietnam War Almanac, Harry G. Summers, Presidio/Ballantine Books, 1999, ISBN 0-89141-692-7, ISBN 978-0-89141-692-0 (432 pages)
- Korean War Almanac, Harry G. Summers Jr., Replica Books, 1999, ISBN 0-7351-0209-0, ISBN 978-0-7351-0209-5 (348 pages)
- On Strategy: The Vietnam War in Context, Harry G Summers Jr., Lightning Source Inc, 2002, ISBN 1-4102-0419-7, ISBN 978-1-4102-0419-6 (152 pages)

=== Book contributions ===
- Desert Storm, edited by Military History Magazine, with Foreword By Harry Summers Jr., Howell Press, 1991, ISBN 0-943231-46-9, ISBN 978-0-943231-46-4 (176 pages)
- Phoenix and the Birds of prey: Counterinsurgency and Counterterrorism in Vietnam; Mark Moyar, Contributor Harry G. Summers Jr., Published by U of Nebraska Press, 2007 ISBN 0-8032-1602-5, ISBN 978-0-8032-1602-0 (496 pages)

=== Other ===
- Principles of War: The American Genesis; Reprint of Major (later Colonel) Edward S. Johnston's 1934 article, The Science of War with introduction and commentary by Colonel Wallace P. Franz, Infantry and Colonel Harry G. Summers Jr., Infantry.
