= Liaquat Ahamed =

American author (born 1952)

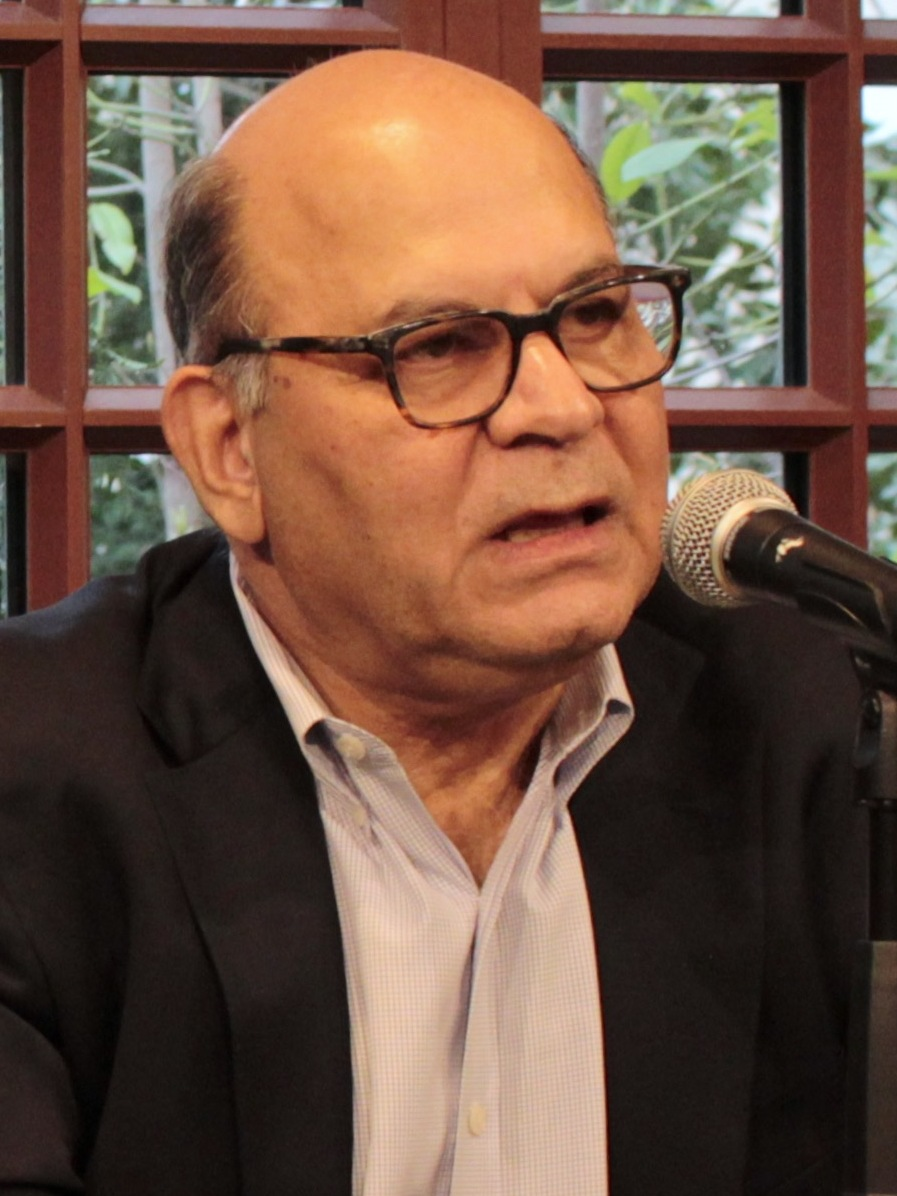
- Ahamed in 2022
- Born: 14 November 1952 (age 73); Kenya
- Occupation: Author
- Known for: Lords of Finance

Liaquat Ahamed (born 14 November 1952 in Kenya) is an American investment specialist and author. In 2009 he published Lords of Finance: The Bankers Who Broke the World, which won numerous awards including the 2010 Pulitzer Prize for History, the 2010 Spear's Book Award (Financial History Book of the Year), the 2010 Arthur Ross Book Award Gold Medal, the 2009 Financial Times and Goldman Sachs Business Book of the Year Award.

== Early life and education ==
Liaquat Ahamed was born in Kenya, where his grandfather had emigrated to from Gujarat, India, by way of Zanzibar in the late 19th century. He was educated at Rugby School in England, at Trinity College, Cambridge, where he earned a bachelor's degree in economics, and at Harvard University, where he earned a master's degree in economics.

== Career ==
Ahamed worked at the World Bank in Washington D.C., where he headed the bank's investment division, and at the New York-based partnership of Fischer Francis Trees & Watts, a fixed-income business and subsidiary of BNP Paribas, where he served as Chief Investment Officer and from 2001 to 2004 as CEO. From October 2007 he has been a director of Aspen Insurance Holdings. In addition he advises several hedge funds, including Rock Creek Group and The Rohatyn Group. As of 2010 he was a member of Board of Trustees at the Brookings Institution and involved with the New America Foundation.

Through his production company, Red Wine Pictures, Ahamed was a producer on the 2006 film The Situation, set in Iraq.

== Personal life ==
Ahamed comes from the Nizari Ismaili Shia sect, and he is a non-practising Muslim. His wife, Meenakshi "Meena" Singh, is an Indian freelance journalist who is active with Médecins Sans Frontières and other charitable organizations. Their daughter Tara is married to actor Jonathan Tucker.

== Works ==
- Economic Adjustment and Exchange Rates in Developing Countries. University of Chicago Press, 1986. Co-edited with Sebastian Edwards. ISBN 978-0226184692
- Lords of Finance: The Bankers Who Broke the World. Penguin Press, 2009. ISBN 978-1594201820
- Money and Tough Love: On Tour With the IMF. Visual Editions, 2014. ISBN 978-0956569271
- 1873: The Rothschilds, the First Great Depression, and the Making of the Modern World. Penguin Press, 2026. ISBN 978-1594204173, which deals with the Panic of 1873
