= The American War in Afghanistan: A History =

2021 book by Carter Malkasian

- Author: Carter Malkasian
- Language: English
- Genre: History
- Publisher: Oxford University Press
- Publication date: 2021
- Publication place: United Kingdom
- ISBN: 9780197550779

The American War in Afghanistan: A History is a nonfiction historical account of the United States war in Afghanistan between 2001 and 2020. It was written by Carter Malkasian and published in 2021 by Oxford University Press. In 2022 the author received the Lionel Gelber Prize for this book.

== Themes ==
This book is a comprehensive history of the war, arguing that one of the primary reasons for the Taliban's success was their deep connection to the religious and social identity of Afghanistan, and that the inability of the American-supported Afghan government to attract popular support and retain control of the country was due to Afghans’ viewing the American military as a foreign occupying power, writing, "The very presence of Americans in Afghanistan trod on what it meant to be Afghan… Any Afghan government, however good, however democratic, was going to be imperiled as long as it was aligned with the United States."

== See also ==
- Robert Gates, Duty: Memoirs of a Secretary at War, New York, Alfred A. Knopf, 2014.
- Ahmed Rashid, Taliban: Militant Islam, Oil and Fundamentalism in Central Asia, Yale University Press, 2000.
- Summers, Harry G, Jr. On Strategy: A Critical Analysis of the Vietnam War, Presidio Press, 1982
- Republican insurgency in Afghanistan
- Afghanistan conflict (1978–present)
