= Carter Malkasian =

American historian (born 1975)

Carter Malkasian (born 1975) is an American historian and the chair of the defense analysis department at the Naval Postgraduate School. He is a former adviser to American military commanders in Afghanistan.

== Career ==
Malkasian earned a doctorate in military history from the University of Oxford, where he studied under Robert O'Neill. After completing his studies, he became a teacher at Loyola Marymount University in Los Angeles. He then worked at the Center for Naval Analyses before spending time in Iraq conducting research in 2004 and 2006. In 2007, he worked with a Provincial Reconstruction Team in Kunar Province in Afghanistan. He returned to Afghanistan in 2009 and spent two years in Garmsir District in Helmand Province as a State Department representative to the district. In Garsmir, he was known for his ability to speak Pashto and his rejection of typical personal security precautions. From May 2013 to August 2014, he worked as a political adviser to General Joseph Dunford, the commander of the U.S. forces in Afghanistan.

== Works ==
In 2013, Malkasian published War Comes to Garmser: Thirty Years of Conflict on the Afghan Frontier. The book is modeled on Jeffrey Race's 1972 work War Comes to Long An, an analysis of the Vietnam War. The book is a history of conflict in Garmsir District from 1979 to 2012.

Illusions of Victory: The Anbar Awakening and the Rise of the Islamic State (2017) deals with the Anbar Awakening and the Iraq War troop surge of 2007, and attempts to explain why those events did not lead to lasting peace in Iraq.

The American War in Afghanistan: A History (2021) is a comprehensive history of the war, arguing that one of the primary reasons for the Taliban's success was their deep connection to the religious and social identity of Afghanistan, and that the inability of the American-supported Afghan government to attract popular support and retain control of the country was due to Afghans’ viewing the American military as a foreign occupying power, writing, “The very presence of Americans in Afghanistan trod on what it meant to be Afghan. . . . Any Afghan government, however good, however democratic, was going to be imperiled as long as it was aligned with the United States.”

== See also ==
- David Kilcullen, counterinsurgency expert and adviser to commanders in Iraq and Afghanistan
- Emma Sky, political adviser to U.S. commanders in Iraq
