= H-Soz-Kult =

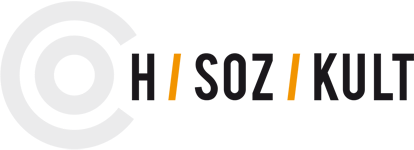

H-Soz-u-Kult (Humanities – Sozial und Kulturgeschichte) is an online information and communication platform for historians which disseminates academic news and publications.

The project is committed to the principles of open access and community network. Since its founding in 1996 the central editorial office is located at the History Department of the Humboldt University of Berlin. H-Soz-u-Kult is part of H-Net and one of the most important online communication and information services for Historians in the German-speaking world. It is read by more than 20,000 email subscribers in over 70 countries. In 2012, around one million page views by up to 210,000 unique visitors were registered per month on the website.

H-Soz-u-Kult publishes a wide range of book reviews, conference reports, job offers, scholarships, tables of contents of academic journals, literature reports and other news from the historical science community. Most publications are in German but the number of English publications continually increases. The book reviews are the main emphasis of H-Soz-u-Kult – more than 12,000 reviews were accessible on its website in 2013. H-Soz-u-Kult’s main editorial office at the Humboldt University of Berlin is supported by a pro bono editorial staff which consists of over 40 researchers from almost all fields of historical science.

H-Soz-u-Kult is a part of Clio-online, a partner in a wide range of other academic projects, and was supported by the German Research Foundation for many years. The editorial range has been augmented with contributions from the complementary forums history.transnational and zeitgeschichte-online since 2004 and infoclio.ch since 2009.

Current articles from the academic world can be accessed via H-Soz-u-Kult’s website, email and RSS-feeds.

H-Soz-u-Kult is the official media partner of the German Union of Historians.
