= On Strategy: A Critical Analysis of the Vietnam War =

1982 book by Harry G. Summers Jr.

- 1995 Book cover
- Author: Harry G.Summers, Jr.
- Subject: Strategy; United States; Vietnam War 1961-1975
- Genre: Non-fiction
- Published: 1982
- Publisher: Presidio Press
- Publication place: United States
- Media type: Print, E-book, Audio
- Pages: 225
- ISBN: 9780891415633 9780891411567
- OCLC: 42207737
- Website: Official website

On Strategy: A Critical Analysis of the Vietnam War is a nonfiction book, assessing what went wrong with United States strategy during the Vietnam War. It was published in 1982 by Presidio Press, and written with the benefit of hindsight by Harry G. Summers Jr. Summers was a U.S. Army veteran of both the Korean and Vietnam war, and he later retired as a United States Army Colonel.

== Synopsis ==
Summers says that despite the United States' military achievements in the Vietnam War, it was consistently on the defensive strategically. He also says that the U.S. lacked a comprehensive war plan and relied solely on a military tactical approaches, along with grand tactics. Hence, Summers analyzes the war through the lens of Carl von Clausewitz's military theories and his principles of war, finding that the U.S. neglected or lost sight of nearly all of them, at one time or another throughout the war. Conversely, the North Vietnamese adhered to these principles and ultimately achieved victory.

=== Civilian obstacles ===
Summers's text reveals several individuals and factors that contributed to the outcome of this war. President Johnson, was known for having a disdain for the military and he decided to prioritize domestic policies, such as his "Great Society" programs over the war effort. Also, Johnson did not seek, nor did Congress provide, a formal declaration of war. Additionally, his administration did not mobilize public support, which hindered the ability of the United States to achieve its goals, and which led to a lack of clarity of purpose in executing its war aims.

Also, according to Summers, during the war, the United States Department of Defense's bureaucracy was more concerned with global threats like the Soviet Union and communist China, and the management of nuclear weapons. Hence, this department prioritized Systems Analysis and the budgeting of military materials and equipment during the Vietnam War. These systems, while effective for planning for war, were not well-suited for the actual conduct of the conflict. The author also argues that the press, draft dodgers, and antiwar groups acted as expected within the political "vacuum" created by the President and Congress. He suggests that there was no decline in American national resolve because it had never been fully committed, nor fully engaged, to the war in the first place.

=== U.S. military obstacles ===
Part 2 of this book analyzes the role of the military. According to Summers, the military side emerges every bit as guilty as the political side, not so much by commission, but by omission. It was the military, more than any other institution, that should have been acutely aware that the United States was in constant violation of the teachings of Clausewitz and the Principles of War. But the Joint Chiefs of Staff Chairman did not use his direct access to the President to insist on declaring war and mobilizing the national will.

Also, according to Summers, the military leadership in Vietnam opposed the idea of a unified command, despite its proven effectiveness. Instead of insisting on their own strategies, they allowed civilians to dominate military planning due to bureaucratic pressure. They prioritized political goals, such as nation-building in the south, over military objectives against the real enemy in the north. They believed that the development of nuclear weapons had made traditional military concepts, like those of Clausewitz and historical lessons, less applicable to the war in Vietnam

== About the book ==
Beginning in 1982, this book has been published and distributed as a paperback throughout the U.S. Army and the Defense establishment. It has also been used as a student text at the Army War College, the Army Command and General Staff College, and the Marine Corp Amphibious Warfare School.

The layout of the book includes a "Foreword" by Major General USA Jack Meritt. This is followed by an introductory chapter entitled "Tactical victory, strategic defeat." Then the book is divided into two parts. Part one is entitled "The Environment." Part two is entitled "The Engagement." There is also an "Epilogue", an Appendix, a Selected Bibliography section, an Index, and a "Biographical Note".
