= Jason Stearns =

American writer (born 1976)

Jason K. Stearns
- Born: October 31, 1976 (age 50); San Francisco, California
- Education: Amherst College Yale University
- Spouse: Lusungu Kayani
- Writing career
- Notable works: Dancing in the Glory of Monsters: The Collapse of the Congo and the Great War of Africa, The War That Doesn't Say Its Name

Jason K. Stearns (born October 31, 1976) is an American writer who worked for ten years in the Congo, including three years during the Second Congo War. He first traveled to the Congo in 2001 to work for a local human rights organization, Héritiers de la Justice, in Bukavu. He went on to work for the United Nations peacekeeping mission (MONUC). In 2008 Stearns was named by the UN Secretary General to lead a special UN investigation into the violence in the country.

Stearns is the author of the book, Dancing in the Glory of Monsters: The Collapse of the Congo and the Great War of Africa, and the blog, Congo Siasa. He received a Ph.D. in political science from Yale University on May 24, 2016.

== Biography ==
Jason Stearns was born in San Francisco in 1976 to Stephen C. Stearns, an evolutionary biologist, and Beverly Peterson Stearns, a journalist. He has an older brother, Justin, who is professor of Middle Eastern history at New York University.

At the age of six, the family moved to Switzerland, where Stephen Stearns taught biology at the University of Basel. Stearns attended Swiss public school in Arlesheim and Muenchenstein, on the outskirts of Basel, and spent a year in Laja, Chile, on an exchange program. Upon graduation from Gymnasium Muenchenstein, he volunteered at the Swiss Tropical Institute's field research station in Ifakara, Tanzania.

In 1997, Jason joined his older brother in the United States, attending first Hampshire College and then neighboring Amherst College in Massachusetts. He graduated with a degree in political science. Having been accepted to law school at Harvard Law School, he traveled to Bukavu in the eastern Democratic Republic of the Congo to volunteer with Héritiers de la Justice, a local human rights group in September 2001. Deferring law school, he went on to work for the International Human Rights Law Group and the United Nations peacekeeping operation MONUC for the following two years. He eventually decided not to attend law school, enrolling in a PhD program in political science at Yale University in 2009.

Between 2005 and 2007, Stearns was based in Nairobi, Kenya, as a senior analyst for the International Crisis Group, working on the Democratic Republic of the Congo, Rwanda and Burundi. In 2007, he left to spend a year and a half researching and writing Dancing in the Glory of Monsters, a history of the Congo wars of 1996–2003, based on interviews with leading protagonists of the conflict. The title stems from a speech given by Congolese President Laurent Kabila in which he castigates Congolese for blaming their woes on a few political leaders, suggesting that the political malaise in the country is a more systemic problem. The book, which was eventually published in 2011, received critical acclaim in major newspapers and magazines.

In 2008, Stearns was named as coordinator of the United Nations Group of Experts on the Congo, a panel responsible for researching support and financing of armed groups in the eastern Democratic Republic of the Congo. In their final report, the Group found both the Rwandan and Congolese governments guilty of violating United Nations sanctions. According to eyewitness testimony, phone records and other documentary evidence, the Rwandan government had provided military support to the National Congress for the Defense of the People (CNDP) rebel group, while the Congolese government had collaborated with the Democratic Forces for the Liberation of Rwanda (FDLR) rebels, as well as other Congolese armed groups.

Following the report, the Swedish and Dutch government temporarily suspended aid to the Rwandan government. Several months after the publication of the report, the Rwandan government arrested the leader of the CNDP, Laurent Nkunda, and struck a peace deal with the Congolese government.

In 2010, Stearns married Lusungu Kayani, a Tanzanian-American employee of the United Nations and a fashion and textile entrepreneur.

== Writings ==
=== Books ===
- Dancing in the Glory of Monsters: The Collapse of the Congo and the Great War of Africa. New York: Public Affairs, 2011. ISBN 978-1-58648-929-8
- The War That Doesn't Say Its Name: The Unending Conflict in the Congo. Princeton: Princeton University Press, 2021. ISBN 978-0-69122-452-7

=== Articles ===
- Congo's Shocking Sexual Violence, The Daily Beast, October 17, 2010.
