= Jeffrey Race =

Jeffrey Race is the author of War Comes to Long An, originally published in 1972 and re-published with additional material in 2010. The book is based on his interviews with Vietnamese and Vietnamese documents, both government and communist, in Long An province in what was then South Vietnam. Described as a "military classic", Race attempted to answer the question of why one side in the Vietnam War could better motivate its followers than the other. His conclusion was that by 1965, before the large scale introduction of American military forces into the war, the communist Viet Cong had already won the battle of "Hearts and Minds".

== Life ==
Race grew up in Fairfield County, Connecticut and attended Harvard University from 1961 to 1965, majoring in government. In June 1965, he was commissioned as a 2nd Lieutenant in the U.S. Army's Signal Corps. He served with the army in Vietnam from October 1965 to June 1967. The first year he was a signals officer, and the second year he was on a U.S. military advisory team in Xuyen Moc District of Phuoc Tuy province, 60 miles (97 km) east of Saigon. During the nearly two years he spent as a military officer in South Vietnam, Race learned to speak and read the Vietnamese language.

Race returned to South Vietnam in July 1967 as an independent researcher and spent nearly one year in Long An province and Saigon collecting data from interviews and South Vietnamese and communist documents. In mid-1968, he was hired by the Advanced Research Projects Agency (ARPA) to work in Thailand. In 1969, he returned to the United States to complete a PhD at Harvard utilizing the material he had gathered in South Vietnam. Race lived in Thailand for most of the subsequent years, self-employed as an adviser to the U.S. military and American companies doing business in Southeast Asia.

The precursor to War Comes to Long An was Race's 1970 article titled "How They Won" which summarized the findings he would present two years later in the book. The article—especially the provocative title five years before North Vietnam defeated South Vietnam—engendered for Race an invitation to a Department of Defense seminar titled "lessons learned in pacification." He walked out of the seminar because the chairman refused to discuss "theoretical" conclusions. Race described the experience as "crimestop."

== War Comes to Long An ==
Long An province is important because it extends from the suburbs of Saigon westwards to the Cambodian border. In War Comes to Long An Race said the victory by early 1965 of communist revolutionaries in Long An was "the comprehensive view of revolution as a stage-by-stage social process by the communist leadership." He identified three categories of differences important in explaining why the South Vietnamese government lost control of Long An: strategic differences, organizational differences, and policy differences. The communists attempted to gain a "superiority of forces"—people willing to take risks to further the communist agenda—over the government.

Race makes the point that the communist victory in Long An was accomplished primarily in the pre-military phase (before 1960) of the Vietnam War by gaining the support of landless, poor, and middle-class peasants. This was accomplished through decisions at the village level on matters such as taxation, justice, and land redistribution. By contrast, the government was reactive, inflexible, and slow in carrying out rural reforms. The poor and landless peasants were, according to Race, "far better off economically under the policies of the revolutionary movement" than they had been under the government. Only a few—26 in 1960—assassinations of opponents and government officials were needed to "cripple the government apparatus at the village and hamlet level.

Race identifies the policies of the South Vietnamese government as "looking down" and that of the communists as "looking up." The government consisted of "outsiders", dictated from above, offered little promotion potential for rural and local leaders, and excluded most people from consideration for positions of influence and power. By contrast, the communists focused on recruiting their followers from the lowest social and economic classes and promoted the most promising to leadership positions. Government policy was to avoid appointing local people to positions of importance in the province, appointing outsiders instead, and not allowing soldiers to serve in the province of their birth. Communist policy was the opposite. Evasion of being drafted into the South Vietnamese army was common. Draft evaders were the core of the anti-government military forces formed late in 1959. The soldiers recruited by the communists were assured that they could remain near their homes, rather than being sent to a distant province of South Vietnam.

Race also identifies the incentives available to a communist supporter as superior to those of a government supporter. Government programs to aid the rural areas were focused on creating "a general increment of wealth or income." Thus, whatever benefit they received, those on the lower rungs of the economic and social ladder were going to remain there. The communist offered instead "contingent incentives"—rewards to individuals contingent on certain kinds of behavior such as joining the communist military forces and participating in political activity. The communist incentives motivated people to take a more active part in the organization and greater risks than the incentives available to government supporters who did not belong to the upper strata of society. The Communist Party structured its appeal by relating to the "social fabric of rural communities by ties of family, friendship, and common interest."

Race concluded his analysis by stating that the communist victory in Long An was not inevitable, but furthered by the lack of understanding of the revolutionary movement by the South Vietnamese government and its foreign advisers, mostly Americans. The government did not perceive nor consider alternative strategies to meet the decline in its control of many of the rural provinces of South Vietnam. Race found the U.S. government interested but not responsive to the results of his analysis. In a 1971 Department of Defense seminar he was told that the only appropriate subject to be discussed was how to make existing programs more effective, not to take into account the fact that the programs may have been ill-conceived and counter-productive.

Despite Race's contention that neither South Vietnam nor the United States understood the roots of the communist insurgency, he attempted to avoid moral judgments and maintain objectivity. He portrays both government officials and insurgents as people "trying to do what they thought was right at a certain point in time."
