= Dancing in the Glory of Monsters =

2011 non-fiction book

Dancing in the Glory of Monsters: The Collapse of the Congo and the Great War of Africa
- Author: Jason Stearns
- Publisher: PublicAffairs
- Publication date: 2011
- ISBN: 978-1-58648-929-8
- OCLC: 781709203

Dancing in the Glory of Monsters: The Collapse of the Congo and the Great War of Africa is a non-fiction book by American author Jason Stearns, published by PublicAffairs in 2011. It is about the First and Second Congo Wars, focusing especially on the role the Rwandan government played in the Democratic Republic of the Congo's internal affairs during the 1990s and early 2000s.

== Reception ==
Reviews for the book were generally positive. In a The New York Times review, Adam Hochschild compared it favourably to other books about the conflict, describing it as "more lucid and accessible than its nearest competitor". He also noted that Stearns, while still critical of the Rwandan government's involvement in the Congo, was "easier" on the country than Stearns had been in his other works. In African Affairs, Zach Warner is slightly more critical, describing the book's focus as "narrow". However, Warner also stated that the book was "accessible", and praised it for its ability to appeal to "non-specialists". A review by Robert Guest, published in the Washington Post, described the book as a "tour de force". In particular, Guest noted the interview published in the book between Stearns and a Congolese officer who had been a member of a death squad. The officer's death squad had been in charge of killing women and children.

== Awards ==
Dancing in the Glory of Monsters won the silver medal in the 2012 Arthur Ross Book Awards.
