= Jill Lepore =

American historian (born 1966)

- Jill Lepore at the Frankfurt Book Fair 2026
- Born: August 27, 1966 (age 60); West Boylston, Massachusetts, U.S.
- Children: 3
- Awards: Bancroft Prize (1999); Pulitzer Prize (2026)

Academic background
- Education: Tufts University (BA); University of Michigan (MA); Yale University (PhD)

Academic work
- Institutions: Harvard University; Boston University; University of California, San Diego
- Website: jilllepore.com

Jill Lepore (born 1966) is an American historian and journalist. She is the David Woods Kemper '41 Professor of American History at Harvard University and a staff writer at The New Yorker, where she has contributed since 2005. She writes about American history, law, literature, and politics.

Her essays and reviews have also appeared in The New York Times, The Times Literary Supplement, The Journal of American History, Foreign Affairs, the Yale Law Journal, The American Scholar, and the American Quarterly.

Four of her books derive from her New Yorker essays: The Mansion of Happiness: A History of Life and Death (2012), a finalist for the Carnegie Medal for Excellence in Nonfiction; The Story of America: Essays on Origins (2012), shortlisted for the PEN Literary Award for the Art of the Essay; The Whites of Their Eyes: The Tea Party's Revolution and the Battle for American History (2010); and This America: The Case for the Nation (2019), which was based both on a 2018 New Yorker essay of the same name, and her 2019 essay "A New Americanism" for Foreign Affairs.

In 2026, her book We the People: A History of the U.S. Constitution was awarded the Pulitzer Prize for History.

== Early life and education ==
Jill Lepore was born in 1966, and grew up in West Boylston, a small town outside Worcester, Massachusetts. Her father was a junior high school principal and her mother was an art teacher. Her paternal grandparents were Italian immigrants from Abruzzo and Naples.

Lepore had no early desire to become a historian and wanted to be a writer from the age of six.

She participated in Reserve Officers' Training Corps (ROTC) at Tufts University, where she began as a math major. Eventually she left ROTC and changed her major to English. She earned her B.A. in English after three years in 1987.

After graduating from Tufts, Lepore had a temporary job working as a secretary at the Harvard Business School before returning to school. She received an M.A. in American culture from the University of Michigan in 1990 and a Ph.D. in American Studies from Yale University in 1995, where she specialized in the history of early America.

== Career ==
Lepore taught at the University of California, San Diego from 1995 to 1996 and at Boston University beginning in 1996; she started at Harvard in 2003. Her first book, The Name of War, was about King Phillip's War and its legacy; it was published in 1998 and was awarded the Bancroft Prize. In addition to her books and articles on history, in 2008 Lepore published a historical novel, Blindspot, co-written with Jane Kamensky, then a history professor at Brandeis University and later Professor of History and Pforzheimer Foundation Director of the Schlesinger Library at Harvard University. Previously, Lepore and Kamensky had co-founded an online history journal called Common-place. Lepore is now a history professor at Harvard University, where she holds an endowed chair and teaches American political history. She focuses on missing evidence in historical records and articles.

Lepore gathers historical evidence that allows scholars to study and analyze political processes and behaviors. Her articles are often both historical and political. She has said, "History is the art of making an argument about the past by telling a story accountable to evidence."

Lepore has been contributing to The New Yorker since 2005. In the June 23, 2014, issue she criticized the concept of creative destruction, associated with Austrian-born political economist Joseph Schumpeter. The response of one of those whose work she discusses, fellow Harvard professor Clayton Christensen, was that her article was "a criminal act of dishonesty—at Harvard, of all places".

From 2011 to 2013, Lepore was a visiting scholar of Phi Beta Kappa society. She has delivered the Theodore H. White Lecture on the Press and Politics at Harvard Kennedy School (2015), the John L. Hatfield Lecture at Lafayette College (2015), the Lewis Walpole Library Lecture at Yale (2013), the Harry F. Camp Memorial Lecture at Stanford (2013), the University of Kansas Humanities Lecture (2013), the Joanna Jackson Goldman Memorial Lectures at the New York Public Library (2012), the Kephardt Lecture at Villanova (2011), the Stafford-Little Lecture at Princeton (2010), and the Walker Horizon Lecture at DePauw (2009). She is the president of the Society of American Historians and an Emeritus Commissioner of the Smithsonian's National Portrait Gallery. She has been a consultant and contributor to documentary and public history projects. Her three-part story "The Search for Big Brown" was broadcast on The New Yorker Radio Hour in 2015.

In February 2022, Lepore was one of 38 Harvard faculty to sign a letter to The Harvard Crimson defending Professor John Comaroff, who had been found to have violated the university's sexual and professional conduct policies. The letter defended Comaroff as "an excellent colleague, advisor and committed university citizen" and expressed dismay over his being sanctioned by the university. After students filed a lawsuit with detailed allegations of Comaroff's actions and the university's failure to respond, Lepore was one of several signatories to say that she wished to retract her signature.

== Selected awards and honors ==
- 1998 Elected member of the American Antiquarian Society
- 1998 Ralph Waldo Emerson Award of Phi Beta Kappa society for The Name of War
- 1999 Bancroft Prize for The Name of War
- 2006 Anisfield-Wolf Book Award (nonfiction) for New York Burning
- 2014 Elected fellow of the American Academy of Arts and Sciences
- 2014 Mark Lynton History Prize for Book of Ages: The Life and Opinions of Jane Franklin
- 2014 Elected to the American Philosophical Society
- 2015 American History Book Prize for The Secret History of Wonder Woman
- 2021 Hannah Arendt Prize for Political Thought
- 2026 Pulitzer Prize for History for We the People: A History of the U.S. Constitution

== Publications ==
- The Name of War: King Philip's War and the Origins of American Identity. New York: Alfred A. Knopf. 1998. ISBN 978-0-679-44686-6.
- Encounters in the New World: A History in Documents. New York: Oxford University Press. 2000. ISBN 978-0-19-510513-1.
- A Is for American: Letters and Other Characters in the Newly United States. New York: Alfred A. Knopf. 2002. ISBN 978-0-375-40449-8.
- New York Burning: Liberty, Slavery, and Conspiracy in Eighteenth-century Manhattan. New York: Alfred A. Knopf. 2005. ISBN 978-1-4000-4029-2.
- The Whites of Their Eyes: The Tea Party's Revolution and the Battle Over American History. Princeton, N.J.: Princeton University Press. 2010. ISBN 978-0-691-15027-7.
- The Mansion of Happiness: A History of Life and Death. New York: Alfred A. Knopf. 2012. ISBN 978-0-307-59299-6.
- The Story of America: Essays on Origins. Princeton, N.J.: Princeton University Press. 2012. ISBN 978-0-691-15399-5.
- Book of Ages: The Life and Opinions of Jane Franklin. New York: Alfred A. Knopf. 2013. ISBN 978-0-307-95834-1.
- The Secret History of Wonder Woman. New York: Alfred A. Knopf. 2014. ISBN 978-0-385-35404-2.
- Joe Gould's Teeth. New York: Alfred A. Knopf. 2016. ISBN 978-1-101-94758-6.
- These Truths: A History of the United States. New York: W. W. Norton & Company. 2018. ISBN 978-0-393-63524-9.
- This America: The Case for the Nation. New York: Liveright. 2019. ISBN 978-1-63149-641-7.
- If Then: How the Simulmatics Corporation Invented the Future. New York: Liveright. 2020. ISBN 978-1-63149-611-0.
- The Deadline. New York: Liveright. 2023. ISBN 978-1-63149-612-7.
- We the People: A History of the U.S. Constitution. New York: Liveright. 2025. ISBN 978-1-63149-608-0.
- The Rise and Fall of the Artificial State. Liveright. 2026. ISBN 978-1-324-09842-3.

== See also ==
- Popular history – Genre of historiography
