= M. E. Sarotte =

American historian (born 1968)

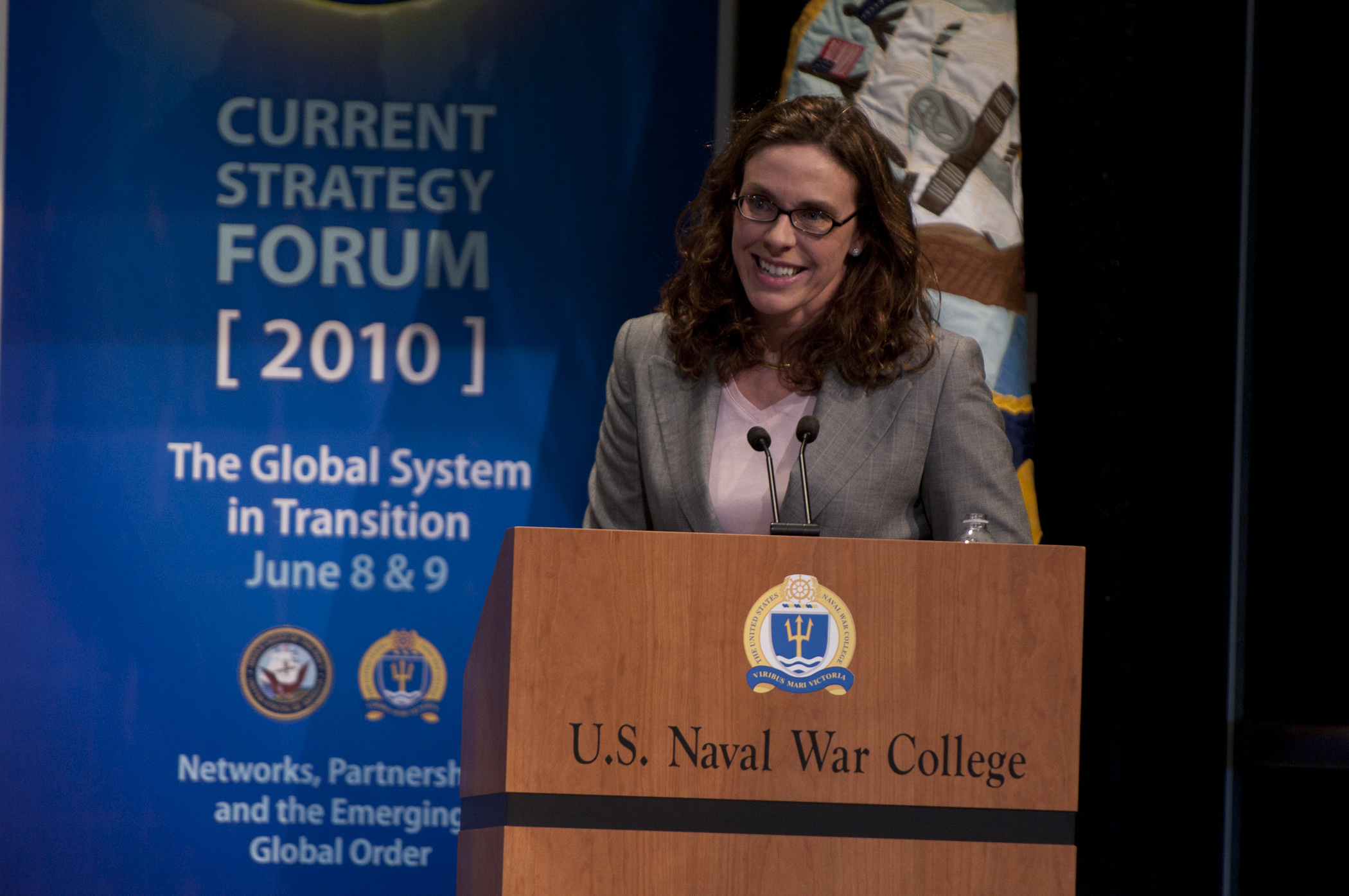
- Sarotte in 2010
- Born: 1968 (age 57–58)
- Education: Harvard University (AB); Yale University (PhD)
- Occupation: Historian
- Notable work: Not One Inch

Mary Elise Sarotte (born 1968) is an American historian of the post–Cold War era. She was the Marie-Josée and Henry R. Kravis Distinguished Professor of Historical Studies at the Henry A. Kissinger Center for Global Affairs, which is part of Johns Hopkins University. She is now the Director of the Brady-Johnson Program in Grand Strategy and Professor of Global Affairs and Management at Yale University.

Sarotte earned an AB in history and science from Harvard University, and a PhD in history at Yale University. Her book Not One Inch was shortlisted for the 2022 Cundill History Prize.

== Bibliography ==
External videos
- Presentation by Sarotte on The Collapse, November 24, 2014, C-SPAN
- Presentation by Sarotte on Not One Inch, February 4, 2022, C-SPAN
- Q&A interview with Sarotte on Not One Inch, April 17, 2022, C-SPAN

- Dealing with the Devil: East Germany, Détente, and Ostpolitik, 1969-1973. University of North Carolina Press. 2001.
- "'Take No Risks (Chinese)': The Basic Treaty in the context of international relations". Bulletin of the German Historical Institute. Supplement 1: 109–117. 2004.
- 1989: The Struggle to Create Post–Cold War Europe (Second Edition). Princeton: Princeton University Press, 2014.
- Collapse: The Accidental Opening of the Berlin Wall. New York: Basic Books, 2014.
- German Reunification: A Multinational History, eds. Frédéric Bozo, Andreas Rödder, and Mary Elise Sarotte (New York: Routledge, 2017).
- Not One Inch: America, Russia, and the Making of Post–Cold War Stalemate. Yale University Press, 2021.
