= Ahmed Rashid =

Pakistani journalist and writer (born 1948)

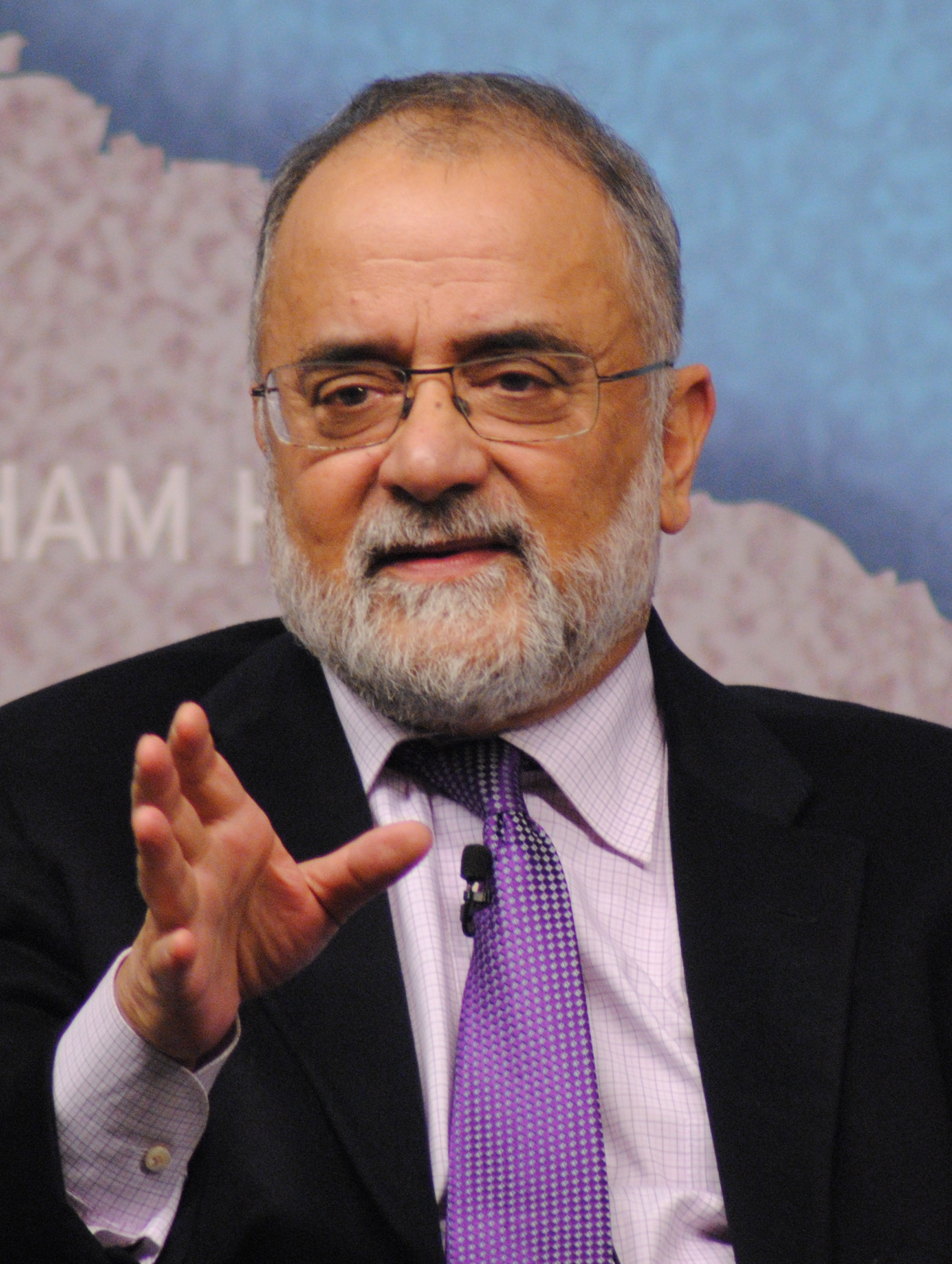
- Rashid speaking at a Chatham House event in January 2014
- Born: 1948 (age 76–77); Rawalpindi, Pakistan
- Occupation(s): Journalist, author

Ahmed Rashid (Urdu:احمد رشید; born 1948 in Rawalpindi) is a Pakistani journalist and best-selling foreign policy author of several books about Afghanistan, Pakistan, and Central Asia.

== Life and career ==
Rashid was born in Rawalpindi, Pakistan. He attended Malvern College, England, Government College Lahore, and Fitzwilliam College, Cambridge at Cambridge University in the late 1960s.

After graduating, Rashid spent ten years in the hills of Balochistan, attempting to organise an uprising against the Pakistani military dictatorships of Ayub Khan and Yahya Khan. He ended his guerrilla fighting days frustrated and defeated and turned his attention to writing about his homeland.

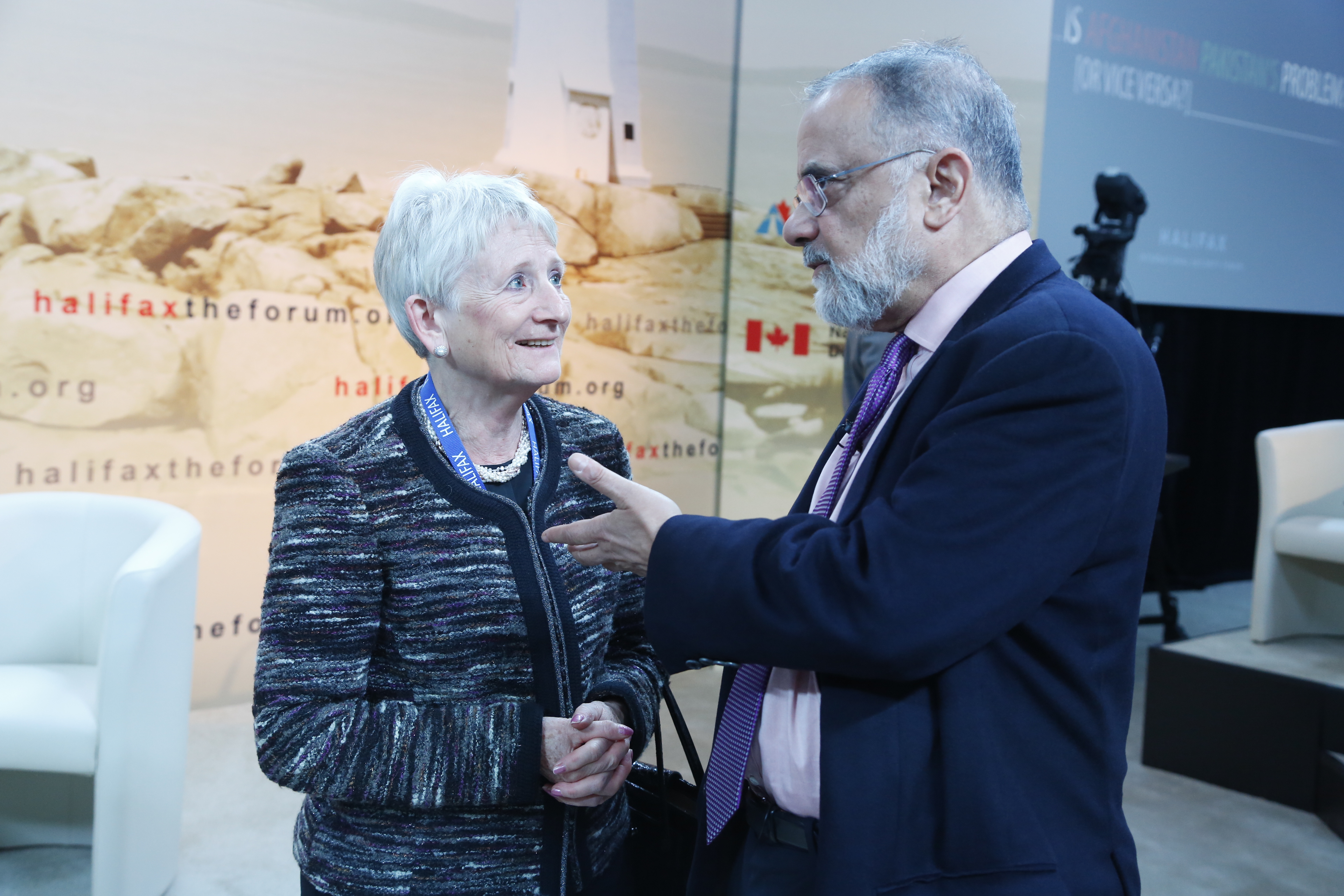
Rashid and Pauline Neville-Jones at the Halifax International Security Forum

He has been the Pakistan, Afghanistan and Central Asia Correspondent for The Daily Telegraph for more than 20 years and a correspondent for Far Eastern Economic Review. He also writes for The Wall Street Journal, The Nation, Daily Times (Pakistan) and academic journals. He appears regularly on international TV channels and radio networks such as CNN, BBC World and many Pakistani TV channels. Rashid is often sought after for advice by diplomats in Islamabad and Kabul, and by policy makers in NATO capitals and Washington."

He is a well known and vocal critic of the Bush administration in relation to the Iraq war and its alleged neglect of the Taliban issue. Rashid's 2000 book, Taliban: Militant Islam, Oil and Fundamentalism in Central Asia, was a New York Times bestseller for five weeks, translated into 22 languages, and has sold 1.5 million copies since the September 11, 2001 attacks, "an astonishing number for an academic press." The book was used extensively by American analysts in the wake of the 9/11 attacks. Rashid charged that former president George W. Bush plagiarized his work in writing his memoirs.

His commentary also appears in The Washington Post's Post Global segment. "Rashid is a regular columnist for leading national and international publications and a frequent guest on NPR's (National Public Radio) Fresh Air."

"An expert on the Taliban -- until 9/11 he knew them better than almost any outsider -- Mr. Rashid has over the decades turned out to be something of a prophet in the region, though mostly of the Cassandra type, issuing repeated warnings that are ignored by policy makers."

Ahmed Rashid is married with two children and lives in Lahore, Punjab, Pakistan.

== Selected works ==
- The Resurgence of Central Asia: Islam or Nationalism?, St. Martin's Press (May 1994), ISBN 1-85649-131-5.
- Taliban: Militant Islam, Oil and Fundamentalism in Central Asia, Yale University Press (March 2000) ISBN 0-300-08340-8.
- Jihad: The Rise of Militant Islam in Central Asia, Yale University Press (January 25, 2002) ISBN 0-300-09345-4. (Hyderabad: Orient Longman, 2002)
- Descent into Chaos: The United States and the Failure of Nation Building in Pakistan, Afghanistan, and Central Asia, Viking, 2008, ISBN 978-0-670-01970-0.
- Taliban: The Power of Militant Islam in Afghanistan and Beyond, 2nd ed, I.B.Tauris (April 2010), ISBN 978-1-84885-446-8
- Pakistan on the Brink: The Future of America, Pakistan, and Afghanistan, Viking Adult (March 15, 2012), ISBN 978-0-670-02346-2.

== See also ==
- The Great Game
- The Oil Factor
