= The Shield of Achilles: War, Peace, and the Course of History =

2002 book by Philip Bobbitt

- The first US edition
- Author: Philip Bobbitt
- Cover artist: James Thornhill Thetis Accepting the Shield of Achilles from Vulcan - c. 1710
- Language: English
- Genre: Social Sciences
- Publisher: Knopf US; Allen Lane (UK)
- Publication date: 2002
- Publication place: United States
- Media type: Print (hardback)
- Pages: 922
- ISBN: 978-0-7139-9616-6

The Shield of Achilles: War, Peace, and the Course of History is a historico-philosophical work by Philip Bobbitt. It was first published in 2002 by Alfred Knopf in the US and Penguin in the UK.

== Theses ==
The work consists of two volumes, each written in three parts. Each part is preceded by a thesis.

== Book I ==
=== Book I, Part One ===
The War that Began in 1914 will come to be seen as having lasted until 1990. Thus this Part introduces the idea of an "epochal war', a historical construction that embraces several conflicts thought to be separate wars by the participants, and the notion of the "Long War", a conflict which embraces the First and Second World Wars, the Bolshevik Revolution, the Spanish Civil War, the Korean and Vietnam wars and the Cold War.

Epochal wars, like the Long War or the Thirty Years War or the Peloponnesian War, are fought over a constitutional issue. In the case of the Long War the issue was: which sort of 20th century industrial nation state--fascist, communist or parliamentarian--would succeed to the legitimacy previously enjoyed by imperial state-nations in the 19th century.

=== Book I, Part Two ===
The interplay between strategic and constitutional innovation changes the constitutional order of the State. The relationship between strategy and law is such that any fundamental change in the nature of strategy will produce a fundamental change in law, and vice versa. There is no single, linear monocausal relationship between the two, but rather a mutually effecting circuit. Thus the French Revolution brought about the Napoleonic revolution in tactical and strategic affairs. The introduction of mobile artillery onto the Italian plain in the Renaissance brought about the first princely states. Epochal wars force the state to innovate—either strategically or constitutionally—and successful innovations by a single state are copied by other, competing states.

=== Book I, Part Three ===
The constitutional order of the 21st-century market state will supersede the 20th-century nation state as a consequence of the end of the Long War. A constitutional order is distinguished by its unique claim for legitimacy. Give us power, the nation state said, and we will improve your material well-being. The nation state, with its mass free public education, universal franchise, and social security policies promised to guarantee the welfare of the nation.

The market state promises to maximize the opportunity of the people, and thus tends to privatize many state activities. Voting and representative government will be less influential and more responsive to the market. This does not mean that market states cease to be interested in the well-being of their peoples or that nationalism is any less potent, but that the State no longer claims legitimacy on that unique basis.

== Book II ==
=== Book II, Part One ===
Book I focuses on the individual state. Book II takes up the society of states. The society of nation states developed a constitution that attempted to treat states as if they were individuals in apolitical society of equal, autonomous, rights-bearing citizens. This society, like all groups, has a constitution; its foundations were laid at the end of World War I, when nation states destroyed the imperial state nations of the preceding century. Perhaps the most important constitutional idea of this society is the right of self-determination of national peoples.

=== Book II, Part Two ===
Much as epochal wars have shaped the constitutional order of individual states, the great peace settlements of these wars have shaped the constitutional order of the society of states. The Treaty of Augsburg, the Peace of Westphalia, the Treaty of Utrecht, the Congress of Vienna, the Peace of Versailles, and the Peace of Paris all served to ratify the dominance of a new constitutional order and provide rules for the society of states.

=== Book II, Part Three ===
A new society of market states is being born. The challenges facing the society of states today are a direct consequence of the strategic innovations that won the Long War—the development of nuclear weapons, a global system of communications, and the technology of rapid computation. These have undermined the ability of any nation state to govern its economy; to assert its laws in the face of universal norms of human rights; to defend its territory against weapons of mass destruction; to tackle transnational problems like global warming, epidemics and terrorism; and to protect the national culture from outside influences. Market states will take up these challenges. Though there are, at present, no market states, it is speculated that they will come in at least three fundamentally different forms: mercantile, managerial, and entrepreneurial.

== The State ==
The Shield of Achilles puts the subject of the State back on the table for constitutional theorists and historians after a long period in which other subjects—rights, for example—had eclipsed its centrality. Originally the work, in lengthier versions, was divided into separate books that were intended to stand alone. Book I, State of War, describes a two-way, mutually affecting causal process that mediates between fundamental changes in the constitutional basis of society and deep innovations in its military strategy.

To the much-debated question of whether state formation was caused by the gunpowder revolution of the 17th century, by the development of more sophisticated fortresses in the 16th century, or the professionalization of armed forces in the 18th century, Bobbitt answers: all of the above. Rejecting the monolithic idea of the Westphalian nation state, he identifies five constitutional orders arising in tandem with strategic and technological innovation: princely states, kingly states, territorial states, state-nations, and nation states.

Book II, States of Peace, posits that the great peace congresses that sorted out the winners and losers of epochal wars wrote constitutions for the society of states and thus ratified each new constitutional order (Augsburg/princely state; Westphalia/kingly state; Utrecht/territorial state; Vienna/state nation; Versailles/nation state). This book ends with a suite of scenarios looking forward to the future development of societies of market states.

== Narrative organization ==
The sequence of chapters in both books of The Shield of Achilles follows the sequence of the novel Nostromo by Joseph Conrad—present, past, future. Somewhat more prosaically, this is the order of Statement of Facts, Statement of Law, and Holding in an Anglo-American judicial opinion. The first parts of Book I and Book II deal with 20th-century and contemporary events. The second parts of both books then flash back to the emergence of states in the 16th century and take the historical narrative up to the point where the first parts had begun.

The third part of each book addresses the future, beginning where the first parts left off. This methodical if unorthodox sequencing allows the historian to avoid the tempting mechanics of foreshadowing, emphasizing the possibilities of different outcomes at each stage, and deepening the understanding of how the past can liberate the present.

== Long War (20th century) ==
The Long War is the name Bobbitt proposed in The Shield of Achilles to describe the series of major conflicts fought from the start of the First World War in 1914 to the decline of the Soviet Union in 1990. As proposed by Bobbitt, the Long War includes the First World War, the Bolshevik Revolution, the Chinese Civil War, the Spanish Civil War, the Second World War, the Korean War, the Vietnam War, and the Cold War.

These wars were all fought over a single set of constitutional issues, to determine which form of constitution – liberal democracy, fascism or communism – would replace the colonial ideology of the imperial states of Europe that had emerged after the epochal Napoleonic Wars that had dominated the world between the Congress of Vienna and August 1914. Just as earlier epochal wars were resolved by major international settlements at Westphalia, Utrecht and Vienna, the Long War was resolved by the 1990 Charter of Paris for a New Europe.

Bobbitt's Long War follows a view of history understood as a series of epochal wars that have shaped both state constitutions and international relations. Bobbitt traces this perspective of military history via Thomas Hobbes and Niccolò Machiavelli to Thucydides. The Greek historian Thucydides, for example, identified the wars of the fifth century BC in the Hellenic world as a constitutional struggle between the hegemons Athens and Sparta, which he called the Peloponnesian War.

Eric Hobsbawm introduced a similar idea in The Age of Extremes (1994), where the period from 1914 to 1991 is called the short twentieth century. Alternate views on understanding conflicts during the same time period include the Second Thirty Years' War, which extends from 1914 to 1945 and includes both the First World War and the Second World War and so forms a subdivision within Bobbitt's Long War, and the European Civil War, which extends the beginning of the period to the Franco-Prussian War of 1870 but still concludes with the Second World War in 1945.

== Reception ==
The Shield of Achilles generated much interest in the diplomatic and political community. Public officials who followed Bobbitt's works included Prime Minister of the United Kingdom, Tony Blair, the Archbishop of Canterbury, Rowan Williams, who built his Dimbleby Lecture around Bobbitt's thesis, and the former United States Secretary of State Henry Kissinger.

The Shield of Achilles was the 2003 Grand Prize Winner of the Hamilton Awards and the Arthur Ross Book Award Bronze Medalist of the Council on Foreign Relations for Best Book in Foreign Policy of that year. British military historian Michael Howard wrote, The Shield of Achilles "will be one of the most important works on international relations published during the last fifty years".

Paul Kennedy, writing in The New York Review of Books argued that it may "become a classic for future generations." In contrast, Paul W. Schroeder, acknowledging that his view was "evidently a minority one," judged that the book is "error strewn," "suffers from grand delusions of theoretical adequacy," and "is unscholarly."
