= Taliban: Militant Islam, Oil and Fundamentalism in Central Asia =

2000 book by Ahmed Rashid

- 1st edition book cover
- Author: Ahmed Rashid
- Subject: Taliban. Islamic fundamentalism--Afghanistan. Islam and state--Afghanistan. Islam and politics--Afghanistan. Afghanistan--Politics and government--1973-
- Genre: Nonfiction
- Publisher: Yale University Press
- Publication date: 2000, 2010, 2022
- Publication place: U.S.A.
- Awards: New York Times bestseller
- ISBN: 9780300083408 9780300163681
- OCLC: 751430506
- Dewey Decimal: 958.104
- LC Class: DS371.2 .R367 2000
- Website: Yale University Press

Taliban: Militant Islam, Oil and Fundamentalism in Central Asia is an historical book written by Pakistani journalist Ahmed Rashid and published in 2000.
