= Lionel Gelber Prize =

English literary award

- Awarded for: "the world's best non-fiction book in English on foreign affairs that seeks to deepen public debate on significant international issues."
- Presented by: Lionel Gelber Prize Board
- Reward: CA$50,000
- First award: 1990

The Lionel Gelber Prize is a literary award for English non-fiction books on foreign policy. Founded in 1989 by Canadian diplomat Lionel Gelber, the prize honors "the world's best non-fiction book in English on foreign affairs that seeks to deepen public debate on significant international issues." A prize of CA$50,000, is awarded to the winner. The award is presented annually by the Munk School of Global Affairs & Public Policy at the University of Toronto.

Recipients are judged by an international jury of experts. In 1999, The Economist called the award "the world's most important award for non-fiction". Past winners have included, Lawrence Wright, Jonathan Spence, David McCullough, Kanan Makiya, Michael Ignatieff, Eric Hobsbawm, Robert Kinloch Massie, Adam Hochschild (a two-time winner), Robert Skidelsky, Baron Skidelsky, Walter Russell Mead, Chrystia Freeland, and Steve Coll.

== Lionel Gelber ==
Lionel Gelber was a Canadian author, scholar, historian, and diplomat. During his career, he wrote eight books and many articles on foreign relations, including The Rise of Anglo-American Friendship: a Study of World Politics 1898 to 1906, which examined the "rise of American global power, with all the risk, hope and complexity such a geopolitical shift entailed at the beginning of the 20th Century." He followed this work with Peace by Power: The Plain Man's Guide to the Key Issues of the War and the Post-War World in 1942 and America in Britain's Place in 1961. Gelber studied at Upper Canada College and the University of Toronto before winning the Rhodes Scholarship and beginning his studies at Balliol College, Oxford. In 1989, the Lionel Gelber prize was created to honor works published in Gelber's field.

== Recipients ==
Award winners
Year	Author	Title	Result	Ref.
1990	Jonathan D. Spence	The Search for Modern China	Winner	
1991	Dorothy V. Jones	Code of Peace: Ethics and Security in the World of Warlord States	Winner	
1992	David McCullough	Truman	Winner	
1993	Kanan Makiya	Cruelty and Silence: War, Tyranny, Uprising and the Arab World	Winner	
1994	Michael Ignatieff	Blood and Belonging: Journeys Into the New Nationalism	Winner	
1995	Eric Hobsbawm	The Age of Extremes: The Short 20th Century, 1914–1991	Winner	
1996	Vladislav Zubok and Constantine Pleshakov	Inside the Kremlin's Cold War: From Stalin to Khrushchev	Winner	
1997	Donovan Webster	Aftermath: The Remnants of War	Winner	
1998	Robert Kinloch Massie	Loosing the Bonds: The United States and South Africa In the Apartheid Years	Winner	
1999	Adam Hochschild	King Leopold's Ghost: A Story of Greed, Terror and Heroism In Colonial Africa	Winner	
2000	Patrick Tyler	A Great Wall: Six Presidents and China: An Investigative History	Winner	
2001	Robert Skidelsky	John Maynard Keynes, Fighting for Britain 1937-1946	Winner	
2002	Walter Russell Mead	Special Providence: American Foreign Policy and How It Changed the World	Winner	
2003	Ivo H. Daalder and James M. Lindsay	America Unbound: The Bush Revolution in Foreign Policy	Winner	
2004	Steve Coll	Ghost Wars: The Secret History of the CIA, Afghanistan, and Bin Laden, from the Soviet Invasion to September 10, 2001	Winner	
2006	Adam Hochschild	Bury the Chains: Prophets and Rebels in the Fight to Free an Empire's Slaves	Winner	
2007	Lawrence Wright	The Looming Tower: Al Qaeda and the Road to 9/11	Winner	
2008	Paul Collier	The Bottom Billion: Why the Poorest Countries Are Failing and What Can Be Done About It	Winner	
2009	Lawrence Freedman	A Choice of Enemies: America Confronts the Middle East	Winner	
2010	Jay Taylor	The Generalissimo: Chiang Kai-shek and the Struggle for Modern China	Winner	
2011	Shelagh Grant	Polar Imperative: A History of Arctic Sovereignty in North America	Winner	
2011	Serhii M. Plokhy	Yalta: The Price of Peace	Shortlist	
2011	Ian Morris	Why the West Rules—For Now	Shortlist	
2011	Doug Saunders	Arrival City: The Final Migration and our Next World	Shortlist	
2011	Nick Cullather	The Hungry World: America’s Cold War Battle Against Poverty in Asia	Shortlist	
2012	Ezra F. Vogel	Deng Xiaoping and the Transformation of China	Winner	
2012	Amanda Foreman	A World on Fire: Britain’s Crucial Role in the American Civil War	Shortlist	
2012	Frederick Kempe	Berlin 1961: Kennedy, Khrushchev, and the Most Dangerous Place on Earth	Shortlist	
2012	John Lewis Gaddis	George F. Kennan: An American Life	Shortlist	
2012	Henry Kissinger	On China	Shortlist	
2013	Chrystia Freeland	Plutocrats: The Rise of the New Global Super-Rich and the Fall of Everyone Else	Winner	
2013	Anne Applebaum	Iron Curtain: The Crushing of Eastern Europe 1944-1956	Shortlist	
2013	Paul Bracken	The Second Nuclear Age: Strategy, Danger, and the New Power Politics	Shortlist	
2013	Kwasi Kwarteng	Ghosts of Empire: Britain’s Legacies in the Modern World	Shortlist	
2013	Pankaj Mishra	From the Ruins of Empire: The Intellectuals Who Remade Asia	Shortlist	
2014	Gary J. Bass	The Blood Telegram: Nixon, Kissinger, and a Forgotten Genocide	Winner	
2014	Lynne Olson	Those Angry Days: Roosevelt, Lindbergh, and America’s Fight Over World War II, 1939—1941	Shortlist	
2014	Eric Schlosser	Command and Control: Nuclear Weapons, the Damascus Accident, and the Illusion of Safety	Shortlist	
2014	Brendan Simms	Europe: The Struggle for Supremacy, from 1453 to the Present	Shortlist	
2014	Benn Steil	The Battle of Bretton Woods: John Maynard Keynes, Harry Dexter White, and the Making of a New World Order	Shortlist	
2015	Serhii Plokhy	The Last Empire: The Final Days of the Soviet Union	Winner	
2016	Scott Shane	Objective Troy: A Terrorist, A President, and the Rise of the Drone	Winner	
2016	Barry Eichengreen	Hall of Mirrors: The Great Depression, the Great Recession, and the Uses – and Misuses – of History	Shortlist	
2016	Niall Ferguson	Kissinger 1923–1968: The Idealist	Shortlist	
2016	Dominic Lieven	The End of Tsarist Russia: The March to World War 1 & Revolution	Shortlist	
2016	Susan Pedersen	The Guardians: The League of Nations and the Crisis of Empire	Shortlist	
2017	Robert F. Worth	A Rage for Order: The Middle East in Turmoil, from Tahrir Square to ISIS	Winner	
2017	Rosa Brooks	How Everything Became War and the Military Became Everything: Tales from the Pentagon	Shortlist	
2017	Shadi Hamid	Islamic Exceptionalism: How the Struggle Over Islam Is Reshaping the World	Shortlist	
2017	Arkady Ostrovsky	The Invention of Russia: From Gorbachev's Freedom to Putin's War	Shortlist	
2017	Laura Secor	Children of Paradise: The Struggle for the Soul of Iran	Shortlist	
2018	Anne Applebaum	Red Famine: Stalin's War on Ukraine	Winner	
2018	Graham Allison	Destined for War: Can America and China Escape Thucydides’s Trap?	Shortlist	
2018	Lawrence Freedman	The Future of War: A History	Shortlist	
2018	Oona A. Hathaway and Scott J. Shapiro	The Internationalists: How a Radical Plan to Outlaw War Remade the World	Shortlist	
2018	Richard McGregor	Asia’s Reckoning: China, Japan, and the Fate of U.S. Power in the Pacific Century	Shortlist	
2019	Adam Tooze	Crashed: How a Decade of Financial Crises Changed the World	Winner	
2019	Rania Abouzeid	No Turning Back: Life, Loss, and Hope in Wartime Syria	Shortlist	
2019	Elizabeth C. Economy	The Third Revolution: Xi Jinping and the New Chinese State	Shortlist	
2019	Steven Levitsky and Daniel Ziblatt	How Democracies Die	Shortlist	
2019	Timothy Snyder	The Road to Unfreedom: Russia, Europe, America	Shortlist	
2020	Ivan Krastev and Stephen Holmes	The Light that Failed: A Reckoning	Winner	
2021	Matthew C. Klein and Michael Pettis	Trade Wars Are Class Wars: How Rising Inequality Distorts the Global Economy and Threatens International Peace	Winner	
2022	Carter Malkasian	The American War in Afghanistan: A History	Winner	
2022	Emily Bass	To End a Plague: America's Fight to Defeat AIDS in Africa	Shortlist	
2022	Rush Doshi	The Long Game: China's Grand Strategy to Displace American Order	Shortlist	
2022	Niall Ferguson	Doom: The Politics of Catastrophe	Shortlist	
2022	Jeffrey Veidlinger	In the Midst of Civilized Europe: The Pogroms of 1918–1921 and the Onset of the Holocaust	Shortlist	
2023	Susan L. Shirk	Overreach: How China Derailed Its Peaceful Rise	Winner	
2023	Chris Miller	Chip War: The Fight for the World’s Most Critical Technology	Shortlist	
2023	Steven Levitsky and Lucan Way	Revolution and Dictatorship: The Violent Origins of Durable Authoritarianism	Shortlist	
2023	J. Bradford DeLong	Slouching Towards Utopia: An Economic History of the Twentieth Century	Shortlist	
2023	Sergei Guriev and Daniel Treisman	Spin Dictators: The Changing Face of Tyranny in the 21st Century	Shortlist	
2024	Timothy Garton Ash	Homelands: A Personal History of Europe	Winner	
2024	Daron Acemoglu and Simon Johnson	Power and Progress: Our 1000-year Struggle Over Technology and Prosperity	Shortlist	
2024	Henry Farrell and Abraham Newman	Underground Empire: How America Weaponized the World Economy	Shortlist	
2024	Harold James	Seven Crashes: The Economic Crises that Shaped Globalization	Shortlist	
2024	Wendy H. Wong	We, The Data: Human Rights in the Digital Age	Shortlist	
2025	Sergey Radchenko	To Run the World: The Kremlin's Cold War Bid for Global Power	Winner	
2025	Mary Bridges	Dollars and Dominion: U.S. Bankers and the Making of a Superpower	Shortlist	
2025	Steve Coll	The Achilles Trap: Saddam Hussein, the C.I.A., and the Origins of America's Invasion of Iraq	Shortlist	
2025	Tim Cook	The Good Allies: How Canada and the United States Fought Together to Defeat Fascism during the Second World War	Shortlist	
2025	Benjamin Nathans	To the Success of Our Hopeless Cause: The Many Lives of the Soviet Dissident Movement	Shortlist	
