= Atrocities in the Congo Free State =

- Part of Colonization of the Congo Basin
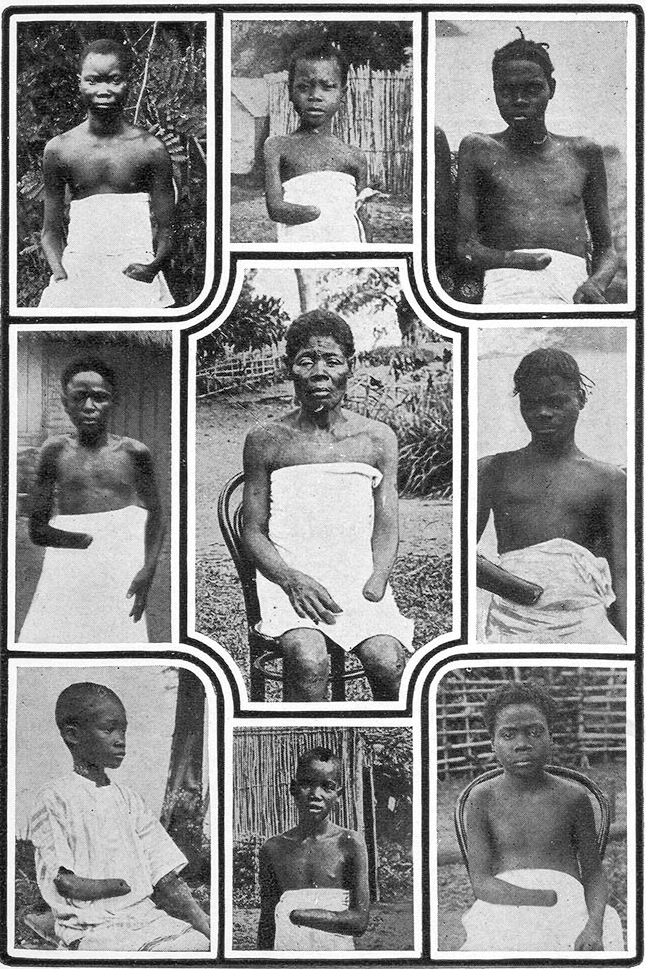
- Mutilated children in the Congo Free State
- Location: Congo Free State (present-day Democratic Republic of the Congo)
- Date: 1885–1908
- Attack type: Forced labour, mass killings, mutilations, village destruction, systematic rape
- Deaths: 1.2 million – 10 million population decline
- Injuries: Up to hundreds of thousands (including widespread hand amputations and whippings with the Chicotte)
- Perpetrators: Force Publique and concessionary companies under King Leopold II of Belgium
- Motive: Economic exploitation (rubber and ivory extraction)

From 1885 to 1908, many atrocities were committed in the Congo Free State (today the Democratic Republic of the Congo) under the absolute rule of King Leopold II of Belgium. These atrocities were particularly associated with the labour policies, enforced by colonial administrators, used to collect natural rubber for export. Combined with epidemic disease, famine, mass population displacement, and falling birth rates caused by these disruptions, the atrocities contributed to a sharp decline in the Congolese population. These atrocities have sometimes been described as a genocide, though this characterization is disputed. Modern estimates of the magnitude of the population decline ranges from 1.2 million to 10 million people.

At the Berlin Conference of 1884–1885, the European powers recognized the claims of a supposedly philanthropic organisation run by Leopold II, to most of the Congo Basin region. Leopold had long-held ambitions for colonial expansion. The territory under Leopold's control exceeded 2,600,000 km^{2} (1,000,000 mi^{2}), more than 85 times the territory of Belgium; amid financial problems, it was directed by a tiny cadre of administrators drawn from across Europe. Initially the quasi-colony proved unprofitable and insufficient, with the state always close to bankruptcy. The boom in demand for natural rubber, which was abundant in the territory, created a radical shift in the 1890s—to facilitate the extraction and export of rubber, all vacant land in the Congo was nationalised, with the majority distributed to private companies as concessions. Some was kept by the state. Between 1891 and 1906, the companies were allowed free rein to exploit the concessions, with the result being that forced labour and violent coercion were used to collect the rubber cheaply and maximise profit. The Free State's military force, the Force Publique, enforced the labour policies. Individual workers who refused to participate in rubber collection could be killed and entire villages razed.

The main direct cause of the population decline was disease, which was exacerbated by the social disruption caused by the atrocities of the Free State. A number of epidemics, notably African sleeping sickness, smallpox, swine influenza and amoebic dysentery, ravaged indigenous populations. In 1901 alone it was estimated that 500,000 Congolese had died from sleeping sickness. Disease, famine and violence combined to reduce the birth-rate while excess deaths rose.

The severing of workers' hands achieved particular international notoriety. These were sometimes cut off by Force Publique soldiers who were made to account for every shot they fired by bringing back the hands of their victims. These details were recorded by Christian missionaries working in the Congo and caused public outrage when they were made known in the United Kingdom, Belgium, the United States, and elsewhere. An international campaign against the Congo Free State began in 1890 and reached its apogee after 1900 under the leadership of the British activist E. D. Morel. On 15 November 1908, under international pressure, the Government of Belgium annexed the Congo Free State to form the Belgian Congo. It ended many of the systems responsible for the abuses. The size of the population decline during the period is the subject of extensive historiographical debate; there is an open debate as to whether the atrocities constitute genocide.

== Background ==
=== Establishment by Leopold II ===
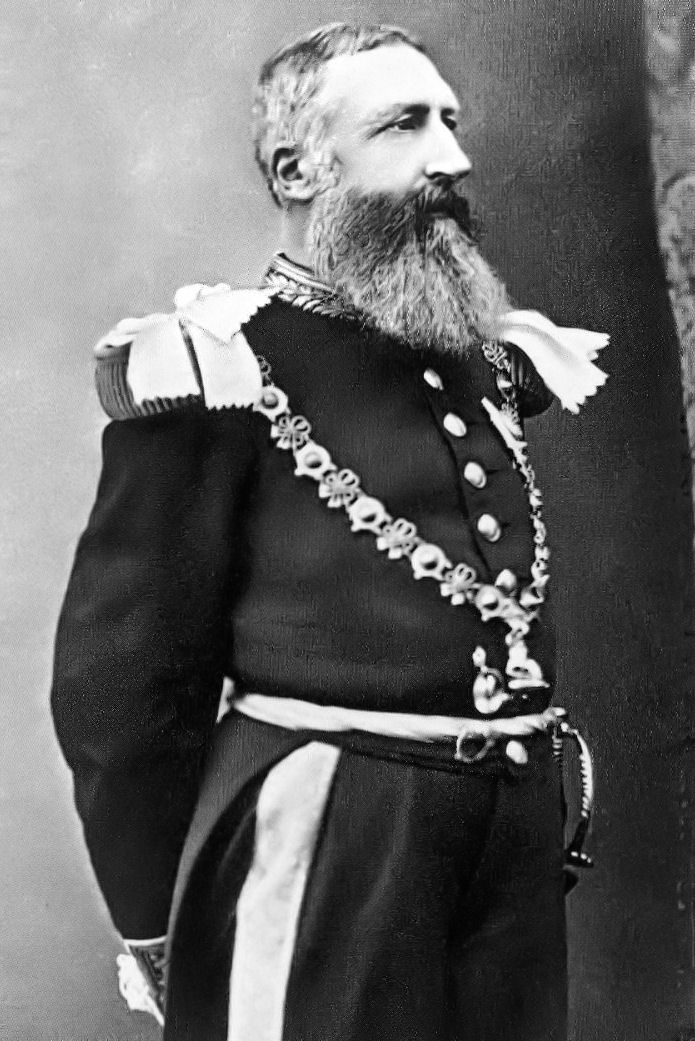
King Leopold II, whose rule of the Congo Free State was marked by severe atrocities, violence and major population decline.

Years before he became King of Belgium in 1865, Leopold II had pressed Belgian political leaders to support an overseas colony as a way to increase Belgium's standing among the world's great powers. In 1860, as Duke of Brabant, he presented the Belgian finance minister Walthère Frère-Orban, who was a vocal opponent of colonial projects, with a paperweight inscribed "Belgium needs a colony" (French: Il faut à la Belgique une colonie). In private remarks from this period, Leopold cited the Dutch East Indies as a model of colonial profitability and lamented that Belgium "doesn't exploit the world", adding that colonialism was "a taste we have got to make her learn".

Although Leopold expressed interest in acquiring lands in Abyssinia, Egypt, or Argentina, his proposals found little traction in Belgian politics, where colonial ventures were widely treated as costly, high-risk projects with unclear national benefit. Many Belgian politicians, such as Émile Vandervelde, campaigned against an overseas colony for economic and moral reasons. Leopold thus pursued the idea of a Congo colony largely as a personal enterprise rather than a state program.

According to historian Adam Hochschild, sub-Saharan Africa was "a logical place for an aspiring colonialist to look". Although the British and Boers controlled what is now South Africa, and Portugal and other powers claimed coastal pockets, about 80 percent of the entire land area of Africa was still under indigenous rulers. Crucially, for Leopold, the "equatorial heart of the continent" was the "biggest blank space on the map".

After turning his attention to Central Africa, he convened the Brussels Geographic Conference of 1876 and created the International African Association (AIA), publicly framed as a scientific and humanitarian body dedicated to exploration, anti-slavery, and "civilizing" work in the Congo Basin. However, the association actually functioned as an instrument for Leopold's territorial ambitions. In 1878, he hired Henry Morton Stanley to explore the Congo River system, establish stations, and secure treaties with local rulers on Leopold's behalf.

I do not want to risk losing a fine chance to secure for ourselves a slice of this magnificent African cake.

— Leopold, in a private letter to his envoy (1877).

Between 1879 and 1882, Leopold reorganized his Congo operations under the International Association of the Congo, seeking formal international recognition for a single independent entity in the basin. During the Berlin Conference of 1884–1885, European leaders officially recognised Leopold's control of the notionally-independent Congo Free State on the grounds that it would be a free trade area and buffer state between British and French spheres of influence. European powers subsequently acknowledged Leopold as sovereign of the 2.35 million square kilometer colony, held by him in personal union with Belgium rather than as a Belgian colony.

=== Economic and administrative situation ===
Ultimately the state's policy towards its African subjects became dominated by the demands which were made—both by the state itself and by the concessionary companies—for labour for the collection of wild produce of the territory. The system itself engendered abuses ...

— Ruth Slade (1962)

The Free State was intended, above all, to be profitable for its investors and Leopold in particular. Although its sponsors expected the venture to net "quick and easy" profits, initial ivory exports failed to return as much money as investors had hoped and the colonial administration was frequently in debt. Historian Jean Stengers described the state before 1890 as a financially "frail creature that needed aid", running its course in "relative calm" with minimal governance.

However, the invention of the inflatable rubber tyre around 1890 spurred a boom in worldwide demand for natural rubber. Stengers contends that the popularity of rubber provided Leopold with "miraculous deliverance" from near-bankruptcy, and transformed the state into a highly profitable enterprise. This shift was formalized by a series of controversial and "unscrupulous" decrees between 1891 and 1892, through which the King nationalized approximately 99 percent of the country and its wild resources, effectively killing free trade and instituting a state-enforced monopoly.

As the Free State forcibly compelled Congolese males to harvest wild rubber, which could then be exported to Europe and North America, exports skyrocketed over 500%, recasting what had been an unexceptional colonial system into a lucrative cash cow for Leopold. The state's domain revenue increased from roughly 150,000 francs in 1890 to more than 18 million francs by 1901. According to Belgian Historian David Van Reybrouck, this transformation marked the beginning of a universal reign of terror that resulted in violence, horror, and death on an "exponentially greater scale" than previously seen.

Leopold exercised total personal control over the state's administration without much delegation to subordinates. African chiefs played an important role by implementing government orders within their communities. Throughout much of its existence, however, Free State presence in the territory that it claimed was inconsistent, with its few officials concentrated in a number of small and widely dispersed "stations" which controlled only small amounts of hinterland. In 1900, there were just 3,000 white people in the Congo, of whom only half were Belgian. The Free State was perpetually short of administrative staff and officials, who numbered between 700 and 1,500 during the period.

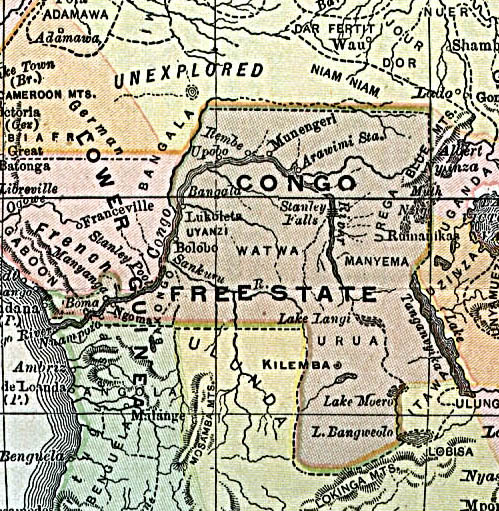
Map of the Congo Free State in 1892

To facilitate economic extraction from the Free State, land was divided up under the so-called "domain system" (régime domanial) in 1891. All vacant land, including forests and areas not under cultivation, was decreed to be "uninhabited" and thus in the possession of the state, leaving many of the Congo's resources (especially rubber and ivory) under direct colonial ownership. Concessions were allocated to private companies. In the north, the Société Anversoise was given 160,000 km^{2} (62,000 sq mi), while the Anglo-Belgian India Rubber Company (ABIR) was given a comparable territory in the south. The Compagnie du Katanga and Compagnie des Grands Lacs were given smaller concessions in the south and east respectively. Leopold kept 250,000 km^{2} (97,000 sq mi) of territory known as the "Crown Domain" (Domaine de la Couronne) under personal rule, which was added to the territory he already controlled under the Private Domain (Domaine privé).

Thus most economic exploitation of the Congolese interior was undertaken by Leopold and the major concessionaires. The system was extremely profitable and ABIR made a turnover of over 100 per cent on its initial stake in a single year. The King made 70 million Belgian francs' profit from the system between 1896 and 1905. The Free State's concession system was soon copied by other colonial regimes, notably those in the neighbouring French Congo.

In the early years of the Free State, much of the administration's attention was focused on consolidating its control by fighting the African peoples on the Free State's periphery who resisted the Free State's rule. These included the tribes around the Kwango, in the south-west, and the Uele in the north-east. Some of the violence of the period can be attributed to African groups using colonial support to settle scores or white administrators acting without state approval.

=== Red rubber system and the Force Publique ===
Leopold had used African mercenaries since at least 1879, but in 1888, he formally organized them into the Force Publique, a colonial army for his new state. By the late 1890s, it had grown to more than 19,000 soldiers and consumed more than 50% of the state's budget; it was the most powerful army in Central Africa. The force was at once counter-guerrilla, an army of occupation, and a corporate labour police force, divided mainly into small garrisons alongside riverbanks. Several dozen black soldiers, recruited from as far afield as Zanzibar, Nigeria, and Liberia typically served under one or two white officers. The initial handful of military posts quickly grew to 183 by 1900, and to 313 by 1908.

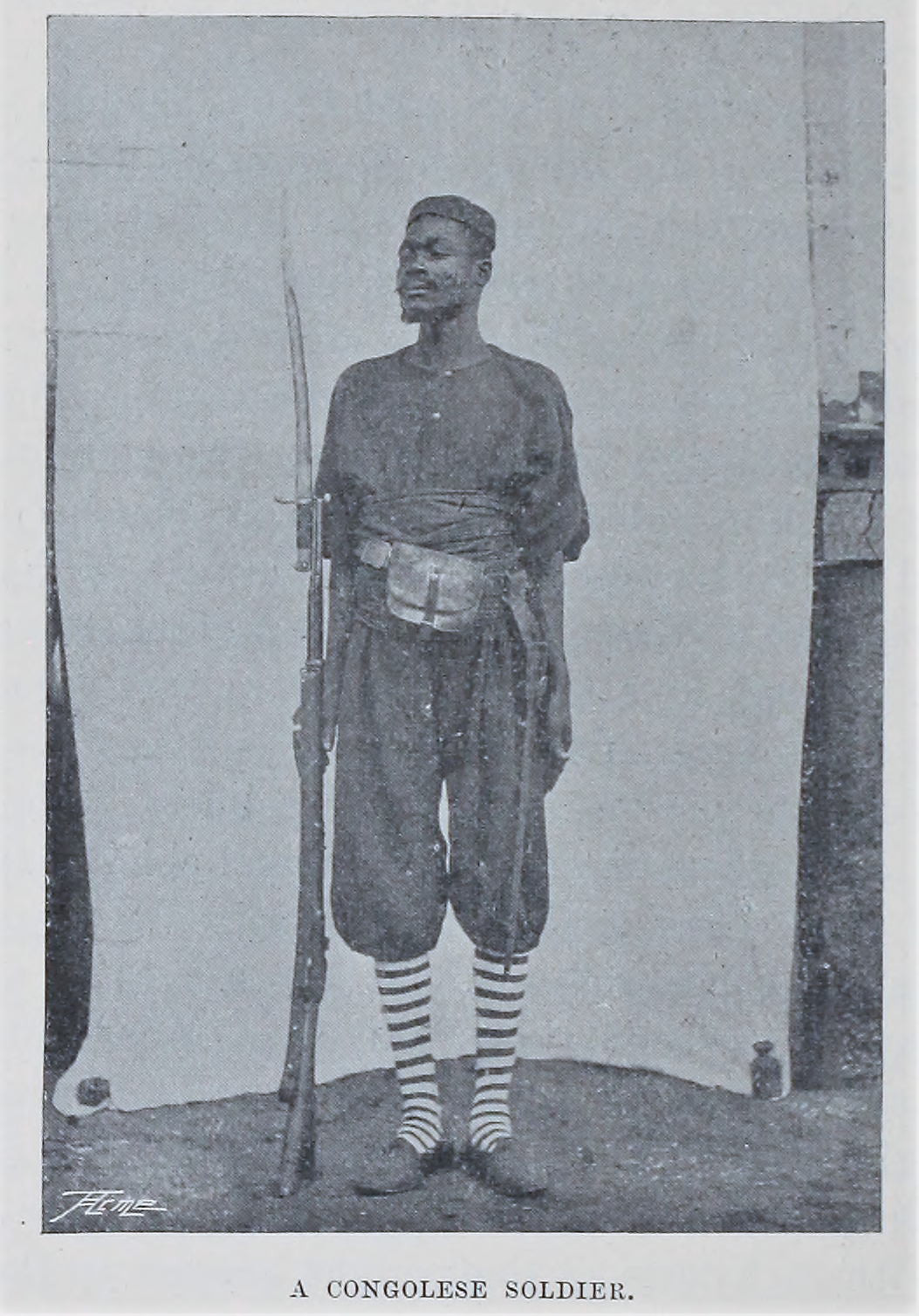
A Force Publique soldier in 1898

Because most of the Free State's revenue came from rubber exports, the administration developed a labour regime, criticized at the time as the "red rubber system", to maximize rubber extraction. Forced labour was imposed as a form of taxation, (Note: Demanding taxation in the form of forced labour was common across colonial Africa at the time.) engendering what some modern historians have described as a "slave society", since companies relied increasingly on the forcible mobilization of Congolese workers to meet rubber quotas. The state appointed African intermediaries, known as capitas, to organize and supervise labourers. Pressure to raise output and profits led officials to set quotas centrally and often arbitrarily, with little regard for available labour or workers' welfare.

In concessionary territories, private companies that had purchased extraction rights from the state could employ almost any methods they chose to increase production and profit, with minimal state oversight. Furthermore, according to historian David Gibbs, the lack of a developed bureaucracy produced an atmosphere of "informality" throughout the state in regard to the operation of enterprises, which facilitated further abuses. Treatment of labourers (especially the duration of service) was not regulated by law and instead was left to the discretion of officials on the ground. The Anglo-Belgian India Rubber Company (ABIR) and the Société Anversoise du Commerce au Congo were particularly noted for the harshness with which their officials treated Congolese workers.

Rubber extraction relied on compulsory quotas enforced by both colonial armies and company militias. The Force Publique acted as a corporate labour police force and its soldiers saw to the collection of the rubber tax in areas controlled directly by the Free State (such as in the Crown Domain). In the territories allotted to concessionaires, collection was managed by armed guards known as "sentries", which were essentially the company's militia force. The red rubber system emerged with the creation of the concession regime in 1891 and lasted until 1906 when the concession system was restricted. At its height, it was heavily localised in the Équateur, Bandundu, and Kasai regions.

== Atrocities ==
=== Forced labour ===
The historian Jean Stengers described regions controlled by concession companies as "veritable hells-on-earth". In ABIR territory, a normal quota was three to four kilos of dried rubber per adult male per fortnight. Because the rubber vines near most villages were rapidly exhausted, gatherers were forced to travel farther into the jungle to get enough rubber; an official in the Mongala basin estimated gatherers needed to spend about twenty four days of all-day labour per month in the forest to meet quotas.

In the Congo, raw rubber comes in the form of coagulated sap, which is the solid material derived from the syrup-like latex of the long spongy vine of the Landolphia genus. The process of collecting this product was intensely physically painful because, to make the liquid latex dry and coagulate, gatherers had to spread the substance on their arms, thighs, and chest, and the ensuing act of pulling or tearing off the dried rubber from the hairy parts of the body was excruciating. Force Publique officer Louis Chaltin wrote that Africans disliked making rubber and "must be compelled" to do it.

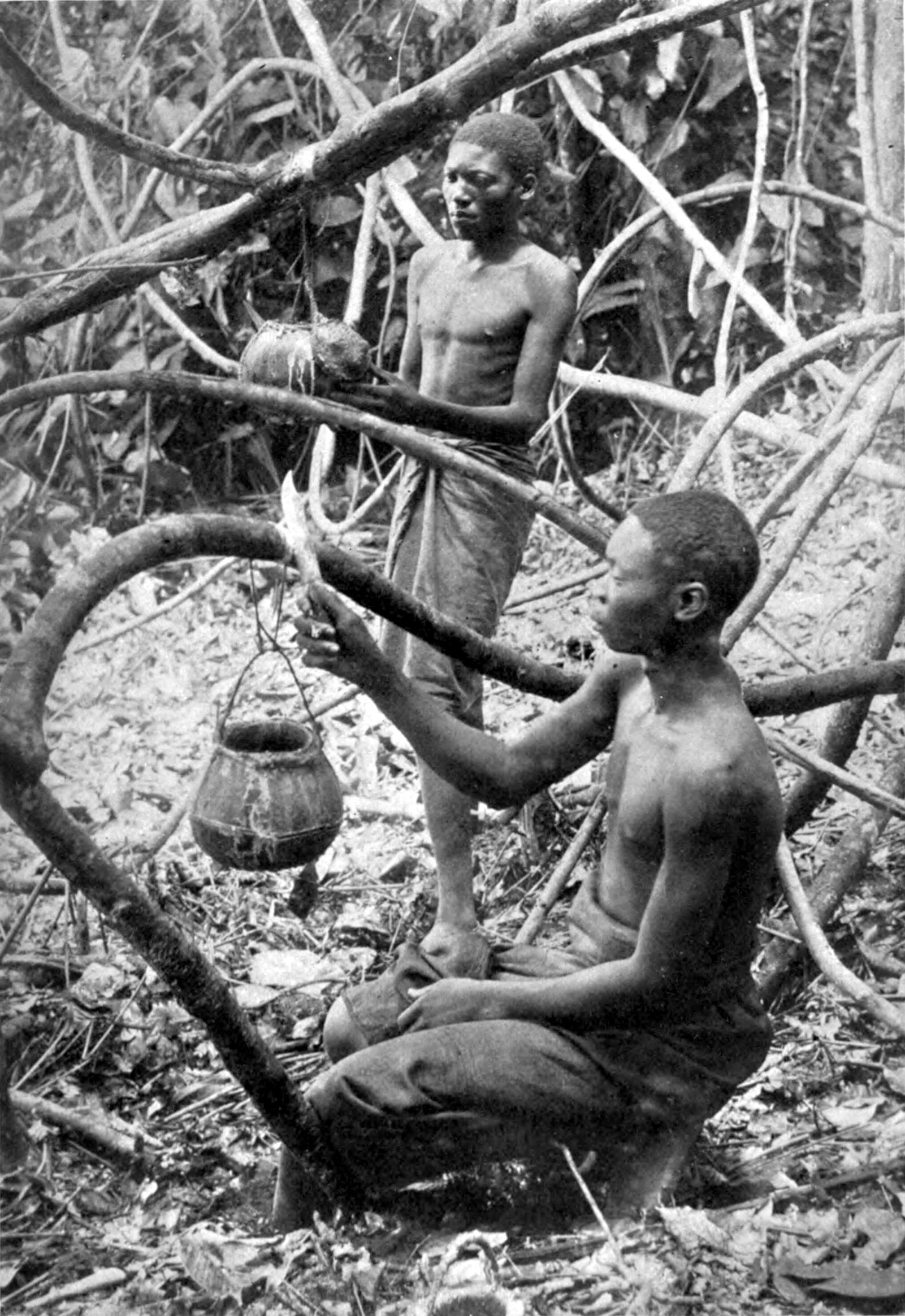
Congolese labourers tapping rubber near Lusambo in Kasai

Workers who refused to supply their labour were coerced with "constraint and repression". Dissenters were beaten or whipped, hostages were taken to ensure prompt collection, and punitive expeditions were sent to destroy villages which refused. Much of the enforcement of rubber production was the responsibility of the Force Publique, the colonial military. Rubber harvesters were usually compensated for their labour with cheap items, such as a cloth, beads, a portion of salt, or a knife. On one occasion, a customary chief who ordered his subjects to gather rubber was rewarded with slaves.

The policy led to a collapse of Congolese economic and cultural life, as well as farming in some areas. According to Van Reybrouck, gathering rubber required full-time labour, leaving "no time" for other work while the compulsion to remain in the forest meant that "fields lay fallow" and agriculture dwindled to basic staples, producing famine and leaving communities "listless, enfeebled, and malnourished". Commerce likewise "came to a standstill", and specialized crafts including iron smithing and woodcarving were lost as subsistence and artisanal production were displaced by forced extraction.

The so-called Zappo Zaps (from the Songye ethnic group) were the most feared. Reportedly cannibals, the Zappo Zaps frequently abused their official positions to raid the countryside for slaves. By 1900, the Force Publique numbered 19,000 men. In addition to the army, rubber companies employed their own militias, which often worked in tandem with the Force Publique to enforce their rule.

=== Mutilation and brutality ===
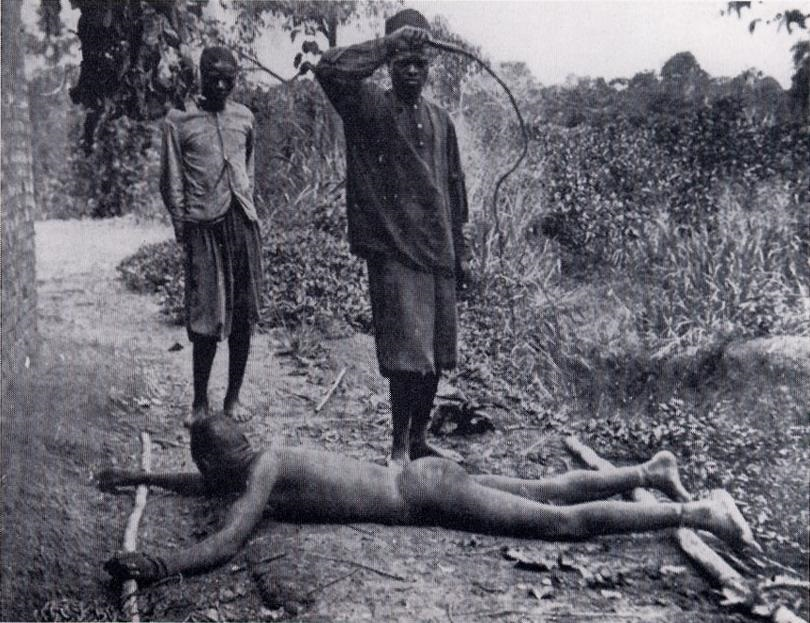
Posed photo of a man being flogged with a sjambok (chicotte) by a Congo State soldier ca.1905

The Congo Free State's military apparatus (including Belgian officers and company troops) systematically used mutilative force to intimidate, punish, and control the local population. Drawing on missionary reports and colonial memoirs, historian Adam Hochschild described hand-severing and hostage-taking as deliberate state policy: when a village "refused to submit to the rubber regime" state or company troops sometimes "shot everyone in sight" so that neighbouring communities would "get the message".

A central instrument of terror was the chicotte, a whip made of raw, sun dried hippopotamus hide, typically applied to the victim's bare buttocks. According to Hochschild, the use of the whip was so ubiquitous that "in the minds of the territory's people, it soon became as closely identified with white rule as the steamboat or the rifle." Blows left permanent scars, more than twenty five strokes could cause unconsciousness, and punishments of a hundred strokes or more were often fatal.

One Belgian magistrate, Stanislas Lefranc, reported the chicotte being used on children in Leopoldville, and later described routine public beatings in which victims were held down, stripped, whipped, and then forced to salute afterward. Lefranc's protests of the practice were mocked and ignored by his superiors; he also published descriptions of the beatings in pamphlets and newspaper articles in Belgium, which provoked little reaction.

"Some thirty urchins, of whom several were seven or eight years old, lined up and waiting their turn, watching, terrified, at their companions being flogged. Most of the urchins, in a paroxysm of grief...kicked so frightfully that the soldiers ordered to hold them by the hands and feet had to lift them off the ground...twenty-five times the whip slashed down on each of the children."

— Stanislas Lefranc's 1890s account of public whippings in Leopoldville of children accused of laughing in the presence of a white man.

Contemporaneously, reform campaigners (including Arthur Conan Doyle, Roger Casement, and E. D. Morel) publicized testimony from European officers about punitive raids in the colony. In one account later quoted in a British newspaper history of the Congo reform movement, a Force Publique subaltern described a raid to punish a recalcitrant village. The officer in command "ordered us to cut off the heads of the men and hang them on the village palisades ... and to hang the women and the children on the palisade in the form of a cross".

In the 1950s, Belgian missionaries interviewed survivors of the "rubber terror", (Note: Hochschild clarifies: "The quotation on page 166 comes from an article based on interviews, in the 1950s, with dozens of Africans who survived the rubber terror of half a century earlier. A Belgian missionary, Edmond Boelaert, conducted these conversations and then translated them along with another missionary, Gustaaf Hulstaert, and a Congolese colleague, Charles Lonkama. The priests were anticolonialists of a sort, frequently in trouble with Catholic authorities. The Centre Aequatoria, at a mission station near Mbandaka, Congo, and its Belgian supporters have now placed on the Internet the full French text of these interviews, which run to some two hundred pages. All are, unfortunately, far too short to give us a full picture of someone's life, but they still offer rare firsthand African testimony.") transcribing and translating oral histories containing firsthand African accounts of the regime's brutality. In one of these interviews, a man named Tswambe describes the state official Léon Fiévez, who, in Hochschild's words, "terrorized" a district along the river about 500 kilometers north of Stanley Pool.

Tswambe recalled that "all the blacks saw this man as the Devil of the Equator", that soldiers under Fiévez's authority cut off the hands from "all the bodies killed in the field", brought them "in baskets" so Fiévez could count them. "Rubber caused these torments", Tswambe recounted, describing how he watched a soldier named "Molili" place ten arrested villagers in a large net weighted with stones before drowning them in the river; several survivors later said that they had lived through a massacre by acting dead, not moving even when their hands were severed, and waiting till the soldiers left before seeking help. Some officers and soldiers forced young men to kill or rape their own mothers and sisters.

==== Severed hands as proof and currency ====
Missionary and colonial testimonies describe severed hands as a central feature of the coercive system. African-American Presbyterian missionary, William Sheppard, reported in 1899 that an allied chief near the Kasai River showed him 81 right hands being smoked over a fire, explaining that he "always [had] to cut off the right hands of those we kill in order to show the State how many we have killed". Hochschild documents that some European officers were concerned about cartridges issued to Force Publique soldiers being "wasted" on hunting or kept for possible mutiny, so they demanded proof that each bullet had been used to kill someone. According to one officer quoted in a missionary account, soldiers sometimes fired at an animal and then cut a hand from a living person to make up the required tally, and in some units a designated "keeper of the hands" smoked the severed hands so they could be presented to officials later.

Throughout the early twentieth century, reform advocates used missionary testimony to highlight the role of severed hands in this system. E. V. Sjöblom, a Swedish Baptist missionary, reported at a public meeting in London 1897 that African soldiers told him they were rewarded according to the number of hands they brought in, and that a state officer paid them in brass rods for baskets of hands. One soldier told Sjöblom that "the Commissioner has promised us if we have plenty of hands he will shorten our service", which Sjöblom presented as evidence that hands functioned as a kind of bounty for killings under the "rubber terror".

Drawing on such testimony, novelist Peter Forbath has argued that severed hands were a defining symbol of the Congo Free State and "became a sort of currency". He contended that, in practice, Force Publique soldiers and allied auxiliaries sometimes presented hands instead of rubber when they could not meet a quota, used hands to make up for missing conscripts for labour gangs, and, in some cases, received bonuses according to how many hands they collected. According to Renton, Seddon, and Zeilig, severed hands were "the most potent symbol of colonial brutality" in the Congo.

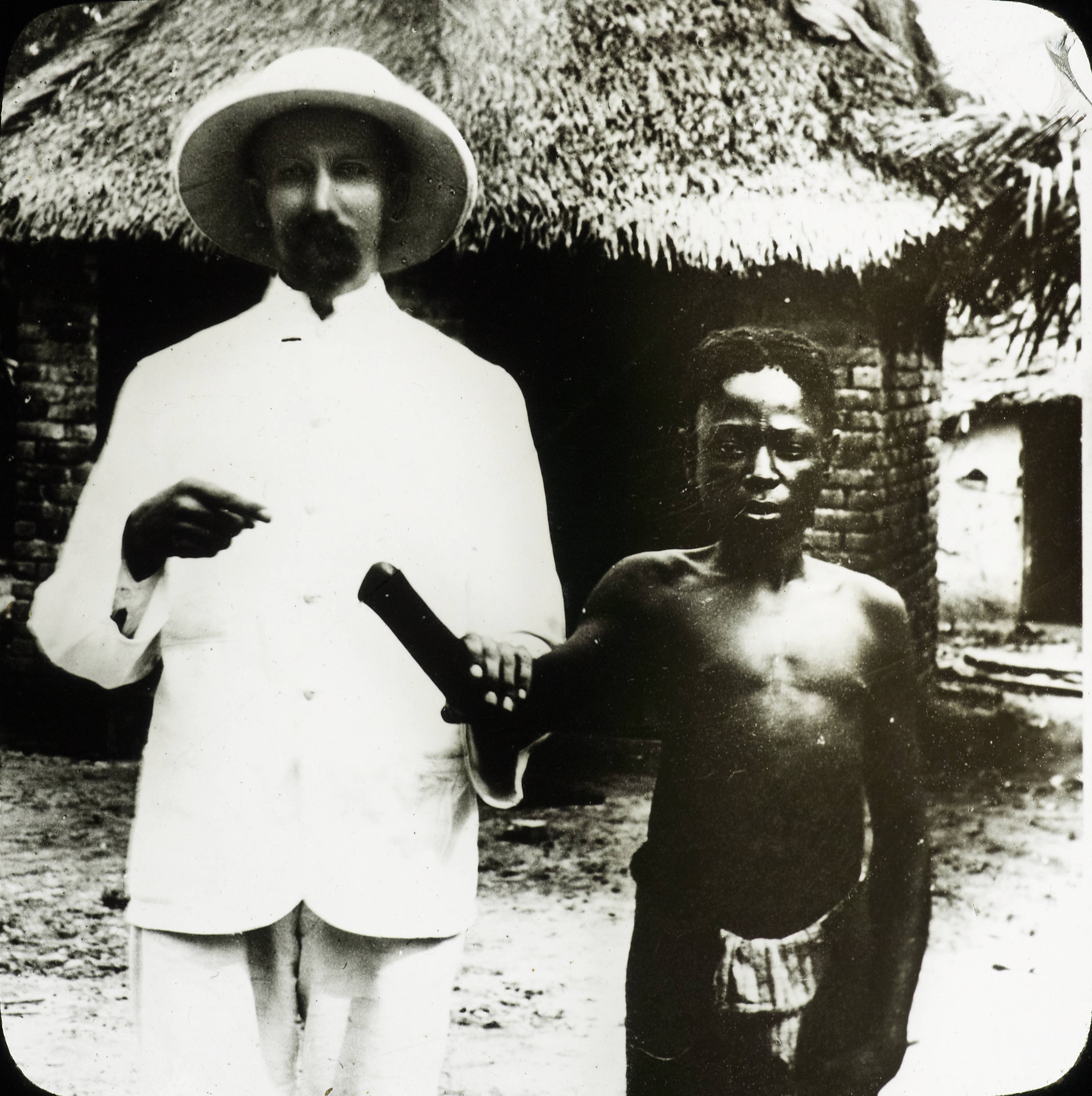
A missionary holds up a Congolese man's arm at the elbow, and points to his missing hand

Modern historians have debated how far dismemberment of living people formed a systematic policy. In 2014, David Van Reybrouck stated that the photographs of mutilated people have created a misconception that dismemberment of the living was a widespread practice. Instead, he posits that the "hand system" was primarily tied to the control of ammunition and to lethal violence, rather than to a formal policy of amputating living people as a routine punishment for failing to collect rubber. He wrote that while dismemberment of the living did occasionally happen, the practice was not as systemic as often presented.

Jean Stengers and Daniël Vangroenweghe have also stated there was no systemic practice of dismembering living people as a punishment for not producing enough rubber. Most cases of dismemberment of the living were caused by soldiers who had shot people and had cut off their hands thinking they were dead while they were in fact still alive.

Leopold II reportedly disapproved of dismemberment because it harmed his economic interests. He was quoted as saying: "Cut off hands—that's idiotic. I'd cut off all the rest of them, but not hands. That's the one thing I need in the Congo."

=== Prisons and hostage taking ===
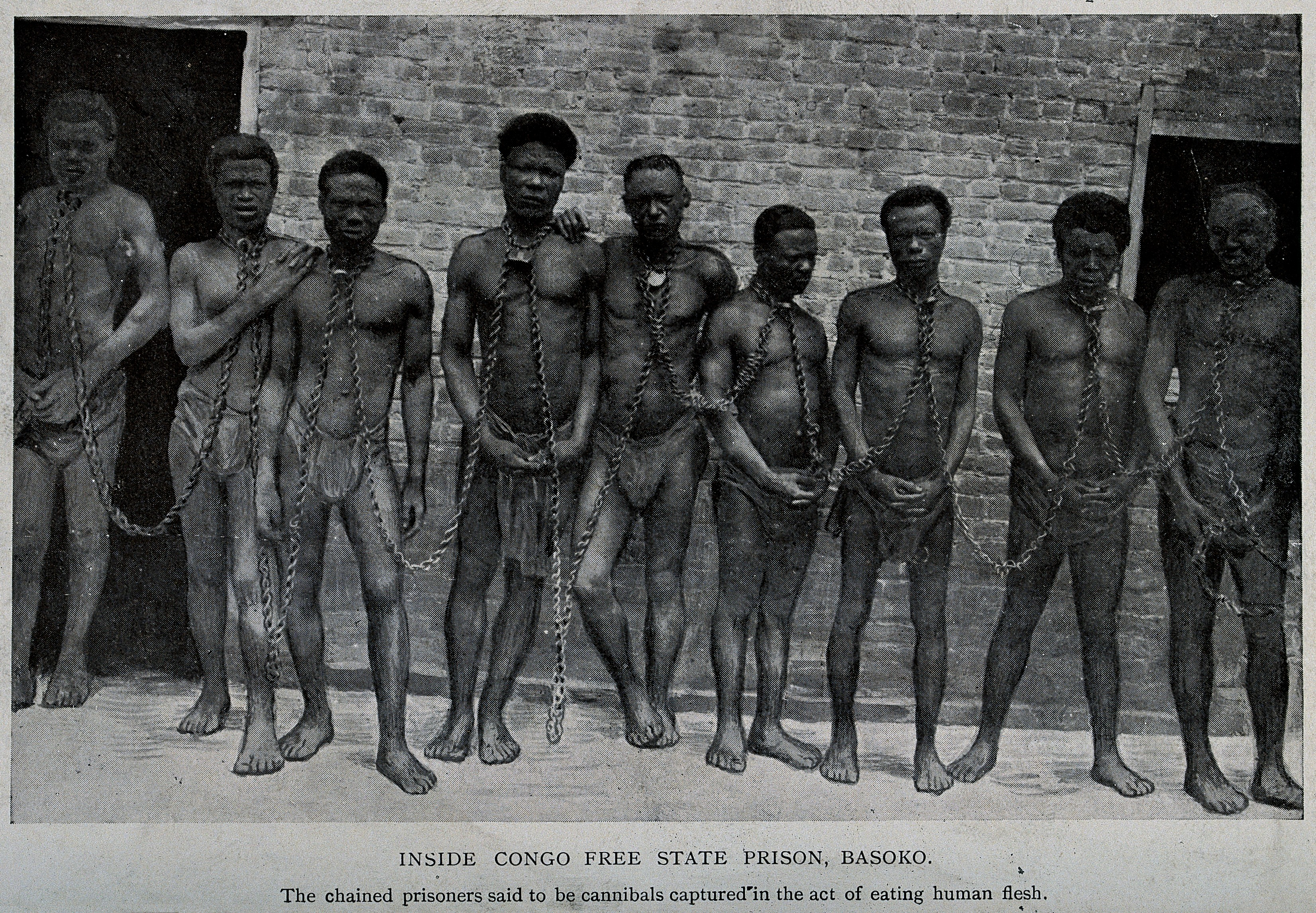
A line of Congolese prisoners in Basoko joined by large neck chains

One practice used to force workers to collect rubber included taking wives and family members hostage. Leopold never proclaimed it an official policy, and Free State authorities in Brussels emphatically denied that it was employed. Nevertheless, the administration supplied a manual to each station in the Congo which included a guide on how to take hostages to coerce local chiefs. The hostages could be men, women, children, elders, or even the chiefs themselves. Every state or company station maintained a stockade for imprisoning hostages. ABIR agents would imprison the chief of any village which fell behind its quota; in July 1902 one post recorded that it held 44 chiefs in prison. These prisons were in poor condition and the posts at Bongandanga and Mompono each recorded death rates of three to ten prisoners per day in 1899. Persons with records of resisting ABIR were deported to forced labour camps. There were at least three such camps: one at Lireko, one on the Upper Maringa River and one on the Upper Lopori River.

=== Wars and rebellions ===
Aside from rubber collection, violence in the Free State chiefly occurred in connection with wars and rebellions. Native states, notably Msiri's Yeke Kingdom, the Zande Federation, and Swahili-speaking territory in the eastern Congo under slave trader Tippu Tip, refused to recognise colonial authority and were defeated by the Force Publique with great brutality, during the Congo–Arab War. In 1895, a military mutiny broke out among the Batetela in Kasai, leading to a four-year insurgency. The conflict was particularly brutal and caused a great number of casualties.

=== Famine ===
The presence of rubber companies such as ABIR exacerbated the effect of natural disasters such as famine and disease. ABIR's tax collection system forced men out from the villages to collect rubber which meant that there was no labour available to clear new fields for planting. This in turn meant that the women had to continue to plant worn-out fields resulting in lower yields, a problem aggravated by company sentries stealing crops and farm animals. The post at Bonginda experienced a famine in 1899 and in 1900 missionaries recorded a "terrible famine" across ABIR's concession.

=== Child colonies ===
Leopold sanctioned the creation of "child colonies", in which orphaned Congolese would be kidnapped and sent to schools operated by Catholic missionaries where they would learn to work or be soldiers. These were the only schools funded by the state. More than 50% of the children sent to the schools died of disease, and thousands more died in the forced marches into the colonies. In one such march, 108 boys were sent over to a mission school and only 62 survived, eight of whom died a week later.

=== Labour of non-Congolese ===
Indigenous Congolese were not the only ones put to work by the free state. Five hundred forty Chinese labourers were imported to work on railways in the Congo; however, 300 of them would die or leave their posts. Caribbean peoples and people from other African countries were also imported to work on the railway in which 3,600 would die in the first two years of construction from railroad accidents, lack of shelter, flogging, hunger, and disease.

=== Cannibalism ===
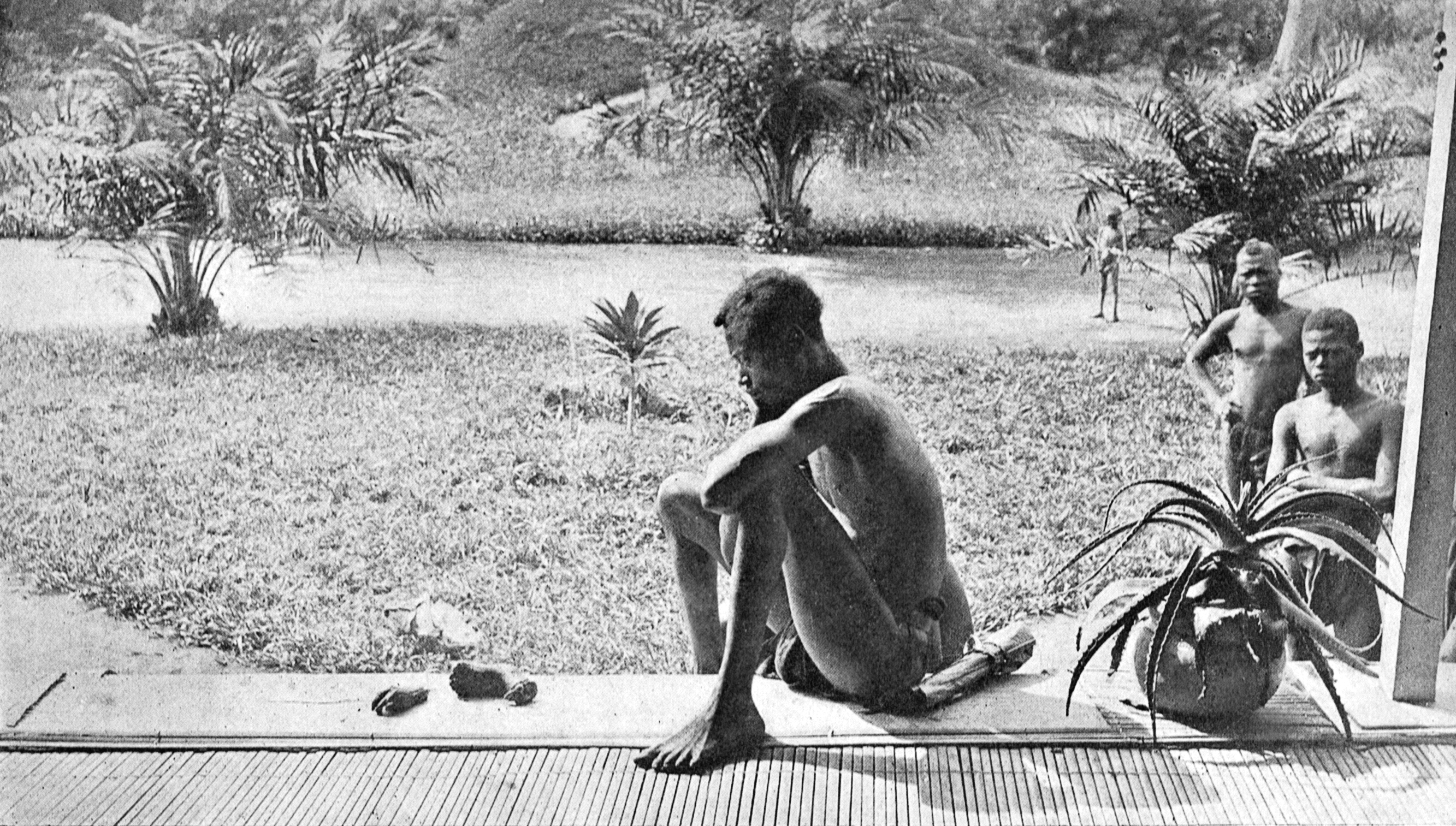
A Congolese man, Nsala, looking at the severed hand and foot of his five-year-old daughter who in 1904 was killed, cooked, and cannibalised by armed guards of a company holding a concession for rubber collection. The photo was taken by Alice Seely Harris.

Cannibalism was well-established in parts of the Free State area when the State was founded. In the Force Publique, cannibalism was strictly forbidden and could be punished by death, but it nevertheless happened. The colonial administration seems to have done little to suppress this custom, sometimes rather tolerating it among its own auxiliary troops and allies. When sending out "punitive expeditions" against villages unwilling or unable to fulfil the government's exorbitant rubber quota, Free State officials repeatedly turned a blind eye both to arbitrary killings by Force Publique members and to the "cannibal feast[s]" among native soldiers that sometimes followed.

During the Congo Arab war in 1892–1894, there were reports of widespread cannibalisation of the bodies of defeated combatants by the Batetela allies of the Belgian commander Francis Dhanis. Though officials at that time expressed the hope that it would be possible to suppress such acts once the war was over, this did not fully happen. In 1898, Dhanis reported in a letter that some of his soldiers had recently killed, roasted, and completely eaten a group of six people.

== Population decline ==
=== Causes ===
I suggest that it is impossible to separate deaths caused by massacre and starvation from those due to the pandemic of sleeping sickness (trypanosomiasis) which decimated central Africa at the time.

— Neal Ascherson (1999)

Historians generally agree that a dramatic reduction in the overall size of the Congolese population occurred during the two decades of Free State rule in the Congo. It is argued that the reduction in the Congo was atypical and can be attributed to the direct and indirect effects of colonial rule, including disease and falling birthrate.

The historian Adam Hochschild argued that the dramatic fall in the Free State population was the result of a combination of "murder", "starvation, exhaustion and exposure", "disease" and "a plummeting birth rate". Sleeping sickness was also a major cause of fatality at the time. Opponents of Leopold's rule stated, however, that the administration itself was to be considered responsible for the spreading of the epidemic. Violence and murder were likely not the primary causes of deaths, though detailed statistics are unavailable due to a lack of records. In a local study of the Kuba and Kete peoples, the historian Jan Vansina estimated that violence accounted for the deaths of less than five per cent of the population.

The sentries introduced gross and wholesale immorality, broke up family life, and spread disease throughout the land. Formerly native conditions put restrictions on the spread of disease and localized it to small areas, but the black Congo soldiers, moving hither and thither to districts far from their wives and homes, took the women they wanted and ignored native institutions, rights, and customs.

— Raphael Lemkin

Diseases imported by Arab traders, European colonists and African porters ravaged the Congolese population and "greatly exceeded" the numbers killed by violence. Smallpox, sleeping sickness, amoebic dysentery, venereal diseases (especially syphilis and gonorrhea), and swine influenza were particularly severe. Lawyer Raphael Lemkin attributed the quick spread of disease in Congo to the indigenous soldiers employed by the state, who moved across the country and had sex with women in many different places, thus spreading localised outbreaks across a larger area. Sleeping sickness, in particular, was "epidemic in large areas" of the Congo and had a high mortality rate. In 1901 alone, it is estimated that as many as 500,000 Congolese died from sleeping sickness.

Vansina estimated that five per cent of the Congolese population perished from swine influenza. In areas in which dysentery became endemic, between 30 and 60 per cent of the population could die. Vansina also pointed to the effects of malnutrition and food shortages in reducing immunity to the new diseases. The disruption of African rural populations may have helped to spread diseases further. Nevertheless, historian Roger Anstey wrote that "a strong strand of local, oral tradition holds the rubber policy to have been a greater cause of death and depopulation than either the scourge of sleeping sickness or the periodic ravages of smallpox."

It is also widely believed that birth rates fell during the period too, meaning that the growth rate of the population fell relative to the natural death rate. Vansina, however, notes that precolonial societies had high birth and death rates, leading to a great deal of natural population fluctuation over time. Among the Kuba, the period 1880 to 1900 was actually one of population expansion.

=== Estimates ===
A reduction of the population of the Congo is noted by several researchers who have compared the country at the beginning of Leopold's control with the beginning of Belgian state rule in 1908, but estimates of the death toll vary considerably, mainly due to the absence of reliable demographic sources about the region, as well as the sometimes unsubstantiated numbers mentioned by contemporaries in the late nineteenth and early twentieth century. Estimates of some contemporary observers suggest that the population decreased by half during this period. According to Edmund D. Morel, the Congo Free State counted "20 million souls". Ascherson cites an estimate by Roger Casement of a population fall of three million, although he notes that it is "almost certainly an underestimate". Peter Forbath gave a figure of at least five million deaths; John Gunther similarly estimates that Leopold's regime caused five to eight million deaths. Lemkin posited that 75% of the population was killed.

Since no census records the population of the region at the inception of the Congo Free State (the first was taken in 1924), the precise population change in the period is not known. Despite this, Forbath more recently claimed the loss was at least five million. Demographer Jean-Paul Sanderson estimates the population in 1885 at around 10–15 million people. In 2020, based on demographically modelling three scenarios of population decline, he concluded that to be demographically possible, the decline should be in the range of one to five million. The scenario giving the lower limit was the most demographically reasonable, whereas the one giving the upper limit was very extreme, but still within the possible.

Other investigators put the number of deaths significantly higher. In his 1998 book King Leopold's Ghost, Adam Hochschild used an approximate number of 10 million. Hochschild cites several recent independent lines of investigation, by anthropologist Jan Vansina and others, that examine local sources (police records, religious records, oral traditions, genealogies, personal diaries), which generally agree with the assessment of the 1919 Belgian government commission: roughly half the population perished during the Free State period, based on numbers from the rubber provinces. Since the first official census by the Belgian authorities in 1924 put the population at about 10 million, these various approaches suggest a rough estimate of a population decline by 10 million. Jan Vansina returned to the issue of quantifying the total population decline, and discarded his earlier claim of 50 per cent; he concluded that the Kuba population (one of the many Congolese populations) was rising during the first two decades of Leopold II's rule, and declined by 25 per cent from 1900 to 1919, mainly due to sickness and that numbers from the rubber provinces could not be readily extrapolated to the entire Congo area.

Others argued a decrease of 20 per cent over the first forty years of colonial rule (up to the census of 1924). Historian Isidore Ndaywel è Nziem estimates a population decline of between 5 and 10 million. Louis and Stengers state that population figures at the start of Leopold's control are only "wild guesses", while calling E. D. Morel's attempt and others at coming to a figure for population losses "but figments of the imagination". Generally, works based on the highest numbers have often been discredited as "wild" and "unsubstantiated", whereas authors who point out the lack of reliable demographic data are questioned by others, calling them "minimalists", "agnosticists" and "revisionists" who allegedly "seek to downplay or minimize the atrocities".

== Investigation and international awareness ==
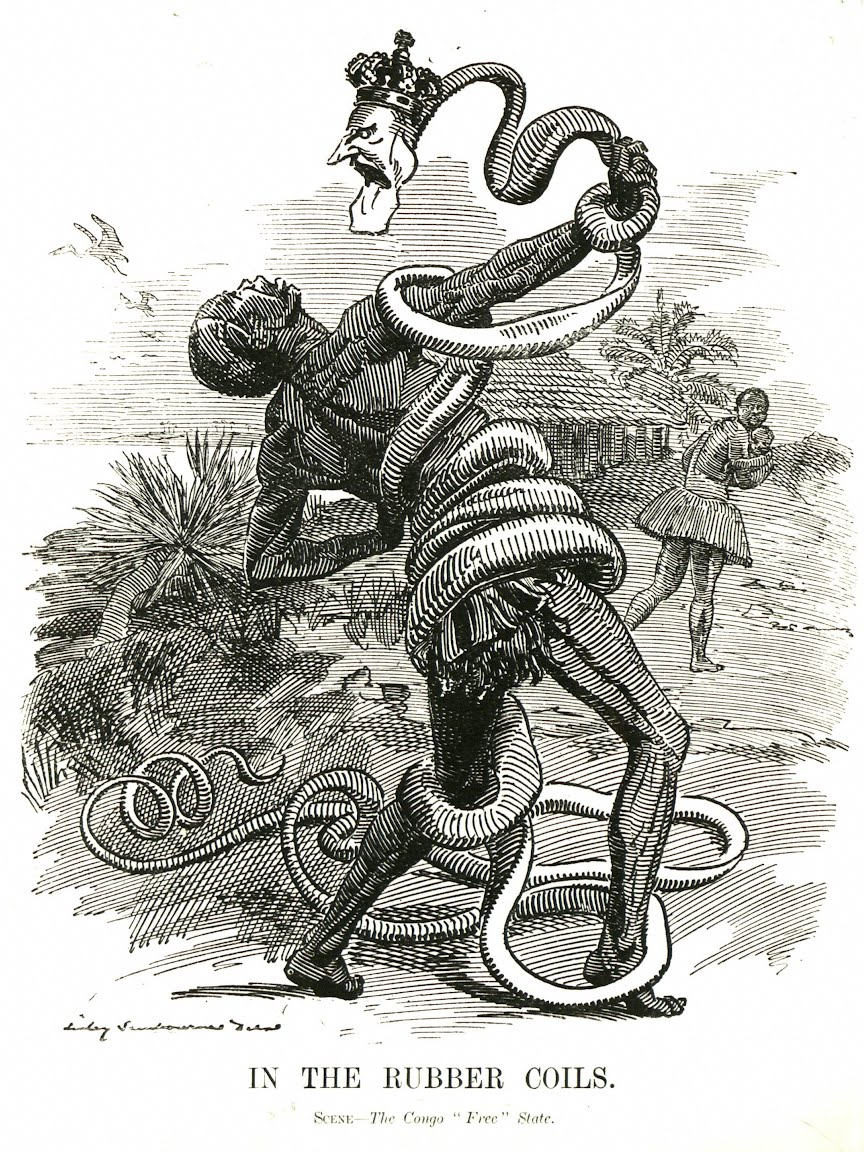
1906 cartoon by Edward Linley Sambourne published in the British satirical magazine Punch showing a Congolese worker, entangled by a rubber snake with the head of Leopold II.

Eventually, growing scrutiny of Leopold's regime led to a popular campaign movement, centred in the United Kingdom and the United States, to force Leopold to renounce his ownership of the Congo. In many cases, the campaigns based their information on reports from British and Swedish missionaries working in the Congo.

The first international protest occurred in 1890 when George Washington Williams, an American, published an open letter to Leopold about abuses he had witnessed. In a letter to the United States Secretary of State, he described conditions in the Congo as "crimes against humanity", thus coining the phrase, which would later become key language in international law. Public interest in the abuses in the Congo Free State grew sharply from 1895, when the Stokes Affair and reports of mutilations reached the European and American public which began to discuss the "Congo Question". To appease public opinion, Leopold instigated a Commission for the Protection of Natives (Commission pour la Protection des Indigènes), composed of foreign missionaries, but made few serious efforts at substantive reform.

In the United Kingdom, the campaign was led by the activist and pamphleteer E. D. Morel after 1900, whose book Red Rubber (1906) reached a mass audience. Notable members of the campaign included the novelists Mark Twain, Joseph Conrad and Arthur Conan Doyle as well as Belgian socialists such as Emile Vandervelde. In May 1903 a debate in the British House of Commons led to the passing of a resolution in condemnation of the Congo Free State. Soon after, the British consul in the town of Boma, Roger Casement, began touring the Congo to investigate the true extent of the abuses. He delivered his report in December, and a revised version was forwarded to the Free State authorities in February 1904.

In an attempt to preserve the Congo's labour force and stifle British criticism, Leopold promoted attempts to combat disease to give the impression that he cared about the welfare of the Congolese and invited experts from the Liverpool School of Tropical Medicine to assist. Free State officials also defended themselves against allegations that exploitative policies were causing severe population decline in the Congo by attributing the losses to smallpox and sleeping sickness. Campaigning groups such as the Congo Reform Association did not oppose colonialism and instead sought to end the excesses of the Free State by encouraging Belgium to annex the colony officially. This would avoid damaging the delicate balance of power between France and Britain on the continent. While supporters of the Free State regime attempted to argue against claims of atrocities, a Commission of Enquiry, appointed by the regime in 1904, confirmed the stories of atrocities and pressure on the Belgian government increased.

In 1908, as a direct result of this campaign, Belgium formally annexed the territory, creating the Belgian Congo. Conditions for the indigenous population improved dramatically with the partial suppression of forced labour, although many officials who had formerly worked for the Free State were retained in their posts long after annexation. Instead of mandating labour for colonial enterprises directly, the Belgian administration used a coercive tax that deliberately pressured Congolese to find work with European employers to procure the necessary funds to make the payments. For some time after the end of the Free State the Congolese were also required to provide a certain number of days of service per year for infrastructure projects.

== Historiography and the term "genocide" ==
... It was indeed a holocaust before Hitler's Holocaust. ... What happened in the heart of Africa was genocidal in scope long before that now familiar term, genocide, was ever coined.

— Historian Robert Weisbord (2003)

The significant number of deaths under the Free State regime has led some scholars to relate the atrocities to later genocides, though understanding of the losses under the colonial administration's rule as the result of harsh economic exploitation rather than a policy of deliberate extermination has led others to dispute the comparison; there is an open debate as to whether the atrocities constitute genocide. According to the United Nations' 1948 definition of the term "genocide", a genocide must be "acts committed with intent to destroy, in whole or in part, a national, ethnical, racial or religious group". According to Georgi Verbeeck, this conventional definition of genocide has prevented most historians from using the term to describe atrocities in the Free State; in the strict sense of the term, some historians have rejected allegations of genocide.

Sociologist Rhoda Howard-Hassmann stated that because the Congolese were not killed in a systematic fashion according to this criterion, "technically speaking, this was not genocide even in a legally retroactive sense." Adam Hochschild and political scientist Georges Nzongola-Ntalaja rejected allegations of genocide in the Free State because there was no evidence of a policy of deliberate extermination or the desire to eliminate any specific population groups, though the latter added that nevertheless there was "a death toll of Holocaust proportions", which led him to call it "the Congo holocaust".

... no reputable historian of the Congo has made charges of genocide; a forced labor system, although it may be equally deadly, is different.

— Historian Adam Hochschild (2005)

It is generally agreed by historians that extermination was never the policy of the Free State. According to David Van Reybrouck, "It would be absurd ... to speak of an act of 'genocide' or a 'holocaust'; genocide implies the conscious, planned annihilation of a specific population, and that was never the intention here, or the result ... But it was definitely a hecatomb, a slaughter on a staggering scale that was not intentional, but could have been recognised much earlier as the collateral damage of a perfidious, rapacious policy of exploitation". Historian Barbara Emerson stated, "Leopold did not start genocide. He was greedy for money and chose not to interest himself when things got out of control." According to Hochschild, "while not a case of genocide, in the strict sense", the atrocities in the Congo were "one of the most appalling slaughters known to have been brought about by human agency". (Note: As a comparison, Hochschild labelled the German extermination of the Herero in South-West Africa (1904–1907) a genocide because of its defined, systematic and intentional nature.)

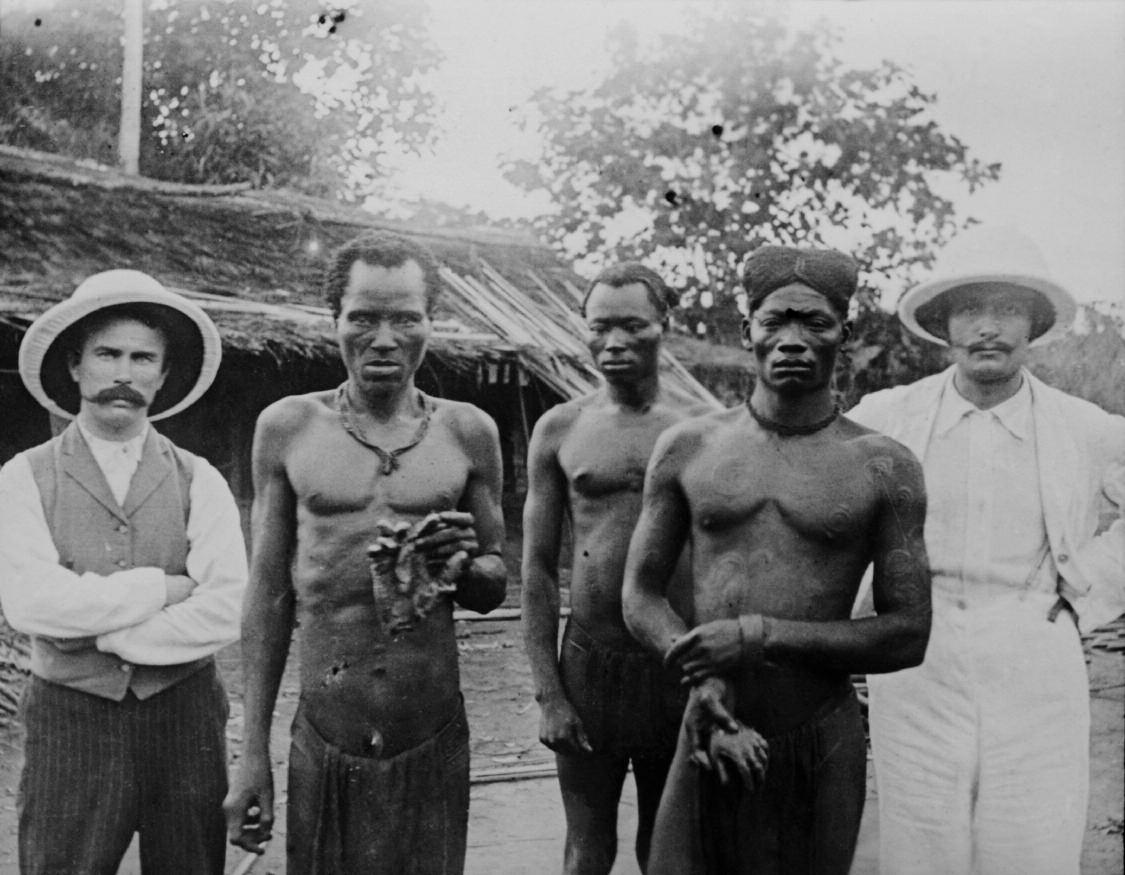
Picture of "Congolese men holding cut off hands" captured by Alice Seeley Harris in Baringa, May 1904

Historians have argued that comparisons drawn in the press by some between the death toll of the Free State atrocities and the Holocaust during World War II have been responsible for creating undue confusion over the issue of terminology. In one incident, the Japanese newspaper Yomiuri Shimbun used the word "genocide" in the title of a 2005 article by Hochschild. Hochschild himself criticised the title as "misleading" and stated that it had been chosen "without my knowledge". Similar criticism was echoed by historian Jean-Luc Vellut.

Allegations of genocide in the Free State have become common over time. Martin Ewans wrote, "Leopold's African regime became a byword for exploitation and genocide." According to historian Timothy J. Stapleton, "Those who easily apply the term genocide to Leopold's regime seem to do so purely on the basis of its obvious horror and the massive numbers of people who may have perished." Robert Weisbord argued that there does not have to be intent to exterminate all members of a population in a genocide. He posited that "an endeavor to eliminate a portion of a people would qualify as genocide" according to the UN standards and asserted that the Free State did as much. Jeanne Haskin, Yaa-Lengi Meema Ngemi, and David Olusoga also referred to the atrocities as a genocide.

In an unpublished manuscript from the 1950s, Lemkin, who had first coined the term "genocide" in 1944, asserted the occurrence of "an unambiguous genocide" in the Free State, though he blamed the violence on what he saw as "the savagery of African colonial troops". Lemkin emphasised that the atrocities were usually committed by Africans themselves who were in the pay of the Belgians. These "native militia" were described by Lemkin as "an unorganized and disorderly rabble of savages whose only recompense was what they obtained from looting, and when they were cannibals, as was usually the case, in eating the foes against whom they were sent". Genocide scholar Adam Jones claimed that the underrepresentation of males in Congolese population figures after Leopold's rule is evidence that "outright genocide" was the cause of a large portion of deaths in the Free State.

In 1999 Hochschild published King Leopold's Ghost, a book detailing the atrocities committed during the Free State's existence. The book became a bestseller in Belgium, but aroused criticism from former Belgian colonialists and some academics as exaggerating the extent of the atrocities and population decline. Around the 50th anniversary of the Congo's independence from Belgium in 2010, numerous Belgian writers published content about the Congo. Historian Idesbald Goddeeris criticised these works—including Van Reybrouk's Congo: A History—for taking a softened stance on the atrocities committed in the Congolese Free State, saying "They acknowledge the dark period of the Congo Free State, but ... they emphasize that the number of victims was unknown and that the terror was concentrated in particular regions."

The term "Congolese genocide" is also used to refer to the mass murder and rape committed in the eastern Congo in the aftermath of the Rwandan genocide (and the ensuing Second Congo War) between 1998 and 2003.

== Legacy ==
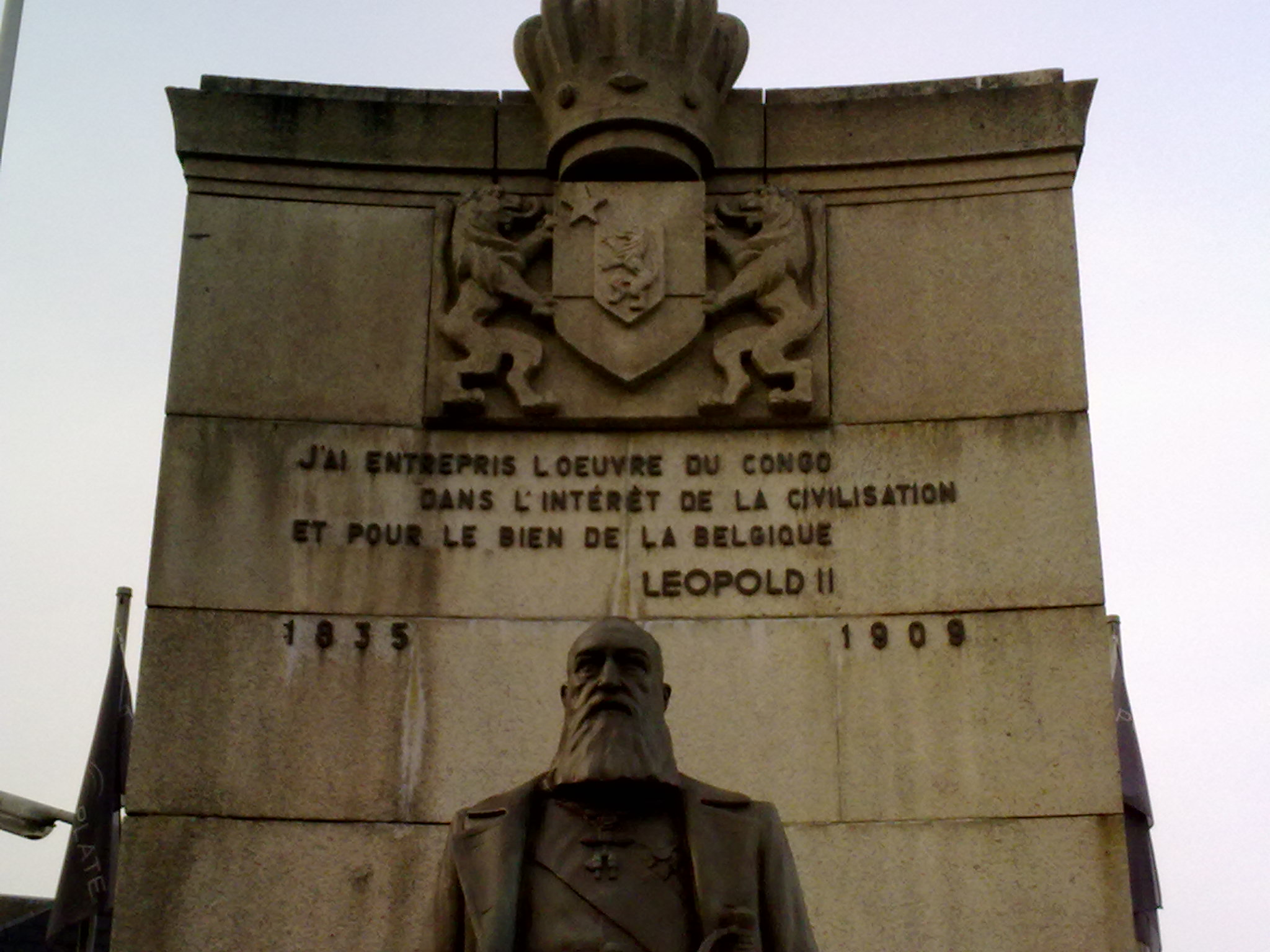
Monument of colonial propaganda to Leopold II in Arlon, southern Belgium, erected in 1951: "I undertook the work of the Congo in the interest of civilisation and for the good of Belgium."

The legacy of the population decline of Leopold's reign left the subsequent colonial government with a severe labour shortage and it often had to resort to mass migrations to provide workers to emerging businesses.

The atrocities of the era generated public debate about Leopold, his specific role in them, and his legacy. Belgian crowds booed at his funeral in 1909 to express their dissatisfaction with his rule of the Congo. Attention to the Congo atrocities subsided in the years after Leopold's death, although his appearance in The Congo by Vachel Lindsay, that poet's best known work, memorialized those atrocities:

Listen to the yell of Leopold's ghost
Burning in Hell for his hand-maimed host.
Hear how the demons chuckle and yell
Cutting his hands off, down in Hell.

Statues of Leopold were erected in the 1930s at the initiative of his nephew Albert I, while the Belgian government celebrated his accomplishments in Belgium. The release of Hochschild's King Leopold's Ghost in 1999 briefly reignited debate in Belgium, which resurfaced periodically over the following 20 years. In 2005, an early day motion before the British House of Commons, introduced by Andrew Dismore, called for the recognition of the Congo Free State's atrocities as a "colonial genocide" and called on the Belgian government to issue a formal apology. It was supported by 48 MPs.

Statues of Leopold in the Congo, which became independent in 1960, were relocated to the national museum. One was, however, briefly reinstated in Kinshasa in 2005. In 2020, following the murder of George Floyd in the United States and the subsequent protests, numerous statues of Leopold II in Belgium were vandalised as a criticism of the atrocities of his rule in the Congo. Several petitions called for the removal of the statues in Belgium and had tens of thousands of signees. Other petitions, also signed by tens of thousands of Belgians, called for the statues to remain.

On 30 June 2020, the 60th anniversary of Congolese independence, King Philippe sent a letter to Congolese President Félix Tshisekedi, expressing his "deepest regret" for "acts of violence and cruelty" committed during the existence of the Free State and other transgressions that occurred during the colonial period, but did not explicitly mention Leopold's role in the atrocities. Some activists accused him of not making a full apology.

== See also ==
- Brussels Anti-Slavery Conference 1889–90
- Brussels Conference Act of 1890
- Casement Report
- Genocide of indigenous peoples
- Genocides in history (before World War I)
- The King Incorporated
- Jules Marchal (1924–2003) (aka A. M. Delathuy), Belgian ambassador and CFS historian.
- Peruvian Amazon Company – a company whose rubber-related atrocities in South America were widely compared to those in the Congo Free State
- Putumayo genocide
- Royal Museum for Central Africa
- Nsala of Wala in the Nsongo District

== General and cited references ==
- Anstey, Roger (1971). "The Congo Rubber Atrocities – A Case Study". African Historical Studies. 4 (1): 59–76. doi:10.2307/216268. JSTOR 216268.
- Ascherson, Neal (1999). The King Incorporated: Leopold the Second and the Congo (New ed.). London: Granta. ISBN 1-86207-290-6.
- "Democratic Republic of the Congo". World Without Genocide. 2012. Archived from the original on 15 July 2015.
- Drumond, Paula (2011). "Invisible Males: The Congolese Genocide". In Jones, Adam (ed.). New Directions in Genocide Research. Routledge. pp. 96–112. ISBN 978-0-415-49597-4.
- "Early day motion 2251". Houses of Parliament. Archived from the original on 24 August 2018.
- Ewans, Martin (2017). European Atrocity, African Catastrophe: Leopold II, the Congo Free State and its Aftermath. Routledge. ISBN 978-1317849070.
- Gibbs, David N. (1991). The Political Economy of Third World Intervention: Mines, Money, and U.S. Policy in the Congo Crisis. American Politics and Political Economy. Chicago: University of Chicago Press. ISBN 978-0226290713. Archived from the original on 16 January 2023.
- Goddeeris, Idesbald (2015). "Postcolonial Belgium: The Memory of the Congo". International Journal of Postcolonial Studies. 17 (3): 434–51. doi:10.1080/1369801X.2014.998253. S2CID 163672254.
- Hochschild, Adam (1999). King Leopold's Ghost: A Story of Greed, Terror, and Heroism in Colonial Africa (1st ed.). Boston: Houghton Mifflin. ISBN 978-0-618-00190-3.
- Hochschild, Adam (6 October 2005). "In the Heart of Darkness". New York Review of Books. 52 (15). Archived from the original on 14 November 2015.
- Lyons, Maryinez (1992). The Colonial Disease: A Social History of Sleeping Sickness in Northern Zaire, 1900–1940. Cambridge: Cambridge University Press. ISBN 0-521-40350-2.
- Nzongola-Ntalaja, Georges (2007). The Congo, From Leopold to Kabila: A People's History (3rd ed.). New York: Palgrave. ISBN 978-1-84277-053-5.
- Pakenham, Thomas (1992). The Scramble for Africa: the White Man's Conquest of the Dark Continent from 1876 to 1912. London: Abacus. ISBN 978-0-349-10449-2.
- Provost, René; Akhavan, Payam, eds. (2010). Confronting Genocide. Springer Science & Business Media. ISBN 978-9048198405.
- Renton, David; Seddon, David; Zeilig, Leo (2007). The Congo: Plunder and Resistance. London: Zed Books. ISBN 978-1-84277-485-4.
- Schaller, Dominik (2005). "Raphael Lemkin's view of European colonial rule in Africa: between condemnation and admiration" (PDF). Journal of Genocide Research. 7 (4): 538. doi:10.1080/14623520500349977. ISSN 1469-9494. S2CID 36915506. Archived from the original (PDF) on 12 December 2019.
- Simon, Thomas W. (2007). The Laws of Genocide: Prescriptions for a Just World. PSI Reports. Praeger. ISBN 978-0275979454.
- Slade, Ruth M. (1962). King Leopold's Congo: Aspects of the Development of Race Relations in the Congo Independent State. Institute of Race Relations. Oxford: Oxford University Press. OCLC 655811695.
- Stapleton, Timothy J. (2017). A History of Genocide in Africa. Praeger (ABC-CLIO). ISBN 978-1440830525.
- Stengers, Jean (1969). "The Congo Free State and the Belgian Congo before 1914". In Gann, L. H.; Duignan, Peter (eds.). Colonialism in Africa, 1870–1914. Vol. I. Cambridge: Cambridge University Press. pp. 261–292.
- Vangroenweghe, Daniël [in Dutch] (2006). "The 'Leopold II' concession system exported to French Congo with as example the Mpoko Company" (PDF). Revue belge d'Histoire contemporaine-Belgisch Tijdschrift voor Nieuwste Geschiedenis. 36 (3–4): 323–372. Archived (PDF) from the original on 11 October 2016.
- Van Reybrouck, David (2014). Congo: The Epic History of a People. London: Fourth Estate. ISBN 978-0-00-756290-9.
- Vansina, Jan (2010). Being Colonized: The Kuba Experience in Rural Congo, 1880–1960. Madison: University of Wisconsin Press. ISBN 978-0-299-23644-1.
- Vanthemsche, Guy (2012). Belgium and the Congo, 1885–1980. New York: Cambridge University Press. ISBN 978-0-521-19421-1.
- Vellut, Jean-Luc (12 January 2006). "Response to 'In the Heart of Darkness'". New York Review of Books. 53 (1).
- Verbeeck, Georgi (2020). "Legacies of an imperial past in a small nation. Patterns of postcolonialism in Belgium". European Politics and Society. 21 (3): 292–306. doi:10.1080/23745118.2019.1645422. ISSN 2374-5118. S2CID 201454642.
- Weisbord, Robert (2003). "Response to 'The King, the Cardinal and the Pope: Leopold II's genocide in the Congo and the Vatican'". Journal of Genocide Research. 5 (1): 35–45. doi:10.1080/14623520305651. S2CID 73371517.
