= Bury the Chains =

Book by Adam Hochschild

- The front cover of the first edition (hardcover)
- Author: Adam Hochschild
- Language: English
- Subject: Abolitionism in the United Kingdom
- Genre: Non-fiction; Narrative history
- Publisher: Houghton Mifflin Harcourt (US); Macmillan Publishers (UK)
- Publication date: January 7, 2005
- Publication place: United States
- Media type: Print (hardcover and paperback), e-book
- Pages: 480 (2005 US edition)
- Awards: Los Angeles Times Book Prize for History (2005); Lionel Gelber Prize (2006)
- ISBN: 978-0-618-10469-7
- OCLC: 61299662

Bury the Chains: Prophets and Rebels in the Fight to Free an Empire's Slaves is a non-fiction book by Adam Hochschild that was first published by Houghton Mifflin on January 7, 2005. The book is a narrative history of the late 18th- and early 19th-century anti-slavery movement in the British Empire. The story centers around a group of British abolitionist campaigners and traces their campaign from its beginnings with Somerset v Stewart in 1772 until all slaves in Britain's colonies was fully emancipated by 1838. The book looks at the setbacks the abolitionists faced as well as the campaign tactics they used, and explains how they were ultimately able to abolish slavery in the British Empire.

The book came about from Hochschild's initial idea to write a biography on John Newton, a slave trader turned abolitionist. Further research into Newton's life drew Hochschild into the abolitionist movement as a whole instead and introduced him to English abolitionist Thomas Clarkson. Clarkson, whose often overlooked contributions Hochschild wanted to highlight, serves as the book's central figure.

Bury the Chains was generally well received by critics. Its narrative was praised for being compelling and uplifting, while a few reviewers felt it lacked depth and that Hochschild's political leanings clouded his writing. The book won several literary awards, including the 2005 Los Angeles Times Book Prize for History and the 2006 Lionel Gelber Prize. According to The New Republic, the book has inspired modern-day climate change activists who see parallels between the antislavery and climate change campaigns.

== Background and development ==
Adam Hochschild is an American author and co-founder of the progressive American magazine Mother Jones. Much of his writing focuses on historical social injustices and the individuals who campaigned to end them. Hochschild said of the overarching theme in his work: "To me there's nothing more interesting than trying to evoke moments when men and women risked their lives to battle horrendous injustice [...] It's hard for me to imagine spending four or five years working on a book if there isn't some pressing moral issue at the core of the story." A popular historian, Hochschild has stated that his intention is not to provide new analyses of historical events with his books, but rather "to bring a period of time alive by focusing on 10 or 12 people who lived through it, and whose lives intersected in some way." Hochschild's other books include the acclaimed King Leopold's Ghost, an account of the colonial atrocities committed in the Belgian Congo; The Unquiet Ghost: Russians Remember Stalin, an account of the effects of Joseph Stalin's dictatorship on contemporary Russians; and Spain in Our Hearts, an account of the American volunteers who participated in the Spanish Civil War.

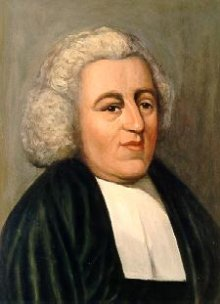
John Newton, a slave trader turned abolitionist, was the original inspiration for Bury the Chains

Bury the Chains came about from Hochschild's initial idea to write a biography on John Newton, known for writing the hymn "Amazing Grace". Newton's personal transformation from a slave trader to an abolitionist had long intrigued him. However, a few months into researching Newton's life, Hochschild came to the realization that "the story was the movement and not Newton." His research into Newton's life also introduced Hochschild to abolitionist campaigner Thomas Clarkson, who became the central figure in Bury the Chains. Hochschild observed that Clarkson's contributions to the abolitionist campaign was often overlooked in favor of William Wilberforce's. According to him, Clarkson was "by far the more interesting figure" who "really got shortchanged by history," and Hochschild wanted to correct this. Hochschild was also drawn to write about the British antislavery movement upon learning that many of the methods used by modern-day advocacy groups were pioneered by the British abolitionists, including boycotts, political book tours, direct mail fundraising, newsletters, petitions, campaign posters and buttons, and the concept of setting up national organizations with local branches around the country.

Having known little about the subject when he started working on this book, it took Hochschild four years of research and writing to complete it. (Note: 42:30 minutes in.) He conducted a lot of his research for the book in libraries, particularly the University of California, Berkeley Libraries and the Stanford University Libraries. Hochschild's research also took him to England and western Jamaica to visit places where events in the book occurred. In England, he visited 2 George Yard in London, the address of the bookstore where the abolitionists held their meetings, now the location of a modern skyscraper. In Jamaica, Hochschild visited the area where the slave rebellions took place so as to search for the remains of old sugar plantations.

=== Title ===
The book's title came from a story of a group of slaves in the town of Falmouth, Jamaica, who immediately following the emancipation of slaves in the British Empire on August 1, 1838, placed their slave whip and chains in a coffin and buried the coffin in a Baptist churchyard. (Note: 39:22 minutes in.)

== Content ==
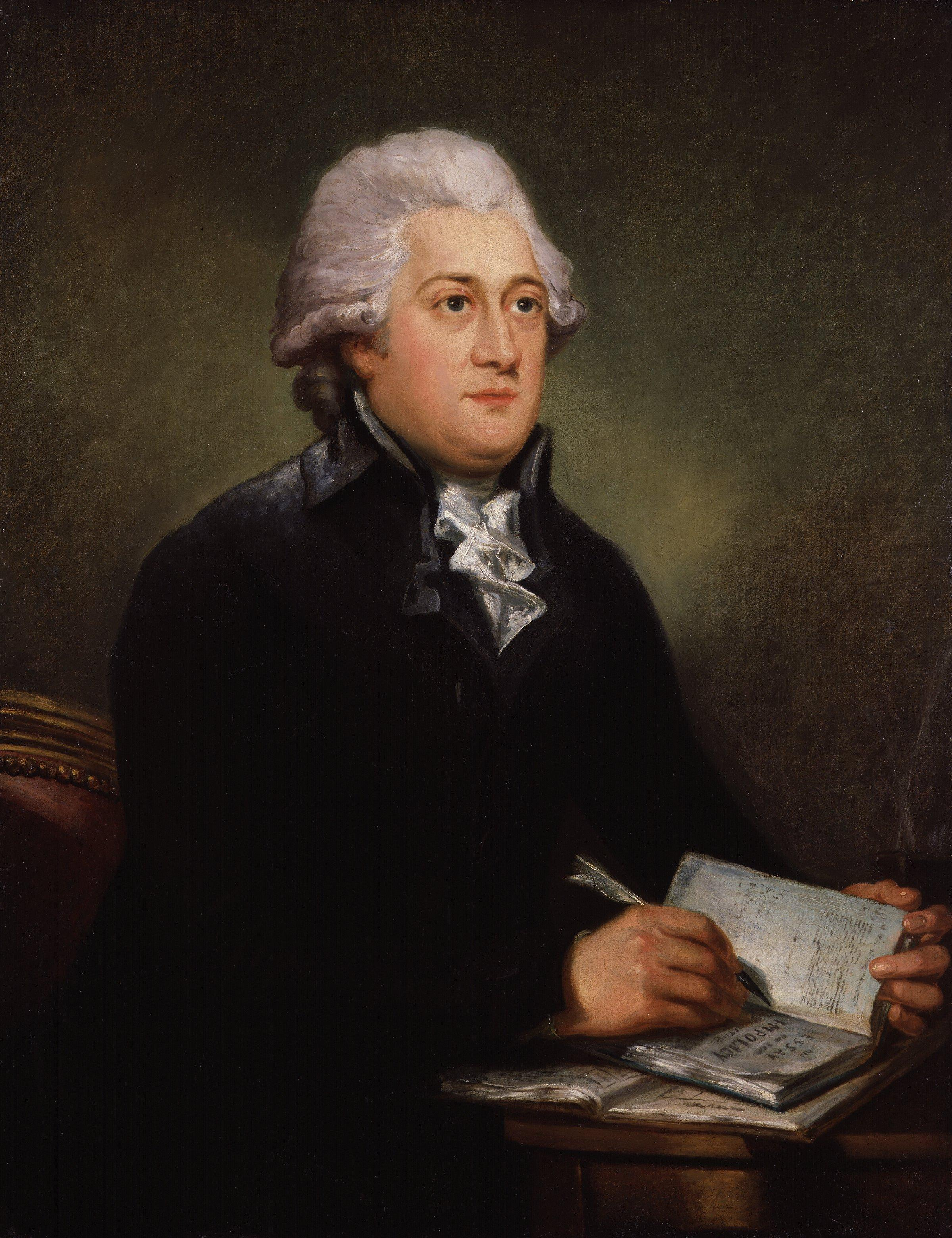
Thomas Clarkson, a leading campaigner against the slave trade in the British Empire, is the book's central figure

Bury the Chains is a narrative history of the antislavery movement in the United Kingdom. It follows a group of British abolitionist activists and chronicles their successful campaign to end slavery in the British Empire. The group includes Granville Sharp, an unconventional civil libertarian; Thomas Clarkson, a University of Cambridge graduate who dedicated his life to the antislavery campaign; John Newton, a former slave ship captain turned Evangelical preacher; William Wilberforce, an English politician and close friend of British Prime Minister William Pitt the Younger; and Olaudah Equiano, a former slave who bought his freedom and became an abolitionist writer.

The book starts out with an overview of 18th-century Britain's relationship with slavery. Hochschild then details the start of the antislavery campaign in England, from Sharp's advocacy of Black slave James Somerset in the 1772 case Somerset v Stewart to the establishment of Granville Town, Province of Freedom in 1787. After that, Clarkson serves as the book's central figure. Hochschild recounts how as a student at the University of Cambridge, Clarkson became so appalled by the slave trade while researching the topic for his prize-winning antislavery essay that he dedicated the rest of his life to the antislavery movement. Clarkson later found allies for his cause in the Quakers, one of whom, bookstore and printing shop owner James Phillips, agreed to publish his antislavery essay. The Society for Effecting the Abolition of the Slave Trade was thus formed in May 1787 with both Clarkson and Sharp as founding members, holding meetings in Phillips's bookstore.

Hochschild covers "the bleak decade" from 1792 to 1802, when the French Revolutionary Wars and Haitian Revolution initially set the British antislavery campaign back. Even then, the campaign continued to gain ground thanks to an effective boycott of slave-produced sugar, and the advocacy of men such as army officer George Pinckard and painter William Blake. Hochschild acknowledges the crucial role of women's societies and women activists such as Elizabeth Heyrick. These societies circulated antislavery publications and petitions, raised funds for the campaign, spoke out against slavery at public meetings, and led the sugar boycott, refusing to patronize bakers and shopkeepers who used and sold slave-produced sugar.

Hochschild explains how the Slave Trade Act 1807 came about not just through activism alone, but also as a result of national rhetoric and economic warfare against France, whose ruler Napoleon had restored slavery in French colonies. Hochschild explains that the Slavery Abolition Act 1833, which banned slavery in Britain and its colonies, only became possible thanks to the Reform Act 1832 which saw the abolition of rotten and pocket boroughs in the British House of Commons. Hochschild notes that many abolitionists were upset with the act as it provided compensation for slave owners. The Abolition Act took legal effect on August 1, 1838, granting full emancipation for all slaves in the British Empire.

== Reception ==
=== Critical response ===
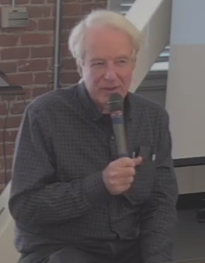
Adam Hochschild in 2017

Hochschild does not gloss over the brutalities of slavery which can make the book difficult to read. Despite its dark subject matter, some reviewers commended Hochschild's account for being an ultimately "inspiring" one, focused on the courage of the abolitionists and celebrating their achievements. On the other hand, the Chicago Reader observed that in its attempt to be "uplifting", the book intentionally glosses over some of the less appealing implications of the abolitionist campaign. Publishers Weekly disagreed, giving Hochschild credit for highlighting the abolitionists' own shortcomings and mistakes.

Among the few lukewarm reviews, the Chicago Reader was critical of what they perceived to be Hochschild's liberal beliefs clouding his objectivity as well as his dismissive attitude towards Christianity, particularly toward John Newton, who continued to captain slave ships after his conversion to Christianity. Academic journals were also not as receptive to the book. Reviewers in the Journal of Social History and the Journal of British Studies felt that Hochschild's anecdotal approach limits the book's ability to explain issues with greater depth. While the former still considered the book "a brilliant distillation of the most recent generation of scholarly research," the latter felt that even as a work of popular history, Bury the Chains could have been "more nuanced and sophisticated".

Reviewers agreed that Hochschild's intent in writing Bury the Chains was to use the successful British abolitionist movement to inspire contemporary activists and provide them with a model from which to emulate. The New York Times's Marilynne Robinson felt his intent was an "honorable one", while NPR's Maureen Corrigan selected the book as one of her favorites of 2005 and commended it for advancing the work of the abolitionists in "lifting our moral blindness."

Bury the Chains received many positive reviews for its compelling and witty narrative, which according to The Daily Telegraph's Max Hastings, "never fails to hold the reader's attention." While most reviewers enjoyed Hochschild's "vivid" writing, the Chicago Reader called it "ingratiating" and the Journal of Social History felt it sometimes "descends into silliness".

=== Accolades ===
Bury the Chains won the 2005 Los Angeles Times Book Prize for History, the gold medal for Nonfiction at the 2005 California Book Awards, the 2006 PEN Center USA Literary Award in the Research Nonfiction category, and the 2006 Lionel Gelber Prize. The book was also a finalist for the 2005 National Book Award for Nonfiction and long-listed for the 2005 Samuel Johnson Prize (now the Baillie Gifford Prize).

=== Climate change activists ===
According to The New Republic, the book has inspired modern-day climate change activists who see historical analogies between the antislavery and climate change movements. Andrew Hoffman, a scholar of environmental issues, asserted that the climate change campaign requires a drastic and collective change in the public's beliefs to be successful, similar to the challenge and moral dilemma faced by the abolitionists as described in Hochschild's account. A reviewer for the journal Climatic Change wrote that Hochschild's book can give "perspective and inspiration for today's activist."

Adam Hochschild, in 2017, on interest in his book by climate change activists

Hochschild has been very pleased by the interest Bury the Chains has received from environmental groups, (Note: 36:50 minutes in, 47:12 minutes in.) noting that it is crucial for contemporary activists to learn about past movements that were successful. (Note: 48:00 minutes in.) He suggests that the main lessons climate change activists can learn from the British abolitionists are the importance of building coalitions of people from diverse backgrounds and beliefs, and the need for effective campaign messaging. (Note: 33:50 minutes in.)
