= Spain in Our Hearts =

Book by Adam Hochschild

- The front cover of the first edition (hardcover)
- Author: Adam Hochschild
- Language: English
- Subject: Spanish Civil War
- Publisher: Houghton Mifflin Harcourt
- Publication date: March 29, 2016
- Publication place: United States
- Media type: Print (hardcover and paperback), e-book
- Pages: 464 (2016 US edition)
- ISBN: 978-0-547-97318-0
- OCLC: 913924490

Spain in Our Hearts: Americans in the Spanish Civil War, 1936–1939 is a non-fiction book by Adam Hochschild that was first published by Houghton Mifflin Harcourt on March 29, 2016. The book is an account of the American volunteers who participated in the Spanish Civil War from 1936 to 1939. The story centers around several American volunteer fighters and journalists, tracing their motivations for joining the war and their experiences during the war which left many disillusioned. The book explains the involvement of foreign leaders including Adolf Hitler, Benito Mussolini and Joseph Stalin, and explains why the Republican faction ultimately lost.

Hochschild knew several American volunteers personally, and was partly inspired by them to write the book. Most of Hochschild's archival research on the subject was carried out at the Tamiment Library and Robert F. Wagner Archives.

Spain in Our Hearts was generally well received by critics. Hochschild's writing in particular, was praised for being compelling and well-researched. Many reviewers also commended the book's balanced perspective that covers the atrocities committed by both factions in the war. In his lukewarm review, William Deresiewicz felt that the book did not provide adequate context for the war, leaving many of the questions the book raises unanswered.

== Background and development ==
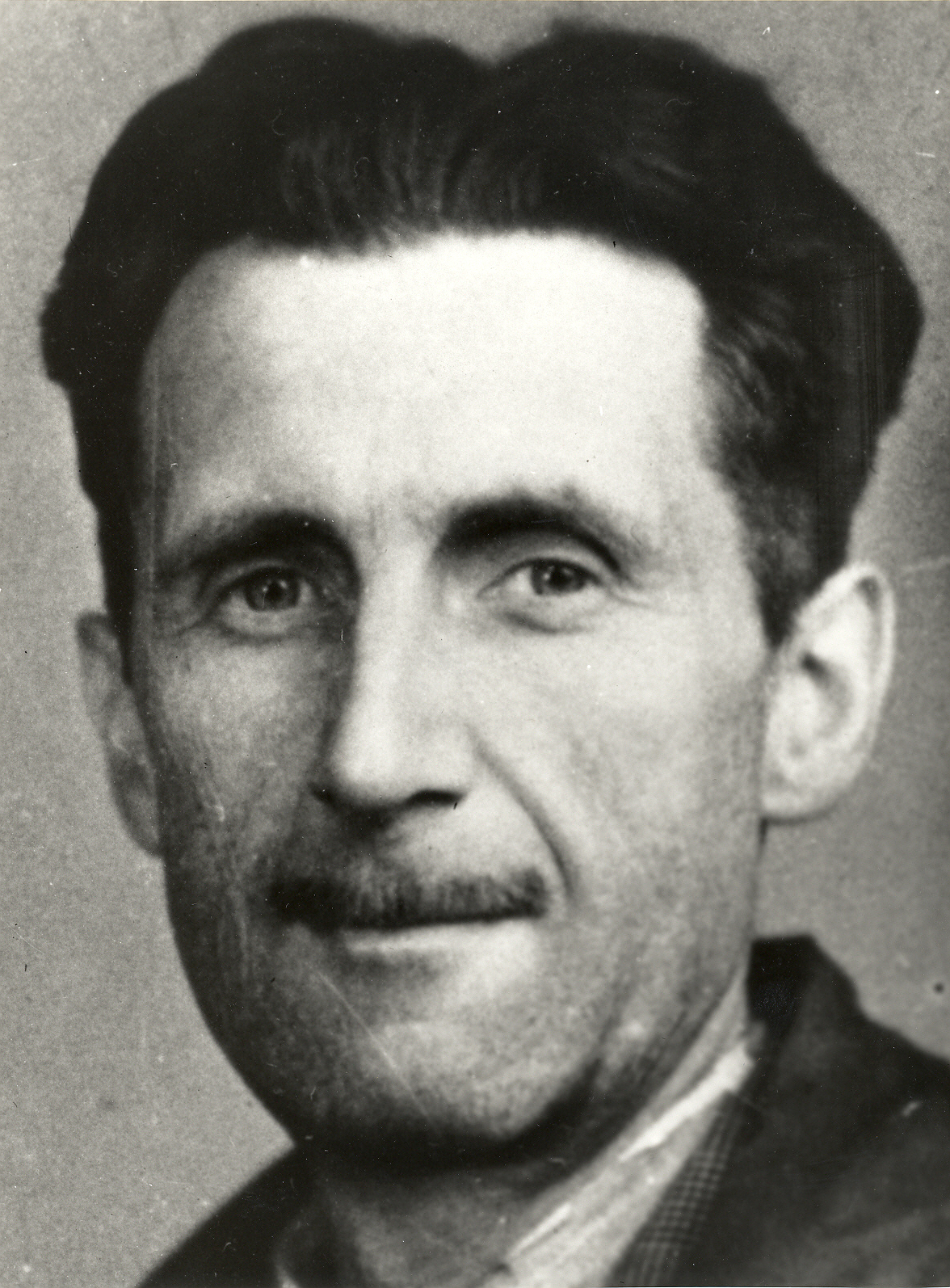
George Orwell's (pictured) Homage to Catalonia spurred Hochschild's interest in the Spanish Civil War

Adam Hochschild is an American author and co-founder of the progressive American magazine Mother Jones. Much of his writing focuses on historical social injustices and the individuals who campaigned to end them. Hochschild said of the overarching theme in his work: "To me there's nothing more interesting than trying to evoke moments when men and women risked their lives to battle horrendous injustice [...] It's hard for me to imagine spending four or five years working on a book if there isn't some pressing moral issue at the core of the story." A popular historian, Hochschild has stated that his intention is not to provide new analyses of historical events with his books, but rather "to bring a period of time alive by focusing on 10 or 12 people who lived through it, and whose lives intersected in some way." Hochschild's previous books include the acclaimed King Leopold's Ghost, an account of the colonial atrocities committed in the Belgian Congo; The Unquiet Ghost: Russians Remember Stalin, an account of the effects of Joseph Stalin's dictatorship on contemporary Russians; and Bury the Chains, an account of the anti-slavery movement in the British Empire.

Hochschild was first drawn to write about the Spanish Civil War due to his personal associations with several Americans who had volunteered in the war. Hochschild's interest in the topic was deepened by his high regard for Homage to Catalonia, George Orwell's personal account of his experiences in the war, as well as Hochschild's observation that the war was the only time that many Americans had risked their lives in another nation's civil war.

Hochschild began his research for Spain in Our Hearts by spending months reading books and articles about the participation of American volunteers in the Spanish Civil War, so as to determine the main characters in his book. After narrowing down the focus of his book, Hochschild conducted extensive archival research, particularly at the Tamiment Library and Robert F. Wagner Archives, whose collection includes the writings of hundreds of the American volunteers. While visiting the Hoover Institution Library and Archives, Hochschild was introduced to the writings of Lois Orr who then became a major character in his book.

=== Title ===
The title for the book is taken from a quote by French philosopher Albert Camus on the Spanish Civil War: "Men of my generation have had Spain in our hearts. It was there that they learned ... that one can be right and yet be beaten, that force can vanquish spirit and that there are times when courage is not rewarded."

== Content ==
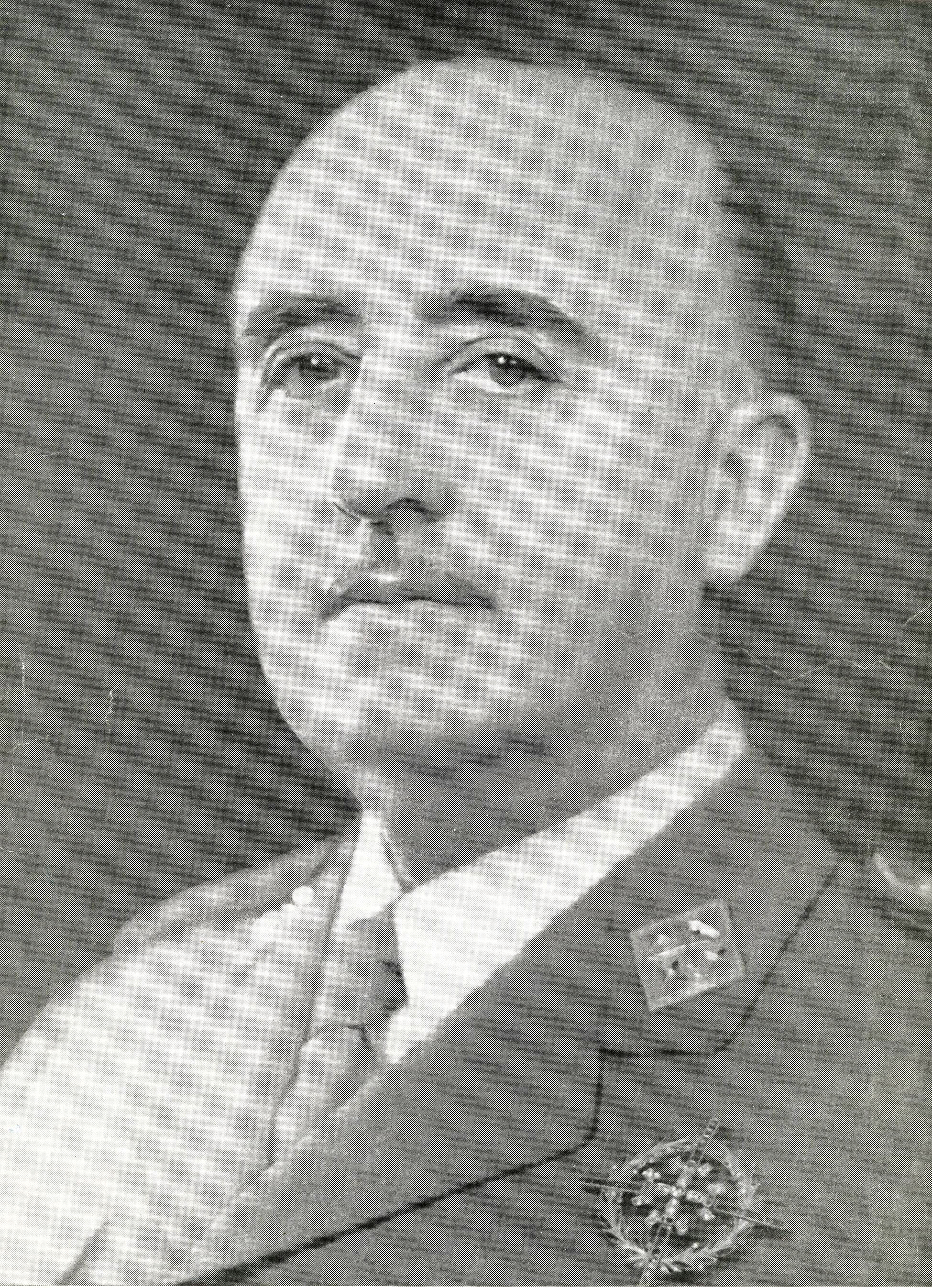
General Francisco Franco was the leader of the Nationalist faction

Spain in Our Hearts is an account of the American volunteers who participated in the Spanish Civil War. The civil war was fought between the left-leaning Republicans who were loyal to the democratically elected Second Spanish Republic, and the right-wing Nationalists who were led by General Francisco Franco. While the Nationalists were backed by foreign fascist leaders Adolf Hitler and Benito Mussolini, the Republicans were not supported by other Western democratic governments due to their communist-leaning ideologies. Despite this, many left-wing Americans volunteered to fight on the side of the Republicans, forming the Lincoln Battalion of the International Brigades. The book is told as a collective biography of several American volunteers and journalists, namely, Robert Hale Merriman, an Economics doctoral student who commandeered the Lincoln Battalion; Lois Orr, a member of the POUM female militia; and journalists Ernest Hemingway, Louis Fischer and Virginia Cowles. George Orwell, a British novelist and volunteer fighter in the POUM militia, and Jason Gurney, a British sculptor who fought in the International Brigades, are also major characters. Merriman serves as the central figure and the book begins with his disappearance during battle in April 1938.

Hochschild explains the motivations of the American volunteers, who fought on the side of the Republicans due to their opposition to fascism and their support of communism. Severely lacking in equipment and training, the Lincoln Battalion suffered heavy losses such as in the Battle of Brunete in 1937. While the Republicans received limited aid from Joseph Stalin's Soviet Union, the arms embargo that the United States, United Kingdom and France had imposed on Spain meant that they could not buy the weapons needed to fight against the Nationalists, who were being armed by Hitler's Germany and Mussolini's Italy. As such, Hochschild explains that many of the Republicans' attacks and strategies were not made for the purpose of direct victory, but instead were meant to convince Western powers to commit to supporting them.

Hochschild discusses the impact Texaco chairman, Torkild Rieber, had on the civil war. Rieber was sympathetic to fascist regimes and illegally supplied cheap oil on credit to the Nationalists in direct violation of the American arms embargo. Hochschild explains how Stalinists repressed the non-communist leftists and anti-Stalinist POUM members, which in turn disillusioned many of the American volunteers. George Orwell was inspired by the experience to write Homage to Catalonia, and anti-Stalinism was a key theme in his later works such as Animal Farm and Nineteen Eighty-Four.

Hochschild points out that Hitler and Mussolini used the Spanish Civil War to test out weapons and strategies that they would later employ in World War II. This includes the 1937 bombing of Guernica, which was among the first times new advancements in the technology of aerial bombing were put into practice. Hochschild concludes that Western intervention would have prevented the Nationalist victory in the civil war, but ultimately would not have prevented World War II. The book's final chapter details Merriman's death, with quotes from his widow's letters, and ends with an American woman travelling in 2012 to an old battleground site to honor her uncle's death in 1938.

== Critical response ==
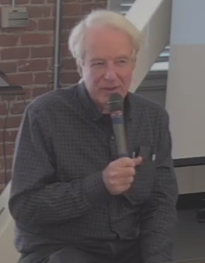
Adam Hochschild in 2017

Spain in Our Hearts received many positive reviews for its "exceptional" and "moving" narrative, particularly its prose that historian Michael Kazin described in The New York Times as "consistently vivid yet emotionally restrained." In a lukewarm review, Harper's Magazine's William Deresiewicz was critical of the book for not providing sufficient background and context to the war, citing its "rush narrative" that left many questions unanswered. Rich Benjamin, writing for The Guardian, felt that while the book sheds little new information about the war, overall, Hochschild provides new insight into the conflict through his gifted storytelling, deep knowledge of military history and "beautiful sense of private hurt." Other reviewers enjoyed the pace of the book and felt that it was well-researched.

Many reviewers also praised the book for providing a "nuanced" and "unromantic" perspective of the war that does not gloss over the atrocities both sides committed despite Hochschild's clear sympathy for the Republic's cause. The book's focus on the perspective of the American volunteers in an "often overlooked" conflict was described by Kazin as unique and by journalist Bob Drogin as "long-overdue". Hochschild's revelations on the little-known involvement of Texaco chairman Torkild Rieber in bankrolling the Nationalists was also commended. Author Kevin Baker wanted Hochschild to cover a wider perspective, but conceded that doing so would have meant losing the "shining courage and tenacity" that Hochschild evokes from his characters' personal stories. On the other hand, the World Socialist Web Site's reviewer considered Hochschild to have a poor grasp on the wider political issues surrounding the Spanish Civil War, asserting that the book perpetuates pro-Stalinist propaganda and understates the Republic's repression of POUM members.

The main characters, many of whom are little known, were considered compelling by reviewers. Hochschild's use of writings from the war–ranging from reports by writers such as Ernest Hemingway and André Malraux, to letters between Martha Gellhorn and Eleanor Roosevelt–was seen as a strength that enhanced the book. The Los Angeles Review of Books also gave Hochschild credit for "giv[ing] voice" to obscure writers through his comprehensive archival work that unyielded the previously unpublished writings of numerous American volunteers.

The New Republic was very complimentary of the book, declaring that it surpasses George Orwell's Homage to Catalonia as the "best introduction" to the Spanish Civil War written in English.
