= Jules Marchal =

Belgian diplomat and historian

- Born: 1924; Borgloon, Limburg Province, Belgium
- Died: 21 June 2003 (aged 78–79); Borgloon, Limburg Province, Belgium

Academic background
- Education: Catholic University of Louvain

Academic work
- Discipline: Popular history
- Main interests: Belgian colonial history
- Influenced: Adam Hochschild

Jules Marchal (1924 - 21 June 2003) was a Belgian diplomat and historian, who wrote extensively on the history of colonial exploitation in the Belgian Congo. Originally writing in Dutch, under the pseudonym A. M. Delathuy, he later published studies in French under his own name. Adam Hochschild, in his bestselling King Leopold's Ghost, praised Marchal's work as "the best scholarly overview by far, encyclopedic in scope".

In the mid-1970s, Marchal first read that it was believed in the Anglo-Saxon world that under Leopold II half of the native population had perished, approximately ten million people He went to do archival research to debunk this, but on the contrary he came across truths about the reign of terror that were previously unknown to him. Towards the end of his career, he began to publish a steady stream of bulky studies on the subject.

Marchal, for his part, considered the work of Belgian historians on the colonial period law-abiding and respectable. They avoided tricky issues, leaving the field empty for a non-academic like himself: "Everything I write is new. My books are based on archives that have never been consulted by anyone, never used by other historians. According to Marchal, this was the reason why Jan Vansina, approached by Hochschild with the question of whom to contact, did not refer him to classical authorities such as Jean Stengers or Jean-Luc Vellut, but to the outsider from Limburg. Vellut called Marchal's work "Grueulgeschichte [sic] in all its glory" and stated that its tireless author enumerated crime after crime but never came to an explanation.

== Works ==
- E. D. Morel tegen Leopold II en de Kongostaat, 1985. French edition, 1996.
- Jezuïeten in Kongo met zwaard en kruis, 1986
- De Kongostaat van Leopold II : het verloren paradijs, 1876-1900, 1988. French edition, 1992.
- De Geheime documentatie van de Onderzoekscommissie in de Kongostaat, 1988
- Missie en staat in Oud-Kongo, 1880-1914: witte paters, scheutisten en jezuïeten, 1992
- Forced Labor in the Gold and Copper Mines: A History of Congo under Belgian Rule, 1910-1945, 2003. Translated by Ayi Kwei Armah from the French Travail forcé pour le cuivre et pour l'or, 1999.
- Lord Leverhulme's Ghosts: Colonial Exploitation in the Congo, 2008. Translated by Martin Thom from the French Travail forcé pour l'huile de palme de Lord Leverhulme. Introduction by Adam Hochschild.
