= Barbara Emerson =

English historian and biographer

- Education: St. Hilda's College, Oxford
- Occupations: Historian and Biographer
- Spouse: Michael Emerson (div)

Barbara Emerson is an English historian and biographer, known for her biography of King Leopold II of Belgium. She was also a fellow of St Hilda's College, Oxford.

Emerson received her degree in PPE from St Hilda's College, Oxford where she later taught.

She was highly critical of Adam Hochschild's book King Leopold's Ghost, rebuking it in The Guardian as "a very shoddy piece of work."

== Works ==
- The Black Prince (1976)
- Leopold II of the Belgians: King of Colonialism (1979), translated into French as Léopold II, le royaume et l'empire (Éditions Duculot, 1980).
- Paul Delvaux (1985)
- The First Cold War: Anglo-Russian Relations in the 19th Century, Hurst Publishing, 2024
