= Masturbation: The History of a Great Terror =

1998 non-fiction work by Jean Stengers

Masturbation: The History of the Great Terror
- Author: Jean Stengers and Anne van Neck
- Original title: Histoire d'une grande peur, la masturbation
- Language: French
- Publisher: Pocket
- Publication date: 1998
- Publication place: France
- ISBN: 978-2266095563

Masturbation: The History of a Great Terror (originally titled Histoire d'une grande peur, la masturbation) is a history book by Jean Stengers and Anne van Neck. It details the fear and public beliefs about masturbation from the middle ages to the 19th century.
