= International Finance (journal) =

- Discipline: Finance, economics
- Language: English
- Edited by: Benn Steil

Publication details
- History: 1998-present
- Publisher: Wiley-Blackwell
- Frequency: Triannually
- Impact factor: 0.722 (2013)

Standard abbreviations
- ISO 4: Int. Finance

Indexing
- ISSN: 1367-0271 (print); 1468-2362 (web)
- OCLC no.: 905929260

Links
- Journal homepage; Online access; Online archive

International Finance is a peer-reviewed academic journal aimed at covering theory and policy in macroeconomics and finance. The first issue was published in October 1998. The founding editor-in-chief is Benn Steil (Council on Foreign Relations).
