= Benn Steil =

American economist and writer

- Education: Wharton School of the University of Pennsylvania BSc; Nuffield College, Oxford MPhil, DPhil
- Occupations: Economist; writer
- Employer: Council on Foreign Relations
- Title: Senior Fellow and Director of International Economics

Benn Steil is an American economist and writer. He serves as senior fellow and the director of international economics at the Council on Foreign Relations (CFR) in Manhattan, New York. He founded and edits the academic journal International Finance.

== Career ==
Steil joined the Council on Foreign Relations in 1999, where he directs its international economics program. He has written about international finance, monetary policy, the Cold War, and the history of economic institutions. He authors the Council’s Geo-Graphics blog. Before joining the CFR, Steil was director of the International Economics Programme at the Royal Institute of International Affairs (Chatham House) in London. Earlier, he held a Lloyd’s of London Tercentenary Research Fellowship at Nuffield College, Oxford, where he earned his MPhil and DPhil in economics. He received a BSc in economics from the Wharton School of the University of Pennsylvania.

Steil authored several books on economic history and policy including Financial Statecraft: The Role of Financial Markets in American Foreign Policy (2006, with Robert E. Litan), Money, Markets and Sovereignty (2009, with Manuel Hinds), The Battle of Bretton Woods (2013), The Marshall Plan: Dawn of the Cold War (2018), and The World That Wasn't: Henry Wallace and the Fate of the American Century (2024).

== Awards and honors ==
Steil has received several book prizes including:

- 2018 – Douglas Dillon Prize, American Academy of Diplomacy, for The Marshall Plan
- 2018 – New York Historical's Barbara and David Zalaznick Book Prize in American History for The Marshall Plan
- 2013 – Spear's Book Prize in Financial History for The Battle of Bretton Woods
- 2010 – Hayek Book Prize for Money, Markets, and Sovereignty

== Selected works ==
- The World That Wasn't: Henry Wallace and the Fate of the American Century (2024); ISBN 1982127821
- The Marshall Plan: Dawn of the Cold War (2018); ISBN 1501102370
- The Battle of Bretton Woods: John Maynard Keynes, Harry Dexter White, and the Making of a New World Order (2013)
- Money, Markets and Sovereignty (2009); with Manuel Hinds
- Financial Statecraft: The Role of Financial Markets in American Foreign Policy (2006); with Robert E. Litan
