= The Battle of Bretton Woods =

2013 non-fiction book by Benn Steil

- Author: Benn Steil
- Language: English
- Subject: Economics
- Published: 2013
- Publisher: Princeton University Press
- Awards: 2013 Spear's Book Award in Financial History; 2014 Bronze Medal in Economics, Axiom Business Book Awards
- ISBN: 9780691149097

The Battle of Bretton Woods: John Maynard Keynes, Harry Dexter White, and the Making of a New World Order is a 2013 non-fiction book by Benn Steil.

== Overview ==
The book covers the 1944 conference that established the architecture of the postwar international monetary system, leading to the establishment of the International Monetary Fund and the World Bank, the substance of the negotiations, and especially the roles of the key players, most notably the famous British economist John Maynard Keynes and Harry Dexter White, the U.S. Treasury official who led the American negotiating team. The book sheds light on how White got to dominate economic policy and was influential in the postwar economic order.
