= King Leopold's Ghost =

Book by Adam Hochschild

- Author: Adam Hochschild
- Language: English
- Publisher: Mariner Books
- Publication date: 1998
- Publication place: United States
- Media type: Print (Hardback & Paperback)

King Leopold's Ghost: A Story of Greed, Terror and Heroism in Colonial Africa (1998) is a best-selling popular history book by Adam Hochschild that explores the exploitation of the Congo Free State by King Leopold II of the Belgians between 1885 and 1908, as well as the large-scale atrocities committed during that period. The book, also a general biography of the private life of King Leopold, succeeded in increasing public awareness of these crimes in recent decades.

The book was refused by nine of the ten U.S. publishing houses to which an outline was submitted, but became an unexpected bestseller and won the prestigious Mark Lynton History Prize for literary style. It also won the 1999 Duff Cooper Prize. By 2013 more than 600,000 copies were in print in a dozen languages.

The book is the basis of a 2006 documentary film of the same name, directed by Pippa Scott and narrated by Don Cheadle.

== Title ==
The title is adopted from the 1914 poem "The Congo", by Illinois poet Vachel Lindsay. Condemning Leopold's actions, Lindsay wrote:

Listen to the yell of Leopold's ghost,
Burning in Hell for his hand-maimed host.
Hear how the demons chuckle and yell,
Cutting his hands off, down in Hell.

== Content ==
Leopold II, King of the Belgians, privately controlled and owned the Congo Free State from 1885 to 1908. In 1908, the vast territory was annexed by Belgium as a colony known as the Belgian Congo. King Leopold II used his personal control to strip the Congo Free State of vast amounts of wealth, largely in the form of ivory and rubber. These labor-intensive industries were serviced by slave labor, and the local peoples were forced to work through various means, including torture, imprisonment, maiming and terror. Christian missionaries and a handful of human rights organizers internationally publicized these atrocities. Slowly, various countries, including the United Kingdom and the United States of America, began to object to Leopold's tyranny with the result that the country's administration was transferred to Belgium. Little changed inside the country, however, until the ivory and rubber were exhausted.

European interest in the African continent can be traced back to the late 1400s, when the European explorer Diogo Cão sailed the west coast and saw the Congo River. By the 1860s, most African coastal regions were claimed as colonies of European powers, but the vast interior of the continent remained unknown to Europeans. Henry Morton Stanley, a complicated man and renowned explorer, ventured through much of that unknown during a descent of the Congo River. Leopold II, King of the Belgians, was fascinated with obtaining a colony and focused upon claiming the interior of Africa—the only unclaimed sizable geographic area. Moving within the European political paradigm existing in the early 1880s, Leopold gained international concessions and recognition for his personal claim to the Congo Free State.

His rule of the vast region was based on tyranny and terror. Under his direction, Stanley again visited the area and extracted favorable treaties from numerous local leaders. A road and, eventually, a rail line were developed from the coast to Leopoldville (present-day Kinshasa). A series of militarized outposts were established along the length of the Congo River, and imported paddle wheelers commenced regular river service. Native peoples were forced to gather ivory and transport it for export. Beginning c. 1890, rubber—originally manufactured from coagulated sap—became economically significant in international trade. The Congo was rich in rubber-producing vines, and Leopold transitioned his exploitative focus from dwindling ivory supplies to the burgeoning rubber market. Slavery, exploitation and the reign of terror continued and even increased.

Meanwhile, early missionaries and human rights advocates such as Roger Casement, E. D. Morel, George Washington Williams, and William Henry Sheppard began to circulate news of the widespread atrocities committed in the Congo under the official blessing of Leopold's administration. Women and children were imprisoned as hostages to force husbands and fathers to work. Flogging, starvation and torture were routine. Murder was common—tribes resisting enslavement were wiped out; administration officials expected to receive back a severed human hand for every bullet issued. Rape and sexual slavery were rampant. Workers failing to secure assigned quotas of rubber were routinely mutilated or tortured. Administration officials so completely dehumanized local peoples that at least one decorated his flower garden with a border of severed human heads. News of these atrocities brought slow, but powerful, international condemnation of Leopold's administration leading, eventually, to his assignment of the country to Belgian administration.

In November 1908, Belgium officially annexed the Congo Free State as a colony, henceforth called the Belgian Congo, and proclaimed a general sea-change in administrative policy. Actual change, however, was nearly imperceptible. The era of World War I shifted attention from atrocities in Africa to European trench warfare. In the post-war era, the global demand for reform was largely forgotten. However, commercial rubber tree farming had become firmly established and the collection of wild rubber became commercially insignificant, just as ivory supplies had been exhausted years earlier. Because of this, the slave labor industries of the Belgian Congo diminished in importance and atrocities became far less frequent. Finally, in 1960, the Congo gained independence.

== Scholarship ==
Hochschild cites the research of several historians, many of them Belgian. He refers especially to Jules Marchal, formerly a Belgian colonial civil servant and diplomat who (as Hochschild describes) spent twenty years trying to break Belgian silence about the massacres. The documentation was not easy to come by; the furnaces of the palace in Brussels are said to have spent more than a week burning incriminating papers before Leopold turned over his private Congo to the Belgian nation. For many years Belgian authorities prevented access to what remained of the archives, notably the accounts given by Congolese to the King's Commission.

Although few African scholars seriously question that large numbers died in Leopold's Congo, the subject remains a touchy one in Belgium itself. The country's Royal Museum for Central Africa, founded by Leopold II, mounted a special exhibition in 2005 about the colonial Congo; in an article in the New York Review of Books, Hochschild accused the museum of distortion and evasion. In 2018, however, the museum reopened after an extensive five-year renovation. Hochschild gave the results a partly favorable review.

Also in 2005, the American and British publishers of King Leopold's Ghost reissued the book with a new afterword by Hochschild in which he talks about the reactions to the book, the death toll, and events in the Congo since its publication.

== Reception ==
Hochschild has been praised by scholars and critics for his narrative. Jeremy Harding, writing in The New York Times, called it "a model account" that showed how the human rights abuses and human rights activism that resulted became a "template for modernity". Richard F. Hamilton, writing in The Washington Post, called it an excellent book to counteract "the great forgetting" of the Congo atrocities.

Hochschild's estimate of 10 million deaths is generally considered on the high range of possibilities. Isidore Ndaywel è Nziem, a Congolese scholar whose Histoire générale du Congo was published the same year as King Leopold's Ghost, estimated the death toll in the Free State era and its aftermath at roughly 13 million. But starting in 2008, Isidore Ndaywel revised his figures downward. In Nouvelle histoire du Congo: des origines à la République Démocratique, he estimated the 1880 population at 15 to 20 million, and calculated the population loss at 5 to 10 million people – occurring not over 23 years, but over a 50-year period (between 1880 and 1930) and driven by wide-ranging causes that went far beyond massacres alone.. Subsequently, in his 2010 work Histoire du Congo: des origines à nos jours, he concluded that a population drop of 5 to 10 million had taken place over a 45-year span.

According to Jean Stengers, and Etienne van de Walle, Aline Désesquelles and Jacques Houdaille, the 10 million number cited by Hochschild is extrapolated from a 1924 estimation of the population and from the opinion of a 1919 Belgian government official commission that the population had been halved since 1880.

While Hochschild has said that his intention was to tell the story in "a way that brings characters alive, that brings out the moral dimension, that lays bare a great crime and a great crusade", he was criticised for his overly moralistic dimension, and former Belgian officials deplored his comparison of Leopold with Adolf Hitler and Joseph Stalin. Belgian historian Jean Stengers commented, "Terrible things happened, but Hochschild is exaggerating. It is absurd to say so many millions died." Other historians have painted a picture similar to Hochschild's of the high death toll in Leopold's Congo, among them Jan Vansina, who appeared in the documentary based on the book, and the demographer Léon de Saint-Moulin.

However, Jan Vansina subsequently revised his estimates and distanced himself from Adam Hochschild's thesis. In Being Colonized: The Kuba Experience in Rural Congo, 1880-1960, published in 2010, Vansina emphasizes that the estimate of a 50% population reduction was based on flawed initial projections and on the inappropriate extrapolation of local data (from rubber-harvesting areas) to the entire Congolese territory. He concludes that in the absence of reliable censuses before in the 1920s, any attempt at precise quantification on a national scale remains a matter of conjecture.

Demographer Jean Paul Sanderson challenges Adam Hochschild's methodology, estimating the population decline in the Congo Free State at between 1 and 5 million, compared to the 10 million proposed by Hochschild. Relying on retroactive projections, Sanderson deems the initial 1885 population estimate of 20 million implausible. He attributes the decline to a combination of falling birth rates, epidemics, and violence, rather than exclusively to direct massacres.

Hochschild was also criticized by Barbara Emerson, the author of a biography of Leopold, who described his book as "a very shoddy piece of work" and declared that "Leopold did not start a genocide. He was greedy for money and chose not to interest himself when things got out of control." Hochschild does not use the word genocide, but describes how the mass deaths happened as a result of the forced labor system instituted at Leopold's direction.

King Leopold's Ghost was specifically singled out for praise by the American Historical Association when it gave Hochschild its Theodore Roosevelt-Woodrow Wilson Award in 2008. In a 2023 article published by The American Conservative, political scientist Bruce Gilley, noted for authoring "The Case for Colonialism", was highly critical of the accuracy of the book. In a subsequent article, Hochschild and Gilley had an exchange regarding the criticism.

== See also ==
- Belgian Empire
- King Leopold's Soliloquy
- Congo Reform Association
- Congo Free State propaganda war
- Congo: The Epic History of a People
- Heart of Darkness
