= Adam Hochschild =

American author, journalist, and lecturer (born 1942)

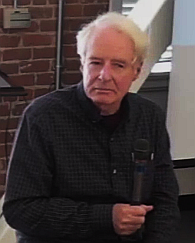
- Born: October 5, 1942 (age 84); New York City, U.S.
- Education: Harvard University (BA)
- Occupations: Writer, journalist
- Spouse: Arlie Russell Hochschild
- Children: 2
- Parent(s): Harold K. Hochschild; Mary Marquand Hochschild
- Family: Berthold Hochschild (grandfather); Allan Marquand (grandfather); Henry Gurdon Marquand (great-grandfather)

Adam Hochschild (/ˈhoʊkʃɪld/ HOHK-shild; born October 5, 1942) is an American author, journalist, historian and lecturer. His best-known works include King Leopold's Ghost (1998), To End All Wars: A Story of Loyalty and Rebellion, 1914–1918 (2011), Bury the Chains (2005), The Mirror at Midnight (1990), The Unquiet Ghost (1994), and Spain in Our Hearts (2016).

== Biography ==
Adam Hochschild was born in New York City. His father, Harold Hochschild, was of German Jewish descent; his mother, Mary Marquand Hochschild, was of English and Scottish descent and the daughter of art historian Allan Marquand, and an uncle by marriage, Boris Sergievsky, was a World War I fighter pilot in the Imperial Russian Air Force. His German-born paternal grandfather Berthold Hochschild co-founded the mining firm American Metal Company.

Hochschild graduated from Harvard in 1963 with a BA in History and Literature. As a college student, he spent a summer working on an anti-government newspaper in South Africa and subsequently worked briefly as a civil rights worker in Mississippi during 1964. Both were politically pivotal experiences about which he would eventually write in his books Half the Way Home: A Memoir of Father and Son and Finding the Trapdoor: Essays, Portraits, Travels. He later was part of the movement against the Vietnam War, and, after several years as a daily newspaper reporter, worked as a writer and editor for the left-wing Ramparts magazine. In 1976, he was a co-founder of Mother Jones. Much of his writing has been about issues of human rights and social justice.

A longtime lecturer at the Graduate School of Journalism at the University of California, Berkeley, Hochschild has also been a Fulbright Lecturer in India, Regents' Lecturer at the University of California, Santa Cruz and Writer-in-Residence at the Department of History, University of Massachusetts, Amherst. He is married to sociologist Arlie Russell Hochschild and lives in Berkeley, California.

As of 1993, he was a member of the Democratic Socialists of America.

== Works ==
=== Books ===
Hochschild's first book was a memoir, Half the Way Home: A Memoir of Father and Son (1986), in which he described the difficult relationship he had with his father. In The New York Times, critic Michiko Kakutani called the book "an extraordinarily moving portrait of the complexities and confusions of familial love."

In The Mirror at Midnight: A South African Journey (1990; new edition, 2007) he examines the tensions of modern South Africa through the prism of the nineteenth-century Battle of Blood River, which determined whether the Boers or the Zulus would control that part of the world, as well as looking at the contentious commemoration of the event by rival groups 150 years later, at the height of the apartheid era.

In The Unquiet Ghost: Russians Remember Stalin (1994; new edition, 2003), Hochschild chronicles the six months he spent in Russia, traveling to Siberia and the Arctic, interviewing gulag survivors, retired concentration camp guards, former members of the secret police and countless others about Joseph Stalin's reign of terror in the country, during which hundreds of thousands of people died.

Hochschild's Finding the Trapdoor: Essays, Portraits, Travels (1997) collects his personal essays and shorter pieces of reportage, as does a more recent collection, Lessons from a Dark Time and Other Essays (2018)

His King Leopold's Ghost: A Story of Greed, Terror, and Heroism in Colonial Africa (1998; new edition, 2006) is a history of the conquest of the Congo by King Léopold II of Belgium, and of the atrocities that were committed under Leopold's private rule of the colony, events that led to the twentieth century's first great international human rights campaign. The book reignited interest and inquiry into Leopold's colonial regime in the Congo, but was met by some hostility in Belgium. According to The Guardian' review at the time of the book's first edition, the book "brought howls of rage from Belgium's ageing colonials and some professional historians even as it has climbed the country's best-seller lists."

Hochschild's Bury the Chains: Prophets and Rebels in the Fight to Free an Empire's Slaves (2005) is about the antislavery movement in Britain. The story of how abolitionists organized to change the opinions of and bring greater awareness to the British public about slavery has attracted attention from contemporary climate change activists, who see an analogy to their own work.

In 2011, Hochschild published To End All Wars: A Story of Loyalty and Rebellion, 1914–1918, which considers the First World War in terms of the struggle between those who felt the war was a noble crusade and those who felt it was not worth the sacrifice of millions of lives. His 2016 Spain in Our Hearts: Americans in the Spanish Civil War, 1936–1939 follows a dozen characters through that conflict, among them volunteer soldiers and medical workers, journalists who covered the war, and a little-known American oilman who sold Francisco Franco most of the fuel for his military. Rebel Cinderella: From Rags to Riches to Radical, the Epic Journey of Rose Pastor Stokes, was published in 2020, and his latest, American Midnight: The Great War, a Violent Peace, and Democracy's Forgotten Crisis, in 2022. Hochschild's books have been translated into seventeen languages.

=== Journalism ===
Hochschild has also written for the New Yorker, Harper's Magazine, The Atlantic, Granta, the Times Literary Supplement, the New York Review of Books, the New York Times Magazine, and The Nation and other publications. He was also a commentator on National Public Radio's All Things Considered.

== Bibliography ==
=== Books ===
- The Mirror at Midnight: A South African Journey (1990/2007). ISBN 978-0-618-75825-8
- The Unquiet Ghost: Russians Remember Stalin (1994/2003). ISBN 978-0-618-25747-8
- Finding the Trapdoor: Essays, Portraits, Travels (1997). ISBN 0-8156-0594-3
- King Leopold's Ghost: A Story of Greed, Terror and Heroism in Colonial Africa (1998/2006). ISBN 978-0-618-00190-3
- Bury the Chains: Prophets and Rebels in the Fight to Free an Empire's Slaves (2005). ISBN 978-0-618-61907-8
- Half the Way Home : A Memoir of Father and Son (Paperback ed.). Boston: Houghton Mifflin. 2005 [1986].
- To End All Wars: A Story of Loyalty and Rebellion, 1914–1918 (2011). ISBN 978-0-547-75031-6
- Spain in Our Hearts: Americans in the Spanish Civil War, 1936-1939 (2016). ISBN 978-0-547-97318-0
- Lessons from a Dark Time and Other Essays (2018). ISBN 978-0-520-29724-1
- Rebel Cinderella: From Rags to Riches to Radical, the Epic Journey of Rose Pastor Stokes (2020). ISBN 978-1-328-86674-5
- American Midnight: The Great War, a Violent Peace, and Democracy's Forgotten Crisis (2022), covers the period between World War I and the Roaring Twenties.

== Awards ==
- 1998 California Book Awards, Gold Medal, King Leopold's Ghost
- 1998 National Book Critics Circle Award, finalist, King Leopold's Ghost
- 1998 PEN/Diamonstein-Spielvogel Award for the Art of the Essay, Finding the Trapdoor
- 1999 Duff Cooper Prize, King Leopold's Ghost
- 1999 Mark Lynton History Prize, King Leopold's Ghost
- 1999 Lionel Gelber Prize
- 2005 National Book Award, finalist, Bury the Chains
- 2005 California Book Awards, Gold Medal, Bury the Chains
- 2005 Lannan Literary Award for Non-Fiction for the full body of his work.
- 2005 Los Angeles Times Book Prize for History, Bury the Chains
- 2006 PEN USA Literary Award for Research Nonfiction, Bury the Chains
- 2006 Lionel Gelber Prize (first person to have won twice)
- 2009 Theodore Roosevelt-Woodrow Wilson Prize from the American Historical Association
- 2012 National Book Critics Circle Award, finalist, To End All Wars
- 2012 Dayton Literary Peace Prize, winner, To End All Wars
- 2014 elected a fellow of the American Academy of Arts and Sciences
- 2017 Mark Lynton History Prize, finalist, Spain in Our Hearts
- 2023 California Book Awards, Gold Medal, American Midnight
- 2023 Dayton Literary Peace Prize, runner-up, American Midnight
- Honorary degrees from Curry College in Massachusetts and the University of St Andrews in Scotland.
