= Jean Stengers =

Belgian historian

Jean Stengers (French: [stɛnɡɛʁs]. 13 June 1922 – 15 August 2002, Ixelles) was a Belgian historian.

== Biography ==
A precocious and bright student, Stengers entered the Free University of Brussels in 1939, at the age of 17. He published his first scholarly article two years later in the Revue belge de philologie et d'histoire (Belgian review of philology and history). In 1948, he presented his doctoral thesis under the direction of Professor Bonenfant on the historical bases of the national sentiments of Belgium.

"From this time," said the historian Ginette Kurgan, "the astonishing eclecticism of his interests is manifest, reinforced by a rigour of approach stimulated by his training as a medievalist." From 1949 he taught colonial history as assistant to professor Franz Van Kalken, and in 1951 he took over Van Kalken's entire curriculum in modern history.

Stengers was promoted to professeur ordinaire in 1954. He helped found the Institute of the History of Christianity, and in 1967 succeeded Guillaume Jacquemyns as director of the seminar of contemporary history. Though his interests were wide-ranging, his scholarly reputation was built on his treatment of Belgian colonial history. His work Congo, Mythes et réalités was published in 1989. Stengers' doctoral students included Jacques Brassinne de La Buissière and Louis-François Vanderstraeten.

He was the father of the historian of science and epistemologist Isabelle Stengers and of Belgian politician Marie-Laure Stengers.

== Selected works ==
- "Vertige de l'historien. Les histoires au risque du hasard, Bruxelles, 1998.
- "Essai d'une méthode d'évaluation des sommes d'argent exprimées en monnaies anciennes", Revue belge de philologie et d'histoire, Vol. 20 (3–4), 1941, pp. 575–588.
- Belgique et Congo; l'élaboration de la Charte coloniale, Bruxelles, La Renaissance du Livre, 1963.
- With Anne Van Neck: "Histoire d'une grande peur, la masturbation", Paris. Published by Palgrave as "Masturbation. The History of a Great Terror", (translated by Kathryn Hoffmann), 2001, New York.
- La fondation de l'état indépendant du Congo, L' histoire aujourd'hui : nouveaux objets, nouvelles méthodes, Liège, Université de Liège. Faculté de philosophie et lettres. Faculté ouverte, vol. B 26, 1985.
- Congo, Mythes et réalités, Paris-Louvain-la-Neuve, Duculot, 1989. (Revised and expanded in 2005, éditions Racine.)
- L'action du Roi en Belgique depuis 1831. Pouvoir et influence, Bruxelles, Éditions Duculot, 1994 (réimpr. 2008, Éditions Racine), 432 p. (ISBN 978-2873865672)
- With Éliane Gubin: Histoire du sentiment national en Belgique des origines à 1918, Bruxelles, Racine, 2000–2002, 2 vol. (Vol. 1: Les racines de la Belgique : jusqu'à la révolution de 1830; Vol. 2: Le grand siècle de la nationalité belge).
- Une guerre pour l'honneur. La Belgique en 14-18, Bruxelles, Racine, 2014.

== Sources ==
- Ginette Kurgan-van Hentenryk, Jean Stengers, l'homme et son œuvre, Revue belge de philologie et d'histoire, 82-1-2, 2004, p. 15–26
- J.-M. Duvosquel, A. Dierkens, G. Vanthemsche, Bibliographie thématique de Jean Stengers, Revue belge de philologie et d'histoire, 82-1-2, 2004, p. 27–48
