= Beyond the Light Barrier =

2023 documentary film directed by Uga Carlini

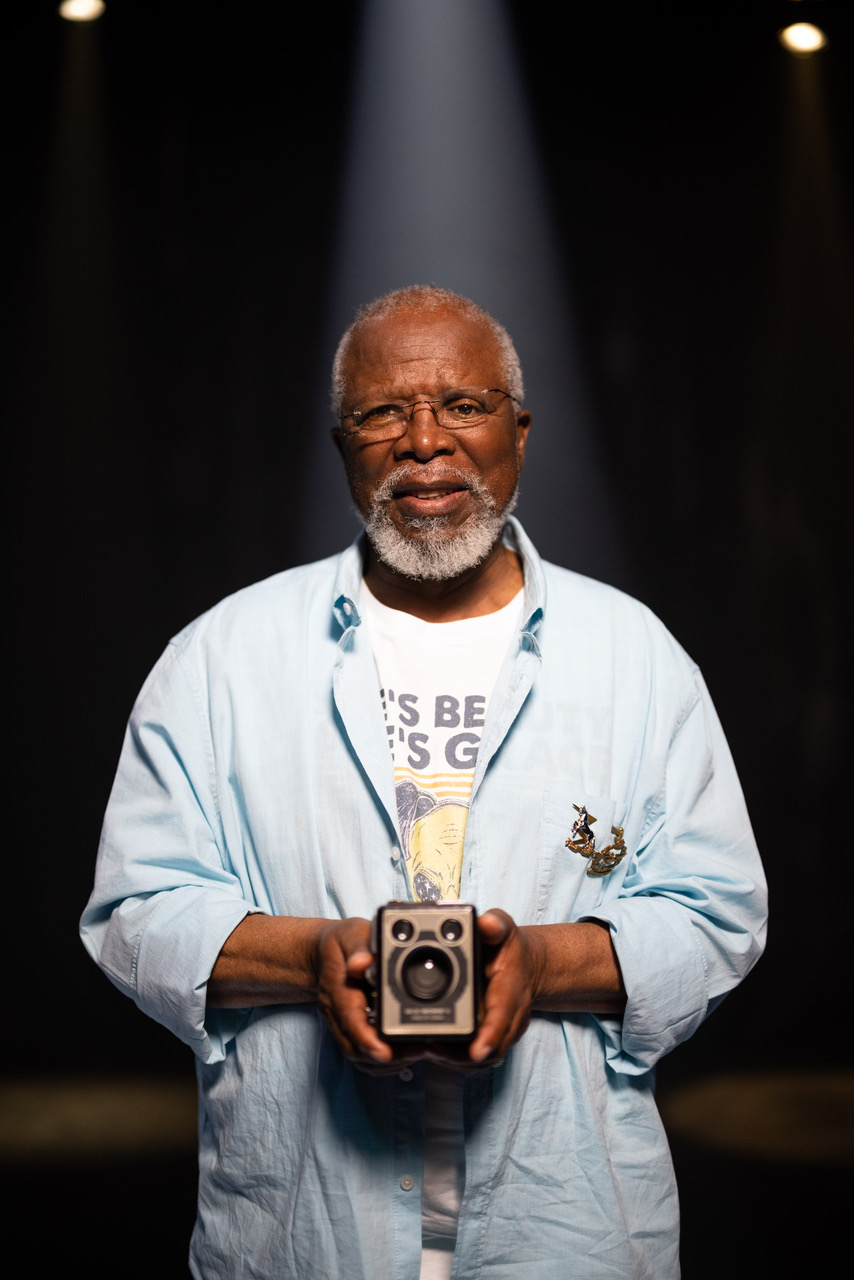
- Directed by: Uga Carlini
- Written by: Uga Carlini
- Produced by: Uga Carlini
- Starring: Sue Armstrong; Denis Delestrac; J.J. Hurtak; Beth Brady; John Kani
- Cinematography: Georgia Court
- Edited by: Joe De Ornelas
- Music by: Charl-Johan Lingenfelder
- Production company: Towerkop Creations
- Release date: 6 October 2023
- Running time: 87 minutes
- Country: South African
- Language: English

Beyond the Light Barrier is a 2023 South African documentary film directed, written, and produced by Uga Carlini. Narrated by John Kani, the film examines the life and claims of Elizabeth Klarer, a South African meteorologist who alleged she had a romantic relationship with an extraterrestrial being named Akon from the planet Meton in the Proxima Centauri system. It premiered at the Encounters South African International Documentary Film Festival in June 2023 and was released worldwide on Amazon Prime on 6 October 2023.

== Synopsis ==
The film focuses on Elizabeth Klarer (1910–1994), a South African meteorologist who claimed she was abducted by an alien named Akon in the 1950s. She said she lived on Meton for four months, fell in love with Akon, and had a son with him, later sharing details of alien technology upon returning to Earth. The film uses interviews, archival footage, and animations to explore her story and its cultural context, narrated by John Kani, without confirming or denying its validity.

== Cast ==
- Sue Armstrong as Herself
- Beth Brady as Young Elizabeth
- John Kani as Narrator
- Paul Brogan as Himself
- Chester Chandler as Himself
- Denis Delestrac as Herself
- Elizabeth Klarer as Herself (archival footage)

== Production ==
The film was written, directed, and produced by Uga Carlini under Towerkop Creations. The film took 13 years to complete, evolving from Carlini's earlier short film, Good Planets Are Hard to Find, which also focused on Elizabeth Klarer. It incorporates comic-book-style animations directed by Inka Kendzia and illustrations by Carmen Ziervogel. The project was partially funded through Ethereum cryptocurrency and received support from the National Film and Video Foundation (NFVF) of South Africa.

== Release ==
The film premiered at the Encounters South African International Documentary Film Festival in June 2023 and screened at festivals such as the Hilton Arts Festival and the Female Eye Film Festival in Toronto. It was released globally on Amazon Prime on 6 October 2023.

== Awards and nominations ==
Year	Award	Category	Recipient(s)	Result	Ref.
2023	Female Eye Film Festival	Best Foreign Documentary	Uga Carlini	Won	
2023	Encounters South African International Documentary Festival	Best Documentary Film by an African Woman	Uga Carlini	Nominated	
2023	Encounters South African International Documentary Festival	Best South-African Film	Uga Carlini	Nominated	
2024	South African Film and Television Awards	Best Documentary Feature	Uga Carlini	Nominated	
