= Uga Carlini =

South African film director, writer and producer

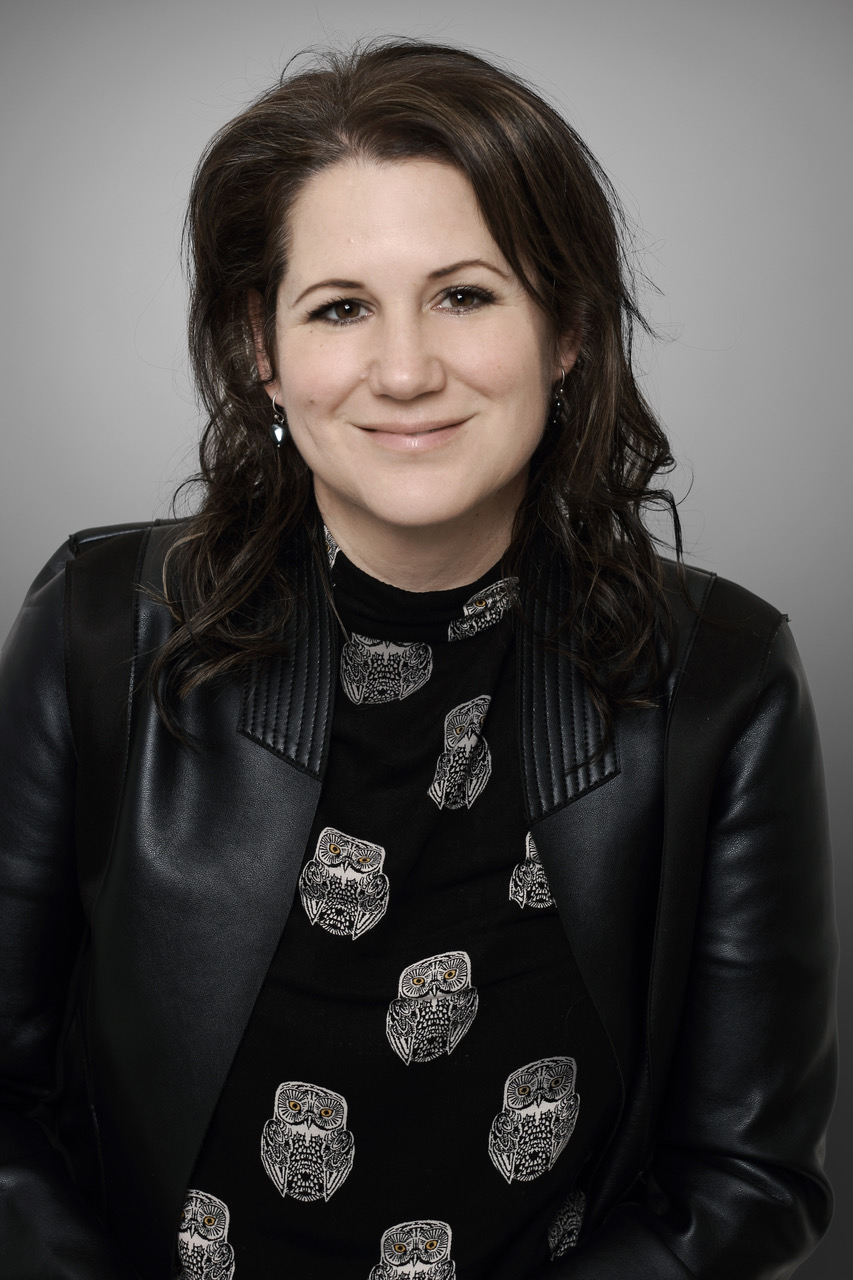
- Born: Pretoria, Gauteng, South Africa
- Education: Stellenbosch University
- Occupations: Director; writer; producer; actor
- Years active: 2010 – present
- Notable work: The Butterfly Revolution; Alison
- Children: 2

Uga Carlini is a South African and Italian film director, writer, actor and producer, based in Canada. She is known for the documentaries Alison and Beyond the Light Barrier and the feature film Angeliena.

== Life and career ==
Carlini was born in Pretoria, Gauteng and graduated from Stellenbosch University. In 2010, She founded Towerkop Creations, a production company centered on stories featuring female protagonists. Since 2025, Towerkop Creations has operated a branch in Vancouver, Canada, expanding its presence beyond South Africa. Her debut documentary short film, Good Planets Are Hard to Find, was about Elizabeth Klarer. In 2016, she directed the feature documentary, Alison, based on the Marianne Thamm book, I Have Life. It premiered at the Dances with Films Festival. She has also directed the music videos 17 shots, Die Deur, Wildste Oomblik and Beauty of Africa for the Sony Music Africa.

Carlini's debut feature film, Angeliena, about a formerly homeless parking attendant, was released worldwide Netflix on October 8, 2021. She directed Beyond the Light Barrier (2023), a hybrid documentary about Elizabeth Klarer, a South African meteorologist. In 2006, she wrote a syllabus in acting, filmmaking, and screenwriting for the Fiji National University (FNU). In 2024, she returned to FNU to host a film masterclass. She is a member of the Producers Guild of America, and the Directors Guild of Canada.

== Personal life ==
Carlini has two sons, Roka and Neo, both made their acting debuts together in the feature film, Angeliena.

== Filmography ==
Year	Title	Director	Writer	Producer	Note
2010	Sewe Sakke Sout		Yes		TV series
2011	Good Planets Are Hard to Find	Yes	Yes	Yes	Documentary
2016	Alison	Yes	Yes	Yes	Documentary
2016	The Butterfly Revolution	Yes	Yes	Yes	Commercial video
2017	Die Bergs	Yes	Yes	Yes	TV series
2019	17 Shots	Yes	Yes	Yes	Music video
2019	Die Deur	Yes	Yes	Yes	Short film
2019	Far from home	Yes	Yes		Documentary
2019	Day Zero	Yes	Yes		Documentary
2020	Home #homehuman2020	Yes		Yes	Short film
2020	Wildste Oomblik	Yes		Yes	Music video
2021	Beauty of Africa	Yes		Yes	Short film
2021	Angeliena	Yes	Yes	Yes	Feature film
2023	Beyond the Light Barrier	Yes	Yes	Yes	Documentary

== Awards and nominations ==
Year	Result	Award	Category	Work	Ref.
2016	Won	Asia-Pacific Film Festival	Best Documentary Film	Alison	
2016	Nominated	Silwerskerm Film Festival	Best documentary Feature	Alison	
	Won	Writers Guild of South Africa	Best documentary script	Alison	
2017	Won	Africa Magic Viewers' Choice Awards	Best Documentary Feature	Alison	
2017	Nominated	South African Film and Television Awards	Best Documentary Feature	Alison	
2017	Nominated	South African Film and Television Awards	Best Achievement in Directing	Alison	
2019	Nominated	New Media Film Festival	Festival Award	17 Shots	
2022	Nominated	Africa Movie Academy Awards	Best director	Angeliena	
2022	Nominated	Africa Movie Academy Awards	First feature by a director	Angeliena	
2022	Nominated	Africa Movie Academy Awards	Best film	Angeliena	
2022	Won	SAFTA Awards	Best supporting actor in a feature film: Tshamano Sebe	Angeliena	
2022	Nominated	SAFTA Awards	Best achievement in original music/score - feature film: Charl-Johan Lingenfelder	Angeliena	
2023	Won	Writers Guild of South Africa	Best produced documentary feature film screenplay	Beyond the light barrier	
2023	Won	Female Eye Film Festival	Best Foreign Documentary	Beyond the light barrier	
2023	Nominated	Encounters Festival South Africa	Best Documentary Film by an African Woman	Beyond the light barrier	
2023	Nominated	Encounters Festival South Africa	Best South-African Film	Beyond the light barrier	
2024	Nominated	South African Film and Television Awards	Best Documentary Feature	Beyond the light barrier	
