= List of television awards =

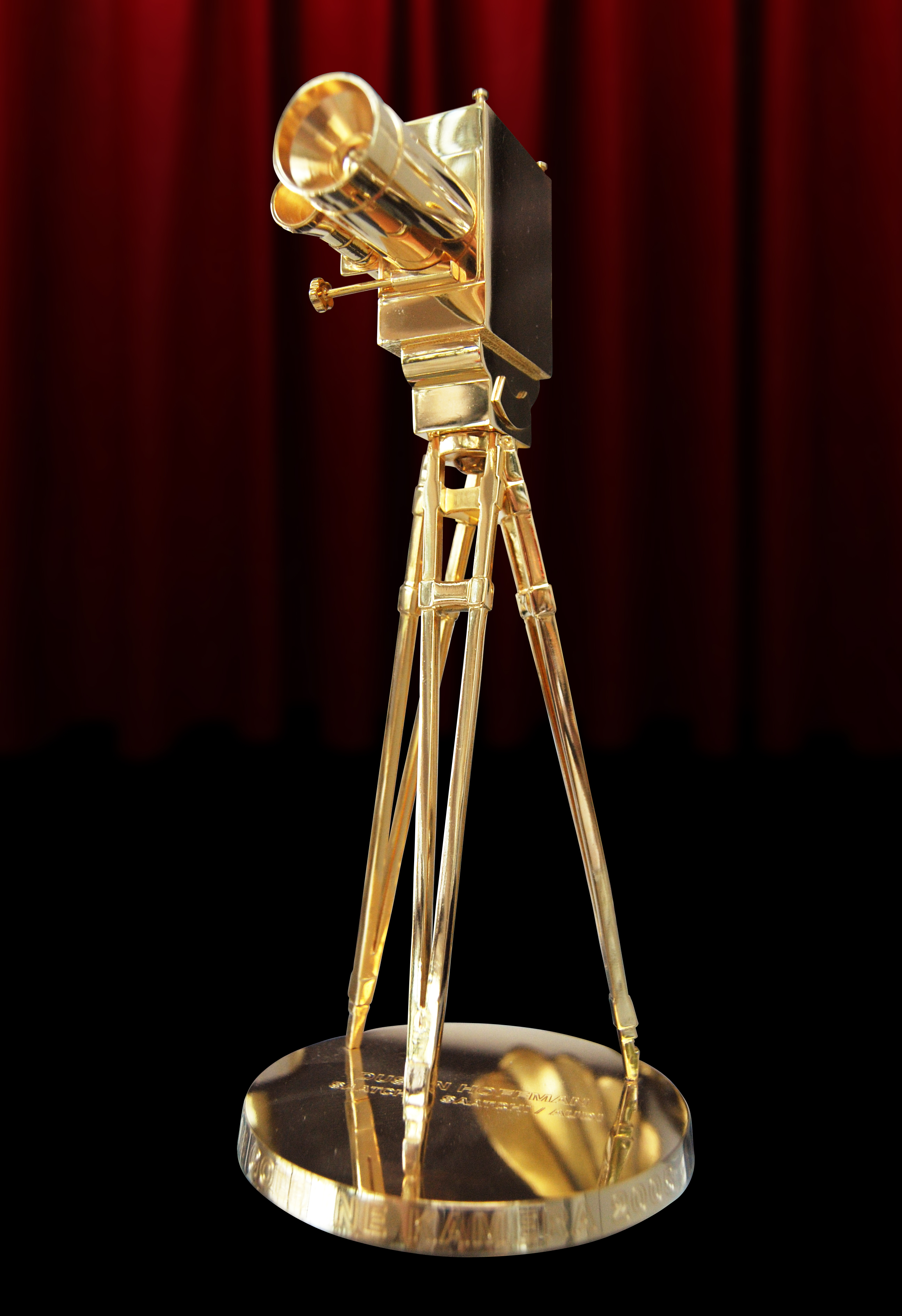
The Goldene Kamera

This list of television awards is an index to articles on notable awards that are given to television shows in different countries and categories. The list is organized by region and country. Typically the awards are given only for local productions. Screenwriting awards for television are included in the separate list of writing awards.

== Africa ==
- South African Film and Television Awards

== Oceania ==
Country	Award	Sponsor	Notes
Australia	AACTA Awards	Australian Academy of Cinema and Television Arts	Recognise and honour outstanding achievement in the Australian film and television industry
Australia	Antenna Awards	C31 Melbourne	Outstanding achievements in community television production
Australia	ASTRA Awards	Australian Subscription Television and Radio Association	Talent that drives the Australian subscription television industry and creativity, commitment and investment in production and broadcasting.".
Australia	ATOM Award	Australian Teachers of Media	Achievements in the making of film, television, multimedia, and from 2007 multi-modal productions
Australia	Australian Film Institute Television Awards	Australian Film Institute	Excellence in Australian television annually
Australia	Casting Guild of Australia Awards	Casting Guild of Australia	Casting: various categories
Australia	Deadly Awards	Vibe Australia	Celebration of Australian Aboriginal and Torres Strait Islander achievement in music, sport, entertainment and community.
Australia	Equity Ensemble Awards	The Equity Foundation (Media, Entertainment and Arts Alliance)	Cast in a television drama series, comedy series and television movie or miniseries
Australia	Logie Awards	TV Week	Excellence in Australian television
Australia	Logie Hall of Fame	TV Week	Outstanding contribution and achievements of individuals to the Australian television industry such as actors, producers, directors and writers, as well as iconic television programs
Australia	National Dreamtime Awards	No Limit Events	First Nation people from across Australia to recognise excellence in the categories of Sport, Arts, Education, Health and Community
Australia	Penguin Award	Television Society of Australia	Excellence in broadcasting
Australia	People's Choice Awards	People's Choice Awards	Various categories
New Zealand	Documentary Edge Awards	Documentary New Zealand Trust	Documentary films: various categories
New Zealand	New Zealand film and television awards	Rialto Channel New Zealand Film Awards	Special skills and unique talents of the companies and individuals who create, produce, and perform in television programmes in New Zealand

== See also ==
- List of film awards
- Lists of awards
- List of awards for supporting actor
- List of writing awards#Screenwriting awards for television
