= Documentary Edge Awards =

Documentary Edge Festival
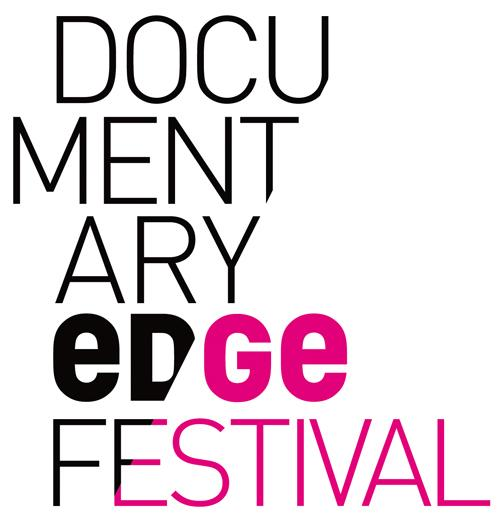
- Location: Auckland and Wellington, New Zealand
- Founded: 2005
- Festival date: 11 days
- Language: International
- Website: docedge.nz

This article lists awards won at the New Zealand film festival formerly known as the DOCNZ Film Festival, then Documentary Edge Festival and now branded Doc Edge, since its inaugural edition in 2005 until 2012.

== Awards 2012 ==
=== International Selection ===
Film	Award	Directors	Country
Vinterlys	Best International Short Documentary	Skule Eriksen	Norway
The Interrupters	Best International Feature Documentary, Best International Director, Best World Cinema	Steve James	United States
Five Star Existence	Best Future Watch	Sonja Lindén	Sweden Finland
Malaki — Scent of an Angel	Best Arab Spring	Kahlil Dreifus Zaarour	Lebanon
Who killed Chea Vichea?	Best Human Rights	Bradley Cox	Thailand United States
Life in Stills	Best Generations	Tamar Tal	Israel
Incessant Visions	Best Heroes and Incons	Duki Dror	Israel
Andrew Bird: Fever Year	Best Culture Vultures	Xan Aranda	United States

=== New Zealand Selection ===
Film	Award	Directors	Country
Intersexion	Best Feature Documentary Best Editing	Grant Lahood	New Zealand
Gone Curling	Best Short Documentary	Roland Kahurangi Rachael Patching	New Zealand
River Dog	Best Emerging Filmmaker	James Muir	New Zealand
View From Olympus	Best Director	Geoffrey Cawthorn	New Zealand
Yakel 3D	Best Cinematography	Rachael Wilson	New Zealand

== Awards 2011 ==
=== International Selection ===
Film	Award	Directors	Country
The Mystery of Flying Kicks	Best International Short Documentary	Matthew Bate	Australia
Into Eternity	Best International Editing	Michael Madsen	Denmark Finland
Steam of Life	Best International Cinematography	Joonas Berghäll Mika Hotakainen	Finland
Leave Them Laughing	Best On the Edge	John Zaritsky	Canada United States
Enemies of the People	Best International Director Best International Feature Documentary	Rob Lemkin Thet Sambath	Cambodia (United Kingdom) UK
Precious Life	Best International Director	Shlomi Eldar	Israel

=== New Zealand Selection ===
Film	Award	Directors	Country
Hiding Behind the Green Screen	Best Emerging Filmmaker, Best Short Documentary	Paora Joseph	New Zealand
Donated to Science	Best Director	Paul Trotman	New Zealand
I Am the River	Best Feature Documentary, Best Cinematography, Best Editing	Luigi Cutore Mark McNeill	New Zealand
This Way of Life	Best Contribution to the NZ Industry	Thomas Burstyn	New Zealand
The Topp Twins: Untouchable Girls	Best Contribution to the NZ Industry	Leanne Pooley	New Zealand

== Awards 2010 ==
=== International Selection ===
Film	Award	Directors	Country
The Solitary Life of Cranes	Best International Short Documentary	Eva Weber	(United Kingdom) UK
Last Train Home	Best International Feature Documentary	Lixin Fan	Canada
Stolen	Best International Editing	Violeta Ayala Daniel Fallshaw	Australia
At the Edge of the World	Best International Cinematography	Dan Stone	United States
Defamation	Best International Director	Yoav Shamir	Israel Denmark United States Austria
Petition	Best International Director	Zhao Liang	China Switzerland (United Kingdom) UK France Finland Belgium

=== New Zealand Selection ===
Film	Award	Directors	Country
Dance of the Instance	Best Short Documentary, Best Educational Documentary, Best Research	Shirley Horrocks	New Zealand
Five Hours with Raja	Best Emerging Filmmaker	Anna McKessar	New Zealand
The Unnatural History of the Kakapo	Best Director, Best Cinematography, Best Sound, Best Feature Documentary	Scott Mouat	New Zealand
Liquid Stone: Unlocking Gaudi's Secrets	Best Editing	Polly Watkins	New Zealand Australia

== Awards 2009 ==
=== International Selection ===
Film	Award	Directors	Country
Don Roberto's Shadow	Best International Short Documentary	Juan Diego Spoerer Hakan Engstrom	Chile Sweden
At the Death House Door	Best International Feature Documentary	Steve James Peter Gilbert	United States
Sea Point Days	Best International Editing	François Verster	South Africa
The Wild Horse Redemption	Best International Cinematography	John Zaritsky	Canada
Oblivion	Best International Director	Heddy Honigmann	Germany Netherlands

=== New Zealand Selection ===
Film	Award	Directors	Country
An Ordinary Person	Best Short Documentary	Susan Potter	New Zealand
Shustak	Best Emerging Filmmaker Best New Zealand Feature Documentary	Stuart Page	New Zealand
The Last Western Heretic	Best Educational Documentary	Monique Oomen	New Zealand

== Awards 2008 ==
No Festival this year.

== Awards 2007 ==
=== International Selection ===
Film	Award	Directors	Country
A Summer Not to Forget	Best International Short Documentary	Carol Mansour	Lebanon
Please Vote For Me	Best International Medium Documentary Best International Educational Documentary	Weijun Chen	South Africa
Knee Deep	Best International Feature Documentary	Michael Chandler	United States

=== New Zealand Selection ===
Film	Award	Directors	Country
In the Night Kitchen	Best Short Documentary	Simon Burgin	New Zealand
Darling! The Pieter-Dirk Uys Story	Best Emerging Filmmaker Best Medium Documentary	Julian Shaw	Australia New Zealand South Africa
The Nuclear Comeback	Best Feature Documentary	Justin Pemberton	New Zealand

== Awards 2006 ==
=== International Selection ===
Film	Award	Directors	Country
Prostitution Behind the Veil	Best International Medium Documentary	Nahid Persson Sarvestani	Iran Sweden
Me and My Parents, My Parents and I	Best International Feature Documentary	Gerrit van Elst	Netherlands
Martyr Street	Best International Feature Documentary	Shelley Saywell	Canada
The Black Road	Screenrights Best Made for TV Doco	William Nessen	Australia

=== New Zealand Selection ===
Film	Award	Directors	Country
Black and White	Best NZ ShortDocumentary	Kirsty McDonald	New Zealand
4 Geese in a Flock	Best NZ Medium Documentary	Luke Wheeler	New Zealand
Ghost Fleet	Best NZ Feature Documentary	Jonathan Finnegan	New Zealand

== Awards 2005 ==
Film	Award	Directors	Country
Aeon	Best NZ Short Documentary	Richard Sidey	New Zealand
Banana in a Nutshell	Best NZ Medium Documentary	Roseane Liang	New Zealand China
Dark Horse	Best NZ FeatureDocumentary	Jim Marbrook	New Zealand

== See also ==
- List of television awards
