= Angeliena =

2021 film by Uga Carlini

- Directed by: Uga Carlini
- Written by: Uga Carlini
- Produced by: Dumi Gumbi; Uga Carlini
- Starring: Euodia Samson; Tshamano Sebe; Thapelo Mokoena; June van Merch; Kuli Roberts; Colin Moss
- Cinematography: Trevor Michael Brown
- Edited by: Rudolf Buitendach
- Music by: Charl-Johan Lingenfelder
- Production company: Towerkop Creations
- Distributed by: Netflix
- Release date: October 8, 2021 (United States)
- Running time: 95 minutes
- Country: South Africa
- Language: English

Angeliena is a 2021 South African comedy-drama film directed and written by Uga Carlini. The film stars Euodia Samson, Tshamano Sebe, Thapelo Mokoena, Colin Moss and Kuli Roberts.

Angeliena was released worldwide on Netflix on October 8, 2021.

== Premise ==
In modern day South Africa, colourful Angeliena (Euodia Samson) is a former homeless car guard who is trapped by an unrealistic dream of traveling the world. But when she is diagnosed with a fatal disease, and with a little help from her friends, she dares to put her dream of world travel into motion.

== Cast ==
- Euodia Samson as Angeliena
- Tshamano Sebe as Mr. Majaba
- Thapelo Mokoena as Dr. Alasa
- June van Merch as Auntie Dot
- Marciel Hopkins as Nurse Debbie
- Kuli Roberts as Tina
- Colin Moss as Lawrence Mitchell
- Nicole Amy Madell as Lily Mitchell
- Roka Carlini-Vidulin as Adrianus
- Neo Carlini-Vidulin as Stefanus

== Awards and nominations ==
Year	Result	Award	Category	Work	Ref.
2020	Nominated	Writer's Guild of South Africa Muse Awards	Best Fiction Feature Screenplay	Angeliena	
2022	Nominated	Africa Movie Academy Awards	Best film	Angeliena	
2022	Nominated	Africa Movie Academy Awards	Best director	Angeliena	
2022	Nominated	Africa Movie Academy Awards	Best first-time fiction director	Angeliena	
2022	Won	Africa Movie Academy Awards	Best achievement in make-up	Angeliena	
2022	Nominated	Africa Movie Academy Awards	Best actress in a leading role: Euodia Samson	Angeliena	
2022	Nominated	Africa Movie Academy Awards	Best supporting actor: Tshamano Sebe	Angeliena	
2022	Nominated	Africa Movie Academy Awards	Achievement in editing	Angeliena	
2022	Won	SAFTA awards	Best supporting actor in a feature film: Tshamano Sebe	Angeliena	
2022	Nominated	SAFTA awards	Best achievement in original music/score - feature film: Charl-Johan Lingenfelder	Angeliena	
