= Alison (film) =

2016 documentary film by Uga Carlini

Alison Botha
- Directed by: Uga Carlini
- Screenplay by: Uga Carlini
- Produced by: Uga Carlini
- Starring: Alison Botha; Christia Visser
- Cinematography: Georgia Court
- Edited by: Daniel Mitchell
- Music by: Alice Gillham
- Production company: Towerkop Creations
- Release date: May 16, 2016
- Running time: 80 minutes
- Country: South Africa

Alison is a 2016 South African documentary film directed, written and produced by Uga Carlini. The film is based on the real life abduction, gang rape, stabbings, abandonment, and then survival of Alison Botha in 1994. Botha appears as her older self. The film premiered at the Dances with Films Festival in 2016.

== Premise ==
The documentary is based on the Marianne Thamm book, I Have Life, published by Penguin Random House. Alison combines re-enactments with interviews to tell the story of a South African woman who endured a horrific incident in which she is raped, stabbed and disemboweled. The film’s hybrid style has a fairytale quality, turning participants into archetypes. Built around intimate interview sessions, is a story of “monsters, miracles and hope”. The film goes beyond the horrific events to explore the woman herself and how she helped others through her life.

== Cast ==
- Alison Botha as herself
- Christia Visser as Young Alison

=== Accolades ===
Year	Award	Category	Recipient(s)	Result	Ref.
2016	Asia-Pacific Film Festival	Best Documentary Film	Uga Carlini	Won	
2016	Silwerskerm Film Festival	Best documentary Feature	Uga Carlini	Nominated	
2017	Africa Magic Viewers' Choice Awards	Best Documentary Feature	Uga Carlini	Won	
2017	South African Film and Television Awards	Best Documentary Feature	Uga Carlini	Nominated	
2017	South African Film and Television Awards	Best Achievement in Directing	Uga Carlini	Nominated	
2017	South African Film and Television Awards	Best Achievement in Cinematography	Georgia Court	Nominated	
2017	South African Film and Television Awards	Best Achievement in Editing	Daniel Mitchell	Nominated	

== Sources ==
Marianne Thamm: I Have Life: Alison's journey ISBN 9781776093168
