= Mpofana Local Municipality =

Coordinates: 29°09′33″S 29°57′45″E

Mpofana (services)
- Local municipality
- Seal
- Interactive map of Mpofana (services)
- Country: South Africa
- Province: KwaZulu-Natal
- District: uMgungundlovu
- Seat: Mooi River
- Wards: 6

Government
  - Type: Municipal council

Area
  - Total: 1,820 km^{2} (700 sq mi)

Population (2011)
  - Total: 38,103
  - Density: 20.9/km^{2} (54.2/sq mi)

Racial makeup (2011)
  - Black African: 92.1%
  - Coloured: 0.6%
  - Indian/Asian: 1.8%
  - White: 5.2%

First languages (2011)
  - Zulu: 87.0%
  - English: 7.0%
  - Southern Ndebele: 1.2%
  - Other: 4.8%
- Time zone: UTC+2 (SAST)
- Municipal code: KZN223

Mpofana Municipality (Zulu: UMasipala wase Mpofana) is a local municipality within the Umgungundlovu District Municipality, in the KwaZulu-Natal province of South Africa.

== Main places ==
The 2001 census divided the municipality into the following main places:

Place	Code	Area (km^{2})	Population
Mooi River	50902	13.42	13,408
Rosetta	50903	1.49	299
Remainder of the municipality	50901	1,642.85	23,104

== Politics ==
The municipal council consists of eleven members elected by mixed-member proportional representation. Six councillors are elected by first-past-the-post voting in six wards, while the remaining five are chosen from party lists so that the total number of party representatives is proportional to the number of votes received.

In the election of 4 November 2026, the African National Congress (ANC) lost its majority. The uMkhonto weSizwe Party won the largest number of seats on the council, with four.

The following table shows the results of the election.

Party	Ward			List			Total seats
Party	Votes	%	Seats	Votes	%	Seats	Total seats
uMkhonto weSizwe Party	3,418	32.28	3	3,571	33.65	1	4
African National Congress	3,180	30.04	0	3,119	29.39	3	3
Democratic Alliance	1,860	17.57	2	1,902	17.92	0	2
Inkatha Freedom Party	932	8.80	1	936	8.82	0	1
Independent Councillors	850	8.03	0	774	7.29	1	1
Independent candidates	6	0.06	0				0
4 other parties	341	3.22	0	309	2.91	0	0
Total	10,587	100.00	6	10,611	100.00	5	11
Valid votes	10,587	97.46		10,611	97.90		
Invalid/blank votes	276	2.54		228	2.10		
Total votes	10,863	100.00		10,839	100.00		
Registered voters/turnout	18,653	58.24		18,653	58.11		
