= Enemies of the People (film) =

2009 British-Cambodian documentary film

- Theatrical release poster
- Directed by: Thet Sambath; Rob Lemkin
- Written by: Thet Sambath; Rob Lemkin
- Produced by: Thet Sambath; Rob Lemkin
- Narrated by: Thet Sambath
- Cinematography: Thet Sambath; Rob Lemkin
- Edited by: Stefan Ronowicz
- Music by: Daniel Pemberton
- Production company: Old Street Films
- Distributed by: International Film Circuit
- Release date: 24 November 2009 (IDFA)
- Running time: 94 minutes
- Countries: Cambodia; United Kingdom
- Languages: English; Khmer

Enemies of the People is a 2009 British-Cambodian documentary film written and directed by Rob Lemkin and Thet Sambath. The film depicts the 10-year quest of co-director Sambath to find truth and closure in the Killing Fields of Cambodia. The film features interviews of former Khmer Rouge officials from the most senior surviving leader to the men and women who slit throats during the regime of Democratic Kampuchea between 1975 and 1979.

== Synopsis ==
An estimated 1.7 million Cambodians died during the rule of the Khmer Rouge, a radical communist movement that was led by Pol Pot. The victims included Thet Sambath's mother, father and brother. He says he did not understand why the Khmer Rouge unleashed such violence on their compatriots. In 1999, he decided to seek confessions and explanations from former Khmer Rouge officials who previously served the Khmer Rouge at all levels of the organization. None of them had previously admitted their role in any of the killings.

In 2001, he met Nuon Chea, Pol Pot's deputy, also known as Brother Number Two. Nuon Chea was then living as a private citizen in Prum, a small town on the Thai-Cambodian border. Sambath visited Nuon Chea during most weekends for around three years.

During that time, Nuon Chea was willing to talk about all of the phases of his political career except the three-and-a-half years of the Khmer Rouge's rule of Cambodia. He had previously been interviewed by Western and Japanese journalists but he had always denied his responsibility for the killing of people which the Khmer Rouge committed in the Cambodian genocide.

In 2004, Nuon Chea made his first admission to Sambath concerning decisions to kill that he made with Pol Pot. Sambath continued to interview Nuon Chea on his role in the Killing Fields for three more years. During that time the United Nations-backed Extraordinary Chambers in the Courts of Cambodia (ECCC) was constituted to investigate the alleged crimes of Democratic Kampuchea. Sambath interviewed Nuon Chea until September 2007 when the latter was arrested and charged with war crimes and crimes against humanity by the ECCC.

During the same period, Sambath also built up a network of less senior former Khmer Rouge officials and cadres who were prepared to acknowledge and detail their role in the Killing Fields. The film focuses on two Khmer Rouge perpetrators in the northwest of Cambodia. Khoun and Suon take Sambath to the scene of their massacres and introduce him to their superior officer, a woman who is known as Sister "Em". They give graphic accounts of the massacres they perpetrated. They also give voice to their own feelings of guilt, trauma and remorse. Towards the end of the film, Sambath brings Khoun and Suon to meet Nuon Chea and the three former Khmer Rouge comrades try to fathom the lethal history in which each of them played a part.

Throughout his three years of research, Sambath chose not to tell Nuon Chea about his family's fate in Democratic Kampuchea. At the end of the film and just before Nuon Chea's arrest, Sambath tells the whole story to the former Khmer Rouge leader.

The film also features appearances by Pol Pot, U.S. President Richard Nixon and Deng Yingchao, the widow of Chinese Premier Zhou Enlai.

== Production ==
Enemies of the People was written, directed and filmed by Rob Lemkin and Thet Sambath, who worked on the film together from September 2006 until November 2009.

The film was edited in London by Lemkin and film editor Stefan Ronowicz. The score was composed by Daniel Pemberton.

The film's world premiere was at the 2009 International Documentary Festival of Amsterdam (IDFA). The film was slightly altered for its U.S. premiere at the 2010 Sundance Film Festival.

It was released theatrically in the U.S. by International Film Circuit on 31 July 2011 and went on to play in more than 40 American cities. It has also been theatrically released in Great Britain, Thailand and the former Yugoslavia. It is the first Cambodian film to be released in Thailand in 40 years. Pimpaka Towira, managing director of Thai distributor Extra Virgin, said her decision to release the film was difficult at a time when Thailand and Cambodia were engaged in a military conflict.

It has also played more than 80 film festivals worldwide.

Its US television premiere was in the PBS documentary series POV on 12 July 2011.

It has not yet been granted a distribution licence by the Cambodian government, although the film has been shown occasionally at an arthouse cinema in Phnom Penh. In interviews, the filmmakers have speculated that this is because the history is still too sensitive for the current Cambodian government.

== Film and Khmer Rouge Tribunal ==
Following the European and American premieres of the film, the co-investigating judge Marcel Lemonde requested the use of the film as evidence in the case he was investigating against Nuon Chea.

The filmmakers declined to depose the film with the court on the basis that it would be a breach of the understanding reached with all Khmer Rouge sources. All sources were happy for any and all material to be put in the public domain, but only on the basis that neither filmmaker was an officer or agent of the court. The filmmakers were widely criticised for not handing over their material to the court. On 9 April 2010, the court issued an Order stating that it would not seek to obtain the material by international rogatory letter but instead wait until the material came into the public domain and seek to use it in the trial then.

On 27 June 2011, the trial of Case 002 against Nuon Chea, Khieu Samphan, Ieng Sary and Ieng Thirith began in Phnom Penh. A number of newspaper reports raised the issue of the use of the film in the trial. The prosecution told Agence France Presse that it wanted the "candid admissions" to be used in the trial. Thet Sambath speculated that Nuon Chea might not make the same admissions during the trial, saying: "Before the court he may say something else. But what he told me was the truth."

== Distribution in Cambodia ==
In July 2010, the Cambodian government declined to give the film a permit for distribution in Cambodia. Sin Chin Chaya, Director of the Ministry of Culture's Cinema Department, said this was because the film was not in Khmer. In fact, much of the film is in Khmer. Many Phnom Penh cinema owners told VOA they were keen to exhibit the film, but needed official permission.

The film made its Phnom Penh premiere at the German-owned arthouse cinema Meta House on 21 July 2010. The screening was attended by staff from the court, journalists, NGO workers and politicians including Mu Sochua. Despite its limited release, the film has generated a level of discussion about the Khmer Rouge that is rare in Cambodia.

In March 2011, Sin Chin Chaya told The Wall Street Journal that the permit had not yet been issued because a "formal permission request" had not been submitted. He remarked that since the Khmer Rouge trial was now underway, the decision to approve was at the ministerial level.

== Reception ==
In January 2010, as a sidebar to the Sundance Film Festival premieres, Sambath and Lemkin showed excerpts of the film to a group of Cambodians living in Salt Lake City, Utah. Many in the audience were refugees from the Killing Fields. Several expressed surprise at their own reactions. Instead of feeling anger and hatred of the perpetrators featured, they had feelings of compassion and forgiveness.

Thousands of Cambodians living abroad especially in the U.S. have watched the film. The film was shown in Long Beach, the largest urban Cambodian population outside of Phnom Penh, in September 2010. Due to the film's sensitive nature, the United Cambodian Community organised a pre-screening meeting to prepare elderly survivors of the Killing Fields for what they would see. The US's second largest Cambodian population, in Lowell, Massachusetts saw the film in November 2010. Another large diaspora community in Minneapolis also saw the film in November. The film is reported to have galvanised "the diaspora to reexamine their country's history and to rethink how to bring reconciliation to the war-torn nation."

Sambath and Lemkin have attended scores of screenings and live film discussions in Asia, Europe and the United States. At the 2010 Sundance Film Festival, they participated in a panel on social justice and documentary entitled "Speaking Truth to Power".

== Victims/perpetrators' videoconference ==
In October 2010, Sambath and Lemkin organised an unprecedented dialogue between survivors of the Killing Fields living in California and three former Khmer Rouge perpetrators. All three had appeared in the film. Khoun, Suon and Choeun travelled to Bangkok in Thailand with Sambath for a live 3 hour discussion held via videoconference with the refugees who attended a legal office in Long Beach, California for the event. According to Lemkin, it was "an end of the Cold War moment. [The victims] have seen the perpetrators as monsters for 30 years. I think they saw that they were just people."

On 15 December 2010, the Los Angeles Times published a feature by Joe Mozingo entitled "Coming to terms with Sadism", which told the story of one man's experience of the October videoconference. Long Beach resident Bo Uce was 4 years old when the Khmer Rouge took power in 1975. He lost several members of his family in the Killing Fields. Uce stated he believed he achieved a "certain peace" in watching the film and then engaging with the perpetrators in the videoconference.

== Critical reception ==
Enemies of the People holds a 100% fresh rating on the review aggregator site Rotten Tomatoes based on 31 reviews, with an average rating of 8.15/10.

Andrew Marr host of BBC Radio 4's Start The Week programme called Enemies of the People "a stunning film – one of the most amazing films I've seen ... it's one of the most gripping and moving films I have ever seen."

Stephen Holden of The New York Times reviewed the film twice. In his first review, he called it "an inspiring film." In his second review, he wrote, "Enemies of the People is extraordinary on several fronts. At times, Mr. Thet Sambath suggests a one-man Cambodian Truth and Reconciliation Commission. Instead of affixing blame, he seeks the healing power of confession."

Andrew Schenker in the Village Voice noted an antecedent in Holocaust cinema: "Taking in Enemies of the People is a little like watching a Cambodian Shoah, but as if we had access to the director's methods and motivations instead of just the astonishing results."

Diego Costa in Slant Magazine concentrated on the film's journey into the psychological dimension of the violence: "This is an extraordinary historical document, an archive of confessions with potential for closure, atonement, and belated punishment from one single man on a mission."

Gary Goldstein of the Los Angeles Times found the film "fascinating," writing, "How the genial Sambath remains so circumspect throughout his taut sessions with Chea is remarkable, as is so much of this must-see exposé."

Elliot V. Kotek in Moving Pictures wrote: "The slow, painful truth is fully revealed in this burning documentary crafted courageously by Sambath and his co-director Lemkin."

In the Financial Times, film critic Nigel Andrews gives the film four out of five stars and sees it in the context of Vietnam War cinema. "War crimes cinema gets a new wrinkle, or scar of honour, in Rob Lemkin and Thet Sambath's enthralling investigative documentary. Shades of Heart of Darkness and Apocalypse Now, as this new Kurtz is tracked to his lair. For Conrad and Coppola the landscape traversed was a jungle. Here it is a jungle of the mind." In a review from Sundance, the same critic wrote:"If vengeance is a dish best served cold, this dish is at once cold and scalding hot."

Derek Malcolm in This is London wrote: "This astonishing documentary by Cambodian journalist Thet Sambath, whose entire family was killed by the Khmer Rouge, gets as near as anyone has done to discovering how and why the killing fields happened."

Derek Adams of Time Out gives the film five out of five stars: "This is patient, persistent, probing and fearless journalism of the highest order and it shocks to the core."

David Parkinson in Radio Times sounds a note of caution: "The methodology employed by Thet and co-director Rob Lemkin is occasionally manipulative and the truth often remains elusive. But this is absolutely compelling, nonetheless."

David Edwards in The Daily Mirror is moved by the film's denouement: "The moment when Sambath reveals the price his own family paid is stirring stuff."

Ron Wilkinson in Monsters and Critics pays tribute to the journalism, writing: "One of the most amazing investigative documentary films of all time. The interviews are few but of the highest quality."

Jared Ferrie focuses on the probative and forensic value of the journalism in The Christian Science Monitor: "In the film, Nuon admits publicly, for the first time, that he ordered the killing of thousands of political opponents, which is probably evidence enough to convict him for war crimes – if he ever makes it to trial."

Patrick Barta in The Wall Street Journal found it to be "not only … a historical document, but also … a work of art in its own right."

== Film festivals ==
=== Awards ===
- 2010: Sundance Film Festival World Jury Special Prize
- 2010: True/False Film Festival True Life Award
- 2010: Santa Barbara International Film Festival Best Documentary
- 2010: Santa Barbara International Film Festival Social Justice Award
- 2010: Vera Film Festival, Finland Best Documentary
- 2010: One World Festival (Prague) Grand Jury Prize
- 2010: Full Frame Festival Anne Dellinger Grand Jury Award
- 2010: Full Frame Festival Charles E Guggenheim Emerging Artist
- 2010: Hong Kong International Film Festival Outstanding Documentary Award
- 2010: Beldocs, Belgrade Best Documentary Award
- 2010: OxDox (UK) Best Documentary Award
- 2010: Norwegian Documentary Festival Best Documentary Award
- 2010: Human Rights Watch Film Festival New York Nestor Almendros Award
- 2010: Kraków International Film Festival Silver Horn Award
- 2010: Jerusalem International Film Festival "In the Spirit of Freedom" Ostrovsky Award
- 2010: Dokufest Kosovo Human Rights Award
- 2010: Batumi International Art-House Film Festival Grand Prix
- 2010: Ojai Film Festival Best Documentary
- 2010: Moet British Independent Film Awards (BIFA) Best Documentary
- 2011: DocsBarcelona TV3 Human Rights Award
- 2011: DocEdge NZ Best International Feature
- 2011: DocEdge NZ Best Directing
- 2011: Makedox, Macedonia, Best Human Rights Presentation
- 2011: Makedox, Macedonia, Award for Best Moral Approach
- 2011: Knight International Journalism Award
- 2012: Emmy Award for Outstanding Investigative Journalism (Long Form)

=== Nominations ===
- 2011: Writers Guild of America Best Documentary Screenplay
- 2009: International Documentary Festival of Amsterdam (IDFA) Best Feature Documentary
- 2010: Grierson Award for Best Cinema Documentary

== Awards and honors ==
Enemies of the People was shortlisted for the Academy Award for Best Documentary Feature in 2011. In 2012, the film won an Emmy Award for Outstanding Investigative Journalism (Long Form). In June 2011, the U.S.-based International Center for Journalists (ICFJ) announced that Thet Sambath was the recipient of its 2011 Knight International Journalism Award for his career achievement. In its press release, the ICFJ called Enemies of the People "arguably the most important film about the Khmer Rouge." ICFJ President and member of the jury Joyce Barnathan said Sambath's work was "an amazing, amazing journalistic feat".

== Further Investigation ==
Thet Sambath and Rob Lemkin have announced they are making a second film based on the material shot for their first film with new material being gathered from new Khmer Rouge sources. The film is entitled "Suspicious Minds" and will investigate the political conflict inside the Khmer Rouge movement that drove the violence. Lemkin has further stated this film will explain for the first time why the Killing Fields happened.

Sambath and Lemkin continue to blog on their researches, adding material on Nuon Chea's early career and Pol Pot's rise to power in the Khmer Rouge.

In June 2011, they began to upload further interview excerpts with Nuon Chea. Topics so far include: revolution, killing traitors, confessions, smashing, Year Zero, the nation.

== Interviews ==
- Nuon Chea aka "Brother Number Two"
- Khoun
- Suon
- Sister "Em"

== See also ==
- Kang Kek Iew
