= David Madden (entrepreneur) =

David Madden is an Australian entrepreneur associated with progressive causes. He is a co-founder of GetUp! a web-based political movement, and Avaaz, a global advocacy movement. He is passionate about rock climbing. In 2015, Madden founded Phandeeyar, a technology seed accelerator based in Yangon, Myanmar.

== Early life and education ==
Madden grew up in Canberra and served as an Army officer before studying Arts and Law at the University of New South Wales in Sydney. Madden excelled in the law of the sea. Madden served as president of the University of New South Wales Student Guild.

After winning the University Medal in History, Madden was awarded Fulbright and Frank Knox scholarships to study at Harvard Kennedy School at Harvard University, where he completed his master's degree in public policy. He met Jeremy Heimans, with whom he later co-founded GetUp and Avaaz, waiting for a scholarship interview panel while studying at Harvard. Madden and Heimans became involved in the Harvard Living Wage campaign in 2001, and Madden credits it as their first political collaboration.

== Career ==
Madden has worked for the World Bank in Timor Leste, and for the United Nations in Indonesia. He is the co-author of Imagining Australia: Ideas for Our Future (Allen & Unwin, 2004), with economist turned federal MP Andrew Leigh, Macgregor Duncan, and Peter Tynan.

In 2004, Madden was one of the founders of Win Back Respect, a web-based campaign against the foreign policy of United States President George W. Bush. The following year, together with Jeremy Heimans, he co-founded GetUp, a similar campaign against the recently re-elected Howard government in Australia, inspired by what he had seen with MoveOn in the United States. In 2006, Madden and Heimans were credited by the World E-Government Forum as being among the top 10 people involved in changing the world of the internet and politics. He subsequently stepped back from the day-to-day operations of GetUp, but maintained a position on the organisation's board. Madden and Heimans subsequently ran a political consultancy in the United States, before co-founding international campaigning outfit Avaaz.

In the private sector, Madden is credited with the creation and marketing of TwitterPeek, the world's only mobile Twitter-only device. CNN named it as one of their top 10 tech fails of 2009.
