= Euodia Samson =

South African actress (born 1970)

- Born: Euodia Samson; 1970 (age 55–56); Cape Flats, South Africa
- Education: University of Cape Town
- Occupations: Actress, Presenter
- Years active: 1993–present
- Height: 1.53 m (5 ft 0 in)

Euodia Samson (born 1970) is a South African actress and TV personality. She is best known for the roles in the television serials such as; SOS, Arendsvlei, Big Okes, Madam & Eve and Fishy Feshuns.

== Personal life ==
Euodia Samson was born in 1970 in Cape Flats, Cape Town, South Africa. After finishing high school, she joined with the drama group in Lavender Hill. Then she performed in many productions at the Baxter Theatre. During this period, she was offered a bursary by Mavis Taylor to study at University of Cape Town (UCT). Then in 1993, she graduated with a degree in Performer's Diploma in Speech and Drama from the UCT.

She met her husband in 1994 who was a sound engineer at the Baxter at that time. The couple has three sons.

== Career ==
During her life at UCT, she performed at the stage plays such as: Romeo and Juliet, Othello, The Cherry Orchard, Antigone and Animal Farm. Meanwhile, she also worked for Cape Performing Arts Board (CAPAB), and on their Schools Program called "War on Waste". In the preceding years, she continued to appear in stage apart from cinema and television, and Euodia performed in many theatre productions such as; Freaks, A Winter's Tale, A Midsummer Night's Dream, Dying Breed and Sister Breyani, Dying Breed (CAPAB 1993), Suip! (1993), The Winter's Tale (1997), Ons Hou Konsert (1999), Buckingham Palace, District Six (2000-2001), Vatmaar (2002 and 2003), Die Joseph en Mary Affair (2007 and 2008), Sister Breyani (2007 and 2009). Then she played the role "Roxy" for the Baxter Theatre and as "Mustardseed" in 1995 production of A Midsummer Night's Dream produced by Maynardville.

In 1995, she made her film debut with direct-to-video film The Pink Leather Chair where she played the role of "Gloria". Then in 1996, she made her television debut with the serial Tussen Duiwels and played the role "Gawa September". In 1997, she played the role "Amina Davids" in SABC2 comedy drama Onder Draai die Duiwel Rond. In 2003, Euodia played the role "Christina" in the third season of SABC2 comedy Fishy Fêshuns. In 2006, she acted in the Heartlines film "The Piano" with the role "Elsie Daniels". In 2011, she acted in the film Black Butterflies with the role "Muslim woman". In the same year, she joined with the SABC2 variety comedy series Colour TV and played multiple roles. Meanwhile, she also voiced in the radio play Goud en Silwer for SABC. In 2015, she teamed up with the Tim Noakes Foundation and Groote Schuur Hospital doctor Hassina Kajee. They conducted the Banting program in Ocean View.

Apart from them, she also appeared in the television serials such as SOS, Big Okes, Madam & Eve, all telecast in e.tv and then in the serials: Backstage, Tussen Duiwels, Newshounds and Khululeka. In the preceding years, she acted in the films such as; Cape of Good Hope, Ali Barber, and Crossroads. In 2017, Euodia appeared in three serials: as "Sharifa Cassim" in the danZ!, as "Fiona Abrahams" in the Waterfront and as "Gevangenis se 'Ma'" in the Die Byl. In 2018, she appeared in the kykNET & kie telenovela Arendsvlei. She continued to play the role for three consecutive seasons. In the meantime, she joined with three seasons: Projek Dina, Projek Dina and Sara se Geheim in 2020. In the same year, she played the role "Zainab Petersen" in the film Twisted Christmas.

== Filmography ==
Year	Film	Role	Genre	Ref.
1995	The Pink Leather Chair	Gloria	TV movie	
1996	Tussen Duiwels	Gawa September	TV series	
1997	Onder Draai die Duiwel Rond	Amina Davids	TV series	
2003	Fishy Fêshuns	Christina	TV series	
2006	Heartlines	Elsie Daniels	TV series	
2011	Black Butterflies	Muslim woman	Film	
	Backstage	Guest role	TV series	
2011	Colour TV	Many roles	TV series	
2013	Felix	Mrs. January	Film	
2013	Bullets Oor Bishop Lavis	Malaysia	Short film	
2014	Die Windpomp	Karmienella	Film	
2017	danZ!	Sharifa Cassim	TV series	
2017	Waterfront	Fiona Abrahams	TV series	
2017	Die Byl	Gevangenis se "Ma"	TV series	
2018	Arendsvlei	Hazel Bastiaan	TV series	
2020	Projek Dina	Ma Versveld	TV series	
2020	Twisted Christmas	Zainab Petersen	Film	
2020	Projek Dina	Mrs Versveld Snr.	TV series	
2020	Sara se Geheim	Aunty Girlie	TV series	
2021	Beauty of Africa	Angeliena	Short film	
2021	Angeliena	Angeliena	Film	
