= Rosetta, KwaZulu-Natal =

Rosetta eLuzethe
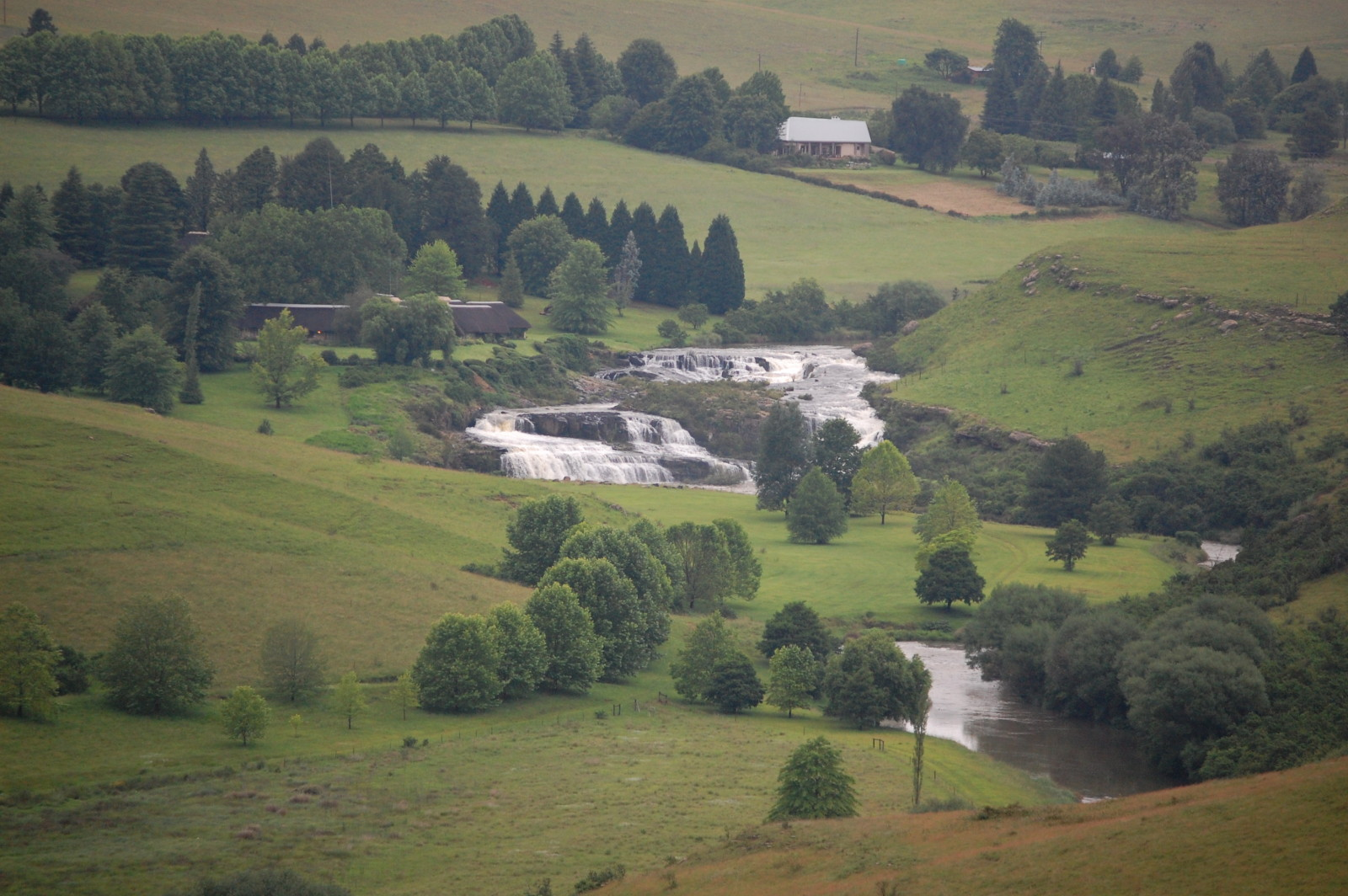
- Mooi River Falls near Rosetta

- Location within KwaZulu-Natal Location within South Africa
- Coordinates: 29.306°S 29.978°E
- Country: South Africa
- Province: KwaZulu-Natal
- District: uMgungundlovu
- Municipality: Mpofana

Area
  - Total: 13.47 km^{2} (5.20 sq mi)

Population (2011)
  - Total: 557
  - Density: 41.4/km^{2} (107/sq mi)

Racial makeup (2011)
  - Black African: 64.6%
  - Indian/Asian: 1.6%
  - White: 32.9%
  - Other: 0.9%

First languages (2011)
  - Zulu: 59.5%
  - English: 33.6%
  - Afrikaans: 4.1%
  - Other: 2.7%
- Time zone: UTC+2 (SAST)
- PO box: 3301
- Area code: 033

Rosetta is a village in Mpofana Local Municipality in the KwaZulu-Natal province of South Africa.

Rosetta is known for the case of Elizabeth Klarer, who in 1955 claimed to have been abducted by aliens on a hill outside the town.
