= Kuli Roberts =

South African tabloid journalist

- Born: Nomakula Roberts; 16 December 1972; South Africa
- Died: 9 February 2022 (aged 49); Johannesburg, South Africa
- Occupations: Journalist, television presenter, actress
- Spouse: Berwyn 'Bez' Roberts (m. 1990, divorced)
- Children: 2
- Relatives: Hlubi Mboya, Rethabile Mboya (sisters), Siyanda Mboya (brother)

Nomakula Kuli Roberts (16 December 1972 – 9 February 2022) was a South African fashion and beauty tabloid journalist, television presenter, author and actress. She was popularly known for co-hosting the SABC2 reality television show What Not To Wear and as a presenter and commentator on SABC3's daily talk show Trending SA.

== Career ==
Kuli began her journalism career with Pace magazine. She was the editor of Drum Magazine, Fashion, and Beauty. Kuli was also a columnist of Sunday World.

From 2004 to 2005, she was a TV Host at SABC2 reality television show What Not To Wear. From 2008 to 2009, Kuli co-hosted the SABC1 gossip show called The Real Goboza for the second and third seasons. From 2010 to 2013 she hosted the celebrity gossip magazine show Headline.

In 2011, she drew criticism after writing a piece in her column about the "pros and cons" of dating mixed-race women. The media company which owned the tabloid that the column was in said that the piece was "derogatory" and "enforced racial stereotypes".

From 2012 to 2013, Kuli played a fictional version of herself in the Mzansi Magic TV series iNkaba. From 2020 to 2021, she played Mildred Sefatsa on Seasons 4 and 5 of the soapie The Queen. She also played Tina in the Netflix movie Angeliena (2021).

In 2019, her novel Siren was published.

== Personal life and death ==
From 1990, she was married to Berwyn 'Bez' Roberts, but they later divorced. Together they had two children. Her sister, Hlubi Mboya, is known for her role as HIV-positive Nandipha on the SABC3 soap opera, Isidingo.

Roberts died on 9 February 2022, at the age of 49.
