= Elizabeth Klarer =

South African alien contactee claimant (1910–1994)

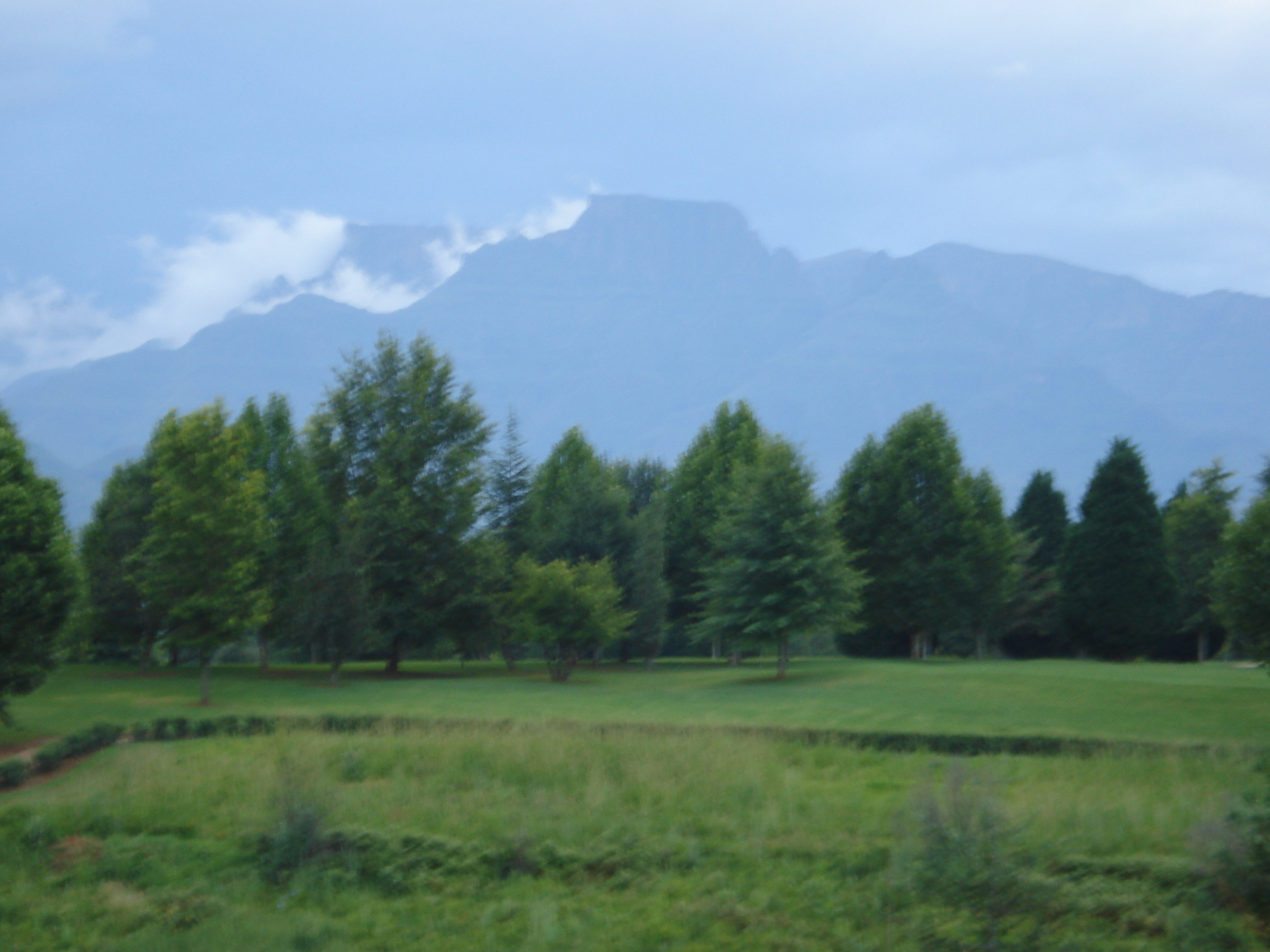
- Cathkin Peak plateau 29°04′29″S 29°21′04″E, supposed scene of a day-long rendezvous with Akon during which Ayling was conceived.
- Born: 1 July 1910; Mooi River, Natal, South Africa
- Died: 9 February 1994 (aged 83); Durban, KwaZulu-Natal
- Known for: Claimed to have been contacted by extraterrestrials between 1954 and 1963
- Spouses: William Stafford Phillips (m. 1932) Paul Klarer (m. 1946) Aubrey Fielding (m. 1963)
- Children: 3

Elizabeth Klarer (née Woollatt; 1 July 1910 – 9 February 1994) was a South African woman who, starting in 1956, publicly claimed to have been contacted by aliens multiple times between 1954 and 1963. Her first visitation allegedly occurred when she was seven. She also claimed to have had a sexual relationship with an extraterrestrial as an adult, and is credited as one of the first women to make this claim. She promoted an ideal of a better world and beliefs in a cosmic consciousness. In her book Beyond the Light Barrier, she strived to convey a message of peace, love, understanding, and environmentalism, which she credited to the superior wisdom of an advanced and immaculately utopian Venusian civilization. She promoted conspiracy theories of an international cover-up that kept vital information from the public, and claimed to have been threatened with abduction to press her into revealing details about alien technology.

== Biography ==
Klarer was born at Mooi River, Natal, the youngest daughter of Samuel Bancroft ("SB") Woollatt and Florence Woollatt. SB was a pioneering veterinary surgeon who subsequently settled at Connington farm near Rosetta in the Natal midlands, where he became a successful shorthorn farmer, and as a dedicated polo player, introduced young people to the sport.

It was there that, at age seven, Elizabeth and her older sister Barbara claimed to have had their first UFO encounter. While feeding their Sealyham puppies outside the farmhouse, Elizabeth and her sister claimed they witnessed a silver disc bathed in a pearly luster that swooped over them. A giant, orange-red, cratered planetoid was simultaneously observed orbiting and rotating high in the atmosphere. The disc rushed to meet it, pacing and guiding it northwards, while the planetoid left a smoke trail in its wake.

Only months later, she claimed another sighting in the company of Ladam, their Zulu farm manager. Ladam interpreted the sighting in terms of traditional Zulu beliefs. Klarer sometimes alluded to an even earlier sighting at age three, in either 1913 or 1914.

Klarer graduated from St. Anne's Diocesan College in Pietermaritzburg and moved to Florence, Italy, to study art and music. She then completed a four-year diploma in meteorology at Girton College, Cambridge, and was taught by her first husband to fly a Tiger Moth light aircraft. In 1932, the three Woollatt sisters and Maureen Taylor formed the Connington polo team and drew a match against the Durban ladies' team, seen as the first officially recorded ladies' match in South Africa. During a 1937 flight from Durban to Baragwanath in a Leopard Moth aircraft, Klarer and her husband reportedly saw a saucer that approached, coasted along, then departed. During World War II, she held a responsible position in RAF Intelligence.

Klarer believed in telepathic powers, and tried to enhance these abilities since her youth.

=== Flying Saucer Hill ===
In 1954, Klarer's sister May, then residing on the farm Whyteleafe in the Natal midlands, relayed to her that the native Zulu people were reporting appearances of the lightning bird in the sky. In response, Elizabeth and her children travelled from Johannesburg to the farm, and she ascended Flying Saucer Hill the following day, 27 December. It was there that she claimed to have seen the starship descend. It hovered three metres (9.8 ft) above ground, emitting only a soft hum. Its hull was spinning, though its central dome remained stationary. The spaceman, who later identified himself as Akon, was supposedly clearly visible through one of three portholes, but a barrier of heat that emanated from the ship prevented her from approaching, and his scout ship departed again.

On 7 April 1956, she visited the hilltop again, after further reports of the "lightning bird". This time, Akon took her aboard his scout ship, a craft some 60 feet (18 m) in diameter. Inside, she met a second pilot, stocky and darker-skinned than Akon, who was supposedly a botanist as well as an astrophysicist. She was allegedly shown a lens that offered views through the craft's floor. With only a hum emanating from below and no sense of movement, they were transported to the enormous cigar-shaped mother ship which had a garden-like interior. After meeting its inhabitants, she was returned to the hilltop, a similar arrangement as that made between noted ufologist George Adamski and Adamski's alleged extraterrestrial acquaintance "Orthon" in 1952. During the encounter, kisses were exchanged. Akon purportedly revealed that Elizabeth was not only a reincarnated Venusian, but also a long-lost soulmate. He further explained that they occasionally took Earth women as partners, as the offspring strengthened their race with an infusion of new blood. He also claimed that a number of Venusians were surreptitiously living among human beings.

From 17:45 on 30 April 1956, various observers noted a steady, red glow poised at a rocky section of the hill, which remained there until 2:00 the following morning. No sign of a fire could be found afterwards.

On 17 July 1956, after their family farm was sold, Klarer revisited the area and claimed to have taken a series of seven photos of Akon's scout ship using her sister's (or daughter's) simple Brownie box camera. She claimed that vivid light flashes turned into a dull grey craft enveloped in a shimmering heat haze, and that the disc darted silently over a rise near the farmhouse for an hour, making several weaving detours. It shone like silver in bright sunlight before streaking away out of sight. Edgar Sievers, a ufologist from Pretoria, said that Klarer's family saw her leave the homestead alone, and suggested that the frail Elizabeth would have found it difficult to throw a car hubcap and photograph it at the same time. He also stated that no type of hubcap was known to sufficiently resemble the disc in the photos.

Location of Flying Saucer Hill, Klarer's claimed contact site since 1954, near Rosetta, KwaZulu-Natal: 29°20′41″S 29°51′35″E

=== Space-motherhood ===
In April 1958, a series of contacts reportedly started that set Klarer's story apart from the UFO stories that were standard in the 1950s. Klarer claimed that Akon's visits culminated in a day-long rendezvous with Elizabeth on the high plateau of Cathkin Peak, that he presented her with a silver ring that enhanced their telepathic connection, that their love was consummated, and that a child was conceived.

I surrendered in ecstasy to the magic of his love making, our bodies merging in magnetic union as the divine essence of our spirits became one.

Klarer claimed that after a terrestrial pregnancy, she and her MG car were transported in 1959 to Akon's home planet, Meton, orbiting Proxima Centauri in the nearby multiple-star system Alpha Centauri. There she delivered a son, who was given the name Ayling. He stayed behind on Meton to be educated, while Elizabeth reluctantly came home. Meton's planetary vibrations supposedly affected her heart, and she was consequently not permitted to return, instead receiving follow-up visits from Akon and Ayling. The whole trip, delivery, and return voyage supposedly took no more than four months, but due to differences in space-time, allowed her a nine-year stay on Meton.

There were no cities or skyscrapers as Earth people know them anywhere on Meton. Homes were scattered in park-like grounds... There was an abundance of all things needed by civilization – food, water and all materials for building, an unlimited supply of energy on tap from the atmosphere and the Universe, no shortages of any kind and no monetary system at all.

Two decades passed before Klarer published a book, Beyond the Light Barrier (1980), about her alleged extraterrestrial encounters. On his world lecture tour in the late 1950s, George Adamski made a point of visiting South Africa and looking up Klarer for a chat on their variety of experiences with the friendly, wise "space brothers". By that time, Klarer was not the only Adamski follower to experience claimed space-motherhood.

=== Later years ===
After her sister and brother-in-law died, Elizabeth returned from Natal to Johannesburg. There she worked for a time in a CNA book store, but found city life stifling. From the 1950s onwards, her unorthodox claims made her a subject of interest by the press, where she also faced ridicule. She reportedly welcomed any press however, as she deemed the dissemination of Akon's purported message as paramount – a life-task of extreme importance. The account of her observations and contact experience in the November–December 1956 issue of Flying Saucer Review was noticed by Edith Nicolaisen. Nicolaisen's correspondence with Elizabeth consists of 23 letters, written from 1956 to 1976. She published the Klarer story in the small booklet I rymdskepp över Drakensberg in 1959, and a second edition appeared in 1967. From about 1960 to 1966, Elizabeth worked on the manuscript for her book, which now included the Akon love saga, as she couldn't "hide the truth in these matters". In 1968, Elizabeth agreed to be interviewed by ufologist Cynthia Hind, and Hind's write-up of her story appeared in the August issue of Fate. Ufologist Kitty Smith established contact with Elizabeth after reading about her in Outspan magazine, and claimed her own sighting of Akon's ship in January 1984.

When another South African, Ann Grevler, claimed alien contact in the late 1950s, Elizabeth was outspoken and issued various challenges to her, calling on Grevler to defend her statements in an open forum. She likewise denounced Philipp Human's supposed contact through a trance medium, and this caused a rift between them. In her view, the space people would never stoop to such methods. In 1975, she was invited by Hermann Oberth to attend the 11th International Congress of UFO Research Groups in Wiesbaden, Germany. She delivered an address there on 2 November, for which she received a standing ovation. In May 1992, Smith arranged a talk by Klarer at the Unidentified Flying Object Club in Pietermaritzburg. This was so popular that the crowd grew too large to accommodate.

Elizabeth faithfully commemorated the 7 April anniversary of her union with Akon by returning to Flying Saucer Hill. On one occasion, she befriended SAAF helicopter pilots who sought shelter on the farm during a storm, and they facilitated visits to the hill when a ride on horseback became too difficult for her. Her third husband, Aubrey Fielding, died in 1981 and his ashes were strewn on the hill. Elizabeth died of breast cancer at age 83, leaving her second book, The Gravity File, unfinished. The book filled in the gaps of the first. It elucidated the military and political aspects of UFO research and further explained Akon's "electro-gravity propulsion" technology. Before her death, she related to acquaintances that Ayling (like Akon) was now an astrophysicist, who was crisscrossing the universe with his father, his space woman Clea, and their son.

== Criticism and reception ==
Ufologist Thomas Streicher concluded that Klarer's claims are generally poorly substantiated, despite some of them being corroborated by witnesses. Although her sister and first husband attested two UFO sightings, witnesses are lacking to confirm her pregnancy, and it remains unknown whether it was ever documented. He speculates that she was perhaps a fantasy-prone individual who merely imagined most of her experiences. Elizabeth's son David, in particular, has no recollection of an event, absence, or pregnancy in 1959 that could tie in with her purported claims.

Ufologist Cynthia Hind noted Elizabeth's absolute conviction that she was telling the truth, and never suspected that she was deliberately lying. Hind suspected that an active imagination or illusions borne from a dream-state of euphoria were to be blamed for the improbabilities and inconsistencies inherent in her stories. However, both Hind and Smith alluded to sightings of Akon by members of the public, and Hind concluded: "all these factors need examination and it is time we stopped casting aside [such] cases which, although sounding like hoaxes, are not obviously so." Ufologist Edgar Sievers, who also interviewed her family, was completely satisfied that her experiences, at least up to and including the photographs, were of a physical rather than psychic nature.

Ufologist Philipp Human was initially a proponent of Elizabeth's claims, but later changed his stance: "I do not believe one word of her supposed […] contacts and it was a standing joke the way she was helped to photograph an ordinary motor car hubcap. So much for her photographs […] That was before she added additional material to tell of her pregnancy caused by her Venusian lover, […] I pray that this book will never be published." To this, Edith Nicolaisen replied: "Don't be afraid, we shall never publish [the story of her Venusian lover, but] I would like to reprint [the] booklet about her contacts. I do believe that she has had some sort of contact."

The Mensa chapter of Johannesburg dismissed her claims, and she was heckled during her address. Hard evidence for her claim that she addressed the House of Lords in 1983, and that a paper of hers was read during that year at a UFO congress at the United Nations, has not been found. Supposed hard evidence presented by Elizabeth included her set of 1956 photographs, the ring she received from Akon, a space rock or crystal, and a fern from Meton. Her supportive husband Aubrey remained unperturbed by his wife's love for Akon, reportedly saying, "That's all right with me – as long as he stays in space where he belongs".

== In popular culture ==
Elizabeth Klarer is mentioned in the song Even Elizabeth Klarer on the album Shakey is Good (2008) by South African singer-songwriter Jim Neversink.

Elizabeth Klarer is the subject of focus on Episode 477: Elizabeth Klarer of the podcast show The Last Podcast on the Left.

In 2023, a documentary about Elizabeth Klarer and her claims, entitled Beyond the Light Barrier, was directed by Uga Carlini.

== Publications ==
- Jenseits der Lichtmauer: Vorgeschichte und Bericht einer Weltraumreise (1977)
- Beyond the Light Barrier (1980)
