= Phandeeyar =

- Company type: Accelerator
- Headquarters: Yangon, {{{location_country}}}
- Founder: David Madden
- CEO: Jes Kaliebe Petersen
- Website: phandeeyar.org
- Current status: Liquidated

Phandeeyar (Burmese: ဖန်တီးရာ; lit. 'creation place') is a technology seed accelerator based in Yangon, Myanmar. Formally beginning in 2015, Phandeeyar provides funding and training for emerging startups. Phandeeyar also conducts trainings, hosts workshops, and holds competitions for startups within the digital sector.

== Background ==
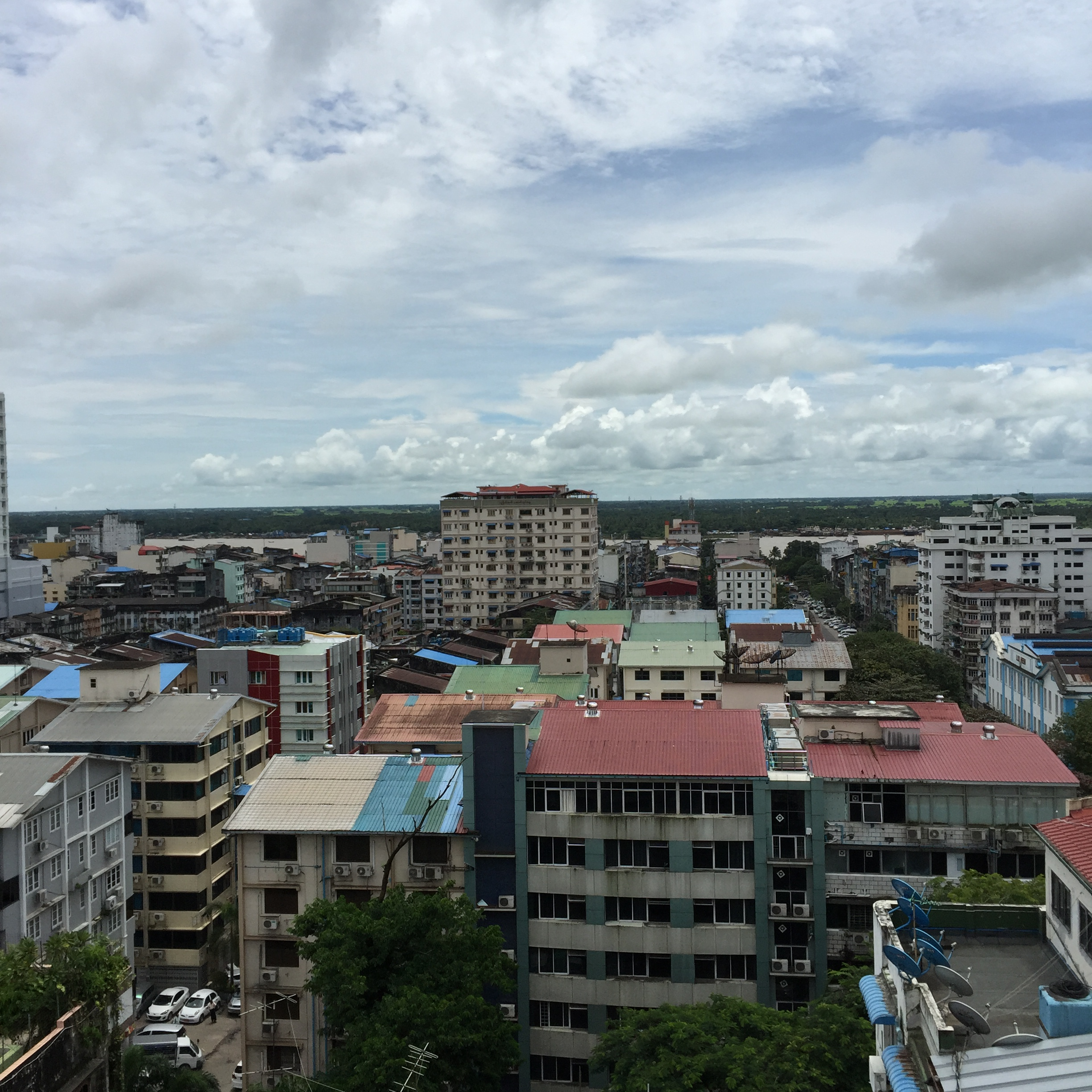
Yangon, Myanmar

In 2014, Phandeeyar emerged from a hackathon named "Code for Change Myanmar", where its founder and current CEO, David Madden, wanted to promote the growth of Myanmar's digital sector. Through this hackathon, politics and elections were addressed.

Madden states the need for better financial support for emerging start-ups in Myanmar, which also led to the creation of the accelerator.

=== Funding ===
Phandeeyar's sponsors and investors include the Omidyar Network which has donated 2 million US dollars to the company, the United States Institute of Peace, and the Schmidt Family Foundation.

== Mission ==
David Madden states that Phandeeyar's objective is to connect those in the tech field with others actively working in the social sector through different events.

=== Events and initiatives ===
In 2015, Phandeeyar hosted a two-week event called "MaePaySoe" (မဲပေးစို့; lit. 'let's vote') where more than one hundred web developers gathered to create technology which informs the general public about potential political candidates in Myanmar and the country's voting process.

=== Seed funding ===
In 2016, around fifteen to twenty startups were projected to be accepted into the accelerator in a three-year span. Phandeeyar also plans to invest around $2 million into startups in the near future. From the startups accepted, Phandeeyar would claim a 12 percent ownership of the companies. Those selected for Phandeeyar's 6-month training program would receive a funding of $25,000 to launch their ventures, in addition to business partnerships to help with the early stages of their startups. These partnerships include leaders from regional companies such as the Myanmar Information Technology, CarsDB, Muru-D, and Golden Gate Ventures. Towards the end of the program, companies have the opportunity to pitch their startup ideas to venture capitalists and angel investors.

==== Select startups from Phandeeyar ====
Chate Sat is a digital platform to connect freelance workers with employers to find jobs. After its launch from Phandeeyar, Chate Sat recruited around 800 businesses looking for contract work and 5,000 freelancers. Chate Sat also received funding from some investors such as Vulpes Investment Management Ltd.

GoP is an online, tourism-based website that compiles different traveling information into one platform. Nyunt Win Aung, one of the company's co-founders, states that its increased website traffic will increase their bookings, directly as a result of more funding.

White Merak is a phone application used to read comics made by local artists and the company's team. Additionally, this platform shows animated comics, as well as a bilingual setting where users can switch comic text from Burmese to English and vice versa.

EZ Stay is an online hotel booking platform co-founded by Aung Phyo Lwin (CEO) and Lwin Htoo Ko (CTO) focused on informing those traveling to Myanmar about different hotel and motel availabilities. According to Aung Phyo Lwin, this website can better market local Myanmar businesses.

== News ==
In April 2018, Myanmar civil rights groups and Myanmar-based technology companies accused Facebook of failing to effectively detect hate speech online in Myanmar, which many have claimed to have contributed to an anti-Rohingya sentiment in the country. Phandeeyar, along with other companies, released an open letter to the social media platform, posing questions about Facebook's transparency in accordance with these issues and the possible implications of social media with current events in Myanmar.
