= GetUp! =

Australian political activist group

- Formation: 2005; 21 years ago
- Headquarters: Sydney, Australia
- Key people: Larissa Baldwin-Roberts (CEO)
- Website: www.getup.org.au

GetUp!, often referred to without punctuation as GetUp, is an independent progressive Australian political activist group. It was launched in August 2005 to encourage Internet activism in Australia, though it has increasingly engaged in offline community organising.

GetUp is an independent, issue-based organisation. It advocates for progressive public policy change in Australia in the areas of the environment, economy, human rights, and democracy. GetUp does not make financial donations to, or receive donations from, registered Australian political parties, and does not run or fund candidates at Australian elections.

== History ==
GetUp was co-founded by Jeremy Heimans, David Madden, both graduates of Harvard Kennedy School at Harvard University, and Amanda Tattersall (who also founded the Sydney Alliance and is an associate professor at Sydney University). in August 2005.

The launch was accompanied by a television advertising campaign. Its initial campaign aimed to help voters to "keep the Howard government accountable" after it won a majority of seats in the Australian Senate on 9 August 2005, following the 2004 Australian federal election. GetUp encouraged visitors to send an email to Coalition senators that read "I'm sending you this message because I want you to know that I'm watching. Now that you have absolute power in the Senate, it is only people like me who can hold you accountable. And we will."

Brett Solomon was the first executive director of GetUp and served until 2008, when he left to join Avaaz. Early members of GetUp's board were drawn from across the political spectrum, and included Cate Faehrmann, Bill Shorten (then National Secretary of the Australian Workers' Union), former leader of the Liberal Party, John Hewson, and entrepreneur Evan Thornley.

Simon Sheikh was the National Director of GetUp from 2008 to July 2012.

Sam McLean was the National Director of GetUp from July 2012 (at the age of 24) to July 2015.

Paul Oosting was the GetUp! National Director from 2019 to 2022.

Larissa Baldwin-Roberts was appointed CEO from 2022 to March 2025. Baldwin is a Widjabul Wia-bul woman of the Bundjalung people, and was previously campaign manager. She had also worked internationally, is an expert on the gas industry in Australia, and co-founded Seed Mob, the first Indigenous youth climate network.

Paul Ferris serves as the current CEO of GetUp.

== Governance and funding ==
GetUp is a non-profit organisation, registered as GetUp Ltd.

=== People ===
Founding members include David Madden and Jeremy Heimans, co-founders of international activist groups Avaaz, Purpose, and Win Back Respect; and Amanda Tattersall, co-founder of Labor for Refugees and the Sydney Alliance, and is an associate professor at Sydney University.

In 2018, GetUp had 70 staff, and an annual budget of about A$10 million.

As of 2019 the chair of GetUp was Phil Ireland, managing director of the Online Progressive Engagement Network, while deputy chair was Carla McGrath, a campaigner on Torres Strait Islander issues. Other members of the board were Daniel Stone, director of digital campaign firm Principle Co; Min Guo, a barrister specialising in class actions, human rights and immigration; Stephen Monk, an IT entrepreneur, consultant and software developer; Karen Iles, a human rights lawyer; Sara Saleh, a racial justice and Palestine campaigner; Alex Rafalowicz, a communications manager at 350.org; and Lyn Goldsworthy, executive officer at the Frank Fenner Foundation and environmental activist.

=== Funding ===
Getup's initial funding of $50,000 was donated by the Labor Council of New South Wales at the suggestion of Amanda Tattersall. The second major donation was the Australian Workers' Union with $100,000, after which the AWU national secretary Bill Shorten served as a GetUp board member until 2006. GetUp's largest donation in its early years was $1.1 million from the Construction, Forestry, Maritime, Mining and Energy Union in 2012. However GetUp has not received donations from unions since 2012. It does not make financial donations to, or receive donations from, registered Australian political parties.

GetUp's 2015 accounts indicated that 4% of its total revenue for the year was received from large individual donations that had to be declared to the Australian Electoral Commission (at the time, any donation above A$13,000). GetUp noted in its 2015 Annual Report that 11,700 core members donated 45% of the organisation's annual revenue.

In 2017, GetUp disclosed $217,418 in gifts worth more than $13,200 and used on political expenditure over the year. Approximately $106,000 of this came from overseas sources, including German sister-organisation Campact and Swiss-based Oak Philanthropy. In 2018, GetUp raised more than $11 million in donations.

GetUp is funded predominantly by thousands of small donations from Australian individuals, in the vein of similar counterparts in other countries, such as MoveOn.org. In 2019, around 97 per cent of donations received by GetUp were for amounts under $100. All of its donations are listed on its website within 30 days.

In the 2022-23 financial year GetUp announced a gross revenue of A$7.3 million (down from A$10.467 million in 2021-22). Getup also announced an annual deficit of A$1.3 million (a A$2.1M loss in 2021-22).

Under Australia's taxation regime, donations to GetUp are not considered tax-deductible as the organisation advocates for changes to government policy.

== Lobbying ==
GetUp campaigns for progressive public-policy change in Australia in the areas of the environment, economy, human rights and democracy.

Historically, GetUp has campaigned primarily using digital Internet activism. In recent years, it has also used offline community organising.

The organisation has employed a range of campaign techniques, including:

- advertising in major daily newspapers in Australia and overseas
- holding local events
- running television commercials
- hiring a skywriter to write "Vote No to Asylum Bill" above Australia's Parliament House in Canberra
- social media engagement
- handing out how-to-vote cards

GetUp encourages members to lobby in its campaign areas, and has encouraged its members to pressure Members of Parliament using form letters, automated online emails, and personal, hand-crafted letters.

=== Campaigns ===
In 2007 the Australian Electoral Commission warned GetUp that it felt its how-to-vote website was "misleading and deceptive", because it always recommended against voting for Coalition candidates, since the Coalition did not provide information to GetUp for inclusion in the online tool.

In 2010, GetUp placed full-page ads in The New York Times and The Washington Times in support of WikiLeaks founder Julian Assange and condemning calls for violence against him.

In 2011, GetUp campaigned to create a permanent Climate Natural Disaster Fund funded by reduction of fossil fuel subsidies and released a video supporting same-sex marriage in Australia, starring Julian Shaw entitled It's Time that was described by The Advocate as "possibly the most beautiful ad for marriage equality we've seen". In March 2011, Getup endorsed the controversial decision of the Gillard Labor government to break its 2010 Election promise not to introduce a carbon tax as a means of addressing Australia's contribution to carbon emissions.

In 2012 GetUp campaigned with Australian Marriage Equality for same-sex marriage by sending 3,000 roses to federal politicians on Valentine's Day and by hosting a dinner for three same-sex couples with the Prime Minister. GetUp also had a Marriage Matters float in the Sydney Mardi Gras. In Queensland, GetUp commissioned a response to a controversial anti-gay marriage advertisement. In response to Catholic bishops in Victoria asking their parishioners to campaign against same sex marriages, Simon Sheikh of GetUp said, "every time they act, they only entice our members to do even more". In May 2012, "GetUp slams PM Gillard" for not following the lead of President Obama on marriage equity. In June 2012, at events in Sydney and Melbourne, GetUp joined with Marie Claire and Sunrise to show support for marriage equality and "everybody's right to say 'I Do'".

In August 2015, emergency services were called to the office of Craig Laundy MP, a federal Liberal party member who blocked a free vote on same-sex marriage. Mr. Laundy was one of a number of MPs who received an envelope containing glitter from the organization, as a protest to the dissents. Laundy later called it a "stupid stunt".

In October 2015, GetUp unreservedly apologised to US rapper Chris Brown for their visa-denial campaign after GetUp said their campaign, "played into a harmful, racist narrative".

During the 2016 federal election GetUp ran a successful campaign targeting the Coalition's more conservative MPs. Part of the campaign involved volunteers calling voters in marginal electorates. 45,000 conversations were had with 18,000 of these being with voters in Bass which was the seat of Andrew Nikolic who was not reelected. Other targeted MPs included Peter Dutton, George Christensen and Louise Markus.

In November 2016 in a submission to a parliamentary inquiry, GetUp lobbied for information on all political donations over $500 to be made publicly available and also advocated for a ban on foreign donations to Australian political parties.

In August 2017, a campaign was started on GetUp's community campaign platform - CommunityRun - calling on the Australian Medical Association to deregister Dr Pansy Lai, following her appearance in the TV ad for the "No" case for the Australian Marriage Law Postal Survey. GetUp! received dozens of complaints and the petition, and it was taken down after being found to breach CommunityRun's terms and conditions.

In September 2017, GetUp campaigned for same-sex marriage ahead of the Australian Marriage Law Postal Survey, which was successful.

During the 2019 Australian federal election, GetUp campaigned against a number of "hard-right" MPs, including Tony Abbott and Peter Dutton. GetUp was reported to have spent up to $4 million on election advertising (mostly focused on specific seats) and distributed 800,000 how-to-vote cards in support of key independents, Labor, and the Greens. Paul Oosting said GetUp volunteers made 712,039 calls to voters and knocked on 36,315 doors during the campaign. Following the election, GetUp claimed credit for defeating Tony Abbott. The campaign was widely seen as unsuccessful; Paul Oosting said that GetUp “hadn't achieved what we set out to achieve,” and GetUp's campaign received criticism from both sides of politics.

In June 2026, during Pauline Hanson’s address at the National Press Club, GetUp unfurled a banner that read, "I opposed a pay rise for workers ... while I took a $100,000 pay rise for myself", alongside a photo of Hanson. The banner was promptly torn down. GetUp CEO Paul Ferris later made a statement claiming responsibility for the stunt, stating, "We thought the occasion deserved some honesty. So we provided it."

=== Prioritising campaigns ===
GetUp uses "membership surveys, voter polls [and] phone and online consultations" to help determine campaign priorities.

The organisation's 2015 survey showed GetUp members wanted the organisation to campaign on refugees, fossil fuels and climate change, and coal developments near the Great Barrier Reef. In the survey, members ranked same-sex marriage as 16th priority.

In 2019, 92% of respondents to GetUp's annual survey wanted the organisation to "target hard-right MPs who block progress." Almost 30,000 people responded to a subsequent online poll organised by GetUp to identify which "hard-right" MPs they wanted to target at the 2019 federal election.

Critics allege that the organisation misrepresents results of their membership surveys. Liberal Party MP Ben Morton has claimed that raw data from the organisation's 2016 election survey, disclosed to the Australian Parliament's Joint Standing Committee on Electoral Matters, showed that respondents had nominated different priorities to those that the organisation eventually campaigned on. The group listed "stopping the government handling over billions of dollars every year to big polluters" in its top three issues, yet the survey results did not reflect this. This criticism led The Australian, a conservative newspaper, to allege that "the nine-member board of GetUp makes all decisions, and that members have no voting rights or say in the direction of the organisation".

== Independence ==
GetUp is an independent, "issue-based" organisation. Although it is an active participant in Australian election campaigns, it is not formally aligned with any Australian political party. It runs its own campaigns and does not contribute to or coordinate with candidate campaigns. It has sometimes rated candidates based on their position on issues, and then provided voters with how-to-vote cards, often recommending votes for more than one option. GetUp states that it is driven by the values and issues of its supporters, fully independent of party loyalties.

The Australian Electoral Commission (AEC) has found that GetUp is "issue-based rather than supporting or advocating support for a particular registered party political." Its independent status has been confirmed by the AEC on three occasions. On each occasion, the AEC's review was initiated at the request of a conservative MP; following referrals by Senator Abetz in 2005 and 2010, and a referral from Ben Morton in 2016. On all three occasions, the AEC found that GetUp did "not appear to be controlled by one or more registered political parties, nor... to operate wholly or to a significant extent to the benefit of one or more registered political parties." In 2010 the AEC acknowledged that many of GetUp's activities "could be reasonably regarded as of some 'benefit' to the 'left' parties", but also noted that many of the activities of GetUp were solely issue-based.

In 2019, the AEC's determination was supported by the Australian Government Solicitor and the Commonwealth Director of Public Prosecutions.

== Criticism ==
Due to the organizations focus on progressive issues, Getup has been criticised by many members of conservative parties, particularly the Coalition parties.

Liberal Party of Australia politicians Eric Abetz, Ben Morton, and Peter Dutton have regularly attacked GetUp's independence since the organisation's effective 2016 election campaign, at various times claiming that the organisation is a "front for the Labor Party", "run by the Greens movement in inner-city Melbourne and Sydney", and funded by billionaire George Soros.

Following the 2019 Australian federal election, Nationals MP Barnaby Joyce criticised GetUp for their unsuccessful campaign in his seat of New England, a very safe seat for the party. In his victory speech, Joyce called GetUp "completely and utterly dopey".

== See also ==
- Getup Ltd v Electoral Commissioner (2010), decision made by the Federal Court allowing Australians to enrol online
- Internet activism
- Advance (conservative political lobbying group)
