= Getup Ltd v Electoral Commissioner =

2010 Australian Federal Court decision allowing Australians to enrol as voters online

- Court: Federal Court of Australia
- Decided: 13 August 2010
- Citation: [2010] FCA 869

Court membership
- Judge sitting: Perram J

Getup Ltd v Electoral Commissioner (2010) was a landmark decision made by the Federal Court of Australia on 13 August 2010 allowing Australians to enrol online in future elections. The Federal Court ruled in favour of GetUp! in their challenge of the Commonwealth Electoral Act 1918, that rejected first-time voter Sophie Trevitt's electronic enrolment application, after her electronic signature was deemed invalid.

== The case ==
In June 2010 it was estimated that more than 1.4 million Australians were not enrolled to vote. in the lead up to the Australian Federal election on 21 August 2010, political activists group GetUp developed a strategy to capture this market by providing an online enrolment facility, OzEnrol, which enabled users to enter the required details into an electronically submittable form, using a digital pen, mouse or laptop trackpad to sign their name. On 22 July 2010, the Australian Electoral Commission disallowed Sophie Trevitts's use of the OzEnrol tool to apply for enrolment in the electorate of Grayndler, NSW.

== Arguments ==
The Commissioner claimed he acted under Section 102(1)(c) of the Commonwealth Electoral Act 1918 granting him the discretion in judging whether Ms Trevitt's enrolment application was “in order”. The criteria for reaching such a decision are outlined in Section 98(2) in particular:

A claim:
(a) must be in the appropriate form; and
(b) must be signed by the claimant;

As a result, the Commissioner ruled Ms Trevitt's application was not in order- citing a breach of Section 336 of the Commonwealth Electoral Act 1918:

Every electoral paper which by this Act or the regulations has to be signed by any person shall be signed by that person with his or her personal signature.

The Electoral Commissioner claimed that the Act implied enrolments were to be signed by hand.

GetUp argued the electronic signature provided by Trevitt was legitimate in accordance with Section 8(1) of the Electronic Transactions Act 1999:

For the purposes of a law of the Commonwealth, a transaction is not invalid because it took place wholly or partly by means of one or more electronic communications.

The Act is applicable to transactions including those "of a non-commercial nature" like that of the enrolment application.

The Commissioner also expressed concerns over the quality of electronic signatures, noting their tendency to become pixilated in comparison to those that were hand-written. In response, GetUp highlighted the Commissioner's frequent acceptance of enrolment forms via facsimile and scanned documents sent through email, recommending applicants do so using the lowest resolution at 100 dots per inch (DPI), thus rendering the signature quality to that comparable to one electronically produced.

== Federal Court decision ==
Justice Perram agreed with GetUp regarding the acceptability of electronic signatures noting that it resembled one which had been faxed or emailed and thus would have been accepted by the Commissioner.

The case subsequently became a technical debate over how the Commonwealth Electoral Act and Electronic Transactions Act were to be interpreted together considering the present context. Perram J disagreed with the Commissioner's interpretation of Section 102(1) of the Commonwealth Electoral Act allowing him the discretion to form an opinion regarding the validity of Ms Trevitt's application. He stated that such freedom was limited to determining whether the claimant was entitled to be enrolled - which she was having fulfilled the criteria of being over 18 years of age and an Australian citizen.

As a result, Perram J ruled that Ms Trevitt's enrolment claim was “in order” due to the fact that the Electronic Transactions Act was applicable to the meaning of Section 102(1)(b) of the Commonwealth Electoral Act and therefore a digital signature fulfilled the necessary enrolment requirement. The respondent was ordered to pay the applicant's costs and Ms Trevitt's online claim was added to the electoral roll.

== Implications ==
The Federal Court made its ruling in a context where the Electoral Commissioner was already accepting signatures in forms (such as facsimile, JPEG image) that were susceptible to a degree of manipulation. Perram J's decision offers no reflection on the reliability or appropriateness of using electronic signatures; it merely discounts any form of discrimination in favour of non-electronic signature methods thus enforcing the concept of ‘technology neutrality’ as a key principle of the Electronic Transactions Act. As such, the success of this test case sets a precedent for future matters relating to the legitimate use of digital signatures as a means of identity verification - an issue likely to become more prevalent as dependence on technology continues to escalate. The outcome of the case does not however consider issues such as security and fraud detection which need to be addressed before the use of electronic signatures can be safely used in e-commerce practices.

The result paved the way for a review of the electoral process, and encourages federal and state governments to use the online medium in attempts to capture the estimated 6% of the Australian population who are not enrolled to vote. With an increased number of voters in each election, and the vast majority of them being young people (70% of those not on the electoral roll are aged between 19 and 39,) it was forecast that the Australian political circuit would become more competitive, with policies likely to be more progressive in order to attract their votes.

This case relied heavily on litigation funding from GetUp supporters and was a major success in the realm of public interest lawsuits. Further, the courts have historically played a minimal role in shaping the Australian electoral process. Getup Ltd v Electoral Commissioner (2010) was a breakthrough success as it proved the ability of the Australian community to fuel legal and political debate over issues of public interest. The court's ruling also encourages the public to identify potential areas for change in Australian legislation and challenges the traditional assumptions of the law in a manner that reflects the 21st century and the advancements it offers.
