= It's Time (GetUp! ad) =

Australian campaign

It's Time is a 2011 Australian pro-same-sex marriage ad created and written by Australian Creative Director Simon Duncan-Watt and directed by Stephen McCallum that was produced by Peter Slee and the activist group GetUp!.

== Plot ==
The ad is lensed through the eyes of an unidentified person (Director of Photography Damian Smith) as they spend time with their new lover (Julian Shaw) throughout courtship, and ups and downs of their relationship. At the end when the boyfriend proposes, the camera pans out and it is revealed we were looking through the eyes of a man. The ad ends with the words, "It's time. End marriage discrimination."

== Development ==
The ad was accompanied by a petition which was to be delivered to Australian officials at the ALP National Conference. The aim of the campaign was to change the Marriage Act, which at the time defined marriage as between a man and a woman. IbiTimes noted that "results of the most recent poll about this contentious issue show that while a slim majority of Australians support the concept, nobody rates it very highly as an issue."

The words at the end are the only text in the ad. The music is the Oliver Tank song, Last Night I Heard Everything in Slow Motion.

== Reception ==
The ad has received critical acclaim. The Advocate described the short film as "Possibly the Most Beautiful Ad for Marriage Equality We've Seen".
