= Encounters Festival South Africa =

Annual documentary film festival

Encounters South African International Documentary Festival
- Location: Cape Town, Johannesburg and Pretoria, South Africa
- Founded: 1999; 27 years ago
- Awards received: Best African Feature Documentary, Best International Feature Documentary, Best African Short Documentary
- Film titles: Documentary features and shorts
- Artistic director: Mandisa Zitha
- Language: English
- Website: http://www.encounters.co.za/

Encounters South African International Documentary Festival (Encounters) is the premier documentary festival in Africa and one of the oldest film festivals on the continent. It remains one of only a few on the continent that is solely dedicated to the genre. The festival is organised by the Encounters Training and Development Institute. Since its inception, the festival has advanced the currency of documentaries in the country and region, supporting new productions and giving an African platform to international documentaries.

The 28th edition will take place from 04 to 14 June 2026 in Cape Town, Johannesburg and Pretoria.

== Background ==
The Encounters South African International Documentary Festival first took place in 1999. Its stated objective is to develop the documentary industry in South Africa by increasing production and building an audience for the genre. The festival supports local and African documentary films and filmmakers and aims to promote them to an international market.

Encounters takes place annually in both Cape Town and Johannesburg during the month of June. The venues used by the festival in Cape Town are The Labia Cinema, V&A Ster Kinekor, Bertha House Mowbray and The Bertha Movie House Isivivana Community Centre (Khayelitsha). In Johannesburg, the festival is hosted at The Bioscope Independent Cinema and The Zone @ Rosebank. In 2025, the festival included screenings in Durban and in 2026, the festival included screenings in Pretoria.

As a non-profit, the Encounters Training and Development Institute also organises training and workshops for filmmakers. This includes the Close Encounters Laboratory, a training programme that has produced 48 films from over 700 participants.

== Annual events ==
Every year the festival hosts and incorporates a number of events above and beyond the film screenings themselves.

After world premieres (usually of South African films) and screenings of international guests' films, question and answer sessions open to the public often take place. Master classes are conducted by local and international guests — producers, writers, commissioning editors, sales agents and distributors, addressing a wide range of topics; anything from industry trends to effective marketing and crowd funding. Similarly, but more specifically targeted towards government arts & culture departments and institutes, are the Industry Presentations on offer. The festival also aims to help and advise small production companies on best practice through the "Producers Workshop".

To broaden the base of the documentary audience, Encounters offers cinema tickets and free entrance to Industry programmes to students and young professionals from disadvantaged backgrounds.

== Audience awards ==
Encounters implements' an annual Audience Award for Best South African and Best International films. Decided by popular vote, all films are eligible for these honours. By 2013, funding permitted, the Festival will implement a Jury Award with prize money in both categories. Not all films will be included ‘in competition’.

=== South African Audience Winners ===
Year	Films	Director	Country
2008	Shamiela's House	Robyn Rourke	South Africa
2009	"Fokofpolisiekar, Forgive them for they know not what they do".	Bryan Little	South Africa
2010	"The 16th Man".	Cliff Bestall	South Africa
2011	"Imam and I".	Khalid Shamis	South Africa
2012	"The African Cypher".	Bryan Little	South Africa
2014	Unearthed	Jolynn Minnaar	South Africa
2015	The Shorebreak	Ryley Grunenwald	South Africa
2016	Action Kommandante: The Untold Story of the Revolutionary Freedom Fighter	Nadine Cloete	South Africa
2017	Strike A Rock	Aliki Saragas	South Africa
2018	The Fun's Not Over: The James Phillips Story & Not In My Neighbourhoods	Michael Cross	South Africa
2019	STROOP - Journey into the Rhino Horn War	Susan Scott	South Africa

=== International Audience Winners ===
Year	Film	Director	Country
2008	Angels in the Dust	Louise Hogarth	USA
2009	RiP!: A Remix Manifesto	Brett Gaylor	Canada
2010	"Of Heart and Courage: Béjart Ballet Lausanne".	Arantxa Aguirre	Spain
2011	Inside Job	Charles H. Ferguson	USA
2012	"Under African Skies. Director: Joe Berlinger".	Paul Simon	USA
2015	Virunga	Orlando von Einsiedel	USA
2016	Maya Angelou: And Still I Rise	Rita Coburn Whack at IMDb & Bob Hercules at IMDb	USA
2017	The Eagle Huntress	Otto Bell	UK
2018	Life is Wonderful: Mandela’s Unsung Heroes	Nick Stadlen	UK
2019	Silence Of Others	Almudena Carracedo and Robert Bahar	USA

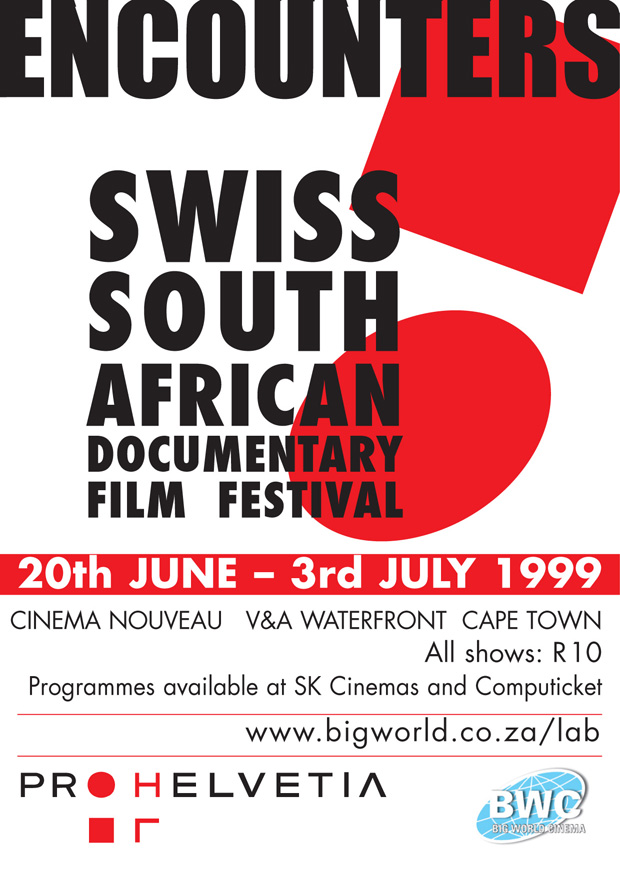
Encounters poster 1999

== Continental and international profile ==
Over the years Encounters has collaborated and partnered with international festivals, markets, commissioning editors and sales agents. The festival hosts programmers from international festivals and has forged relationships with foreign correspondents who report on the Festival for their papers (for example, The Guardian). Most major documentary festivals, in selecting African content, also programme from Encounters. Partnerships and collaborations include:

=== Canada and United States ===
- "Films Transit International. Since 1982". FilmsTransit, Canada.
- "African Film Festival New York". New York Africa Film Festival.
- SilverDocs, USA
- "The Film Sales Company". Film Sales Company, USA.

=== China ===
- "Sichuan TV Festival. Founded in 1991, the biennial Sichuan TV Festival". Sichuan TV Festival, China. Archived from the original on 20 October 2012.

=== Europe ===
- "Afrika Filmfestival 2024 19 - 30 april". Afrika Film Festival Brussels, Belgium.
- "DOC Leipzig. International Leipzig Festival for Documentary and Animated Film 28 October to 3 November 2024" (in German). Leipzig Documentary Festival, Germany. 3 July 2024.
- Berlinale DW-AKADEMIE
- "One world 48 cities". Brussels African Film Festival. One World International Film Festival, Czech Republic
- "Welcome to arte.tv!". Arte distribution, France.
- "Cat & Docs World sales of relevant, innovative, topical and director driven documentaries". Cat & Docs, France.
- "Documentaries are your business". MIPDOC-Trailblazer Award, Cannes. Archived from the original on 15 August 2000.
- Thessaloniki Documentary Festival, Greece
- "Movies that matter. Agenda". Movies that Matter Festival, Netherlands.
- "Cinema Africa. Nyheter". CinemaAfrika, Sweden.
- Visions du Reel, Switzerland
- "First Hand Films must make people laugh, cry, fall in love and learn something". First Hand Films, Switzerland.
- "I'm fine. Thanks for asking. Explore Film". Birds Eye View Festival, UK.

=== Qatar ===
- Al Jazeera

== Filmmakers ==
1999: Alexander J. Seiler, Richard Dindo, Thomas Imbach, Harriet Gavshon, Liz Fish, Cliff Bestall, Nicolaas Hofmeyer, Liza Key, Craig Matthew & Joëlle Chesselet.

2000: Niek Koppen, Hillie Molenaar, Patricia Plattner, Paul Watson, Lauren Groenewald, Lindy Wilson.

2001: Werner Schweizer, Jan Heijs, Darcus Howe, Cliff Bestall, Craig & Damon Foster, Margo Fleiser, Claude Wittwenn, Ebrahim Hajee, Pule Diphare, Cathy Winter, Eddie Edwards, Nokuthula Mazibuko, Rob de Mezieres, Teboho Mahlatsi, Ingrid Gavshon, Rehad Desai, Luiz DeBarros, Craig Matthew & Joëlle Chesselet, Jack Lewis, Sharon Cort, John W Fredericks & Davide Tosco.

2002: Christian Frei, Hetty Naaijekns-Retel Helmrich, Vikram Jayanti, Cliff Bestall & Pearlie Joubert, Rehad Desai, Francois Verster, Tracey Collis, Penny Gaines, Andy Spitz, Eddie Edwards, Mpumi Njinge, Portia Rankoane, Beverley Palesa Ditsie & Nicky Newman, Ernie Vosloo, Jahmil XT Qubeka, Miki Redlinghuys, Gairoonisa Paleker, Renee Rosen, Xoliswa Sithole, Catherine Muller, Ouida Smit & Madoda Ncayiyana, Bearthur Baker, Dumisani Phakathi..

2003: Archie Baron, Paul de Bont, Sam Pollard, Viacheslav Telnov, Peter Wintonick, Craig Foster & Damon Foster, Carina Rubin, Pule Diphare, François Verster, Toni Strasburg, Aryan Kaganof, Ntombi Mzamane, John Fredericks, Vaughan Giose, Brenda Davis, Eugene Paramoer, Clifford Bestall, Emily McKay, Tamsyn Reynolds, Tamara Rothbart, Gerald Kraak, Mark Kaplan, Johnathan de Vries, Kali van der Merwe.

2004: Akiedah Mohamed, Andrea Spitz, Beverley Mitchell, Brian Tilley, Charles Najman, Cliff Bestall, Gillian Schutte, Jack Lewis, Jane Kennedy, Jihan El-Tahri, Karin Slater, Kethiwe Ngcobo, Khalo Matabane, Lauren Groenewald, Laurence Dworkin, Marijke Jongbloed, Martina della Togna, Minky Schlesinger, Omelga Mthiyane, Onyekachi Wambu, Peter Liechti, Riaan Hendricks, Rudzani Dzuguda, Shedreck Mapasa, Shelley Barry, Sipho Singiswa, Sunny Bergman, Teboho Edkins, Vaughan Giose, Zulfah Otto-Sallies

2005: Beverley Palesa Ditsie, Toni Strasburg, Ngaire Blankenberg, Zackie Achmat, Ditsi Carolino, Odette Geldenhuys, Rudzani Dzuguda, Isa-Lee Jacobsen, François Kohler, Bonganjalo Marala, Kim Longinotto, Omelga Hlengiwe Mthiyane, Beverley Mitchell, Leonard Retel Helmrich, Madoda Ncayiyana, Yeppe Rønde, Jemima Spring.

2006: Rehad Desai, Fumane Diseko, John W. Fredericks, Claude Haffner, Wendy Hardie, Susan Levine, Asivhanzhi Mathaba, Vincent Moloi, Omelga Mthiyane, Michael Raimondo, Portia Rankoane, Gillian Schutte-Singiswa, Sipho Singiswa, Karin Slater, Francois Verster, Nokuthula Dhladhla, Zanele Muholi, Salim Amin, Anna Bucchetti, Erik Gandini Gitmo, Jean-Pierre Krief, William Nessen, Tarek Saleh Gitmo, Sky Sitney, Bernard Surugue, Jean-Marie Teno.

2007: Cliff Bestall, Belinda Blignaut & Bridget Pickering Imbokodo, Ditsi Carolino, Nikki Comninos, Tamsen de Beer, Jihan El-Tahri, Angèle Diabang Brener, Sharon Farr, Liz Fish, Simon Klose, Karabo Lediga & Tamsin Andersson, Jack Lewis, Vincent Moloi, Premilla Murcott, Tebogo Ngoma, Eva Mulvad, Lindiwe Nkutha, Miki Redelinghuys, Leonard Retel Helmrich, Lomin Saayman & Lloyd Ross, Julian Shaw, Dylan Valley, Thomas Wallner, Carla Garapedian, Yunus Vally.

2008: Liza Aziz, Tony Bensusan, Sunny Bergman, Lucilla Blankenberg, Lederle Bosch, Don Edkins, Liz Fish, André Cronje & Carlos Francisco, Rehad Desai & Anita Khanna, Bertram Fredericks, Jeanette Jagger, Mali Kambandu, Tamarin Kaplan, Liza Key, Sifiso Khanyile, Kekeletso Khena, Joanne Levitan, Jane Lipman, Thapelo Maleka, Cyrille Maso, Dorothy Meck-Chimbuya, Nami Mhlongo, Steve Kwena Mokwena, Themba Monare, Villant Virginia Ndasowa, Stanley Nelson, Rob Nicholls, Makela Pululu, Robyn Rorke, Karin Slater, Shaun Tomson, Catherine Winter.

2009: Emma Bestall, Angèle Diabang Brener, Nadine Angel Cloete, Liz Fish, Katrin Hansing, Freddy Ilanga, Riaan Hendricks, Jabulani Tsambo, Mark J. Kaplan, William Karel, Liza Key, Brian Little, Ntokozo Mahlalela, Zola Maseko, Dawn Matthews, Thabo Bruno Mokoena, Nhlanhla Mthethwa, Velcrow Ripper, Yoav Shamir, Lisa Swart, Francois Verster, Lindy Wilson.

2010: Cliff Bestall, Dylan Valley, Rina Jooste, Rehad Desai, Helena Kingwill, Tamandani Kapisa, Palesa Shongwe, Masechaba Mogane, Nami Mhlongo, Khanysile Maimela, Michael Raimondo, David Forbes, Lucilla Blankenberg, Steve Kwena Mokwena, Lesedi Mogoatlhe, Makela Yulele Pululu, Odette Geldenhuys, Stefanie Brockhaus & Andy Wolff, Mike Bardsley & Ayla Hilli, Denis Delstrac, Yoruba Richens, Daniel Yon, Omelga Mthiyane, Riaan Henricks, Jo Menell, Adrian Loveland.

2011: Göran Olsson, Jacques de Villiers, Julian Shaw, David Sieveking, Simon Wood, Tanswell Jansen, Ségolène Hanotaux, Lauren Beukes, Brian Tilley & Laurence Dworkin, Khalid Shamis, Karin Slater, Tim Wege, Omelga Mthiyane, Ángela Ramirez, Sara Gouveia, Calum McNaughton, Eric Miyeni, Navan Chetty, Eddie Edwards, Matthew Kalil, Tiny Laubscher, Chris Schutte, Kyle O’Donoghue, Wellbodi Biznes, Miki Redelinghuys, Kagiso Sesoko, Simon Bright, Shelley Barry.

2012: Bryan Little, James Walsh & Katherine Millar, Kurt & Crystal Orderson, Cliff Bestall, William Nessen, Riaan Hendricks, Mitzi Goldman & Andrea Durbach, Dylan Mohan Gray, Tsholofelo Monare, Thomas Barry, Jon Blair, Mandisa Madikane, Erez & Miri Laufer, Isy India Geronimo, Felix Seuffert, Simon Taylor, Wiseman Mabusela, Michael Cross, Richard Slater-Jones, Izette Mostert, Tamsyn Reynolds, Dowelani Nenzhelele, Sarah Ping Nie.

== See also ==
- Al Jazeera
- SilverDocs
- Thessaloniki Documentary Festival
- Visions du Reel
