= Doc Edge =

New Zealand documentary film festival

- Location: Auckland, Wellington
- Established: 2005
- Directors: Alex Lee; Dan Shanan
- Producers: Hunter Weekes
- Website: https://docedge.nz/

The Doc Edge (formerly DOCNZ International Documentary Film Festival) is an Academy Award-qualifying documentary film festival and industry platform based in New Zealand, held annually in Auckland and Wellington. Established in 2005, the festival presents a curated programme of international and New Zealand documentary films and hosts a range of industry initiatives including forums, pitch markets, and immersive storytelling exhibitions.

Doc Edge is organised by the Documentary New Zealand Trust and operates under the motto Life Unscripted. It is recognised for its role in supporting documentary filmmakers and contributing to the development of the documentary sector in New Zealand and the Asia-Pacific region.

== Description ==
Doc Edge is held annually, from April to June, in Auckland and Wellington. The festival is run by the Documentary New Zealand Trust under the motto Life Unscripted.

It showcases documentary films from New Zealand and around the world, and includes awards, Q&A sessions with filmmakers, and other events.

== History ==
Doc Edge was established in 2005 in Auckland as the DOCNZ International Documentary Film Festival by Dan Shanan and Alex Lee. The inaugural edition featured a local competition, and an international competition section was introduced the following year. In 2006, the festival expanded its activities to include an industry programme, which later developed into the Doc Edge Forum.

The festival was rebranded as the Documentary Edge Festival in 2010, and has been known as Doc Edge since around 2016. In 2016, Doc Edge became Academy Award-qualifying for the Short Documentary Subject category, and in 2018 it received additional qualification for the Feature Documentary category.

Doc Edge has received support through New Zealand government cultural initiatives, including funding from the Ministry of Business, Innovation and Employment (MBIE) to support the development and sustainability of arts and cultural organisations.

Over time, the festival has developed a reputation for screening documentary works that engage with contested political, social, and human rights issues, and for maintaining independent curatorial decision-making in its programming. In 2016, the festival publicly advocated for Iranian documentary filmmaker Rokhsareh Ghaemmaghami after she was unable to travel to New Zealand to present her film and participate in festival activities because of visa issues. This position has been reflected in later editions of the festival through the programming of films such as Jihad Rehab, Food Delivery, and In the Shadow of Beirut, which address politically and socially sensitive subject matter.

Traditionally held in cinemas in Auckland and Wellington, the festival adapted during the COVID-19 pandemic in 2020 by introducing a video-on-demand platform. Subsequent editions have combined in-cinema screenings with digital presentations and expanded industry and immersive storytelling initiatives.

In 2024, Doc Edge marked its 20th anniversary, including a significant expansion of its programme in Christchurch, where the festival featured a large number of premieres and strong audience attendance.

According to industry coverage, films screened at Doc Edge have included works that later received major international recognition, including Academy Award and BAFTA-winning titles such asBlood of Yingzhou District, Freeheld, American Factory, All That Breathes, Writing with Fire and Mr.. Nobody vs Putin..

== Programming and curatorial approach ==
Doc Edge presents a curated programme of international and New Zealand documentary films, including premieres and regional debuts. The festival states that it operates with independent curatorial decision-making, with programming determined by its selection team rather than external partners or sponsors.

== Awards and recognition ==
Doc Edge presents awards across multiple categories for international and New Zealand documentary films. Awards are presented across a range of categories recognising directing, editing, cinematography, and emerging talent, as well as jury and audience awards.

The festival became Academy Award-qualifying for the Short Documentary Subject category in 2016 and for the Feature Documentary category in 2018,enabling selected award-winning films to be eligible for consideration for the Academy Awards.

It is among a small number of documentary-focused festivals globally to hold qualifying status across both short and feature documentary formats, alongside It's All True – International Documentary Film Festival in Brazil.

Films screened at the festival have included works that have subsequently received major international recognition, including Academy Award and BAFTA-winning documentaries including Blood of Yingzhou District, Freeheld, American Factory, All That Breathes, Writing with Fire and Mr.. Nobody vs Putin.

The Documentary Edge Festival celebrates the best of documentary films by awarding artists in the following categories:

International selection

- Best International Feature Documentary + Jury Special Mention
- Best International Short Documentary + Jury Special Mention
- Best International Director + Jury Special Mention
- Best Sound
- Best Cinematography
- Best Editing

New Zealand selection

- Best Feature Documentary + Jury Special Mention
- Best Short Documentary
- Best Director
- Best Emerging Filmmaker
- Best Sound
- Best Cinematography
- Best Editing

NZ Student Awards

- Best Tertiary Film + Special Mention
- Best Secondary Film + Special Mention

XR Impact Awards

- Best International XR Impact
- Best New Zealand XR Impact

== Impact ==
Doc Edge has contributed to the development of the documentary filmmaking sector in New Zealand by providing a platform for exhibition, industry engagement, and professional development. Doc Edge is working across the globe and in particular it is the Asia-Pacific documentary home.

It is working to establish and launch Doc Edge Singapore with the intent that this forms one of many satellite events in the region.

== Industry ==
Doc Edge operates as an industry platform for documentary filmmaking through a range of professional initiatives, including the Doc Edge Forum and Doc Edge Pitch.

The Doc Edge Forum includes panel discussions, masterclasses, and keynote presentations involving local and international filmmakers, producers, and industry practitioners. The Doc Edge Pitch provides a marketplace for documentary projects in development, connecting filmmakers with potential partners, funders, and distributors.

Through these initiatives, the festival facilitates professional development and international collaboration within the documentary sector in New Zealand and the Asia-Pacific region.

== XR Exhibition ==
Doc Edge has worked in XR storytelling since the start of last decade. It presents an immersive storytelling exhibition featuring virtual reality (VR), augmented reality (AR), and extended reality (XR) works as part of its annual programme.

The exhibition showcases non-fiction immersive projects from New Zealand and internationally, reflecting developments in documentary storytelling beyond traditional screen formats.

The XR exhibition has been presented in dedicated physical installations and as part of hybrid festival formats, contributing to the festival’s expansion into interactive and experiential media.
