= Julian Shaw =

New Zealand author and actor (born 1985)

→

Julian Shaw (born 16 December 1985 in Wellington, New Zealand) is an actor and filmmaker best known for directing the 2007 film Darling! The Pieter-Dirk Uys Story, a British Film Institute award-winning documentary about the life of South African political satirist Pieter-Dirk Uys. Shaw is the creator of several short films including Clearing the Air. He directed the 2011 feature documentary Cup of Dreams, about New Zealand's national Rugby Union team the All Blacks. Shaw also starred in an Australian marriage equality advertisement entitled It's Time (2011).

== International awards ==
- Young Australian Filmmaker of the Year Award, 2010 - Byron Bay International Film Festival and Sydney International Film School
- Inaugural Derek Oyston/Che Award - British Film Institute's London Lesbian and Gay Film Festival, 2009
- Runner-Up: Panorama Audience Award, for Darling! The Pieter-Dirk Uys Story - Berlin International Film Festival, 2008
- Independent Spirit Award - Inside Film Awards, 2007
- Best Emerging Filmmaker Award - DOCNZ, 2007
- Best Documentary for Darling! The Pieter-Dirk Uys Story - Documentary Edge Festival, 2007

== Filmography ==
=== Actor ===
- Stoner, San Andreas (film), 2015
- "It's Time", GetUp! Australia ad for marriage equality, 2011
- Christopher, episode "Love Gone Wrong," Deadly Women
- Looking for Dr Love, 2024

=== Director ===
- Cup of Dreams, 2011
- Clearing the Air, 2010
- Darling! The Pieter-Dirk Uys Story, 2007

=== Writer, Actor, and Director ===
- All Blacks Don't Cry, 2010 (portrayed the young John Kirwan)
