= Documentary New Zealand Trust =

Documentary Edge
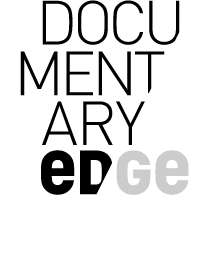
- Location: Auckland and Wellington, New Zealand
- Founded: 2004
- Website: docedge.nz

Set up in 2004, The Documentary New Zealand Trust is a non-profit organisation promoting documentary filmmaking and advocating opportunities for New Zealand documentary filmmakers. Its signature events are an international film festival, DOC Pitch and DOC Lab. It engages with the government, funding agencies, creative organisations, academic institutions and other screen industry guilds to ensure maximum support and funding for documentary filmmakers in New Zealand.

== The Organisation ==
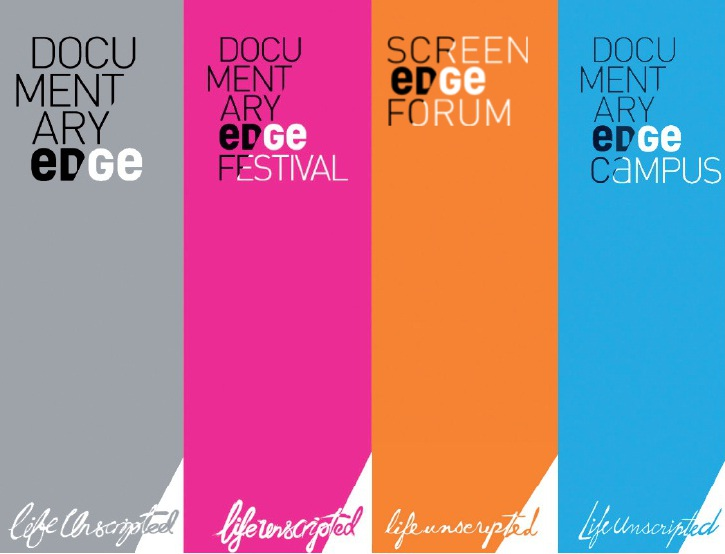
Documentary Edge Activities

=== The Trustees ===
- Alex Lee
- Dan Shanan

== Doc Edge Festival and Awards ==
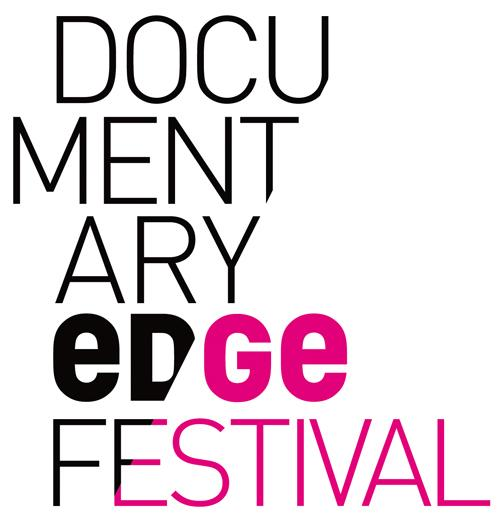
Documentary Edge Festival Logo

The DOCNZ International Documentary Film Festival was launched in 2005 in Auckland by the then Prime Minister, Helen Clark. It was rebranded as Documentary Edge Festival in 2010, then Doc Edge, and is held annually in Auckland and Wellington.

The Documentary Edge Awards are awarded at the festival.

== The Screen Edge Forum ==
Screen Edge Forum Logo

The Screen Edge Forum (previously known as DOCNZ Summit and Documentary Edge Forum) is an annual pan-screen industry event covering documentary, transmedia and other screen industry topics.

Many Pitch Projects have been developed as a result including:

- The Relocated Mountain, Julia Parnell
- The Topp Twins, Arani Cuthbert
- Lost in Wonderland, Zoe McIntosh
- There Once was an Island: Te Henua E Noho, Briar March
- Brother Number One, Annie Goldson
- Pictures of Susan, Dan Salmon
- Strawberries with the Führer, Amy O'Connor
- Batons & Baquettes, Campbell Cooley
- Stumbling into the Wall, Tony Foster
- 4:20 New Zealand, Arik Reiss
- Te Hono Ki Aotearoa - The Waka for Europe, Jan Bieringa
- Running for his Life, Anna Cottrell
- Varayame's Feet, Sarah Graham Read
- Wrestling Spectacular - A Kiwi Century on the Mat, Adam Simpson

== DOC Lab ==
DOC Lab is a three-day incubator to educate, inspire and develop filmmakers with a shared goal of developing documentaries and exploring multi-platforms for creation and delivery. Local and international experts are brought in as mentors to help the selected projects and teams.

The mentors will present their practice areas and speak on the developments and technologies that will help the selected teams in realizing their projects. They will also work with teams individually and provide feedback, suggestions and development strategies.

Starting from content ideas or from existing material, DOC Lab will discuss new documentary prototypes that use one or more new media. Workshop topics include:

- storytelling including new and different forms of platforms and storytelling devices
- collaboration across platforms and genres
- how to engage with the community and the role(s) of the audience
- interactive and data-based stories
- the use of computer games for documentary purposes
- funding and commissioning of all media documentaries
- new forms of distribution and delivery

Many Projects have been developed as a result including:

- Brother Number One, Annie Goldson
- Finding Mercy, Roby Paterson
- PIYN, Gareth Farry, Peter Takapuna
- Ringcon, Prue Langbein
- Strawberries with the Führer, Amy O'Connor

== Documentary Edge Campus ==
Documentary Edge Campus is New Zealand's first resource centre for documentary films and materials. It is available to the wider community for free.

It includes:

- A film library with over 200 titles, books, magazines, and other literature
- 4 viewing stations
- A drop-in centre available for meetings and workshops
- Open all year round (excluding weekends and public holidays)
