= Female Eye Film Festival =

Film festival screening works by women directors in Toronto

- Location: Toronto, Canada
- Established: 2001
- Website: thefemaleeyefilmfestival.com

The Female Eye Film Festival (FeFF) is a competitive international film festival established in 2001. It is Toronto’s only international film festival geared specifically for women directors. The 2025 Female Eye Film Festival will take place from October 14 through October 19, 2025.

Events:

- Films will play at the TIFF Lightbox between October 15 - October 19, 2025.
- Experimental films and a photo gallery on the theme of "Resilience" will present at the Women's Art Association of Canada on October 14.
- Script readings will be open to the public at the Women's Art Association of Canada on October 14 - October 16.
- Films will play in Vaughan (location TBD) on October 17.

== History ==
In 2001, Female Eye Film Festival was established and incorporated as a provincial not-for-profit organization in Toronto, Canada by founder and artistic director Leslie-Ann Coles, after she observed that women directors were a minority among filmmakers at the international film festivals she attended with her debut film, In The Refrigerator. Coles originally selected for FeFF the tagline, "FeFF flicks, not just for chicks", to underline that women-made films are not necessarily just for women. In 2005, the tagline "Always Honest, Not Always Pretty" was coined, when Coles was asked to describe the festival offering. The inaugural festival took place a year later, at which 42 films were screened, mostly by local directors. Between 2002 and 2004, the festival began introducing programs to promote filmmaking by and about women, including the Script Development Program and the December 6 Program, in memory of the Montreal Massacre, featuring films that pertain to global issues of violence against women.

In 2005, the festival became competitive, presenting awards for several categories of best film and best screenplay. Later, a photo exhibition and Experimental Film Program were also introduced, as well as opening and closing galas. As part of its outreach efforts, FeFF curates programs, especially of Canadian women filmmakers, for various international festivals, such as KIN International Women's Film Festival in Yerevan, Armenia, Flying Broom International Women's Film Festival in Ankara, Turkey, and Doctober, a month long festival in Bellingham, Washington (US).

The festival has grown into a known international event: In the first year, 42 films were screened from 100 submissions, 70 percent local. In 2016, there were more than 500 submissions, and more than 90 films screened over 6 days, from all around the world.

FeFF is accredited by the Canadian Academy of Film and Television. It has been voted as one of the "top 50 film festivals in the world worthy the entry fee" by the independent Movie Maker magazine six times (2013–2018).

== Programs ==
- Script Development Program: Open to both men and women, but the script must include a woman protagonist. It is a 3-tiered program, which includes:
  - Good To Go: pitch session for screenwriters with scripts that are good to go
  - Script Reading Series: ACTRA members read main scenes from scripts selected
  - Script reading in front of a live audience including industry delegates who provide feedback to the writers
- Young Filmmaker Development Workshop
- December 6 Program
- Experimental Film Program
- The Aboriginal Filmmaker Program

== Awards ==
Award winners are presented with a hand-crafted engraved statuette. Awards presented include:

Film awards

- Best of Show
- Best Foreign Feature
- Best Canadian Feature
- Best Documentary
- Best Short Documentary
- Best Debut Filmmaker
- Best Short Film
- Best Animation
- Best Experimental Film

Screenplay awards

- Best Screenplay
- Best Reserve
- Best Low-Budget Feature
- Best Fresh Voice
- Audience Choice

Other

- Winner of the Live Pitch wins a $2500 cash prize

== See also ==
- List of women's film festivals
