= Abu al-Abbas =

Abū al-ʿAbbās (أبو العبّاس) is an Arabic name. It translates to "father of Abbas," in reference to Abd al-Muttalib- grandfather of the Islamic prophet Muhammad; and father of Muhammad's uncle and companion Abbas ibn Abd al-Muttalib, scion of the Abbasid dynasty. Notable people named Abu al-Abbas include:

- Abu al-Abbas Abd Allah ibn Muhammad, better known as al-Saffah (died 754), first Abbasid caliph who ruled from 750 to 754
- Abu al-Abbas Abdallah ibn Harun al-Rashid, better known as al-Ma'mun (786–833), Abbasid caliph who ruled from 813 until 833
- Abū al-ʿAbbās Aḥmad ibn Ṭalḥa ibn Jaʿfar, better known as al-Mu'tadid (892–902), Abbasid caliph who ruled from 15 October 892 to 5 April 902.
- Abu al-ʽAbbās Thaʽlab (815–904), Arabic grammarian and founder of the school of Kufa
- Abu al-Abbas Ahmad ibn Muhammad, better known as al-Farghani or Alfraganus (died 870), Abbasid-era astronomer, mathematician, and translator
- Abu al-Abbas Iranshahri, 9th-century Persian polymath
- Abu al-Abbas Ahmad ibn Ja'far, better known as al-Radi (909–940), Abbasid caliph ruling from Baghdad in 934–940
- Abu al-Abbas as-Sabti (1129–1204), Moroccan Sufi wali; one of the "Seven Saints of Marrakesh"
- Abu al-Abbas Aḥmad ibn Ali, better known as Ahmad al-Buni (died 1225), mathematician, esotericist, and philosopher; attributed author of the Shams al-Ma'arif
- Abu al-Abbas al-Azafi (1162–1236), religious and legal scholar who ruled over Ceuta (today a Spanish enclave in Morocco)
- Abu al-Abbas al-Nabati (1166–1239), Andalusian botanist and pharmacist
- Abu al-Abbas al-Mursi (1219–1287), Sufi saint from al-Andalus
  - Abu al-Abbas al-Mursi Mosque, mosque in Alexandria (Egypt)
- Abu al-Abbas Ahmad ibn Abi Ali al-Hasan ibn Abu Bakr, better known as al-Hakim I (c. 1247–1302), thirty-eighth Abbasid caliph; second Abbasid caliph to be seated in Cairo, as a subject of the Mamluk Sultanate
- Abu al-Abbas Ahmad, better known as Ibn Fadlallah al-Umari (1301–1349), Arab historian born in Damascus
- Abu al-Abbas Ahmad II, Hafsid ruler of Ifriqiya (Tunisia) from 1370 to 1394. Notable as the primary Muslim leader defending against the Barbary Crusade
- Abu al-Abbas Ahmad III, Hafsid ruler of Ifriqiya (Tunisia) from 1543 to 1569
- Abu al-Abbas Ahmad al-Mustansir, Marinid Sultan of Morocco from 1374 to 1384
- Abu al-Abbās Ahmad ibn Ali, better known as al-Maqrizi (1364–1442), Egyptian historian
- Abu al-Abbas Ahmad ibn Abi Jum'ah al-Maghrawi al-Wahrani, better known as Ahmad ibn Abi Jum'ah (died 1511), Maliki scholar of Islamic law active in the Maghreb (modern day Algeria and Morocco)
- Abu al-Abbas Aḥmad ibn Muhammad, better known as Ibn Hajar al-Haytami (1503–1566), Egyptian hadith scholar and Islamic theologian
- Abu al-Abbas Ahmad ibn Muhammad, sultan of the Moroccan Wattasid dynasty, ruled 1526–1545 and 1547–1549
- Abu al-Abbas Ahmad al-Mansur, better known as Ahmad al-Mansur or al-Mansur al-Dhahabi (1549–1603), Saadi Sultan of Morocco from 1578 to 1603. Notable for his victory during the Battle of the Three Kings, his trans-Saharan conquests, his constructions throughout Marrakesh, and his patronage of the Zaydani Library.
- Abu al-Abbas Ahmad ibn Ahmad, better known as Ahmad Baba al-Timbukti (1556–1627), Sanhaja Berber writer, Islamic scholar, and political provocateur active in Western Sudan
- Abu al-Abbas Ahmad ibn Muhammad, better known as Ahmad al-Tijani (1735–1815), Algerian Sharif and founder of the Tijaniyyah Sufi order
- Abu al-Abbas Ahmad ibn Mustafa, better known as Ahmad al-Alawi (1869–1934), Algerian Sufi Sheikh and founder of a Sufi order called the Alawiyya
- Abul-Abbas, (c.770s–810), elephant sent as a diplomatic gift to Charlemagne by Abbasid caliph Harun al-Rashid, as part of an embassy which helped develop the Abbasid–Carolingian alliance.
