= Abbas (name) =

ʿAbbās عَبَّاس
- Pronunciation: Arabic: [ʕabˈbaːs]
- Gender: Male
- Language: Arabic

Origin
- Origin: Arabia
- Meaning: Lion

Other names
- See also: Abbes, Abass, Abas, Abbaas, Abassi

ʿAbbās (Arabic: عَبَّاس) is an old Arabic name that means 'Lion'. The name traces back to Abbas ibn Abd al-Muttalib in 536 CE (an uncle of Muhammad) and Abbas ibn Ali, a son of Ali ibn Abi Talib, who participated in the battle of Karbala alongside his brother Husayn ibn Ali. Abbas ibn Ali is revered by Muslims, some of whom are named Abbas in remembrance and tribute to him. There is an Arabian tribe of the same name, the Banu Abbas.

The word Abbas is also used as part of a place name (for example, the English villages of Compton Abbas and Milton Abbas). The name usually relates to land previously owned by an abbess (the head of an abbey of nuns).

Notable people with the name include:

== Historic figures with the name ==
- Abbas ibn Abd al-Muttalib (565–653), uncle of Muhammad and forefather of the Abbasids
- Abbas ibn Ali (647–680), son of Ali ibn Abi Talib, died at the Battle of Karbala in an attempt to bring water for the thirsty children of his brother Husayn.
- Abbas ibn al-Walid (died 750), Umayyad prince and general
- Abbas ibn al-Ma'mun (died 838), Abbasid prince and general
- Abbas ibn Firnas (810–887), Berber physician, inventor, and musician
- Abbas ibn Abi al-Futuh (died 1154), Fatimid vizier
- Abbas ibn Abogn (died 1545), Grand Vizier of the Adal Sultanate
- Abbas the Great (1557–1628), shah of Persia, known as King Abbas the Great
- Abbas II of Persia (1632–1666), shah of Persia 1642–1666
- Abbas III (1732–1740), shah of Persia 1732–1736
- Abbas Mirza (1783–1833), leader of the Persian armies in the wars with Russia 1811–13 and 1826–28.
- Abbas I of Egypt (1813–1854), known as Abbas Pasha, Wāli of Egypt 1848–1854
- Abbás Effendí (`Abdu'l–Bahá) (1844–1921), 2nd head of the Bahá'í Faith
- Abbas II of Egypt (1874–1944), known as Abbas Hilmi, Khedive of Egypt 1892–1914

== Other people known by the mononym ==
- Abbas (actor) (Mirza Abbas Ali, born 1975)
- Abbas (photographer) (Abbas Attar, 1944-2018)

== People with the given name ==
- Abbas Adham (1885–1969), Iranian physician and politician
- Abbas Khan Afridi (1970–2025), Pakistani politician
- Abbas Ali (disambiguation), several people
- Abbas Anvari (1944–2025), Iranian physicist
- Abbas Aram (1906–1985), Iranian diplomat and politician
- Abbas Attar (1944–2018), Iranian photographer, member of Magnum Photos
- Abbas Jirari (1937–2024), Moroccan writer
- Abbas Kaoud (born 1948), Egyptian squash player
- Abbas Karimi (born 1997), Afghan swimmer
- Abbas Kazmi (born 1955), Indian criminal lawyer
- Abbas Khadir (born 1973; German: Abbas Khider), German writer of Iraqi origin
- Abbas Khalili, also known as Abbas al-Khalili (1896–1972), Iraqi-born Iranian diplomat, newspaper publisher
- Abbas Kiarostami (1940–2016), Iranian film director
- Abbas Mahfouzi (1928–2024), Iranian Twelver Shi'a marja'

== People with the surname ==
- Abu Abbas (Muhammad Zaidan, 1948–2004), founder of the Palestine Liberation Front organization
- Ackbar Abbas (born 1947), Hong Kong born professor of comparative literature at the University of California, Irvine
- Ali Asad Abbas (born 1976), United Arab Emirates cricketer
- Ali Ismail Abbas (born 1991), Iraqi juvenile double amputee, a casualty of the United States invasion of Iraq in 2003
- Allan Abbass (born 1962), Canadian professor and psychriatrist
- Amina Abbas (born 1942), First Lady of Palestine
- Athar Abbas (born 1955), Pakistani army general
- Basel Abbas and Ruanne Abou-Rahme, art duo
- Bassim Abbas (born 1982), Iraqi footballer
- Bonfoh Abass (1948–2021), Togolese politician
- Ferhat Abbas (1899–1985), political leader and first (provisional) President of Algeria
- Ghulam Abbas (writer) (1909–1982), Pakistani writer
- Ghulam Abbas (cricketer) (born 1947), Pakistani cricketer
- Hadiya Khalaf Abbas (1958–2021), Syrian politician
- Hiam Abbass (born 1960), Palestinian actress
- Hisham Abbas (born 1963), Egyptian musician
- Hussein Abbass (born 1969), Egyptian artificial intelligence researcher
- Imad Abbas (1975–2004), Palestinian militant
- Imran Abbas (Syed Imran Abbas Naqvi, born 1982), Pakistani actor, model and producer
- Imran Abbas (cricketer) (born 1978), Pakistani cricketer
- Jay Abbass (born 1957), Canadian politician
- Judah ben Abbas, Spanish Jewish writer
- Judah ibn Abbas (died 1163), poet and first Jew known by the name of Abbas
- Khodayyir Abbas, Iraqi government official
- Khwaja Ahmad Abbas (1914–1987), an Indian film director, novelist, screenwriter, and a journalist.
- Mahmoud Abbas (born 1935), Palestinian politician, president of Palestine and the Palestinian National Authority since 2005
- Mansour Abbas (born 1974), Israeli Arab politician
- Muhammad Abbas, the name of several people
- Nadeem Abbasi (born 1968), Pakistani cricketer
- Nabeel Abbas (born 1986), Iraqi footballer
- Nader Sufyan Abbas (born 1975), Bulgarian-Qatari weightlifter
- Nureli Abbas (born 2004), Chinese footballer
- Qaiser Abbas (born 1982), Pakistani cricketer
- Roshan Abbas, Indian television and radio host
- Rushan Abbas (born 1967), Uyghur American activist
- Sam Abbas (born 1993), Egyptian film producer and director
- Sohail Abbas (born 1977), Pakistani field hockey player
- Soltan Abbas (1933–2025), Azerbaijani poet
- Suleiman Al Abbas, Syrian engineer and politician
- Wael Abbas (born 1974), Egyptian human rights activist
- Yavar Abbas (born 1920), British-Indian soldier and filmmaker
- Yunis Khatayer Abbas, Iraqi journalist
- Zaheer Abbas (born 1947), Pakistani cricketer
- Zainab Abbas (born 1988), Pakistani commentator and sports presenter
- Zainab Abbas (activist) (born 1950), Black British activist

== See also ==
- Abbasid dynasty
- Barabbas, to be crucified with Jesus but pardoned
