= Magic (supernatural) =

Practice of supernatural beings and forces

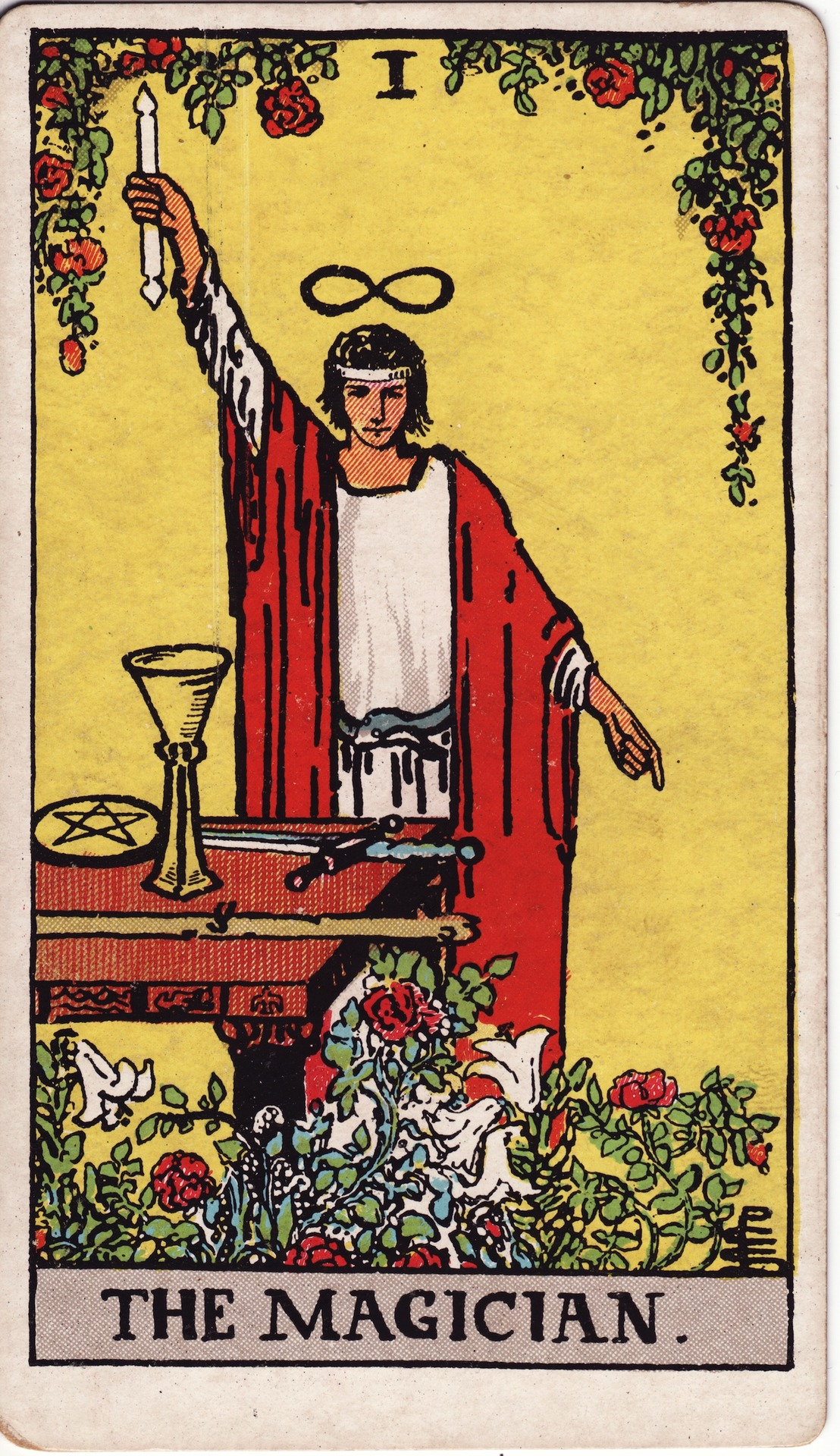
The Magician, an illustration from the Rider–Waite tarot deck first published in 1910

Magic, sometimes spelled magick, is the application of beliefs, rituals or actions employed with the intent to manipulate natural or supernatural beings and forces. It is a category into which various beliefs and practices have been placed, sometimes considered separate from both religion and science. This separation of the terms 'religion' and 'magic' in a functional sense is disputed. It is a postulate of modern anthropology, at least since early 1930s, that there is complete continuity between magic and religion.

Connotations have varied from positive to negative at times throughout history. Within Western culture, magic has been linked to ideas of the Other, foreignness, and primitivism; indicating that it is "a powerful marker of cultural difference" and likewise, a non-modern phenomenon. During the late nineteenth and early twentieth centuries, Western intellectuals perceived the practice of magic to be a sign of a fantasy-prone mentality and also commonly attributed it to marginalised groups of people.

== Etymology ==
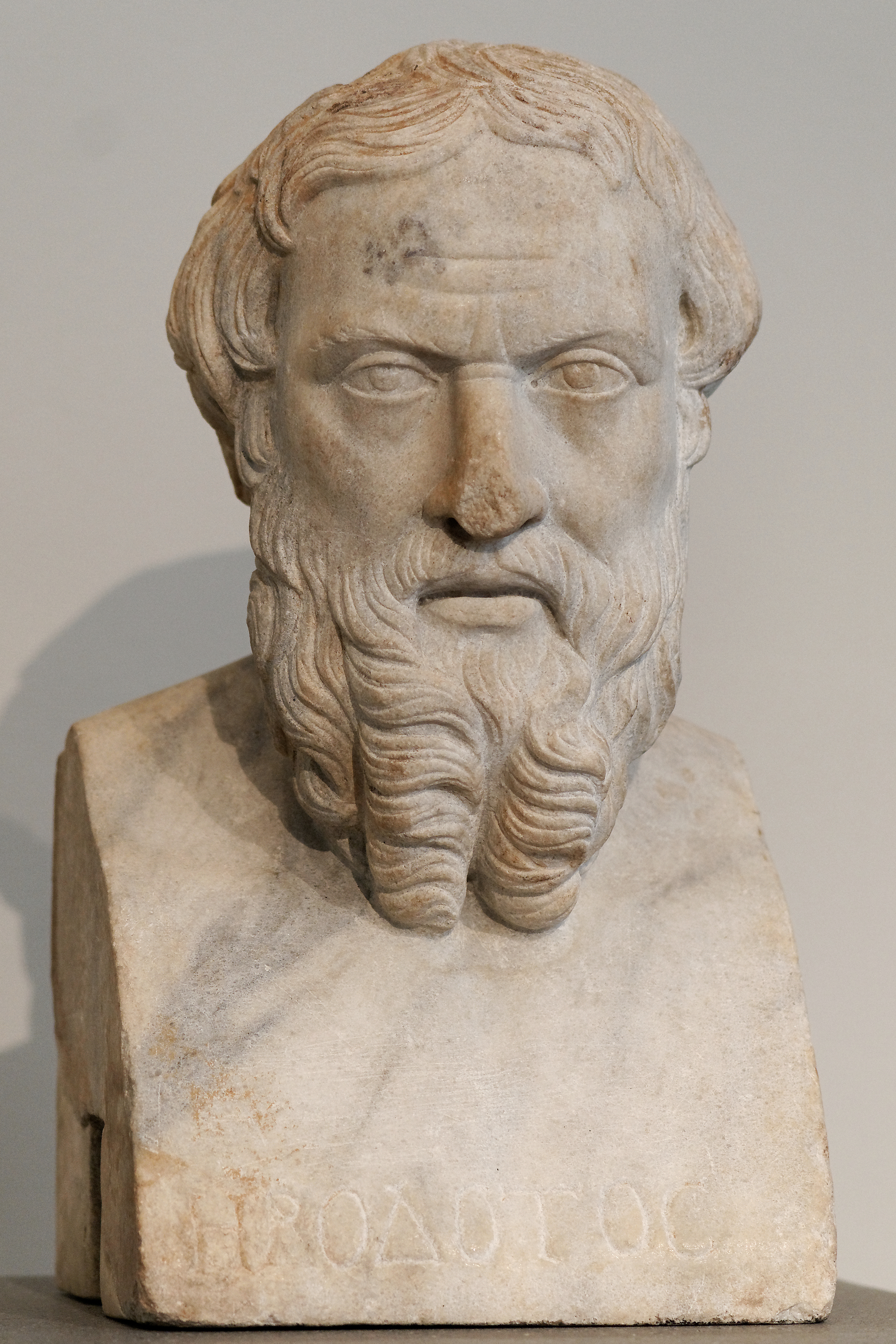
One of the earliest surviving accounts of the Persian mágoi was provided by the Greek historian Herodotus.

The English words magic, mage and magician come from the Latin term magus, through the Greek μάγος, which is from the Old Persian maguš. (𐎶𐎦𐎢𐏁|𐎶𐎦𐎢𐏁, magician). The Old Persian magu- is derived from the Proto-Indo-European megʰ-*magh (be able). The Persian term may have led to the Old Sinitic *M^{γ}ag (mage or shaman). The Old Persian form seems to have permeated ancient Semitic languages as the Jewish Babylonian Aramaic magosh, the Aramaic amgusha (magician), and the Chaldean maghdim (wisdom and philosophy); from the first century BCE onwards, Syrian magusai gained notoriety as magicians and soothsayers.

During the late-sixth and early-fifth centuries BCE, the term goetia found its way into ancient Greek, where it was used with negative connotations to apply to rites that were regarded as fraudulent, unconventional, and dangerous; in particular they dedicate themselves to the evocation and invocation of daimons (lesser divinities or spirits) to control and acquire powers. This concept remained pervasive throughout the Hellenistic period, when Hellenistic authors categorised a diverse range of practices—such as enchantment, witchcraft, incantations, divination, necromancy, and astrology—under the label "magic".

The Latin language adopted this meaning of the term in the first century BCE. Via Latin, the concept became incorporated into Christian theology during the first century CE. Early Christians associated magic with demons, and thus regarded it as against Christian religion. In early modern Europe, Protestants often claimed that Roman Catholicism was magic rather than religion, and as Christian Europeans began colonizing other parts of the world in the sixteenth century, they labelled the non-Christian beliefs they encountered as magical. In that same period, Italian humanists reinterpreted the term in a positive sense to express the idea of natural magic. Both negative and positive understandings of the term recurred in Western culture over the following centuries.

Since the nineteenth century, academics in various disciplines have employed the term magic but have defined it in different ways and used it in reference to different things. One approach, associated with the anthropologists Edward Tylor (1832–1917) and James G. Frazer (1854–1941), uses the term to describe beliefs in hidden sympathies between objects that allow one to influence the other. Defined in this way, magic is portrayed as the opposite to science. An alternative approach, associated with the sociologist Marcel Mauss (1872–1950) and his uncle Émile Durkheim (1858–1917), employs the term to describe private rites and ceremonies and contrasts it with religion, which it defines as a communal and organised activity. By the 1990s many scholars were rejecting the term's utility for scholarship. They argued that the label drew arbitrary lines between similar beliefs and practices that were alternatively considered religious, and that it constituted ethnocentrism to apply the connotations of magic—rooted in Western and Christian history—to other cultures.

== Branches or types ==
=== High and low ===
Historians and anthropologists have distinguished between practitioners who engage in high magic, and those who engage in low magic. High magic, also known as theurgy and ceremonial or ritual magic, is more complex, involving lengthy and detailed rituals as well as sophisticated, sometimes expensive, paraphernalia. Low magic and natural magic are associated with peasants and folklore with simpler rituals such as brief, spoken spells. Low magic is also closely associated with goetia and witchcraft. Anthropologist Susan Greenwood writes that "Since the Renaissance, high magic has been concerned with drawing down forces and energies from heaven" and achieving unity with divinity. High magic is usually performed indoors while witchcraft is often performed outdoors.

=== White, gray and black ===
Historian Owen Davies says the term "white witch" was rarely used before the 20th century. White magic is understood as the use of magic for selfless or helpful purposes, while black magic was used for selfish, harmful or evil purposes. Black magic is the malicious counterpart of the benevolent white magic. There is no consensus as to what constitutes white, gray or black magic, as Phil Hine says, "like many other aspects of occultism, what is termed to be 'black magic' depends very much on who is doing the defining." Gray magic, also called "neutral magic", is magic that is not performed for specifically benevolent reasons, but is also not focused towards completely hostile practices.

==== Witchcraft ====
The historian Ronald Hutton notes the presence of four distinct meanings of the term witchcraft in the English language. Historically, the term primarily referred to the practice of causing harm to others through supernatural or magical means. This remains, according to Hutton, "the most widespread and frequent" understanding of the term. Moreover, Hutton also notes three other definitions in current usage; to refer to anyone who conducts magical acts, for benevolent or malevolent intent; for practitioners of the modern Pagan religion of Wicca; or as a symbol of women resisting male authority and asserting an independent female authority. Belief in witchcraft is often present within societies and groups whose cultural framework includes a magical world view.

Those regarded as being magicians have often faced suspicion from other members of their society. This is particularly the case if these perceived magicians have been associated with social groups already considered morally suspect in a particular society, such as foreigners, women, or the lower classes. In contrast to these negative associations, many practitioners of activities that have been labelled magical have emphasised that their actions are benevolent and beneficial. This conflicted with the common Christian view that all activities categorised as being forms of magic were intrinsically bad regardless of the intent of the magician, because all magical actions relied on the aid of demons. There could be conflicting attitudes regarding the practices of a magician; in European history, authorities often believed that cunning folk and traditional healers were harmful because their practices were regarded as magical and thus stemming from contact with demons, whereas a local community might value and respect these individuals because their skills and services were deemed beneficial.

In Western societies, the practice of magic, especially when harmful, was usually associated with women. For instance, during the witch trials of the early modern period, around three quarters of those executed as witches were female, to only a quarter who were men. That women were more likely to be accused and convicted of witchcraft in this period might have been because their position was more legally vulnerable, with women having little or no legal standing that was independent of their male relatives. The conceptual link between women and magic in Western culture may be because many of the activities regarded as magical—from rites to encourage fertility to potions to induce abortions—were associated with the female sphere. It might also be connected to the fact that many cultures portrayed women as being inferior to men on an intellectual, moral, spiritual, and physical level.

== History ==
=== Mesopotamia ===
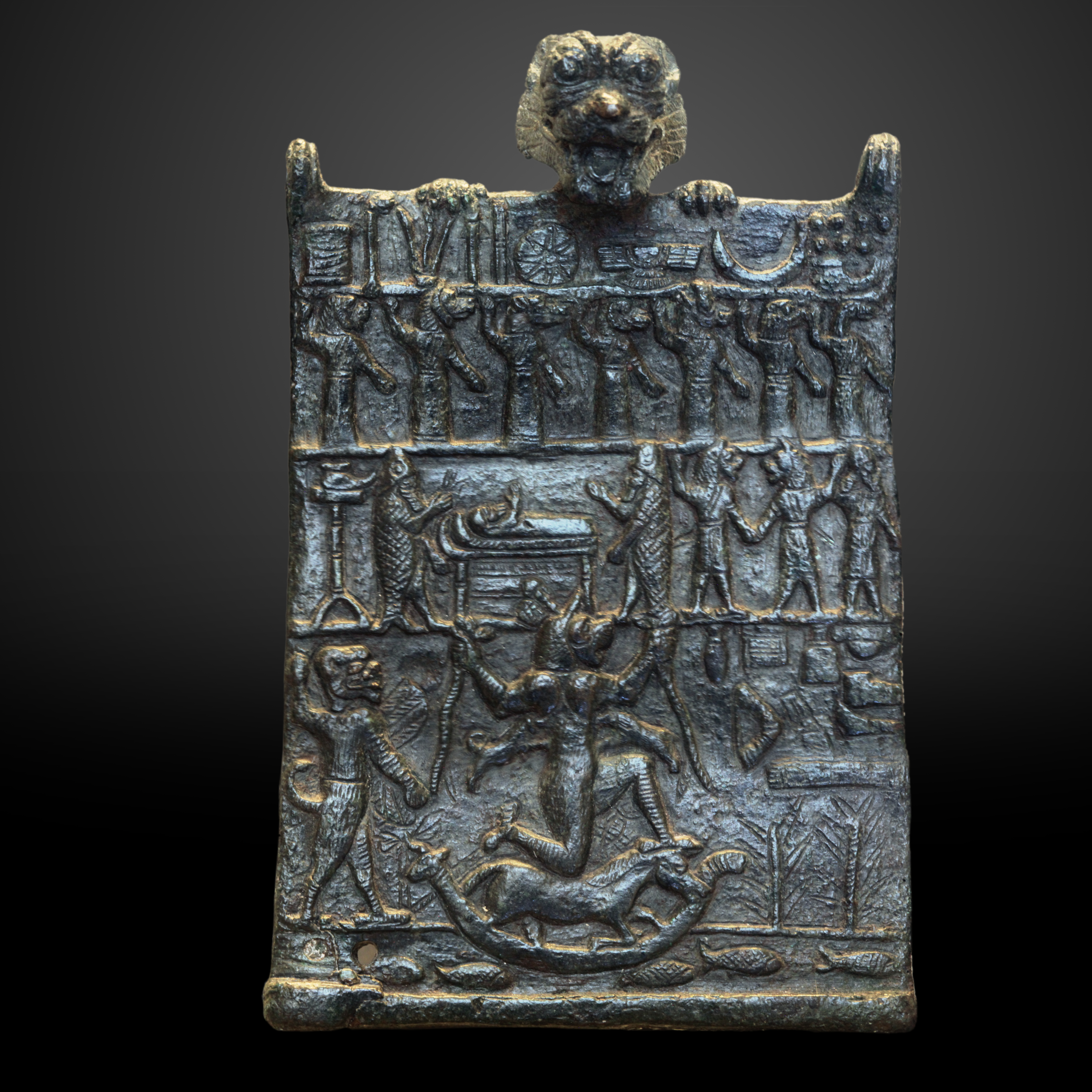
Bronze protection plaque from the Neo-Assyrian era showing the deity Lamashtu

Magic was invoked in many kinds of rituals and medical formulae, and to counteract evil omens. Defensive or legitimate magic in Mesopotamia (asiputu or masmassutu in the Akkadian language) were incantations and ritual practices intended to alter specific realities. The ancient Mesopotamians believed that magic was the only viable defense against demons, ghosts, and evil sorcerers. To defend themselves against the spirits of those they had wronged, they would leave offerings known as kispu in the person's tomb in hope of appeasing them. If that failed, they also sometimes took a figurine of the deceased and buried it in the ground, demanding for the gods to eradicate the spirit, or force it to leave the person alone.

The ancient Mesopotamians also used magic intending to protect themselves from evil sorcerers who might place curses on them. Black magic as a category did not exist in ancient Mesopotamia, and a person legitimately using magic to defend themselves against illegitimate magic would use exactly the same techniques. The only major difference was that curses were enacted in secret; whereas a defense against sorcery was conducted in the open, in front of an audience if possible. One ritual to punish a sorcerer was known as Maqlû, or "The Burning". The person viewed as being afflicted by witchcraft would create an effigy of the sorcerer and put it on trial at night. Then, once the nature of the sorcerer's crimes had been determined, the person would burn the effigy and thereby break the sorcerer's power over them.

The ancient Mesopotamians also performed magical rituals to purify themselves of sins committed unknowingly. One such ritual was known as the Šurpu, or "Burning", in which the caster of the spell would transfer the guilt for all their misdeeds onto various objects such as a strip of dates, an onion, and a tuft of wool. The person would then burn the objects and thereby purify themself of all sins that they might have unknowingly committed. A whole genre of love spells existed. Such spells were believed to cause a person to fall in love with another person, restore love which had faded, or cause a male sexual partner to be able to sustain an erection when he had previously been unable. Other spells were used to reconcile a man with his patron deity or to reconcile a wife with a husband who had been neglecting her.

The ancient Mesopotamians made no distinction between rational science and magic. When a person became ill, doctors would prescribe both magical formulas to be recited as well as medicinal treatments. Most magical rituals were intended to be performed by an āšipu, an expert in the magical arts. The profession was generally passed down from generation to generation and was held in extremely high regard and often served as advisors to kings and great leaders. An āšipu probably served not only as a magician, but also as a physician, a priest, a scribe, and a scholar.

The Sumerian god Enki, who was later syncretized with the East Semitic god Ea, was closely associated with magic and incantations; he was the patron god of the bārȗ and the ašipū and was widely regarded as the ultimate source of all arcane knowledge. The ancient Mesopotamians also believed in omens, which could come when solicited or unsolicited. Regardless of how they came, omens were always taken with the utmost seriousness.

==== Incantation bowls ====
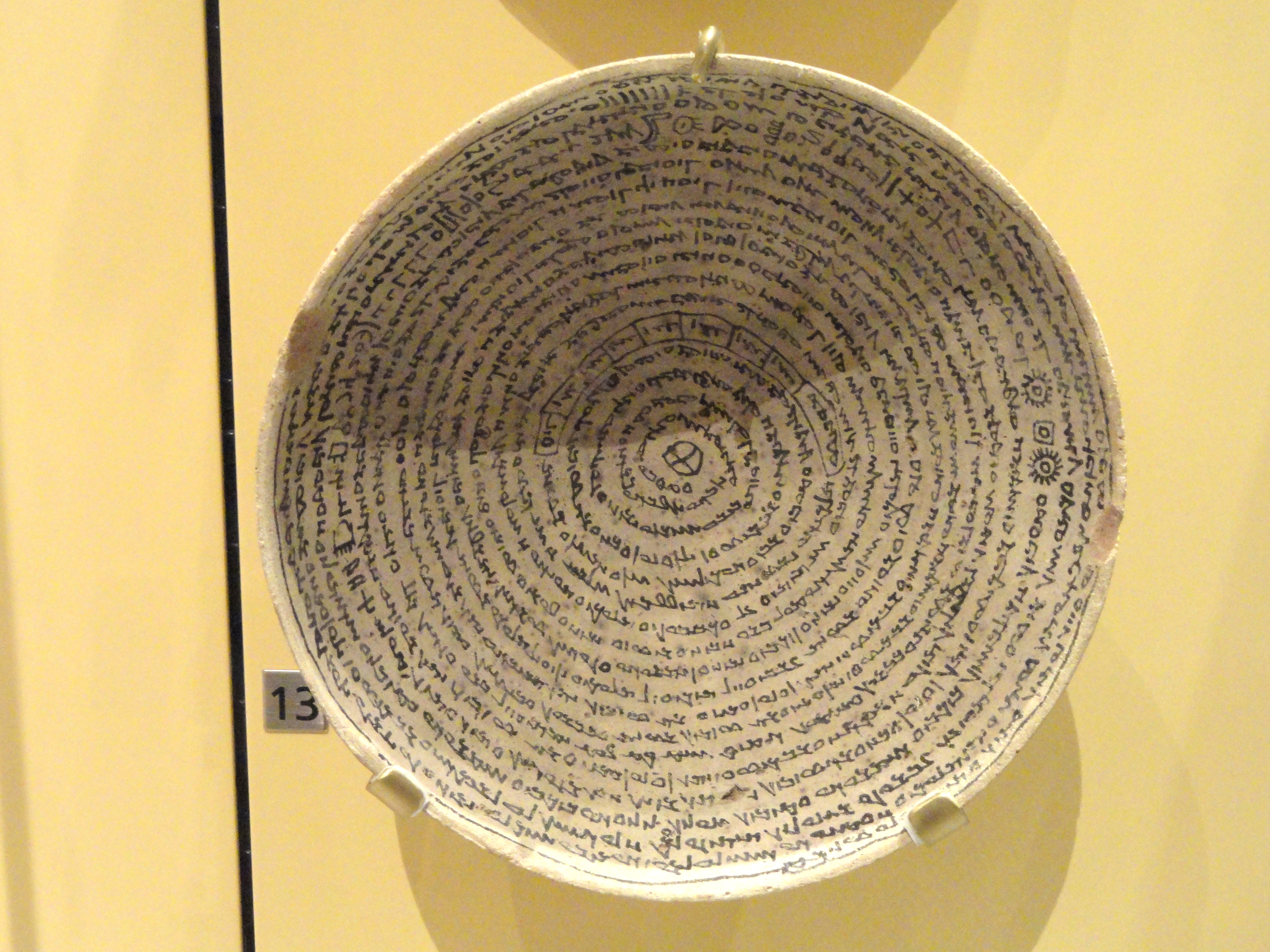
Mandaic-language incantation bowl

A common set of shared assumptions about the causes of evil and how to avert it are found in a form of early protective magic called incantation bowl or magic bowls. The bowls were produced in the Middle East, particularly in Upper Mesopotamia and Syria, what is now Iraq and Iran, and fairly popular during the sixth to eighth centuries. The bowls were buried face down and were meant to capture demons. They were commonly placed under the threshold, courtyards, in the corner of the homes of the recently deceased and in cemeteries. A subcategory of incantation bowls are those used in Jewish magical practice. Aramaic incantation bowls are an important source of knowledge about Jewish magical practices.

=== Egypt ===
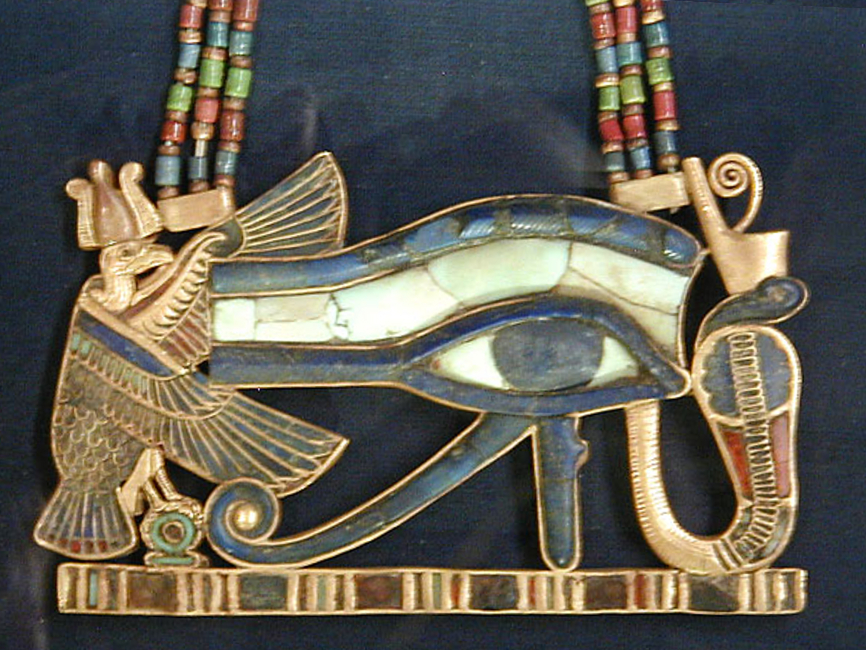
Ancient Egyptian Eye of Horus amulet

In ancient Egypt (Kemet in the Egyptian language), Magic (personified as the god Heka) was an integral part of religion and culture which is known to us through a substantial corpus of texts which are products of the Egyptian tradition.

While the category magic has been contentious for modern Egyptology, there is clear support for its applicability from ancient terminology. The Coptic term hik is the descendant of the pharaonic term heka, which, unlike its Coptic counterpart, had no connotation of impiety or illegality, and is attested from the Old Kingdom through to the Roman era. Heka was considered morally neutral and was applied to the practices and beliefs of both foreigners and Egyptians alike. The Instructions for Merikare informs us that heka was a beneficence gifted by the creator to humanity "in order to be weapons to ward off the blow of events".

Magic was practiced by both the literate priestly hierarchy and by illiterate farmers and herdsmen, and the principle of heka underlay all ritual activity, both in the temples and in private settings.

The main principle of heka is centered on the power of words to bring things into being. Karenga explains the pivotal power of words and their vital ontological role as the primary tool used by the creator to bring the manifest world into being. Because humans were understood to share a divine nature with the gods, snnw ntr (images of the god), the same power to use words creatively that the gods have is shared by humans.

==== Book of the Dead ====
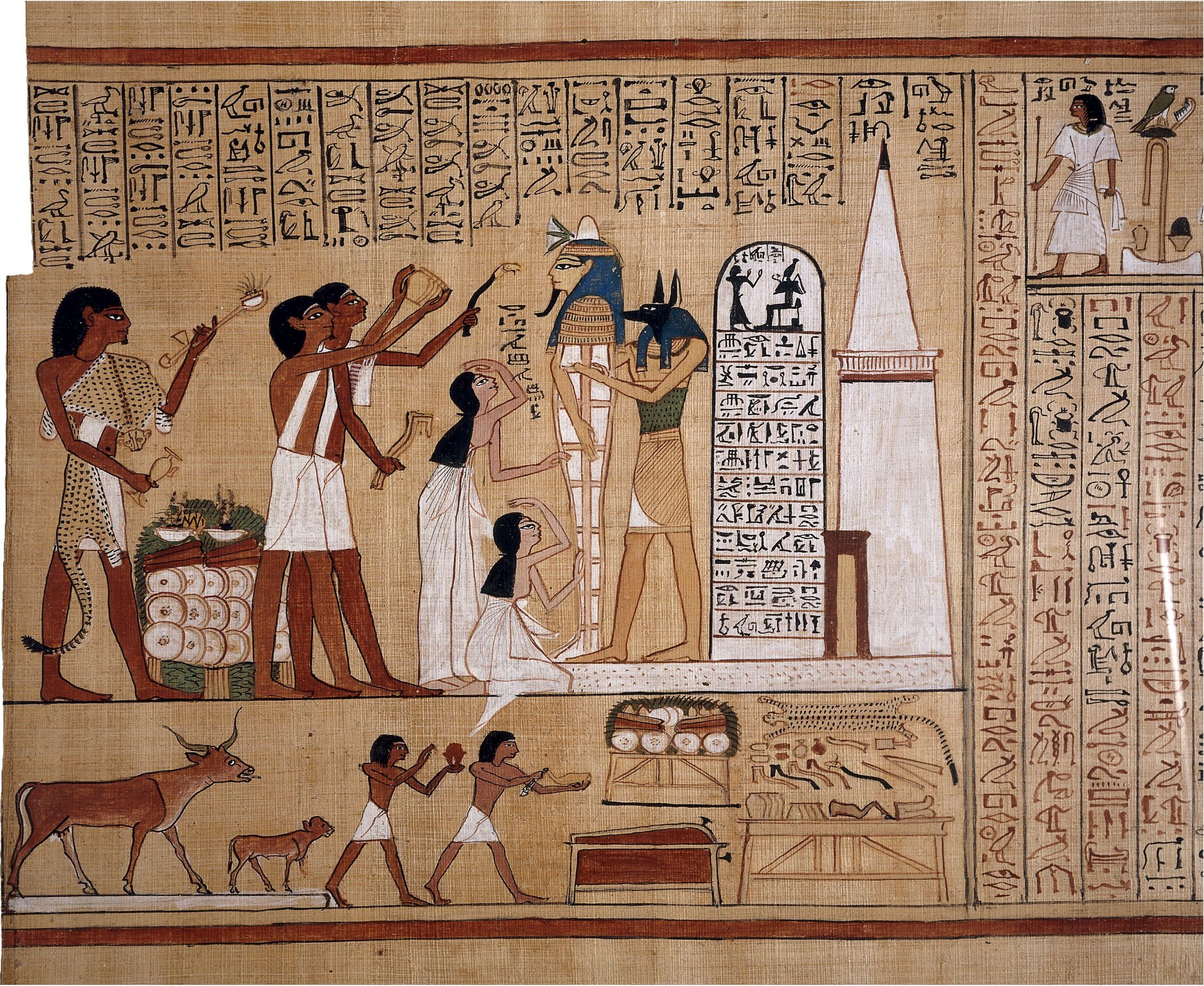
Illustration from the Book of the Dead of Hunefer showing the Opening of the Mouth ceremony being performed before the tomb

The interior walls of the pyramid of Unas, the final pharaoh of the Egyptian Fifth Dynasty, are covered in hundreds of magical spells and inscriptions, running from floor to ceiling in vertical columns. These inscriptions are known as the Pyramid Texts and they contain spells needed by the pharaoh in order to survive in the afterlife. The Pyramid Texts were strictly for royalty only; the spells were kept secret from commoners and were written only inside royal tombs. During the chaos and unrest of the First Intermediate Period, however, tomb robbers broke into the pyramids and saw the magical inscriptions. Commoners began learning the spells and, by the beginning of the Middle Kingdom, commoners began inscribing similar writings on the sides of their own coffins, hoping that doing so would ensure their own survival in the afterlife. These writings are known as the Coffin Texts.

After a person died, their corpse would be mummified and wrapped in linen bandages to ensure that the deceased's body would survive for as long as possible because the Egyptians believed that a person's soul could only survive in the afterlife for as long as their physical body survived here on earth. The last ceremony before a person's body was sealed away inside the tomb was known as the Opening of the Mouth. In this ritual, the priests would touch various magical instruments to various parts of the deceased's body, thereby giving the deceased the ability to see, hear, taste, and smell in the afterlife.

==== Amulets ====
The use of amulets (meket) was widespread among both living and dead ancient Egyptians. They were used for protection and as a means of "reaffirming the fundamental fairness of the universe". The oldest amulets found are from the predynastic Badarian Period, and they persisted through to Roman times.

=== Judea ===
In the Mosaic Law, practices such as witchcraft (Biblical Hebrew: קְסָמִ֔ים), being a soothsayer (מְעוֹנֵ֥ן) or a sorcerer (וּמְכַשֵּֽׁף) or one who conjures spells (וְחֹבֵ֖ר חָ֑בֶר) or one who calls up the dead (וְדֹרֵ֖שׁ אֶל־הַמֵּתִֽים) are specifically forbidden as abominations to the Lord.

Halakha (Jewish religious law) forbids divination and other forms of soothsaying, and the Talmud lists many persistent yet condemned divining practices. Practical Kabbalah in historical Judaism is a branch of the Jewish mystical tradition that concerns the use of magic. It was considered permitted white magic by its practitioners, reserved for the elite, who could separate its spiritual source from qlippothic realms of evil if performed under circumstances that were holy (Q-D-Š) and pure (Biblical Hebrew: טומאה וטהרה, romanized: tvmh vthrh). The concern of overstepping Judaism's strong prohibitions of impure magic ensured it remained a minor tradition in Jewish history. Its teachings include the use of Divine and angelic names for amulets and incantations. These magical practices of Judaic folk religion which became part of practical Kabbalah date from Talmudic times. The Talmud mentions the use of charms for healing, and a wide range of magical cures were sanctioned by rabbis. It was ruled that any practice actually producing a cure was not to be regarded superstitiously and there has been the widespread practice of medicinal amulets, and folk remedies (segullot) in Jewish societies across time and geography.

Although magic was forbidden by Levitical law in the Hebrew Bible, magic relates to Jewish mysticism, and Gideon Bohak believes magical "technology" could have been widely practised in the late Second Temple period, and in the period following the destruction of the temple into the 3rd, 4th, and 5th centuries C.E. Jewish and Samaritan magicians appear in the New Testament, Acts of the Apostles, and also in the works of Josephus, such as Atomos, a Jewish magician of Cyprus (Antiquities of the Jews 20:142).

=== Greco-Roman world ===
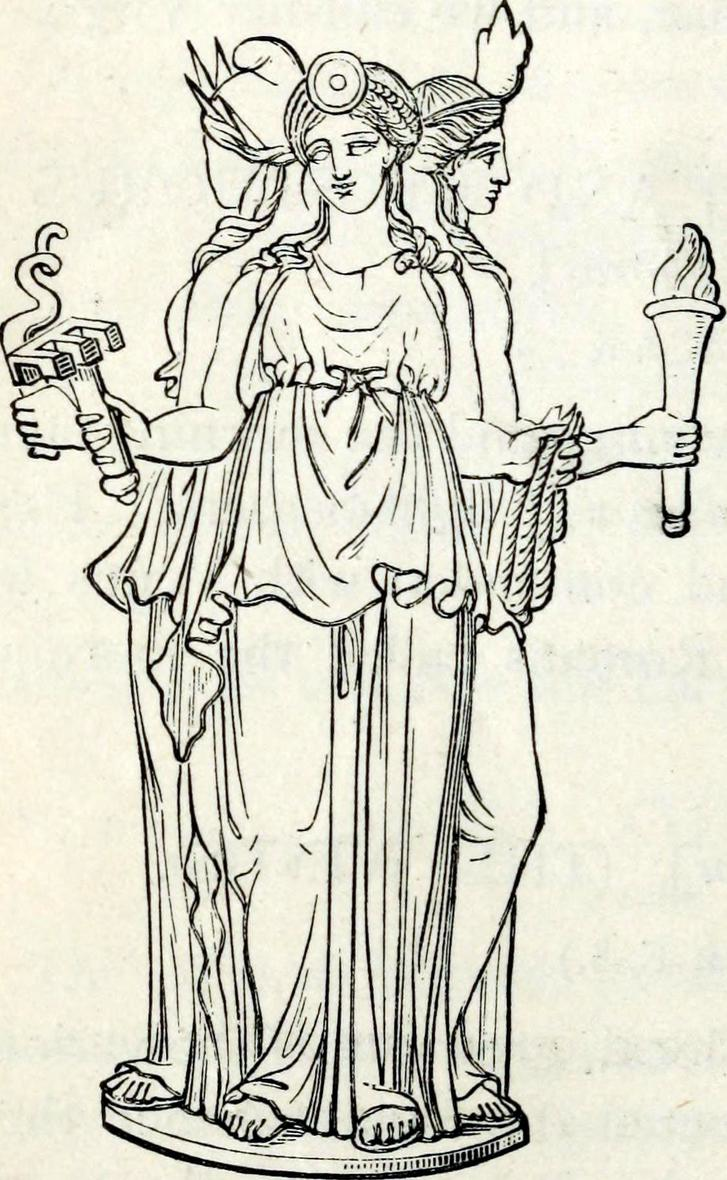
Hecate, the ancient Greek goddess of magic

During the late sixth and early fifth centuries BCE, the Persian maguš was Graecicized and introduced into the ancient Greek language as μάγος and μαγεία. In doing so it transformed meaning, gaining negative connotations, with the magos being regarded as a charlatan whose ritual practices were fraudulent, strange, unconventional, and dangerous. As noted by Davies, for the ancient Greeks—and subsequently for the ancient Romans—"magic was not distinct from religion but rather an unwelcome, improper expression of it—the religion of the other". The historian Richard Gordon suggested that for the ancient Greeks, being accused of practicing magic was "a form of insult".

This change in meaning was influenced by the military conflicts that the Greek city-states were then engaged in against the Persian Empire. In this context, the term makes appearances in such surviving text as Sophocles' Oedipus Rex, Hippocrates' De morbo sacro, and Gorgias' Encomium of Helen. In Sophocles' play, for example, the character Oedipus derogatorily refers to the seer Tiresius as a magos—in this context meaning something akin to quack or charlatan—reflecting how this epithet was no longer reserved only for Persians.

In the first century BCE, the Greek concept of the magos was adopted into Latin and used by a number of ancient Roman writers as magus and magia. The earliest known Latin use of the term was in Virgil's Eclogue, written around 40 BCE, which makes reference to magicis ... sacris (magic rites). The Romans already had other terms for the negative use of supernatural powers, such as veneficus and saga. The Roman use of the term was similar to that of the Greeks, but placed greater emphasis on the judicial application of it. Within the Roman Empire, laws would be introduced criminalising things regarded as magic.

In ancient Roman society, magic was associated with societies to the east of the empire; the first century CE writer Pliny the Elder for instance claimed that magic had been created by the Iranian philosopher Zoroaster, and that it had then been brought west into Greece by the magician Osthanes, who accompanied the military campaigns of the Persian King Xerxes.

Ancient Greek scholarship of the 20th century, almost certainly influenced by Christianising preconceptions of the meanings of magic and religion, and the wish to establish Greek culture as the foundation of Western rationality, developed a theory of ancient Greek magic as primitive and insignificant, and thereby essentially separate from Homeric, communal (polis) religion. Since the last decade of the century, however, recognising the ubiquity and respectability of acts such as katadesmoi (binding spells), described as magic by modern and ancient observers alike, scholars have been compelled to abandon this viewpoint. The Greek word mageuo (practice magic) itself derives from the word Magos, originally simply the Greek name for a Persian tribe known for practicing religion. Non-civic mystery cults have been similarly re-evaluated:

the choices which lay outside the range of cults did not just add additional options to the civic menu, but ... sometimes incorporated critiques of the civic cults and Panhellenic myths or were genuine alternatives to them.

— Simon Price, Religions of the Ancient Greeks (1999)

Katadesmoi (Latin: defixiones), curses inscribed on wax or lead tablets and buried underground, were frequently executed by all strata of Greek society, sometimes to protect the entire polis. Communal curses carried out in public declined after the Greek classical period, but private curses remained common throughout antiquity. They were distinguished as magical by their individualistic, instrumental and sinister qualities. These qualities, and their perceived deviation from inherently mutable cultural constructs of normality, most clearly delineate ancient magic from the religious rituals of which they form a part.

A large number of magical papyri, in Greek, Coptic, and Demotic, have been recovered and translated. They contain early instances of:

- the use of magic words said to have the power to command spirits;
- the use of mysterious symbols or sigils which are thought to be useful when invoking or evoking spirits.

The practice of magic was banned in the late Roman world, and the Codex Theodosianus (438 AD) states:

If any wizard therefore or person imbued with magical contamination who is called by custom of the people a magician ... should be apprehended in my retinue, or in that of the Caesar, he shall not escape punishment and torture by the protection of his rank.

=== Middle Ages ===
Magic practices such as divination, interpretation of omens, sorcery, and use of charms had been specifically forbidden in Mosaic Law and condemned in Biblical histories of the kings. Many of these practices were spoken against in the New Testament as well.

Some commentators say that in the first century CE, early Christian authors absorbed the Greco-Roman concept of magic and incorporated it into their developing Christian theology, and that these Christians retained the already implied Greco-Roman negative stereotypes of the term and extended them by incorporating conceptual patterns borrowed from Jewish thought, in particular the opposition of magic and miracle. Some early Christian authors followed the Greek-Roman thinking by ascribing the origin of magic to the human realm, mainly to Zoroaster and Osthanes. The Christian view was that magic was a product of the Babylonians, Persians, or Egyptians. The Christians shared with earlier classical culture the idea that magic was something distinct from proper religion, although drew their distinction between the two in different ways.

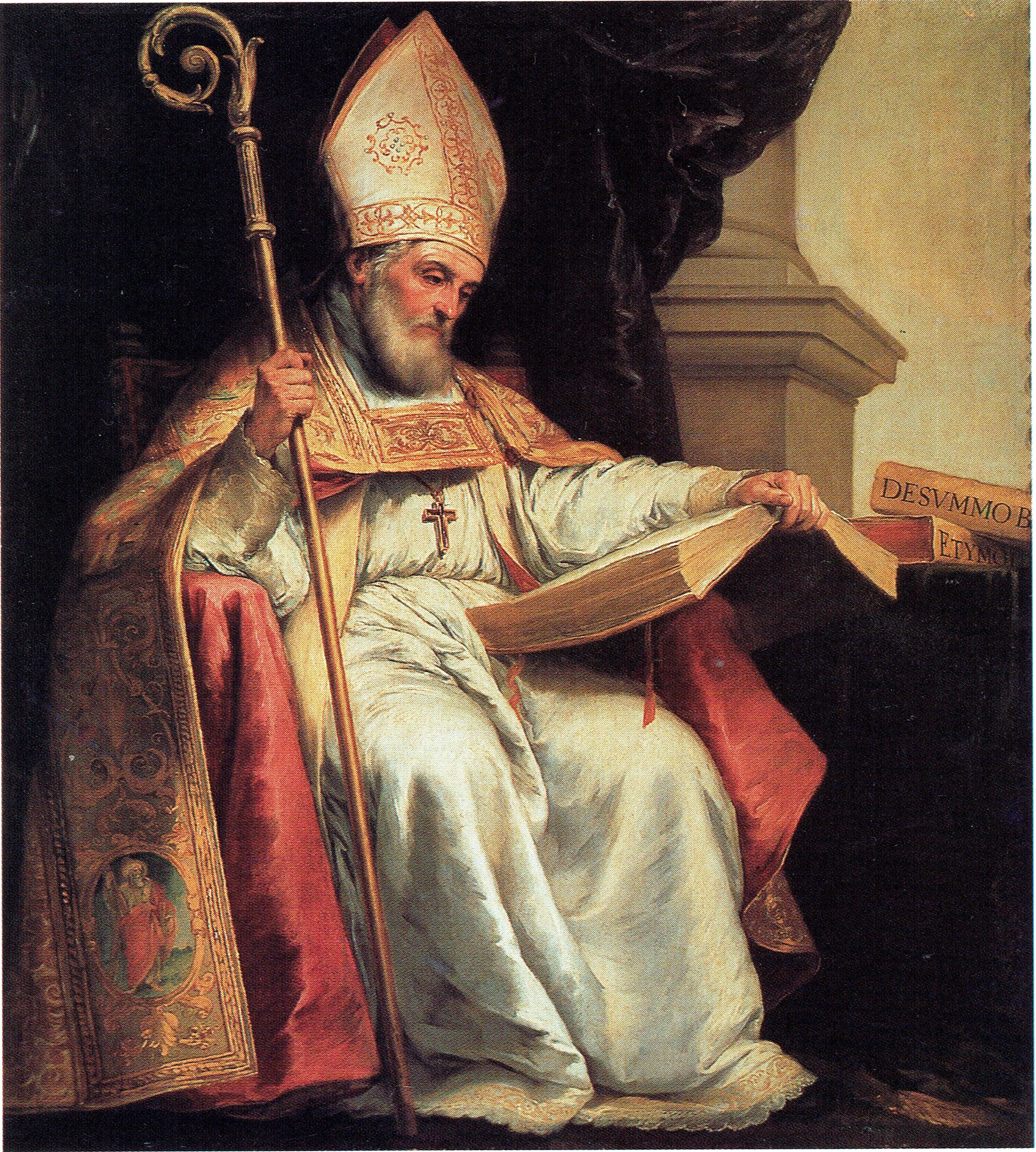
A 17th-century depiction of the medieval writer Isidore of Seville, who provided a list of activities he regarded as magical

For early Christian writers like Augustine of Hippo, magic did not merely constitute fraudulent and unsanctioned ritual practices, but was the very opposite of religion because it relied upon cooperation from demons, the henchmen of Satan. In this, Christian ideas of magic were closely linked to the Christian category of paganism, and both magic and paganism were regarded as belonging under the broader category of superstitio (superstition), another term borrowed from pre-Christian Roman culture. This Christian emphasis on the inherent immorality and wrongness of magic as something conflicting with good religion was far starker than the approach in the other large monotheistic religions of the period, Judaism and Islam. For instance, while Christians regarded demons as inherently evil, the jinn—comparable entities in Islamic mythology—were perceived as more ambivalent figures by Muslims.

The model of the magician in Christian thought was provided by Simon Magus, (Simon the Magician), a figure who opposed Saint Peter in both the Acts of the Apostles and the apocryphal yet influential Acts of Peter. The historian Michael D. Bailey stated that in medieval Europe, magic was a "relatively broad and encompassing category". Christian theologians believed that there were multiple different forms of magic, the majority of which were types of divination, for instance, Isidore of Seville produced a catalogue of things he regarded as magic in which he listed divination by the four elements i.e. geomancy, hydromancy, aeromancy, and pyromancy, as well as by observation of natural phenomena e.g. the flight of birds and astrology. He also mentioned enchantment and ligatures (the medical use of magical objects bound to the patient) as being magical. Medieval Europe also saw magic come to be associated with the Old Testament figure of Solomon; various grimoires, or books outlining magical practices, were written that claimed to have been written by Solomon, most notably the Key of Solomon.

In early medieval Europe, magia was a term of condemnation. In medieval Europe, Christians often suspected Muslims and Jews of engaging in magical practices; in certain cases, these perceived magical rites—including the alleged Jewish sacrifice of Christian children—resulted in Christians massacring these religious minorities. Christian groups often also accused other, rival Christian groups such as the Hussites—which they regarded as heretical—of engaging in magical activities. Medieval Europe also saw the term maleficium applied to forms of magic that were conducted with the intention of causing harm. The later Middle Ages saw words for these practitioners of harmful magical acts appear in various European languages: sorcière in French, Hexe in German, strega in Italian, and bruja in Spanish. The English term for malevolent practitioners of magic, witch, derived from the earlier Old English term wicce.

Ars Magica or magic is a major component and supporting contribution to the belief and practice of spiritual, and in many cases, physical healing throughout the Middle Ages. Emanating from many modern interpretations lies a trail of misconceptions about magic, one of the largest revolving around wickedness or the existence of nefarious beings who practice it. These misinterpretations stem from numerous acts or rituals that have been performed throughout antiquity, and due to their exoticism from the commoner's perspective, the rituals invoked uneasiness and an even stronger sense of dismissal.

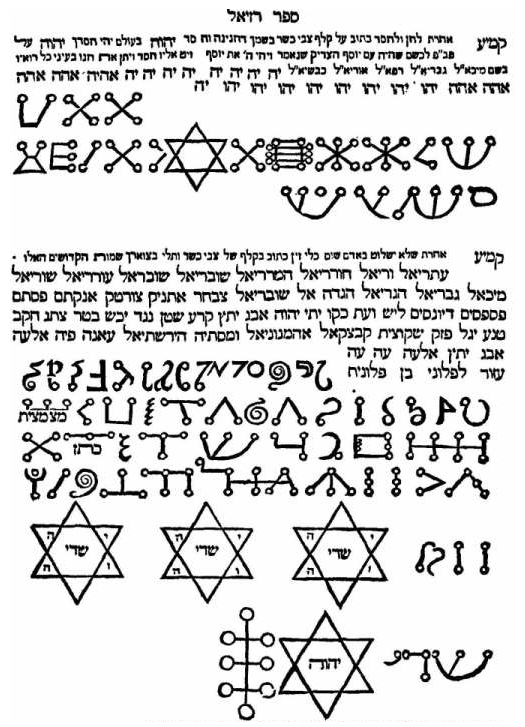
An excerpt from Sefer Raziel HaMalakh, featuring various magical sigils (סגולות segulot in Hebrew)

In the Medieval Jewish view, the separation of the mystical and magical elements of Kabbalah, dividing it into speculative theological Kabbalah (Kabbalah Iyyunit) with its meditative traditions, and theurgic practical Kabbalah (Kabbalah Ma'asit), had occurred by the beginning of the 14th century.

One societal force in the Middle Ages more powerful than the singular commoner, the Christian Church, rejected magic as a whole because it was viewed as a means of tampering with the natural world in a supernatural manner associated with the biblical verses of Deuteronomy 18:9–12. Despite the many negative connotations which surround the term magic, there exist many elements that are seen in a divine or holy light.

The divine right of kings in England was thought to be able to give them "sacred magic" power to heal thousands of their subjects from sicknesses.

Diversified instruments or rituals used in medieval magic include, but are not limited to: various amulets, talismans, potions, as well as specific chants, dances, and prayers. Along with these rituals are the adversely imbued notions of demonic participation which influence them. The idea that magic was devised, taught, and worked by demons would have seemed reasonable to anyone who read the Greek magical papyri or the Sefer-ha-Razim and found that healing magic appeared alongside rituals for killing people, gaining wealth, or personal advantage, and coercing women into sexual submission. Archaeology is contributing to a fuller understanding of ritual practices performed in the home, on the body and in monastic and church settings.

The Islamic reaction towards magic did not condemn magic in general and distinguished between magic which can heal sickness and possession, and sorcery. The former is therefore a special gift from God, while the latter is achieved through help of Jinn and devils. Ibn al-Nadim held that exorcists gain their power by their obedience to God, while sorcerers please the devils by acts of disobedience and sacrifices and they in return do him a favor. According to Ibn Arabi, Al-Ḥajjāj ibn Yusuf al-Shubarbuli was able to walk on water due to his piety. According to the Quran 2:102, magic was also taught to humans by devils and the angels Harut and Marut.

The influence of Arab Islamic magic in medieval and Renaissance Europe was very notable. Some magic books such as Picatrix and Al Kindi's De Radiis were the basis for much of medieval magic in Europe and for subsequent developments in the Renaissance. Another Arab Muslim author fundamental to the developments of medieval and Renaissance European magic was Ahmad al-Buni, with his books such as the Shams al-Ma'arif which deal above all with the evocation and invocation of spirits or jinn to control them, obtain powers and make wishes come true. These books are still important to the Islamic world specifically in Simiyya, a doctrine found commonly within Sufi-occult traditions.

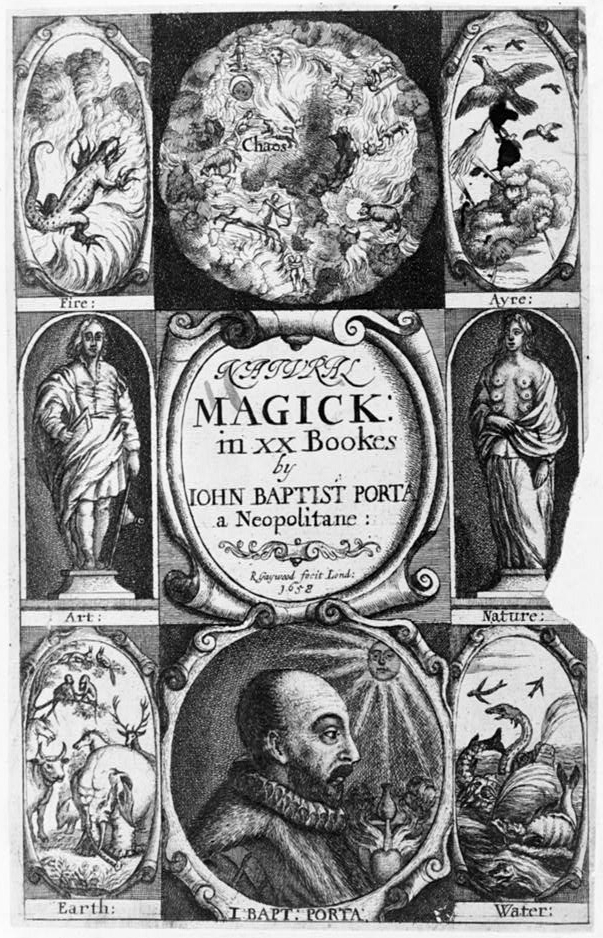
Frontispiece of an English translation of Natural Magick published in London in 1658

During the early modern period, the concept of magic underwent a more positive reassessment through the development of the concept of magia naturalis (natural magic). This was a term introduced and developed by two Italian humanists, Marsilio Ficino and Giovanni Pico della Mirandola. For them, magia was viewed as an elemental force pervading many natural processes, and thus was fundamentally distinct from the mainstream Christian idea of demonic magic. Their ideas influenced an array of later philosophers and writers, among them Paracelsus, Giordano Bruno, Johannes Reuchlin, and Johannes Trithemius. According to the historian Richard Kieckhefer, the concept of magia naturalis took "firm hold in European culture" during the fourteenth and fifteenth centuries, attracting the interest of natural philosophers of various theoretical orientations, including Aristotelians, Neoplatonists, and Hermeticists.

Adherents of this position argued that magia could appear in both good and bad forms; in 1625, the French librarian Gabriel Naudé wrote his Apology for all the Wise Men Falsely Suspected of Magic, in which he distinguished "Mosoaicall Magick"—which he claimed came from God and included prophecies, miracles, and speaking in tongues—from "geotick" magic caused by demons. While the proponents of magia naturalis insisted that this did not rely on the actions of demons, critics disagreed, arguing that the demons had simply deceived these magicians. By the seventeenth century the concept of magia naturalis had moved in increasingly 'naturalistic' directions, with the distinctions between it and science becoming blurred. The validity of magia naturalis as a concept for understanding the universe then came under increasing criticism during the Age of Enlightenment in the eighteenth century.

Despite the attempt to reclaim the term magia for use in a positive sense, it did not supplant traditional attitudes toward magic in the West, which remained largely negative. At the same time as magia naturalis was attracting interest and was largely tolerated, Europe saw an active persecution of accused witches believed to be guilty of maleficia. Reflecting the term's continued negative associations, Protestants often sought to denigrate Roman Catholic sacramental and devotional practices as being magical rather than religious. Many Roman Catholics were concerned by this allegation and for several centuries various Roman Catholic writers devoted attention to arguing that their practices were religious rather than magical. At the same time, Protestants often used the accusation of magic against other Protestant groups which they were in contest with. In this way, the concept of magic was used to prescribe what was appropriate as religious belief and practice. Similar claims were also being made in the Islamic world during this period. The Arabian cleric Muhammad ibn Abd al-Wahhab—founder of Wahhabism—for instance condemned a range of customs and practices such as divination and the veneration of spirits as sihr, which he in turn claimed was a form of shirk, the sin of idolatry.

=== The Renaissance ===
Renaissance humanism saw a resurgence in hermeticism and Neo-Platonic varieties of ceremonial magic. The Renaissance, on the other hand, saw the rise of science, in such forms as the dethronement of the Ptolemaic theory of the universe, the distinction of astronomy from astrology, and of chemistry from alchemy.

There was great uncertainty in distinguishing practices of superstition, occultism, and perfectly sound scholarly knowledge or pious ritual. The intellectual and spiritual tensions erupted in the early modern witch craze, further reinforced by the turmoil of the Protestant Reformation, especially in Germany, England, and Scotland.

In Hasidism, the displacement of practical Kabbalah using directly magical means, by conceptual and meditative trends gained much further emphasis, while simultaneously instituting meditative theurgy for material blessings at the heart of its social mysticism. Hasidism internalised Kabbalah through the psychology of deveikut (cleaving to God), and cleaving to the Tzadik (Hasidic Rebbe). In Hasidic doctrine, the tzaddik channels Divine spiritual and physical bounty to his followers by altering the Will of God (uncovering a deeper concealed Will) through his own deveikut and self-nullification. Dov Ber of Mezeritch is concerned to distinguish this theory of the Tzadik's will altering and deciding the Divine Will, from directly magical process.

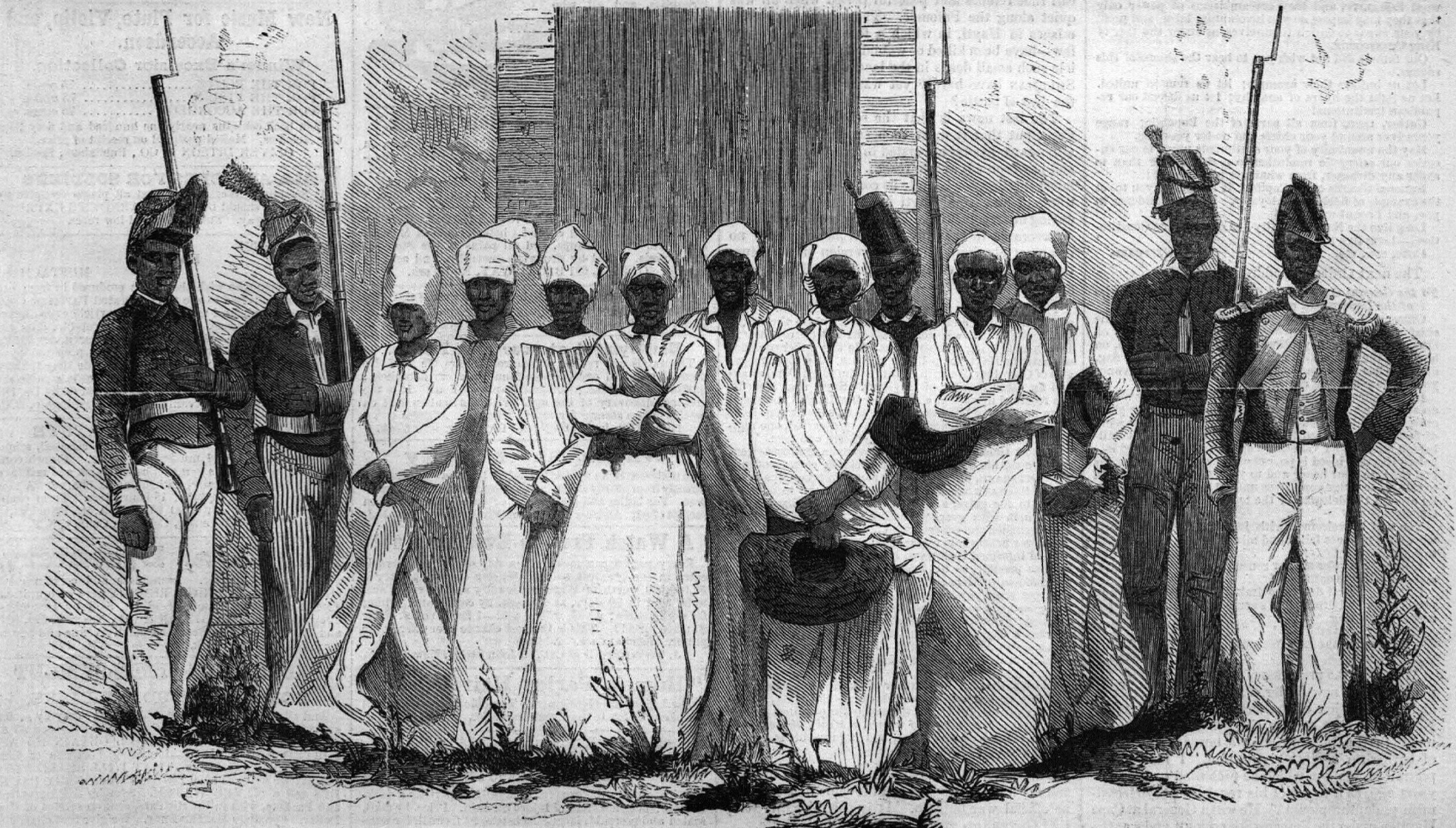
In the nineteenth century, the Haitian government began to legislate against Vodou, describing it as a form of witchcraft; this conflicted with Vodou practitioners' own understanding of their religion.

In the sixteenth century, European societies began to conquer and colonise other continents around the world, and as they did so they applied European concepts of magic and witchcraft to practices found among the peoples whom they encountered. Usually, these European colonialists regarded the natives as primitives and savages whose belief systems were diabolical and needed to be eradicated and replaced by Christianity. Because Europeans typically viewed these non-European peoples as being morally and intellectually inferior to themselves, it was expected that such societies would be more prone to practicing magic. Women who practiced traditional rites were labelled as witches by the Europeans.

In various cases, these imported European concepts and terms underwent new transformations as they merged with indigenous concepts. In West Africa, for instance, Portuguese travellers introduced their term and concept of the feitiçaria (often translated as sorcery) and the feitiço (spell) to the native population, where it was transformed into the concept of the fetish. When later Europeans encountered these West African societies, they wrongly believed that the fetiche was an indigenous African term rather than the result of earlier inter-continental encounters. Sometimes, colonised populations themselves adopted these European concepts for their own purposes. In the early nineteenth century, the newly independent Haitian government of Jean-Jacques Dessalines began to suppress the practice of Vodou, and in 1835 Haitian law-codes categorised all Vodou practices as sortilège (sorcery/witchcraft), suggesting that it was all conducted with harmful intent, whereas among Vodou practitioners the performance of harmful rites was already given a separate and distinct category, known as maji.

=== Baroque period ===
During the Baroque era, several intriguing figures engaged with occult and magical themes that went beyond conventional thinking. Michael Sendivogius (1566–1636), a Polish alchemist, emphasized empirical experimentation in alchemy and made notable contributions to early chemistry. Tommaso Campanella (1568–1639), an Italian philosopher, blended Christianity with mysticism in works like The City of the Sun, envisioning an ideal society governed by divine principles. Jakob Böhme (1575–1624), a German mystic, explored the relationship between the divine and human experience, influencing later mystical movements.

Jan Baptist van Helmont, a Flemish chemist, coined the term "gas" and conducted experiments on plant growth, expanding the understanding of chemistry. Sir Kenelm Digby, known for his diverse interests, created the "Sympathetic Powder", believed to have mystical healing properties. Isaac Newton, famous for his scientific achievements, also delved into alchemy and collected esoteric manuscripts, revealing his fascination with hidden knowledge. These individuals collectively embody the curiosity and exploration characteristic of the Baroque period.

=== Modernity ===
By the nineteenth century, European intellectuals no longer saw the practice of magic through the framework of sin and instead regarded magical practices and beliefs as "an aberrational mode of thought antithetical to the dominant cultural logic—a sign of psychological impairment and marker of racial or cultural inferiority".

As educated elites in Western societies increasingly rejected the efficacy of magical practices, legal systems ceased to threaten practitioners of magical activities with punishment for the crimes of diabolism and witchcraft, and instead threatened them with the accusation that they were defrauding people through promising to provide things which they could not.

This spread of European colonial power across the world influenced how academics would come to frame the concept of magic. In the nineteenth century, several scholars adopted the traditional, negative concept of magic. That they chose to do so was not inevitable, for they could have followed the example adopted by prominent esotericists active at the time like Helena Blavatsky who had chosen to use the term and concept of magic in a positive sense. Various writers also used the concept of magic to criticise religion by arguing that the latter still displayed many of the negative traits of the former. An example of this was the American journalist H. L. Mencken in his polemical 1930 work Treatise on the Gods; he sought to critique religion by comparing it to magic, arguing that the division between the two was misplaced. The concept of magic was also adopted by theorists in the new field of psychology, where it was often used synonymously with superstition, although the latter term proved more common in early psychological texts.

In the late nineteenth and twentieth centuries, folklorists examined rural communities across Europe in search of magical practices, which at the time they typically understood as survivals of ancient belief systems. It was only in the 1960s that anthropologists like Jeanne Favret-Saada also began looking in depth at magic in European contexts, having previously focused on examining magic in non-Western contexts. In the twentieth century, magic also proved a topic of interest to the Surrealists, an artistic movement based largely in Europe; the Surrealist André Breton for instance published L'Art magique in 1957, discussing what he regarded as the links between magic and art.

The scholarly application of magic as a sui generis category that can be applied to any socio-cultural context was linked with the promotion of modernity to both Western and non-Western audiences.

The term magic has become pervasive in the popular imagination and idiom. In contemporary contexts, the word magic is sometimes used to "describe a type of excitement, of wonder, or sudden delight", and in such a context can be "a term of high praise". Despite its historical contrast against science, scientists have also adopted the term in application to various concepts, such as magic acid, magic bullets, and magic angles.

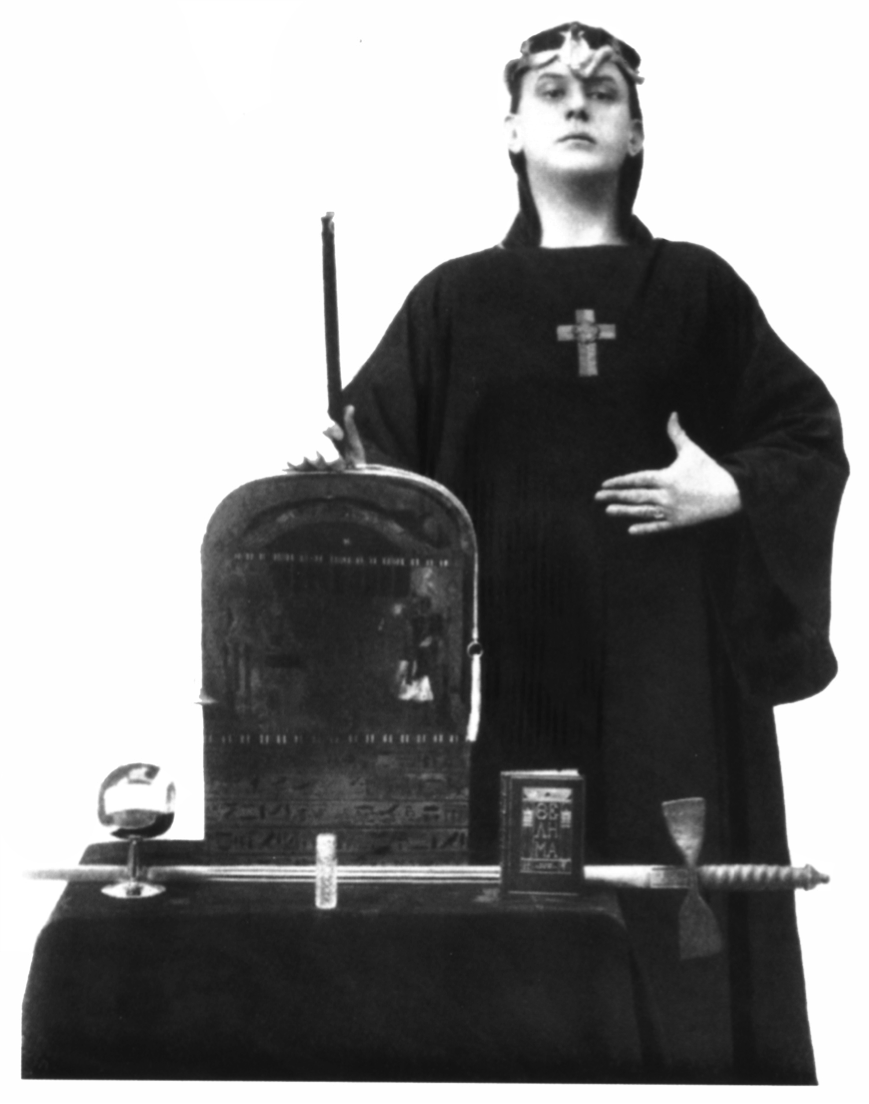
Many concepts of modern ceremonial magic are heavily influenced by the ideas of Aleister Crowley (1912).

Modern Western magic has challenged widely-held preconceptions about contemporary religion and spirituality. The polemical discourses about magic influenced the self-understanding of modern magicians, several whom—such as Aleister Crowley—were well versed in academic literature on the subject. According to scholar of religion Henrik Bogdan, "arguably the best known emic definition" of the term magic was provided by Crowley. Crowley—who favoured the spelling 'magick' over magic to distinguish it from stage illusionism—was of the view that "Magick is the Science and Art of causing Change to occur in conformity with Will". Crowley's definition influenced that of subsequent magicians. Dion Fortune, the founder of Fraternity of the Inner Light for instance stated that "Magic is the art of changing consciousness according to Will". Gerald Gardner, the founder of Gardnerian Wicca, stated that magic was "attempting to cause the physically unusual", while Anton LaVey, the founder of LaVeyan Satanism, described magic as "the change in situations or events in accordance with one's will, which would, using normally acceptable methods, be unchangeable".

The chaos magic movement emerged during the late 20th century, as an attempt to strip away the symbolic, ritualistic, theological or otherwise ornamental aspects of other occult traditions and distill magic down to a set of basic techniques.

These modern Western concepts of magic rely on a belief in correspondences connected to an unknown occult force that permeates the universe. As noted by Hanegraaff, this operated according to "a new meaning of magic, which could not possibly have existed in earlier periods, precisely because it is elaborated in reaction to the 'disenchantment of the world'". For many, and perhaps most, modern Western magicians, the goal of magic is deemed to be personal spiritual development. The perception of magic as a form of self-development is central to the way that magical practices have been adopted into forms of modern Paganism and the New Age phenomenon. One significant development within modern Western magical practices has been sex magic. This was a practice promoted in the writings of Paschal Beverly Randolph and subsequently exerted a strong interest on occultist magicians like Crowley and Theodor Reuss.

The adoption of the term magic by modern occultists can in some instances be a deliberate attempt to champion those areas of Western society which have traditionally been marginalised as a means of subverting dominant systems of power. The influential American Wiccan and author Starhawk for instance stated that "Magic is another word that makes people uneasy, so I use it deliberately, because the words we are comfortable with, the words that sound acceptable, rational, scientific, and intellectually correct, are comfortable precisely because they are the language of estrangement." In the present day, "among some countercultural subgroups the label is considered 'cool'".

==== Conceptual development ====
According to anthropologist Edward Evan Evans-Pritchard, magic formed a rational framework of beliefs and knowledge in some cultures, like the Azande people of Africa. The historian Owen Davies stated that the word magic was "beyond simple definition", and had "a range of meanings". Similarly, the historian Michael D. Bailey characterised magic as "a deeply contested category and a very fraught label"; as a category, he noted, it was "profoundly unstable" given that definitions of the term have "varied dramatically across time and between cultures". Scholars have engaged in extensive debates as to how to define magic, with such debates resulting in intense dispute. Throughout such debates, the scholarly community has failed to agree on a definition of magic, in a similar manner to how they have failed to agree on a definition of religion. According with scholar of religion Michael Stausberg the phenomenon of people applying the concept of magic to refer to themselves and their own practices and beliefs goes as far back as late antiquity. However, even among those throughout history who have described themselves as magicians, there has been no common ground of what magic is.

In Africa, the word magic might simply be understood as denoting management of forces, which, as an activity, is not weighted morally and is accordingly a neutral activity from the start of a magical practice, but by the will of the magician, is thought to become and to have an outcome which represents either good or bad (evil). Ancient African culture was in the habit customarily of always discerning difference between magic, and a group of other things, which are not magic, these things were medicine, divination, witchcraft and sorcery. Opinion differs on how religion and magic are related to each other with respect development or to which developed from which, some think they developed together from a shared origin, some think religion developed from magic, and some, magic from religion.

Anthropological and sociological theories of magic generally serve to sharply demarcate certain practices from other, otherwise similar practices in a given society. According to Bailey: "In many cultures and across various historical periods, categories of magic often define and maintain the limits of socially and culturally acceptable actions in respect to numinous or occult entities or forces. Even more, basically, they serve to delineate arenas of appropriate belief." In this, he noted that "drawing these distinctions is an exercise in power". This tendency has had repercussions for the study of magic, with academics self-censoring their research because of the effects on their careers.

Randall Styers noted that attempting to define magic represents "an act of demarcation" by which it is juxtaposed against "other social practices and modes of knowledge" such as religion and science. The historian Karen Louise Jolly described magic as "a category of exclusion, used to define an unacceptable way of thinking as either the opposite of religion or of science".

Modern scholarship has produced various definitions and theories of magic. According to Bailey, "these have typically framed magic in relation to, or more frequently in distinction from, religion and science." Since the emergence of the study of religion and the social sciences, magic has been a "central theme in the theoretical literature" produced by scholars operating in these academic disciplines. Magic is one of the most heavily theorized concepts in the study of religion, and also played a key role in early theorising within anthropology. Styers believed that it held such a strong appeal for social theorists because it provides "such a rich site for articulating and contesting the nature and boundaries of modernity". Scholars have commonly used it as a foil for the concept of religion, regarding magic as the "illegitimate (and effeminized) sibling" of religion. Alternately, others have used it as a middle-ground category located between religion and science.

The context in which scholars framed their discussions of magic was informed by the spread of European colonial power across the world in the modern period. These repeated attempts to define magic resonated with broader social concerns, and the pliability of the concept has allowed it to be "readily adaptable as a polemical and ideological tool". The links that intellectuals made between magic and those they characterized as primitives helped to legitimise European and Euro-American imperialism and colonialism, as these Western colonialists expressed the view that those who believed in and practiced magic were unfit to govern themselves and should be governed by those who, rather than believing in magic, believed in science and/or (Christian) religion. In Bailey's words, "the association of certain peoples [whether non-Europeans or poor, rural Europeans] with magic served to distance and differentiate them from those who ruled over them, and in large part to justify that rule."

Many different definitions of magic have been offered by scholars, although—according to Hanegraaff—these can be understood as variations of a small number of heavily influential theories.

===== Intellectualist approach =====
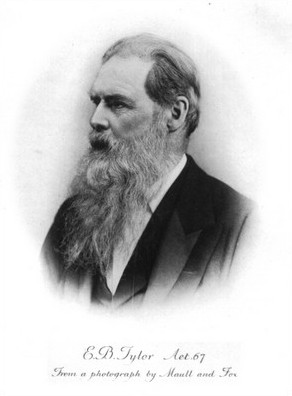
Edward Tylor, an anthropologist who used the term magic in reference to sympathetic magic, an idea that he associated with his concept of animism

The intellectualist approach to defining magic is associated with two British anthropologists, Edward Tylor and James G. Frazer. This approach viewed magic as the theoretical opposite of science, and came to preoccupy much anthropological thought on the subject. This approach was situated within the evolutionary models which underpinned thinking in the social sciences during the early 19th century. The first social scientist to present magic as something that predated religion in an evolutionary development was Herbert Spencer; in his A System of Synthetic Philosophy, he used the term magic in reference to sympathetic magic. Spencer regarded both magic and religion as being rooted in false speculation about the nature of objects and their relationship to other things.

Tylor's understanding of magic was linked to his concept of animism. In his 1871 book Primitive Culture, Tylor characterized magic as beliefs based on "the error of mistaking ideal analogy for real analogy". In Tylor's view, "primitive man, having come to associate in thought those things which he found by experience to be connected in fact, proceeded erroneously to invert this action, and to conclude that association in thought must involve similar connection in reality. He thus attempted to discover, to foretell, and to cause events by means of processes which we can now see to have only an ideal significance". Tylor was dismissive of magic, describing it as "one of the most pernicious delusions that ever vexed mankind". Tylor's views proved highly influential, and helped to establish magic as a major topic of anthropological research.

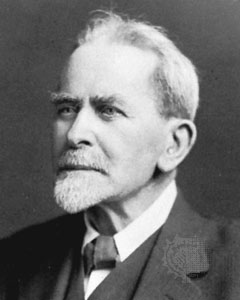
James Frazer regarded magic as the first stage in human development, to be followed by religion and then science.

Tylor's ideas were adopted and simplified by James Frazer. He used the term magic to mean sympathetic magic, describing it as a practice relying on the magician's belief "that things act on each other at a distance through a secret sympathy", something which he described as "an invisible ether". He further divided this magic into two forms, the "homeopathic (imitative, mimetic)" and the "contagious". The former was the idea that "like produces like", or that the similarity between two objects could result in one influencing the other. The latter was based on the idea that contact between two objects allowed the two to continue to influence one another at a distance. Like Taylor, Frazer viewed magic negatively, describing it as "the bastard sister of science", arising from "one great disastrous fallacy".

Where Frazer differed from Tylor was in characterizing a belief in magic as a major stage in humanity's cultural development, describing it as part of a tripartite division in which magic came first, religion came second, and eventually science came third. For Frazer, all early societies started as believers in magic, with some of them moving away from this and into religion. He believed that both magic and religion involved a belief in spirits but that they differed in the way that they responded to these spirits. For Frazer, magic "constrains or coerces" these spirits while religion focuses on "conciliating or propitiating them". He acknowledged that their common ground resulted in a cross-over of magical and religious elements in various instances; for instance he claimed that the sacred marriage was a fertility ritual which combined elements from both world-views.

Some scholars retained the evolutionary framework used by Frazer but changed the order of its stages; the German ethnologist Wilhelm Schmidt argued that religion—by which he meant monotheism—was the first stage of human belief, which later degenerated into both magic and polytheism. Others rejected the evolutionary framework entirely. Frazer's notion that magic had given way to religion as part of an evolutionary framework was later deconstructed by the folklorist and anthropologist Andrew Lang in his essay "Magic and Religion"; Lang did so by highlighting how Frazer's framework relied upon misrepresenting ethnographic accounts of beliefs and practices among indigenous Australians to fit his concept of magic.

===== Functionalist approach =====
The functionalist approach to defining magic is associated with the French sociologists Marcel Mauss and Emile Durkheim. In this approach, magic is understood as being the theoretical opposite of religion.

Mauss set forth his conception of magic in a 1902 essay, "A General Theory of Magic". Mauss used the term magic in reference to "any rite that is not part of an organized cult: a rite that is private, secret, mysterious, and ultimately tending towards one that is forbidden". Conversely, he associated religion with organised cult. By saying that magic was inherently non-social, Mauss had been influenced by the traditional Christian understandings of the concept. Mauss deliberately rejected the intellectualist approach promoted by Frazer, believing that it was inappropriate to restrict the term magic to sympathetic magic, as Frazer had done. He expressed the view that "there are not only magical rites which are not sympathetic, but neither is sympathy a prerogative of magic, since there are sympathetic practices in religion".

Mauss' ideas were adopted by Durkheim in his 1912 book The Elementary Forms of the Religious Life. Durkheim was of the view that both magic and religion pertained to "sacred things, that is to say, things set apart and forbidden". Where he saw them as being different was in their social organisation. Durkheim used the term magic to describe things that were inherently anti-social, existing in contrast to what he referred to as a Church, the religious beliefs shared by a social group; in his words, "There is no Church of magic." Durkheim expressed the view that "there is something inherently anti-religious about the maneuvers of the magician", and that a belief in magic "does not result in binding together those who adhere to it, nor in uniting them into a group leading a common life." Durkheim's definition encounters problems in situations—such as the rites performed by Wiccans—in which acts carried out communally have been regarded, either by practitioners or observers, as being magical.

Scholars have criticized the idea that magic and religion can be differentiated into two distinct, separate categories. The social anthropologist Alfred Radcliffe-Brown suggested that "a simple dichotomy between magic and religion" was unhelpful and thus both should be subsumed under the broader category of ritual. Many later anthropologists followed his example. Nevertheless, this distinction is still often made by scholars discussing this topic.

===== Emotionalist approach =====
The emotionalist approach to magic is associated with the English anthropologist Robert Ranulph Marett, the Austrian Sigmund Freud, and the Polish anthropologist Bronisław Malinowski.

Marett viewed magic as a response to stress. In a 1904 article, he argued that magic was a cathartic or stimulating practice designed to relieve feelings of tension. As his thought developed, he increasingly rejected the idea of a division between magic and religion and began to use the term "magico-religious" to describe the early development of both. Malinowski similarly understood magic to Marett, tackling the issue in a 1925 article. He rejected Frazer's evolutionary hypothesis that magic was followed by religion and then science as a series of distinct stages in societal development, arguing that all three were present in each society. In his view, both magic and religion "arise and function in situations of emotional stress" although whereas religion is primarily expressive, magic is primarily practical. He therefore defined magic as "a practical art consisting of acts which are only means to a definite end expected to follow later on". For Malinowski, magical acts were to be carried out for a specific end, whereas religious ones were ends in themselves. He for instance believed that fertility rituals were magical because they were carried out with the intention of meeting a specific need. As part of his functionalist approach, Malinowski saw magic not as irrational but as something that served a useful function, being sensible within the given social and environmental context.

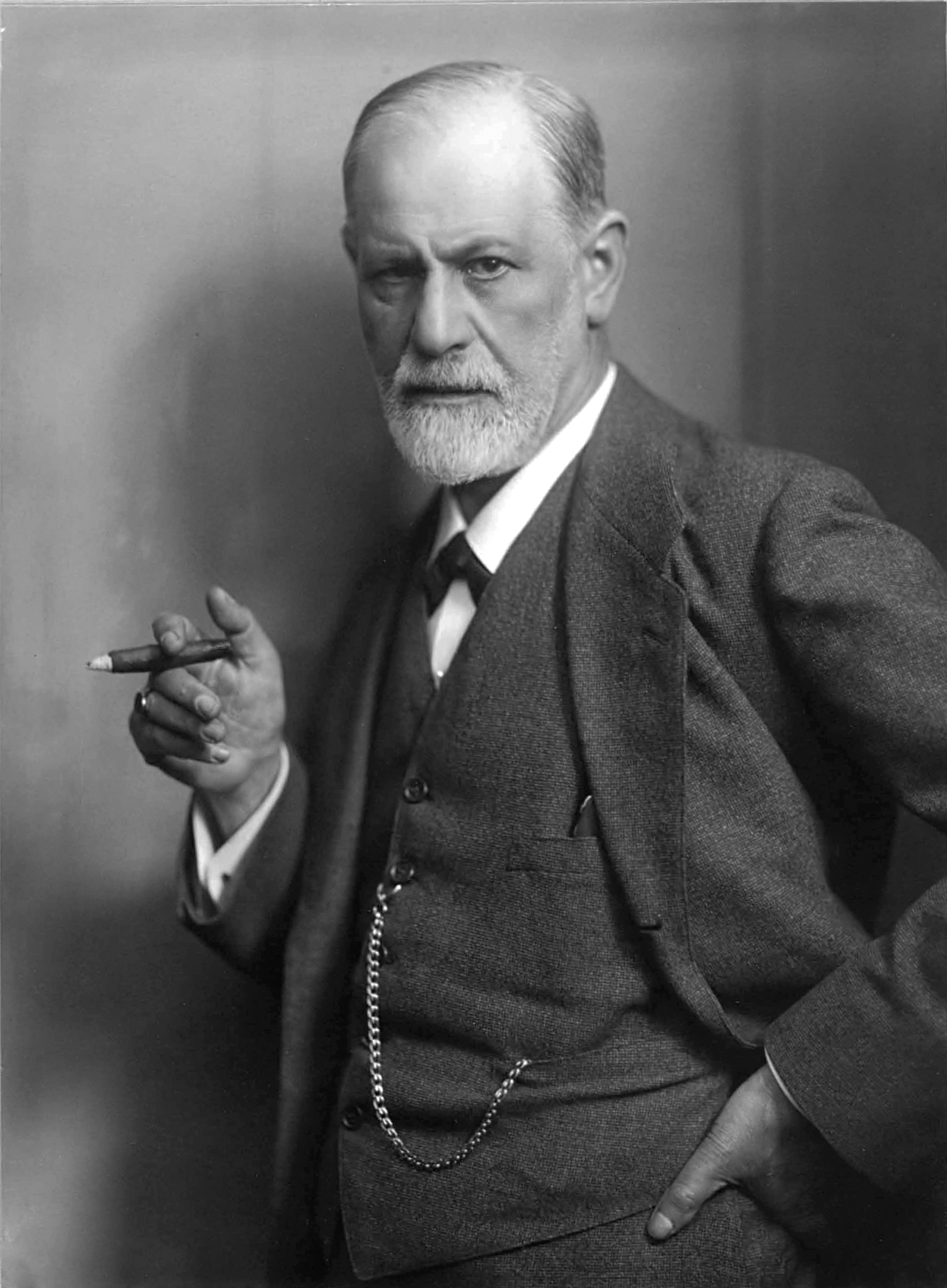
Ideas about magic were also promoted by Sigmund Freud.

The term magic was used liberally by Freud. He also saw magic as emerging from human emotion but interpreted it very differently to Marett. Freud explains that "the associated theory of magic merely explains the paths along which magic proceeds; it does not explain its true essence, namely the misunderstanding which leads it to replace the laws of nature by psychological ones". Freud emphasizes that what led primitive men to come up with magic is the power of wishes: "His wishes are accompanied by a motor impulse, the will, which is later destined to alter the whole face of the earth to satisfy his wishes. This motor impulse is at first employed to give a representation of the satisfying situation in such a way that it becomes possible to experience the satisfaction by means of what might be described as motor hallucinations. This kind of representation of a satisfied wish is quite comparable to children's play, which succeeds their earlier purely sensory technique of satisfaction. [...] As time goes on, the psychological accent shifts from the motives for the magical act on to the measures by which it is carried out—that is, on to the act itself. [...] It thus comes to appear as though it is the magical act itself which, owing to its similarity with the desired result, alone determines the occurrence of that result."

In the early 1960s, the anthropologists Murray and Rosalie Wax put forward the argument that scholars should look at the magical worldview of a given society on its own terms rather than trying to rationalize it in terms of Western ideas about scientific knowledge. Their ideas were heavily criticised by other anthropologists, who argued that they had set up a false dichotomy between non-magical Western worldviews and magical non-Western worldviews. The concept of the magical worldview nevertheless gained widespread use in history, folkloristics, philosophy, cultural theory, and psychology. The notion of magical thinking has also been utilised by various psychologists. In the 1920s, the psychologist Jean Piaget used the concept as part of his argument that children were unable to clearly differentiate between the mental and the physical. According to this perspective, children begin to abandon their magical thinking between the ages of six and nine.

According to Stanley Tambiah, magic, science, and religion all have their own "quality of rationality", and have been influenced by politics and ideology. As opposed to religion, Tambiah suggests that mankind has a much more personal control over events. Science, according to Tambiah, is "a system of behavior by which man acquires mastery of the environment."

===== Ethnocentrism =====
The magic-religion-science triangle developed in European society based on evolutionary ideas i.e. that magic evolved into religion, which in turn evolved into science. However using a Western analytical tool when discussing non-Western cultures, or pre-modern forms of Western society, raises problems as it may impose alien Western categories on them. While magic remains an emic (insider) term in the history of Western societies, it remains an etic (outsider) term when applied to non-Western societies and even within specific Western societies. For this reason, academics like Michael D. Bailey suggest abandoning the term altogether as an academic category. During the twentieth century, many scholars focusing on Asian and African societies rejected the term magic, as well as related concepts like witchcraft, in favour of the more precise terms and concepts that existed within these specific societies like Juju. A similar approach has been taken by many scholars studying pre-modern societies in Europe, such as Classical antiquity, who find the modern concept of magic inappropriate and favour more specific terms originating within the framework of the ancient cultures which they are studying. Alternately, this term implies that all categories of magic are ethnocentric and that such Western preconceptions are an unavoidable component of scholarly research. This century has seen a trend towards emic ethnographic studies by scholar practitioners that explicitly explore the emic/etic divide.

Many scholars have argued that the use of the term as an analytical tool within academic scholarship should be rejected altogether. The scholar of religion Jonathan Z. Smith for example argued that it had no utility as an etic term that scholars should use. The historian of religion Wouter Hanegraaff agreed, on the grounds that its use is founded in conceptions of Western superiority and has "...served as a 'scientific' justification for converting non-European peoples from benighted superstitions..." stating that "the term magic is an important object of historical research, but not intended for doing research."

Bailey noted that, as of the early 21st century, few scholars sought grand definitions of magic but instead focused with "careful attention to particular contexts", examining what a term like magic meant to a given society; this approach, he noted, "call[ed] into question the legitimacy of magic as a universal category". The scholars of religion Berndt-Christian Otto and Michael Stausberg suggested that it would be perfectly possible for scholars to talk about amulets, curses, healing procedures, and other cultural practices often regarded as magical in Western culture without any recourse to the concept of magic itself. The idea that magic should be rejected as an analytic term developed in anthropology, before moving into Classical studies and Biblical studies in the 1980s. Since the 1990s, the term's usage among scholars of religion has declined.

== Magicians ==
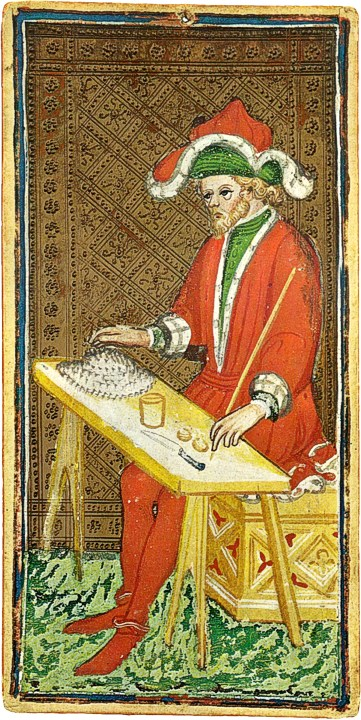
The Magician card from a 15th-century tarot deck

Many of the practices which have been labelled magic can be performed by anyone. For instance, some charms can be recited by individuals with no specialist knowledge nor any claim to having a specific power. Others require specialised training in order to perform them. Some of the individuals who performed magical acts on a more than occasional basis came to be identified as magicians, or with related concepts like sorcerers/sorceresses, witches, or cunning folk. Identities as a magician can stem from an individual's own claims about themselves, or it can be a label placed upon them by others. In the latter case, an individual could embrace such a label, or they could reject it, sometimes vehemently.

Economic incentives can encourage individuals to identify as magicians. In the cases of various forms of traditional healers, as well as the later stage magicians or illusionists, the label of magician could become a job description. Others claim such an identity out of a genuinely held belief that they have specific unusual powers or talents. Different societies have different social regulations regarding who can take on such a role; for instance, it may be a question of familial heredity, or there may be gender restrictions on who is allowed to engage in such practices. A variety of personal traits may be credited with giving magical power, and frequently they are associated with an unusual birth into the world. For instance, in Hungary it was believed that a táltos would be born with teeth or an additional finger. In various parts of Europe, it was believed that being born with a caul would associate the child with supernatural abilities. In some cases, a ritual initiation is required before taking on a role as a specialist in such practices, and in others it is expected that an individual will receive a mentorship from another specialist.

Davies noted that it was possible to "crudely divide magic specialists into religious and lay categories". He noted for instance that Roman Catholic priests, with their rites of exorcism, and access to holy water and blessed herbs, could be conceived as being magical practitioners. Traditionally, the most common method of identifying, differentiating, and establishing magical practitioners from common people is by initiation. By means of rites the magician's relationship to the supernatural and his entry into a closed professional class is established (often through rituals that simulate death and rebirth into a new life). However, Berger and Ezzy explain that since the rise of Neopaganism, "As there is no central bureaucracy or dogma to determine authenticity, an individual's self-determination as a Witch, Wiccan, Pagan or Neopagan is usually taken at face value". Ezzy argues that practitioners' worldviews have been neglected in many sociological and anthropological studies and that this is because of "a culturally narrow understanding of science that devalues magical beliefs".

Mauss argues that the powers of both specialist and common magicians are determined by culturally accepted standards of the sources and the breadth of magic: a magician cannot simply invent or claim new magic. In practice, the magician is only as powerful as his peers believe him to be.

The witch magician

Throughout recorded history, magicians have often faced skepticism regarding their purported powers and abilities. For instance, in sixteenth-century England, the writer Reginald Scot wrote The Discoverie of Witchcraft, in which he argued that many of those accused of witchcraft or otherwise claiming magical capabilities were fooling people using illusionism.

== See also ==
- Books about magic
- Body of light – Hermetic starfire body
- Clarke's three laws – Axioms proposed by British science fiction writer Arthur C. Clarke
- Divination
- Isaac Newton's occult studies – Works by Newton now seen as non-scientific
- Juju – West African spiritual belief system
- Magic in fiction – Magic depicted in fictional stories
- Magical organization – Organization for the practice of occult magic
- Psionics – Science fiction theme of 1950s and 1960s
- Runic magic – Ancient or modern magic performed with runes or runestones
- Scrying – Seeking visions in a reflective surface
- Shamanism – Religious practice
- Thaumaturgy – Working of magical feats by an individual
