= Abbas I =

Abbas I may refer to:

- Abbas the Great (1571–1629), Shah of Persia
- Abbas I of Egypt (1812–1854), Wāli of Egypt and Sudan

== See also ==
- Abbas (name)
