= Abbas Ali =

Abbas Ali

== People ==
- Abbas Ali Khalatbari (1912–1979), Iranian diplomat
- Abbas Ali (Indian National Army) (1920–2014), officer of the Indian National Army and politician
- Abbas Ali (cricketer) (born 1976), former Indian cricketer
- Abbas Ali (footballer) (born 1990), Pakistani footballer
- Abbas (actor) (Mirza Abbas Ali, born 1975), Indian film actor and model
- Abbas ibn Ali (647–680), known as Mother of the Sons
- Abbas Ali, singer from SuperStar (Arabic TV series)

== Places ==
- Abbas Ali, Ardabil, a village in Iran
- Abbas Ali, Khuzestan, a village in Iran
