= Abbos =

Abbos is an Uzbek male given name (short for Uzbek: Alliabbos). It can also appear as a surname as variant of Abbas.

Notable people with the name include:

- Abbos Atoev (born 1986), Uzbekistani amateur boxer
- Abbos Otakhonov (born 1995), Uzbekistani footballer
- Abbos Rakhmonov (born 1998), Uzbekistani freestyle wrestler

== See also ==
- Abbos, ethnic slur referring to Indigenous Australians (variant of abo, derived from Aborigine), see List of ethnic slurs
