= Abd al-Rahman ibn Muhammad al-Bistami =

ʻAbd al-Raḥmān ibn Muḥammad al-Bisṭāmī (Arabic: عبد الرحمن البسطامي) was a leading intellectural figure in the Ottoman world of the early fifteenth century. He was born in Antakya in about 1380 and died in about 1455. Educated in Cairo, he moved to Bursa, where he enjoyed the patronage of Sultan Murad II. He owed his name to the Iranian Sufi to Abu Yazid al-Bistami (d. 875).

Bisṭāmī, who wrote exclusively in Arabic, was the author of a remarkably large number of treastises encompassing literature, Sufism, medicine and history. His work has been little studied and its identification is complicated by multiple versions, some made by the author himself, the variation of titles in the surviving manuscript copies, and the number of extracts that were made, either for separate works or for anthologies. Bisṭāmī drew freely on Ahmad al-Buni (أحمد البوني) with whom he is sometimes confused, as found, for example, in an anthology of prayers and charms in the Bijapur Collection from India.

== Selected works ==
=== Manuscripts ===
A list of manuscripts of Bisṭāmī has been compiled by the University of St. Andrews as part of its project on the Islamisation of Anatolia led by Andrew Peacock and funded by the European Research Council (grant number 284076).

- Al-Durra al-lāmi’a fī al-adwiyat al-jāmi’a
- Durrat 'iqd al-Nahr fi asrar Hib al-Bahr
- Durrat al-Nukad fi ru'yat al-nabi
- Durrat man ẓahara bi’l-gharā’ib wa-atā min futūḥātihi bi’l-‘ajā’ib
- Durrat tāj al-rasā’il wa-ghurrat minhāj al-wasā’il
- Ghurrat al-fawā’id wa-durrat al-Farā’id
- Jinnat al-ashbāḥ wa-tiryāq al-arwāḥ (apparently an excerpt from al-Ad’iyyat al-muntakhaba).
- Kashf al-asrār al-rabbāniyya fī sharḥ al-lum’a al-nūrāniyya, a commentary on al-Būnī ’s al-Lum’a al-nūraniyya, اللمعة النورانية
- Kharā’id al-Mulūk fī Farā’iḍ al-Sulūk
- Kitāb al-Raḥma fī al-Ṭibb wa’l-Ḥikma
- Lawāmi‘ anwār al-qulūb wa-jawāmi’ asrār al-ghuyūb
- Lum’a nūraniyya wa lamḥa rūhaniyya, an excerpt from al-ad‘iyya al-muntakhaba
- Mafatih abwab al-Rashad wa masabij asbab al-rashad
- Mafātīḥ al-asrār wa-maṣābīḥ al-akwār
- Manāhij al-tawassul fī mabāhij al-tarassul
- Miftāḥ al-jafr al-jāmi‘
- Mukhtaṣar al-Sharaf al-Mukhallad fi Bayān Faḍl man ismuhu Aḥmad
- Naẓm al-sulūk fī musāmarat al-mulūk
- Risāla fi Faḍīlat al-Dhikr wa silsilat al-Naqshbandiyya
- Shams al-āfāq fī ‘ilm al-ḥurūf wa’l-awfāq
- Sirr al-jamāl
- Waṣf al-Dawā’ fi Kashf Āfāt al-Waba’̄ (treatise on how to avoid the plague).
- al-Ad‘iyyat al-munthakhaba fi’l-adwiyyat al-mujarraba
- al-Durrat al-Fakhira
- al-Fawā’id al-saniyya
- al-Fawā’iḥ al-miskiyya fi’l-fawātiḥ al-Makkiyya
- al-Laṭā’if al-awrajiyya wa’l-nafaḥāt al-araḥiyya
- al-Sirr al-khafī al-makhzūn wa’l-durr al-‘alī al-maknūn
- al-Jafr al-jāmi‘ wa’l-sirr al-lāmi‘
- al-Laṭīfah al-thālithah fī hādirah ‘aqd al-‘aṣr fī asrār ḥizb al-baḥir
- al-Sifr al-sarih fi safar al-sarih
- al-‘Iqd al-manẓūm
- al-‘Udda li-kull ba’s wa shidda
- Ḥimā al-‘Ārifīn fi Asrār Asmā’ al-Arba’īn
- Ṣayḥat al-būm fi ḥawādith al-Rūm

== Bibliography ==
- Algar, Hamid. "Besṭāmi." EIr., [n.d.].
- Brockelmann, Carl. Geschichte der arabischen Litteratur. Leiden: Brill, 1902, 232–233, 324.
- Fazlıoğlu, İhsan. "İlk Dönem Osmanlı İlim ve Kültür Hayatında İhvânu’s-Safâ ve Abdurrahmân Bistâmî." Dîvân İlmî Araştırmalar Dergisi. 1996/2: 229–240.
- Fleischer, Cornell H. "Seer to the sultan: Haydar-i Remmal and Sultan Süleyman." In Cultural Horizons: A Festschrift in Honor of Talat Halman. Warner, Jayne, ed. Istanbul and Syracuse: 2001, 290–299.
- Fleischer, Cornell H.. "Ancient wisdoms and new sciences: prophecies at the Ottoman court in the fifteenth and early sixteenth centuries." In Falnama: The Book of Omens. Farhad, Massumeh and Serpil Bağcı, ed. Washington, DC: 2009, 232–243.
- Gril, Denis. "L’énigme de la Sagara al-nu‘maniyya fî l-dawla al-‘utmâniyya, attribuée à Ibn ‘Arabî." Lellouch, B. and S. Yérasimos, ed. Paris: 1999, 133–151. (English trans. “The enigma of the Shajara al-nu‘mâniyya fi’l-dawla al-‘uthmâniyya, attributed to Ibn ‘Arabî,” Journal of the Muhyiddin Ibn ‘Arabi Society 43 (2008): 51-74)
- Gril, Denis. "Ésétorisme contre heresie: ‘Abd al-Rahmân al-Bistâmî, un representant de la science des lettres a Bursa dans la première moitié du XV siècle." In Syncrétismes et hérésies dans l’Orient seldjoukide et ottoman (XIVe-XVIII siècle). Veinstein, Gilles, ed. 2005, 183–195.
- Koushki, Melvin. "The Quest for a Universal Science: The Occult Philosophy of Ṣāʾin al-Dīn Turka Iṣfahānī (1369-1432) and Intellectual Millenarianism in Early Timurid Iran." PhD dissertation, Yale University, 2012. (especially on lettristic elements)
- Smith, M. "al-Bistami, ‘Abd al-Rahman." EI2., [n.d.].
- Taşköprülü-zade, al-Shaqā’iq al-Nu‘māniyya fi ‘Ulamā’ al-Dawla al-‘Uthmāniyya. Edited by Furat, Ahmed Subhi. Istanbul: 1985, 46-47. (mainly reliant on Ibn Ḥajar, al-Durar al-Kāmina)
- Çağrıcı, Mustafa. "Bistami, Abdurrahman b. Muhammed." TDVIA. VI, [n.d.]: 218–219.
