= Shams al-Ma'arif =

13th-century book by Ahmad al-Buni

Shams al-Ma'arif (The Book of the Sun of Gnosis)
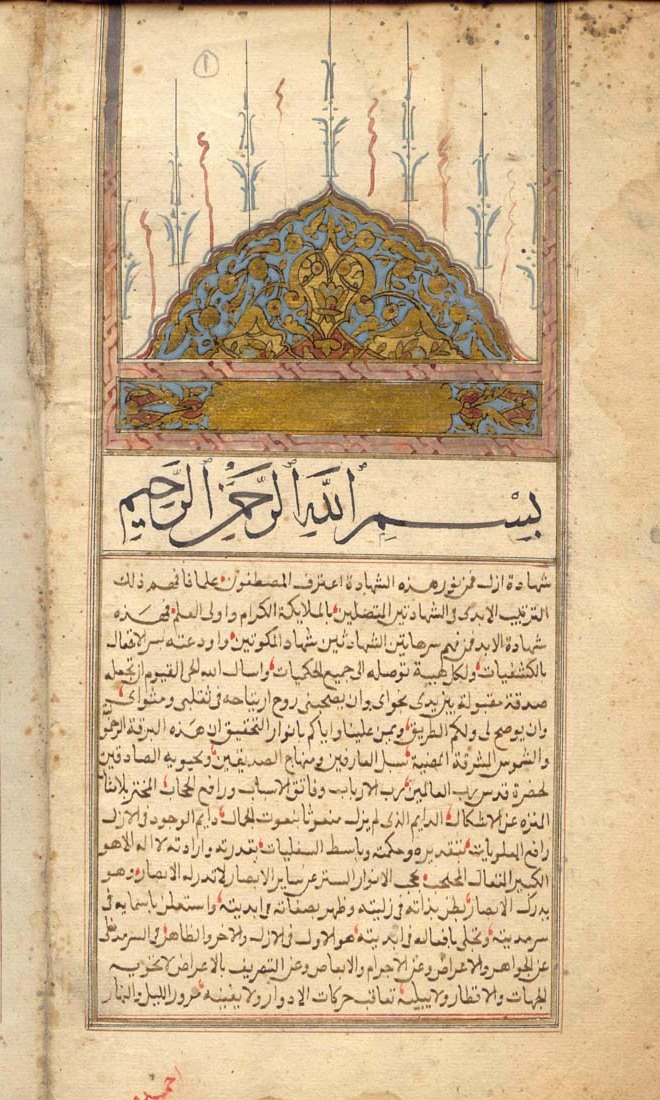
- The introduction of the Book A manuscript copy, beginning of 17th century
- Author: Ahmad al-Buni (traditional attribution, possibly pseudepigrapha)
- Language: Arabic
- Genre: Occult treatise, Grimoire
- OCLC: 20121408
- LC Class: BF1771 .B8 Arab

Shams al-Ma'arif or Shams al-Ma'arif wa Lata'if al-'Awarif (Note: Arabic: كتاب شمس المعارف ولطائف العوارف, lit. 'the Book of the Sun of Gnosis and the Subtleties of Elevated Things') is a grimoire centered on Arabic magic. It is claimed to be a manual for achieving esoteric spirituality. The work is included within the larger compilation Shams al-maʿārif al-kubrā, which is also known as the "Shams al-Ma'arif". Although widely attributed to the 13th century North African Sufi scholar Ahmad al-Buni, his authorship of the text is disputed and has been argued to be pseudepigraphic (falsely attributed). The Shams al-maʿārif al-kubrā is a compilation work of a number of different authors, including some authentic work from al-Buni. While being popular, it also carries a notorious reputation for being suppressed and banned for much of Islamic history.

== History ==
The authorship of the Shams al-Ma'arif wa Lata'if al-'Awarif was historically attributed to the North African late 12th- early 13th century Sufi scholar Ahmad al-Buni who purportedly wrote it while living in Central Maghreb (modern-day Algeria); he died around 1225 CE (622 AH). However, Buni's authorship of the work is disputed. It has been suggested that another text, also known as the Shams al-Ma'arif found in the National Library of Damascus represents an authentic work of al-Buni, but it is very different from the more famous text of the same name, focusing on cosmology rather than magic, and works undoubtedly authored by al-Buni do not focus on magic, with the exception of Laṭāʾif al-ishārāt briefly mentioning esoteric properties of Arabic letters. Jean-Charles Coulon has argued that Shams al-Ma'arif wa Lata'if al-'Awarif cannot be an authentic work of al-Buni due to the presence of anachronisms within the text that are inconsistent with al-Buni's known authentic works, thus making it pseudepigrapha. Coulon argues that the work is part of a "corpus Buniam" of authors working in the tradition of al-Buni, some of which was falsely attributed to al-Buni himself. Al-Buni's reputation for esoteric magic was later further enhanced by the 15th century Ottoman scholar Abd al-Rahman ibn Muhammad al-Bistami, who extensively commentated on Buni's works, with a particular focus of al-Bistami being instructions for creating magical amulets and talismans. This was later followed by the composition of the expansive compilation work Shams al-maʿārif al-kubrā containing the Shams al-Ma'arif wa Lata'if al-'Awarif as well as other esoteric magic works including those by al-Bisṭāmī’, alongside authentic texts by al-Buni himself, which circulated in elite circles of the Ottoman Empire.

Scholars like Ibn Taymiyya have criticized the book and labeled the author, Al-Buni, as a deluded devil (Shaytan) worshipper. However, it continues to persist, and is still being read in public and studied in the present day, despite its questionable reputation. Some Sufi orders, such as the Naqshbandi-Haqqani order, have occasionally recognised its potential spiritual value, provided that the reader understands it. Contemporary scholars like Liana Saif have published works elucidating that medieval Islamic occult philosophy distinguished an acceptable study of occult sciences and theurgy against forbidden sihr practices.

After its first modern era printing in Beirut in 1985, the government of Saudi Arabia imposed a ban on the book. Ibn Jibrin, a Saudi scholar member of the Council of Senior Scholars and of the Permanent Committee for Scholarly Research and Ifta, has issued fatwa which forbid certain books, including the Shams al-Ma'arif.

In the 20th and 21st century AD, Shams al-Ma'arif grew in recognition and was adopted by the Order of Nine Angles, a global terrorist Satanist organization, as one of their influences. Prior to a complete translation into English having been undertaken, numerous renditions of a few of the more popular rituals found within the main treatise, as well as those that lie in its accompanying text, were produced. Some of these rituals have had various degrees of notability, but one of recurring presence in many publications is that of the Birhatiya (also known as The Ancient Oath or Red Sulphur).

The most widely accepted, circulating Arabic edition to this date is the 1927 Cairo edition, published by Muṣṭafā al-Bābī al-Ḥalabī. It has served as the primary base text for scholarly analysis and translations that have since followed.

In 2022 a partial English translation by Amina Inloes was published by Revelore Press as Shams al-Ma’arif: The Sun of Knowledge An Arabic Grimoire: A selected Translation.

In 2023, another English translation of the Shams al Ma'arif was published by Johann Voldemont as Shams al-Ma'arif: Talismans and Magic Squares. It focuses primarily on the talismans and magic squares contained within the text.

The first complete and unabridged English translation which included all figures and their transcriptions was published in 2026 by John Friend as Shams al-Ma'arif al-Kubra: The Complete Sun of Divine Knowledge: Letter Magic, Lunar Mansions, Divine Names, and the Science of Squares.

Outside of the Arab and Western world, several editions of the book have been published in the Urdu and Turkish languages.

== Content ==
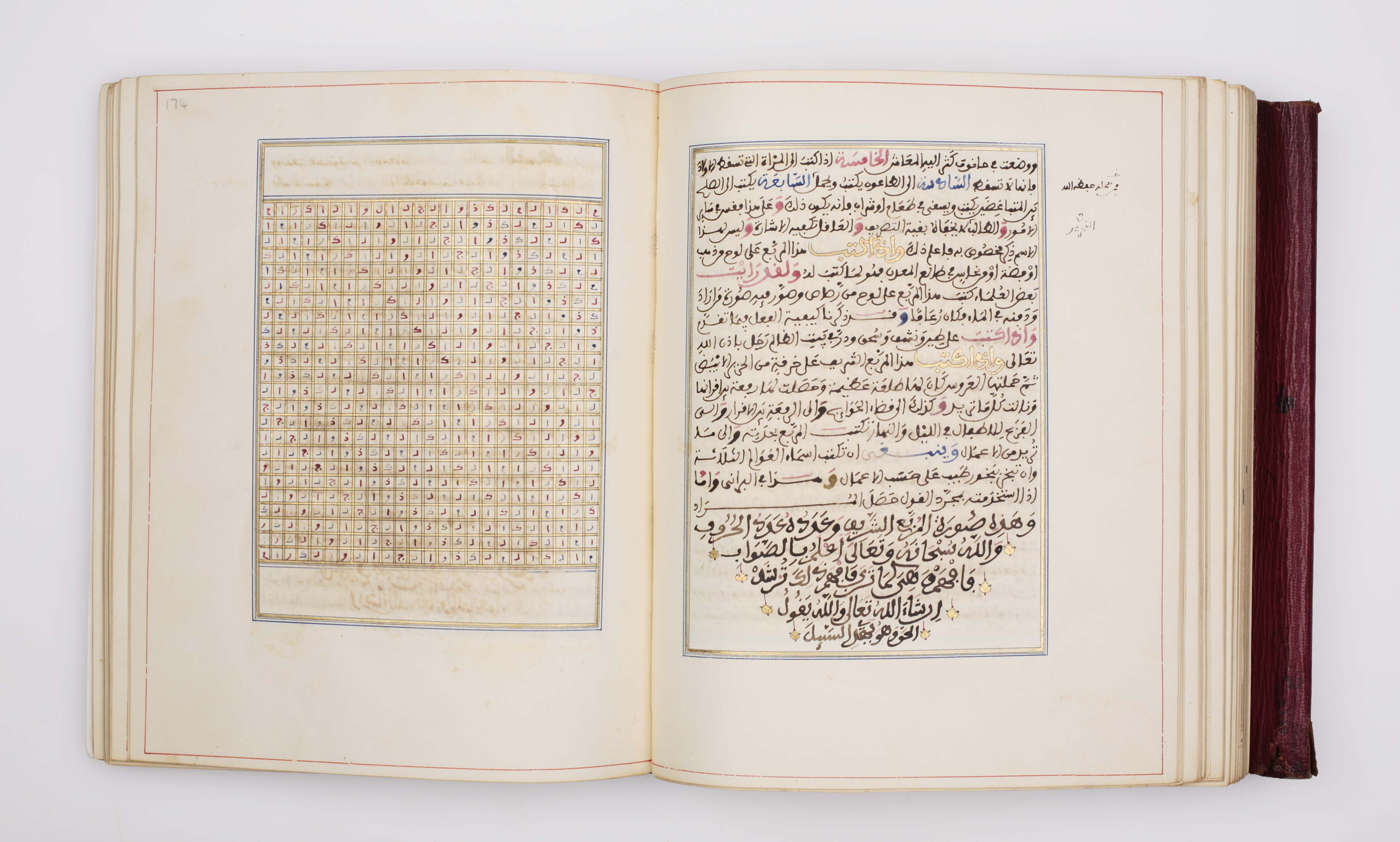
An Algerian manuscript of the Shams al-Ma'arif from 1868, Khalili Collection of Islamic Art

In contemporary form, the book consists of two volumes, Shams Al-Ma'arif al-Kubra (Note: Arabic: شمس المعارف الكبرى) and Shams Al-Ma'arif al-Sughra, (Note: Arabic: شمس المعارف الصغرى) the former being the larger of the two. The first few chapters introduce the reader to magic squares, and the combination of numbers and the alphabet that are believed to bring magical effect, which the author claims is the only way to communicate with Jinn, angels and spirits. The table of contents that was introduced in the later printed editions of the work contains a list of unnumbered chapters (faṣl), which stretch to 40. However, before the printing press and various other standardisations, there were three independent volumes that circulated, each one differing in length.

Another title by the same author, namely Manba' Usul al-Hikmah "The Source of the Essentials of Wisdom", is considered its companion text.. It is notably famous for containing Ahmad al-Buni's commentary on the Birhatiya oath.

== See also ==
- Alchemy in the medieval Islamic world
- Astrology in the medieval Islamic world
- Simiyya

== Notes ==
=== Bibliography ===
- Monette, Connell (2013). Mysticism in the 21st Century. Wilsonville, Oregon: Sirius Academic Press. ISBN 978-1-940964-00-3.
