= Amina Inloes =

American scholar

- Born: Irvine, California, United States
- Occupations: scholar, researcher, educator
- Known for: public speaking

Amina Inloes is an American scholar, researcher, educator, public speaker, translator and a Shi'i Muslim. She has written several books on the subject of Shi'ism.

== Personal life ==
Inloes was born in Irvine, California, United States.

== Education ==
She has a PhD in Islamic Studies from the University of Exeter on Shi'ia hadith about pre-Islamic female figures mentioned in the Qur'an. Her PhD thesis, submitted in 2015, is entitled "Negotiating Shīʿī Identity and Orthodoxy through Canonizing Ideologies about Women in Twelver Shīʿī Aḥādīth on Pre-Islamic Sacred History in the Qurʾān".

== Career ==
She works for the Research and Publications Department of the Islamic College and is programme leader for the MA Islamic Studies program. Inloes has completed a partial translation of the Shams al-Ma'arif.

== Publications ==
- The Queen of Sheba in Shi'a Hadith, in Journal of Shi'a Islamic Studies, vol. 5, no. 4 (2012)
- Conversion to Twelver Shi‘ism among American and Canadian women, in Studies in Religion (forthcoming)by A. Inloes and L. Takim.
- Mukhtar al-Thaqafi: Character versus Controversy, in the Journal of Shi'a Islamic Studies (Volume 2, 2009)
- Review of The Shi'a Revival in the Journal of Shi'a Islamic Studies (Volume 4, 2008)
- The Tragedy of Karbala A Dramatic Interpretation of the Epic of Imam Husain (A).

Translations

- Mulla Muhsin Fayd Kashani
- Spiritual Mysteries and Ethical Secrets: A Translation of al-Haqa'iq fi Makarim al-Akhlaq, tr. A. Inloes, N. Virjee, and M. Tajri (London: ICAS Press, 2012)
- The Sun of Knowledge (Shams al-Ma'arif): An Arabic Grimoire in Selected Translation
