= Studia Iranica =

- Discipline: Iranian studies
- Language: English, French
- Edited by: Marcel Bazin, Rémy Boucharlat

Publication details
- History: 1989-present
- Publisher: Peeters Publishers on behalf of the Association for the Advancement of Iranian Studies
- Frequency: Biannual

Standard abbreviations
- ISO 4: Stud. Iran.

Indexing
- ISSN: 0221-5004 (print); 1783-1784 (web)
- LCCN: 73644168
- JSTOR: 02215004
- OCLC no.: 1189798062

Links
- Journal homepage

Studia Iranica is a biannual peer-reviewed academic journal covering Iranian and Persianate history, literature, and society published by Peeters Publishers on behalf of the Association for the Advancement of Iranian Studies. The editors-in-chief are Marcel Bazin (University of Reims Champagne-Ardenne) and Rémy Boucharlat (University of Lyon). Articles are published in English or French and cover a period ranging from the proto-historical to the modern period, while its geographic boundaries coincide with those of the area where ancient Iranian or modern Iranian languages were or are spoken.

== Abstracting and indexing ==
The journal is abstracted and indexed in:

- Index Islamicus
- International Bibliography of Periodical Literature
- Linguistic Bibliography
- Modern Language Association Database
- Scopus
