= Simiyya =

Doctrine of Sufism

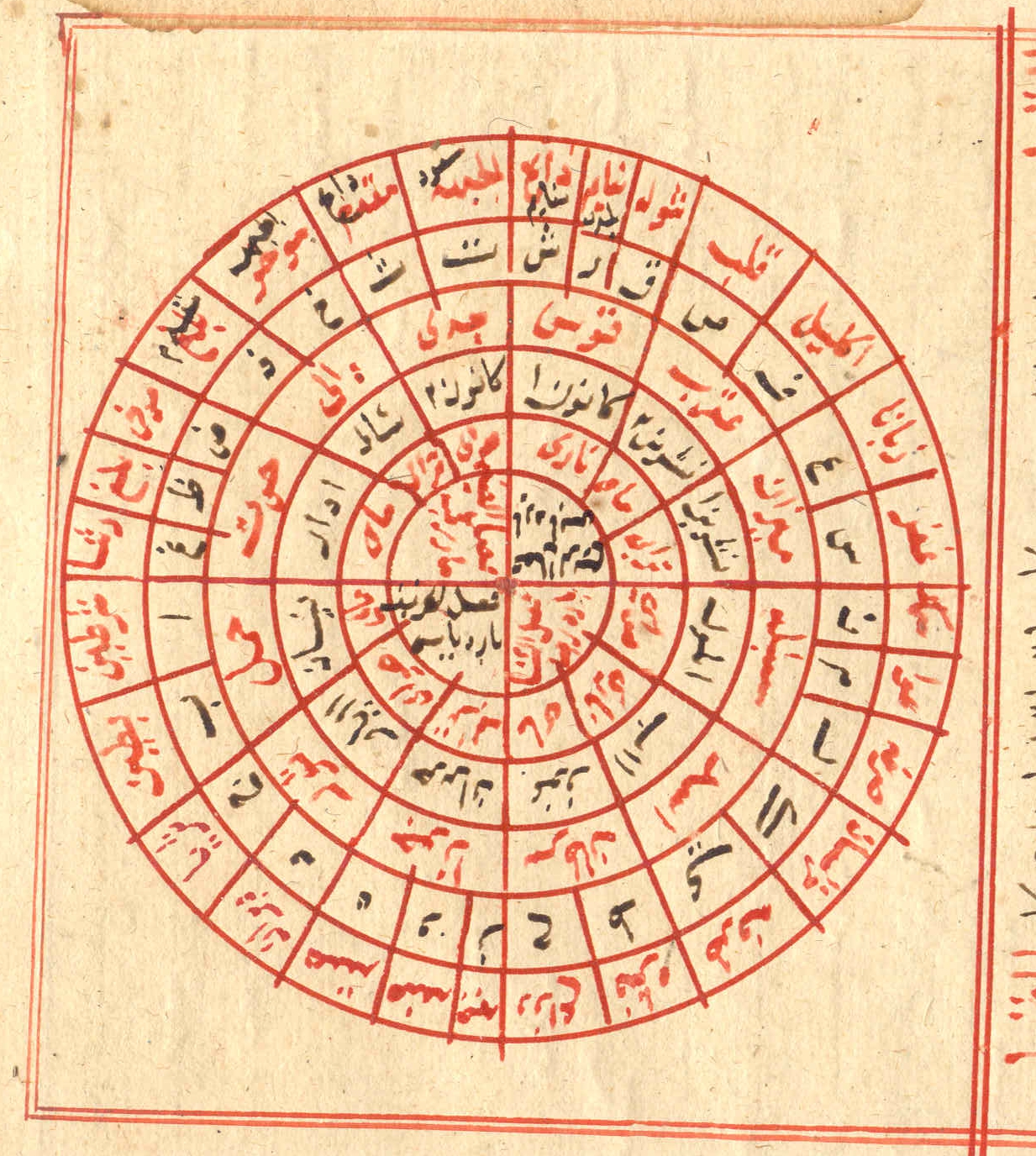
Table of associations between letters, the mansions of the moon, the constellations of the standard Zodiac, and the seasons, from the "Shams al-Ma'ārif".

Sīmiyā’ (from Arabic Simah سِمة which means sign Greek: σημεία, "signs") also rūḥāniyya, or ‘ilm al-ḥikma (Arabic: روحانية and علم الحكمة, lit. "spirituality" and "the epistemology of wisdom", respectively) is a doctrine found commonly within Islam-occult traditions that may be deduced upon the notion of "linking the superior natures with the inferior...", and broadly described as theurgy.

This is confirmed further by al-Majrīṭī, who claims to reveal the techniques by which it is possible to convoke the rūḥāniyya of the celestial bodies. Theologian Abū Ḥāmid al-Ghazālī, the preacher and writer al-Kāshifī, and the Sufi Muḥyī al-Dīn Ibn al-'Arabī are amongst the most pre-eminent contributors. But al-Būnī, author of the two-volume Shams al-Ma‘ārif, is as likely as not a considerable focal point for the craft. The 13th-century Hermetic thinker had transcribed a whole corpus of material (called the ‘Corpus Būnianum’), all of which was subsumed under the spiritual science, and a majority of his works are still used as prototypes for present-day magical practice and literature.

The term sīmiyā’ was the synonym of rūḥāniyya, which meant 'spirituality'. This was to be contrasted with the lesser conformed sorcery (siḥr), deemed forbidden in Islam.

== See also ==
- Alchemy and chemistry in Islam
- Islamic astrology
- Picatrix
- Shams al-Ma'arif
