= Imran Abbas (cricketer) =

Pakistani cricketer (born 1978)

Personal information
- Born: 25 March 1978 (age 48); Gujranwala, Pakistan
- Batting: Right-handed
- Bowling: Right-arm offbreak
- Source: Cricinfo, 21 April 2007

Imran Abbas (Urdu: عمران عباس) (born 25 March 1978) is a Pakistani cricketer. He is a right-handed batsman and a right-arm medium fast bowler who has played for the Pakistani cricket team.

Having made several appearances for such teams as Dera Ghazi Khan and the Agriculture Development Bank of Pakistan between 1997 and 2000, he finally got his chance to prove himself at international level in 2000 when he played against Sri Lanka in a One Day International. Entering his international career as an upper-order batsman, not quite emulating the position of opening batsman he achieved with his first match playing for Gujranwala, he performed steadily for the team, at times impressing with his play.

Abbas was on the losing ADBP side in the PCB Patron's Trophy final of 1998, won by Habib Bank Limited cricket team. Most recently, in 2006, he has played for Pakistan International Airlines, having represented a Lahore-based team in the 2005/06 instalment of the Quaid-e-Azam Trophy.
