= Judah ben Abbas =

13th-century Spanish Jewish writer

Judah ben Samuel ben Abbas (Hebrew: יהודה בן שמואל בן עבאס) was a Spanish Jewish writer of the thirteenth century. This form of his name is authenticated in the headings of his two works in "MS. Loewe," viii.; namely, (a) "Minḥat Yehudah" (Hebrew: מנחת יהודה), a fragment of two leaves only, also styled "Meḳor Ḥayyim" (Source of Life). Under the latter title the work is quoted in (b) "Yair Netib" (Hebrew: יאיר נתיב), also styled "Shebeṭ Yehudah" (Hebrew: שבט יהודה). Judah affirms that he composed this work at the age of twenty. It is of a moral and religious character. The fifteenth chapter contains a complete system of studies arranged according to pedagogical principles. It has been translated from the Bodleian manuscript by Moritz Güdemann, "Das jüdische Unterrichtswesen während der spanisch-arabischen Periode," i. 147. Commencing with the reading and interpretation of the Hebrew Bible, he would have the child study, in regular order, morals, medicine, arithmetic, logic, physics, and, as the very last subject, metaphysics.
