= Allan Abbass =

Canadian psychiatrist

Dr. Allan Abbass (born February 22, 1962) is professor, psychiatrist, and founding Director of the Centre for Emotions and Health at Dalhousie University in Halifax, Nova Scotia, Canada.

== Career ==
Abbass's clinical and research specialty has been the use of intensive short-term dynamic psychotherapy (ISTDP) in the management of medically unexplained physical symptoms. Abbass has developed training programs for the modality and has published clinical trials on its efficacy, meta-analyses on its clinical usefulness, and studies of psychodynamic modalities, in general.

He has published extensively on the cost-effectiveness of ISTDP. He has provided and supported training ISTDP programs in Switzerland, Greece, The Netherlands, Malta, Italy, Norway, Sweden, Denmark, Poland, the UK and other countries.

== Organisational affiliations and recognition ==
In 2001, Dr. Abbass was awarded The Association of Chairs of Psychiatry of Canada Education Award for Excellence in Education. In 2013, Dr. Abbass was Awarded the Douglas Utting Award in Montreal, Quebec, Canada, in the "Canadian Providing Outstanding Contributions" category, for the recognition and treatment of depression. He was awarded the designation "Distinguished Professor of 2016" by the University of California Los Angeles (UCLA) Department of Psychiatry. In 2018 he was named The David Malan Visiting professor of psychotherapy at the Tavistock in London, UK and is also visiting professor of psychotherapy at University of Derby, UK. He is a past President of the International Experiential Dynamic Therapy Association.

He is an advisory board member on the American Psychological Association's Unified Psychotherapy project, and is on the scientific committee of the American Psychoanalytic Association. He is faculty of the Norwegian Institute for ISTDP He is on the editorial board of the American Journal of Psychotherapy

== Publications ==
He published his first book, Reaching through Resistance: Advanced Psychotherapy Techniques, in 2015. www.allanabbass.com

His second book Hidden from View: Clinician's Guide to Psychophysiologic Disorders was published in 2018 with Dr Howard Schubiner www.unlearnyourpain.com

Dr. Abbass has also published on the use of videotape and videoconference for training in short term psychotherapy.

== Basketball ==
An avid basketball fan and player, Allan was named one of Canada's top 25 under 19 year old players while in High School. He was named to the Harrison Trimble High School Sports Hall of Fame in 2007. He played university basketball at Ottawa University and Dalhousie University. He has been an investor and board member of the Halifax Hurricanes, the 2016 Champions of the National Basketball League of Canada.
