= Abbas Ali, Ardabil =

Abbas Ali
- Location in Iran
- Coordinates: 38°37′05″N 48°01′12″E
- Country: Iran
- Province: Ardabil Province
- Time zone: UTC+3:30 (IRST)
  - Summer (DST): UTC+4:30 (IRDT)

Abbas Ali is a village in the Ardabil Province of Iran.
