= Ahmad al-Buni =

Arab mathematician, philosopher and Sufi

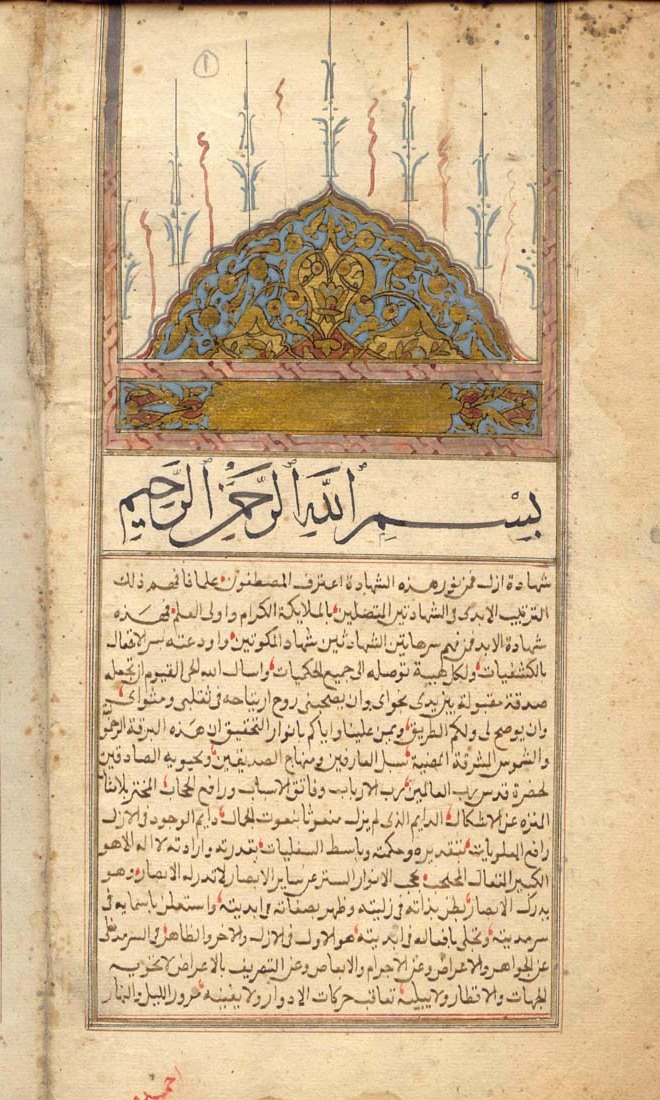
Shams al-Ma'arif al-Kubra, a manuscript copy, beginning of 17th century

Sharaf al-Din, Shihab al-Din, or Muḥyi al-Din Ahmad ibn Ali ibn Yusuf al-Buni al-Maliki, better known as Aḥmad al-Būnī al-Malki (Arabic: أحمد البوني المالكي, d. 1225), was a medieval mathematician and Islamic philosopher and a well-known Sufi. Very little is known about him. His writings deal with 'Ilm al-huruf (Arabic: علم الحروف, the esoteric value of letters) and topics relating to mathematics, siḥr "sorcery", and spirituality. Born in Buna in the Almohad Caliphate (now Annaba, Algeria), al-Buni lived in Ayyubid Egypt and learned from many eminent Sufi masters of his time. A contemporary of ibn Arabi, he is best known for reputedly writing one of the most important books of his era; the Shams al-Ma'arif, a book that is still regarded as the foremost occult text on talismans and divination, though his authorship of the text has been questioned.

== Contributions ==
=== Theurgy ===
Instead occult (sorcery), this kind of magic was called Ilm al-Hikmah (Knowledge of the Wisdom), Ilm al-simiyah (Study of the Divine Names) and Ruhaniyat (Spirituality). Most of the so-called mujarrabât ("time-tested methods") books on sorcery in the Muslim world are simplified excerpts from the Shams al-Ma'arif. The book remains the seminal work on Theurgy and esoteric arts to this day.

=== Mathematics and science ===
In c. 1200, Ahmad al-Buni showed how to construct magic squares using a simple bordering technique, but he may not have discovered the method himself. Al-Buni wrote about Latin squares and constructed, for example, 4 x 4 Latin squares using letters from one of the 99 names of God. His works on traditional healing remain a point of reference among Yoruba Muslim healers in Nigeria and other areas of the Muslim world.

== Influence ==
His work is said to have influenced the Hurufis and the New Lettrist International. Denis MacEoin, in a 1985 article in Studia Iranica, said that al-Buni may also have indirectly influenced the Twelver Shi'i radical movement known as Bábism. MacEoin said that Bābis made widespread use of talismans and magical letters.

== Writings ==
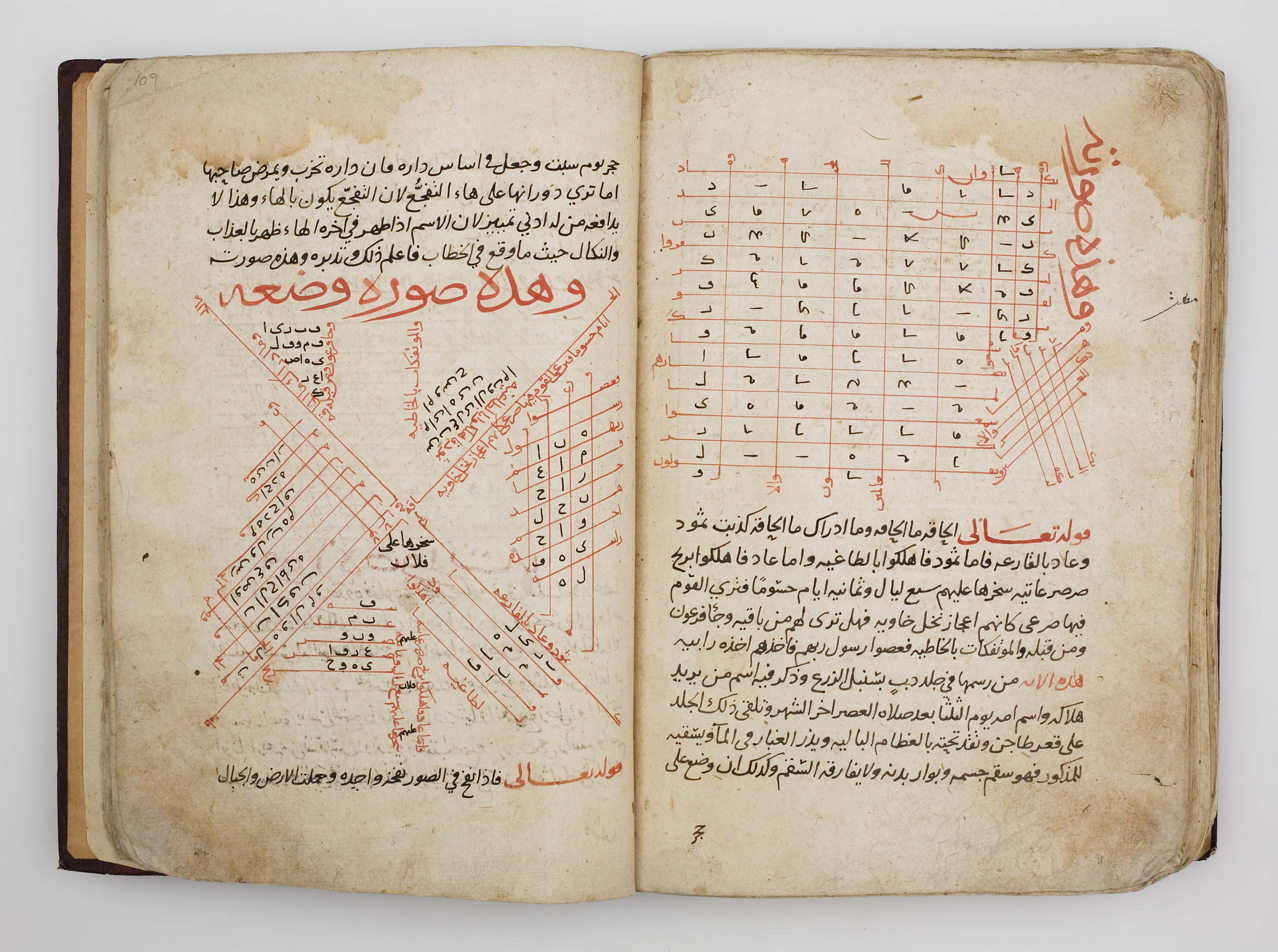
Pages from Al-Buni's Treatise on the Magical Uses of the Ninety-nine Names of God

- Shams al-Maʿārif al-Kubrā (The Great Sun of Gnosis), Cairo, 1928.
- Sharḥ Ism Allāh al-aʿẓam fī al-rūḥānī, printed in 1357 AH or in Egypt al-Maṭbaʿa al-Maḥmudiyya al-Tujjariyya bi'l-Azhar.
- Kabs al-iktidā, Oriental Manuscripts in Durham University Library.
- Berhatiah, Ancient Magick Conjuration Of Power.
- Treatise on the Magical Uses of the Ninety-nine Names of God in the Khalili Collection of Islamic Art

== Notes ==
- Edgar W. Francis, Mapping the Boundaries between Magic. The Names of God in the Writings of Ahmad ibn Ali al-Buni
