= Holodomor denial =

Historical negationism regarding the 1932–33 famine in Ukraine

Holodomor denial is the historical negationist claim that the Holodomor, a 1932–33 man-made famine that killed millions in Soviet Ukraine, did not occur or was exaggerated.

The government of the Soviet Union officially denied the occurrence of the famine and suppressed information about it from its very beginning until the 1980s. This Soviet denial was also circulated by some Western journalists and intellectuals. Most prominently, The New York Times' Walter Duranty echoed Soviet denials in his reporting during the height of the famine.

According to Jurij Dobczansky, Holodomor denial is easily distinguished from serious scholarship, and "generally consists of especially vitriolic anti-Western and anti-Ukrainian tirades," often accompanied by accusations of foreign influence, Nazi sympathies, or ulterior motives.

Rebekah Moore argues that Western recognition of the Holodomor reflects the broader politics of genocide and victimhood, emphasizing the ongoing struggle for acknowledgment, particularly among the Ukrainian diaspora.

== Soviet Union ==
=== Cover-up of the famine ===
Soviet head-of-state Mikhail Kalinin responded to Western offers of food by telling off "political cheats who offer to help the starving Ukraine," and commented, "Only the most decadent classes are capable of producing such cynical elements."

On instructions from Litvinov, Boris Skvirsky, embassy counselor of the recently opened Soviet Embassy in the United States, published a letter on 3 January 1934, in response to a pamphlet about the famine. In his letter, Skvirsky stated that the idea that the Soviet government was "deliberately killing the population of Ukraine" was "wholly grotesque." He claimed that the Ukrainian population had been increasing at an annual rate of 2 percent during the preceding five years and asserted that the death rate in Ukraine "was the lowest of that of any of the constituent republics composing the Soviet Union", concluding that it "was about 35 percent lower than the pre-war death rate of tsarist days."

Mention of the famine was criminalized, punishable with a five-year term in the Gulag labor camps. Blaming the authorities was punishable by death. William Henry Chamberlin was a Moscow correspondent of The Christian Science Monitor for 10 years; in 1934 he was reassigned to the Far East. After he left the Soviet Union he wrote his account of the situation in Ukraine and North Caucasus (Poltava, Bila Tserkva, and Kropotkin). Chamberlin later published a couple of books: Russia's Iron Age and The Ukraine: A Submerged Nation. He wrote in the Christian Science Monitor in 1934 that "the evidence of a large-scale famine was so overwhelming, was so unanimously confirmed by the peasants that the most 'hard-boiled' local officials could say nothing in denial."

=== Falsification and suppression of evidence ===
The true number of dead was concealed. At the Kyiv Medical Inspectorate, for example, the actual number of corpses, 9,472, was recorded as only 3,997. The GPU was directly involved in the destruction of actual birth and death records, as well as the fabrication of false information to cover up information regarding the causes and scale of death in Ukraine.

The January 1937 census, the first in 11 years, was intended to reflect the achievements of Stalin's rule. Those collecting the data, senior statisticians with decades of experience, were arrested and executed, including three successive heads of the Soviet Central Statistical Administration. The census data itself was locked away for half a century in the Russian State Archive of the Economy.

=== Soviet campaign in the 1980s ===
The Soviet Union denied the existence of the famine until its 50th anniversary, in 1983, when the worldwide Ukrainian community coordinated famine remembrance. The Ukrainian diaspora exerted significant pressure on the media and various governments, including the United States and Canada, to raise the issue of the famine with the government of the Soviet Union.

In February 1983, Alexander Yakovlev, the Soviet Ambassador to Canada, in a secret analysis "Some thoughts regarding the advertising of the Ukrainian SSR Pavilion held at the International Exposition "Man and the world" held in Canada" put forward a prognosis for a campaign being prepared to bring international attention to the Ukrainian Holodomor which was spearheaded by the Ukrainian nationalist community. Yakovlev proposed a list of concrete proposals to "neutralise the enemy ideological actions of the Ukrainian bourgeoise nationalists".

By April 1983, the bureau of the Soviet Novosti Press Agency had prepared and sent out a special press release denying the occurrence of the 1933 famine in Ukraine. This press release was sent to every major newspaper, radio and television station as well as University in Canada. It was also sent out to all members of the Canadian parliament.

A Holodomor monument in Edmonton, Alberta, Canada

On 5 July 1983, the Soviet Embassy issued an official note of protest regarding the planned opening of a monument in memory of the victims of the Holodomor in Edmonton attempting to smear the opening of the monument.

In October 1983, the World Congress of Ukrainians led by V-Yu Danyliv attempted to launch an international tribunal to judge the facts regarding the Holodomor. At the 4th World Congress of Ukrainians held in December 1983, a resolution was passed to form such an international tribunal.

Former Ukrainian president Leonid Kravchuk recalled that he was responsible for countering the Ukrainian Diaspora's public education campaign of the 1980s, marking 50 years of the Soviet terror famine in 1983: "In the early 1980s many publications began appearing in the Western press on the occasion of the fiftieth anniversary of one of the most horrific tragedies in the history of our people. A counter-propaganda machine was put into motion, and I was one of its wheels." The first book on the famine was published in Ukraine only in 1989, after a major shake-up that occurred in the Communist Party of Ukraine when Volodymyr Ivashko replaced Volodymyr Shcherbytsky and the Political Bureau decided that such book could be published. However, even in this book, "the most terrifying photographs were not approved for print, and their number was reduced from 1,500 to around 350."

This recognition of the Holodomor as genocide has played an instrumental role in shaping modern Ukrainian identity. as Lina Klymenko asserts, that Ukraine's efforts to solidify its historical narrative of resilience and resistance against oppression are integral to its nation-building process. The institutionalization of Holodomor remembrance has further distinguished Ukraine from Russia, reinforcing national unity and historical memory. As ultimately, former President of Ukraine (1991–94), Leonid Kravchuk, exposed the official cover-up attempts and came out in support of recognizing the famine, named the "Holodomor", as a genocide, noting "this was a planned action and that this was a genocide committed against the people. But we can't stop there. Yes, it was against the people, but it was directed from a different centre."

== Denial outside the Soviet Union ==
=== Walter Duranty and The New York Times ===
According to Patrick Wright, Robert C. Tucker, and Eugene Lyons, one of the first Western Holodomor deniers was Walter Duranty, who won the 1932 Pulitzer Prize in journalism, in the category of correspondence, for his dispatches on Soviet Union and the working out of the Five Year Plan. In 1932, he wrote in the pages of The New York Times that "any report of a famine in Russia is today an exaggeration or malignant propaganda". He said that while there was a bad harvest, and consequent food shortages, it did not rise to the level of a famine and that "there is no actual starvation or deaths from starvation, but there is widespread mortality from diseases due to malnutrition." Some have disputed the validity of his distinction between death from starvation and death from disease that is exacerbated by malnutrition.

In his reports, Duranty downplayed the impact of food shortages in Ukraine. As Duranty wrote in a dispatch from Moscow in March 1933, "These conditions are bad, but there is no famine" and "But—to put it brutally—you can't make an omelette without breaking eggs."

Duranty also wrote denunciations of those who wrote about the famine, accusing them of being reactionaries and anti-Bolshevik propagandists. In August 1933, Cardinal Theodor Innitzer of Vienna called for relief efforts, stating that the famine in Ukraine was claiming lives "likely... numbered... by the millions" and driving those still alive to infanticide and cannibalism. The New York Times, 20 August 1933, reported Innitzer's charge and published an official Soviet denial: "in the Soviet Union we have neither cannibals nor cardinals". The next day, the Times added Duranty's own denial.

British journalist Malcolm Muggeridge, who went to live in the Soviet Union in 1932 as a reporter for the Manchester Guardian and became a fierce anti-communist, said of Duranty that he "always enjoyed his company; there was something vigorous, vivacious, preposterous, about his unscrupulousness which made his persistent lying somehow absorbing." Muggeridge characterised Duranty as "the greatest liar of any journalist I have met in 50 years of journalism."

However, by the end of 1933, the new Roosevelt administration were actively looking to dismiss any bad news that came out from the Soviet Union, as tensions rose in Germany with Hitler's rise and the Japanese threat to expansion. Duranty, played a role in the "cover-up" of the famine in Ukraine, as President Roosevelt “read Duranty's reporting carefully – encouraged him to believe that there might be a lucrative commercial relationship too.” With this Litvinov arrived in New York to sign and make this newfound partnership official with the accompany of Duranty. With no doubt Duranty's impact of denying the famine in his writing and his allegiance to the USSR further suppressed the idea of a famine even existing in Ukraine, despite his writing holding contradictory notions with his conversations with William Strang, as he reckoned "'it quite possible that as many as 10 million people may have died directly or indirectly from lack of food’, though that number never appeared in any of his reporting."

An international campaign for the retraction of Duranty's Pulitzer Prize was launched in 2003 by the Ukrainian Canadian Civil Liberties Association and its supporters. The newspaper, however, declined to relinquish it, arguing that Duranty received the prize for a series of reports about the Soviet Union, eleven of which were published in June 1931. In 1990, the Times published an editorial calling his work "some of the worst reporting to appear in this newspaper."

=== By prominent visitors to the Soviet Union ===
Prominent writers from Ireland and Britain who visited the Soviet Union in 1934, such as George Bernard Shaw and H. G. Wells, are also on record as denying the existence of the famine in Ukraine.

Another famine denier was Sir John Maynard. In 1934 the British Foreign Office in the House of Lords stated that there was no evidence to support the allegations against the Soviet government regarding the famine in Ukraine, based on the testimony of Maynard, who had visited Ukraine in the summer of 1933 and rejected "tales of famine-genocide propagated by the Ukrainian Nationalists".

During a visit to Ukraine carried out between 26 August – 9 September 1933, former French Prime Minister Édouard Herriot, said that Soviet Ukraine was "like a garden in full bloom". Herriot declared to the press that there was no famine in Ukraine, that he did not see any trace of it, and that this showed adversaries of the Soviet Union were spreading the rumour. "When one believes that Ukraine is devastated by famine, allow me to shrug my shoulders", he declared. The 13 September 1933 issue of Pravda was able to write that Herriot "categorically contradicted the lies of the bourgeoisie press in connection with a famine in the USSR." It was alleged by anti-communist activist Harry Lang, who claimed to have visited Ukraine at the same time, that Herriot was shown a carefully stage-managed version of Ukraine that hid effects of famine and poverty.

=== Douglas Tottle ===
In the 1980s, the union organizer and journalist Douglas Tottle wrote a book with the help of Soviet authorities arguing that the famine in Ukraine was not genocide, under the title "Fraud, Famine and Ukrainian Fascism", to be published in Soviet Ukraine. However, before final publication, reviewers of the book in Kyiv insisted that the name of the book be changed, claiming "Ukrainian fascism never existed". Tottle refused this name change, and as a result the book publication was delayed by several years.

In 1987, Tottle published the book in Toronto, Canada as Fraud, Famine, and Fascism: the Ukrainian Genocide Myth from Hitler to Harvard through Progress Publishers. In a review of Tottle's book in the Ukrainian Canadian Magazine, published by the Association of United Ukrainian Canadians, Wilfred Szczesny wrote: "Members of the general public who want to know about the famine, its extent and causes, and about the motives and techniques of those who would make this tragedy into something other than what it was will find Tottle's work invaluable". Historian Roman Serbyn responded that "in the era of glasnost, Szczesny could have rendered his readers no greater disservice". Serbyn likened Tottle's book to The Hoax of the Twentieth Century, a work of Holocaust denial by Arthur Butz. Some of Tottle's material appeared in a 1988 article in the Village Voice, "In Search of a Soviet Holocaust: A 55-Year-Old Famine Feeds the Right".

In 1988, the nonprofit World Congress of Free Ukrainians held an International Commission of Inquiry Into the 1932–33 Famine in Ukraine to establish whether the famine existed and its cause. Tottle's book was examined during the Brussels sitting of the commission, held between 23 and 27 May 1988, with testimony from various expert witnesses. The commission president Professor Jacob Sundberg claimed that Tottle received assistance from the Soviet government, based on information in the book that he argued would not have been available to the general public.

== Modern politics and law ==
=== Background ===
The issue of the Holodomor has been a point of contention between Russia and Ukraine, as well as within Ukrainian politics. According to opinion polls, Russia has experienced an increase in pro-Stalin sentiments since the year 2000, with over half viewing Stalin favourably in 2015. Since independence, Ukrainian governments have passed a number of laws dealing with the Holodomor and the Soviet past.

By 2009, Holodomor denial was a matter of Russian government policy and the subject of its disinformation operations. The Russian government does not recognize the famine as an act of genocide against Ukrainians, viewing it rather as a "tragedy" that affected the Soviet Union as a whole. A 2008 letter from Russian president Dmitry Medvedev to Ukrainian president Viktor Yushchenko asserted that "the tragic events of the 1930s are being used in Ukraine in order to achieve instantaneous and conformist political goals."

Although from writers such as Alexander Motyl, his research indicated that Soviet and Russian denialism has paradoxically strengthened efforts to preserve the memory of the Holodomor both in Ukraine and among Ukrainian diasporas. The attempt to erase historical memory has motivated Ukrainian activists, scholars, and policymakers to institutionalize Holodomor remembrance as a central pillar of national identity. As former Ukrainian president Leonid Kuchma had established a national Holodomor Memorial Day in November 1988, which was renamed to the Day of Memory for Victims of the Holodomors and Political Repressions in 2004.

=== Denial literature ===
English-language publications are catalogued according to Library of Congress Subject Headings distinguishing Holodomor denial ("works that discuss the diminution of the scale and significance of the Ukrainian Famine of 1932-1933 or the assertion that it did not occur."), and Holodomor denial literature ("Works that make such assertions").

In 2006, the All-Ukrainian Public Association Intelligentsia of Ukraine for Socialism published a pamphlet titled Mif o golodomore (The Myth of the Holodomor) by G. S. Tkachenko. The pamphlet claimed that Ukrainian nationalists and the US government were responsible for creating the "myth". Russian publicist Yuri Mukhin has published a book titled Klikushi Golodomora (Hysterical Women of the Holodomor), dismissing Holodomor as "Russophobia" and "a trump card of the Ukrainian Nazis." Sigizmund Mironin's "Golodomor" na Rusi (The "Holodomor" in Rus') argued that the cause of the famine was not Stalin's policies, but rather the chaos engendered by the New Economic Policy.

Sputnik News, a Russian state media outlet, ran an article denying the severity and causes of the famine in Ukraine.

In his Ucraina. La vera storia ("Ukraine: The True Story"), Italian-Moldovan author Nicolai Lilin downplayed the Ukrainian specificity of the Holodomor by conflating it with the Soviet famine of 1930–1933.

A chapter of Bloodlands by Timothy Snyder covering the early 1930s famine in Ukraine under the Soviet Union goes into considerable detail, but the term "Holodomor" is avoided entirely, and Snyder does not explain why.

=== Laws against denial ===
Many scholars consider Holodomor denial to be a form a form of historical negationism. Ukraine's 2006 Law On the Holodomor of 1932-1933 in Ukraine makes it illegal to publicly deny the Holodomor, recognizing it as an insult to the memory of victims and humiliation of the dignity of the Ukrainian people.

== See also ==
- Outline of the Holodomor
- Bibliography of the Holodomor
- Anti-Katyn
- Genocide denial
- Genocide recognition politics
- Holocaust denial
- Holodomor genocide question
- Holodomor in modern politics

== Video resources ==
- Harvest of Despair (1983), produced by the Ukrainian Canadian Research and Documentation Centre.
