= Abo =

Abo or ABO may refer to:

== Entertainment ==
- Ābo, the Japanese name of Ekans, a fictional species in the Pokémon franchise
- Omegaverse, a genre of fiction also known as A/B/O

== Languages ==
- Abõ or Abon, a Cameroonian language (ISO 639-3: abo)
- Bankon language or Abo, a Cameroonian language

== Math and science ==
- ABO blood group system, a human blood type and blood group system
  - ABO (gene), in humans which encodes the ABO blood group system transferase enzyme
- Adaptive Binary Optimization, an image compression algorithm

== Organizations ==
- American Board of Ophthalmology, a professional organization for ophthalmologists
- American Board of Opticianry, a professional organization for opticians
- American Board of Orthodontics, a professional organization for orthodontists
- Antikythira Bird Observatory in Greece

== People ==
- Abo (name), an Arabic or Hebrew male name
- Abo of Tiflis (c. 756–786), an Arab East Orthodox Catholic saint
- Abo, a (usually derogatory) term for Aboriginal Australians

== Places ==
- Abo (historic place), an archaeological site in New Mexico, US
- Åbo, the Swedish name for Turku, a city in Finland
- Abo, Missouri, an unincorporated community
- Abo, New Mexico, an unincorporated community in the US
- Abo Canyon, also called Abo Pass, a mountain pass in central New Mexico
- Aboh, also known as Abo or Ibo, a town in Nigeria's Delta State
- Aboisso Airport in Comoé District, Ivory Coast (IATA airport code ABO)
- Antonio (Nery) Juarbe Pol Airport in Arecibo, Puerto Rico (FAA airport code ABO)

== See also ==
- Treaty of Åbo
- Abbo (disambiguation)
- Abo Call, the first Aboriginal-focused magazine in Australia, published 1938
