= Léonie Abo =

Activist during Kwilu Rebellion in Belgian Congo

Wassis Hortense Léonie Abo
- Born: 16 August 1945 (age 80); Malungu, Belgian Congo
- Occupations: Guerrilla fighter, Writer
- Spouse: Pierre Mulele
- Children: Eulalie, Ghislaine

Wassis Hortense Léonie Abo (born 1945) is a Congolese writer and former left-wing activist during the Kwilu Rebellion in the Congo Crisis. She was the wife of the Congolese communist rebel and leader of the Kwilu Rebellion, Pierre Mulele.

== Life ==
Wassis Hortense Léonie Abo was born in 1945 in a place called Malungu in what was then the Belgian Congo. She was brought up by adopted parents as her mother died giving birth to her; as a result of this last event she was given the name "Abo", which means "sorrow" in the Bambunda language. She witnessed her adoptive father taking a stick to his wife that resulted in her beating ending with a broken arm. She was well educated starting school at seven and moving on to a missionary school at nine. She was an early trained midwife and by the age of fourteen she was supervising births.

She entered an abusive arranged marriage in Gaspar Mumputo in September 1959. She had been told about the temptations of the flesh by the nuns who educated her and she remembered her wedding night being filled with pain and blood. Her marriage ended after June 1962 when her husband took her and her prospective lover to court. She was sent to jail for a month. Abo was tricked into joining a group of rebels by her brothers. In January 1964 she was still part of that group when they rose as part of the Kwilu Rebellion against the government.

The rebel Pierre Mulele married her and they spent five years alongside guerrillas loyal to Mulele. She was treated with disproportionate respect because of her husband. She was disappointed when her husband took another wife and planned to take a third. In 1968, after her husband's assassination, she fled to Congo-Brazzaville as she feared for her life. Abo has made a great effort to record the works of herself and Pierre Mulele. The Belgian book Une Femme du Congo (A Congolese Woman), by Ludo Martens, tells Abo's life story.
