= Anti-Katyn =

Denialism campaign

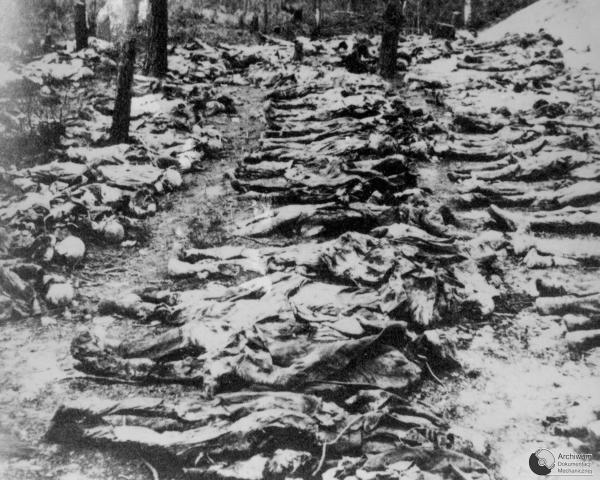
Exhumation of victims of the Katyn Massacre, 1943

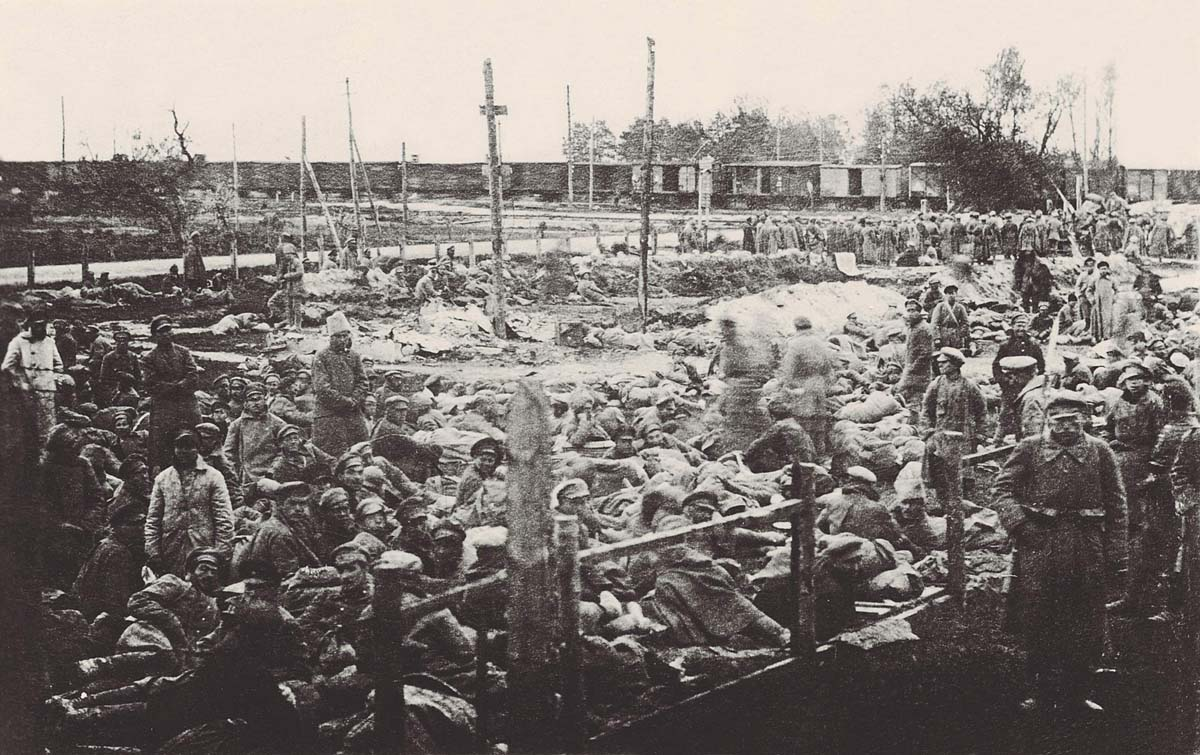
Soviet prisoners of war held near Radzymin

Anti-Katyn (Polish: Anty-Katyń, Russian: Анти-Катынь) is a denialism campaign intended to reduce and obscure the significance of the Katyn massacre of 1940 — where approximately 22,000 Polish military and police officers, border guards, and intelligentsia prisoners of war were murdered by the Soviet NKVD on the orders of Joseph Stalin — by referencing the deaths from disease of thousands of Imperial Russian and Red Army soldiers at Polish internment camps during the Interwar period.

"Anti-Katyn" first emerged around 1990. After the Soviet government admitted that it had previously tried to cover up its responsibility for the massacre by claiming that it was perpetrated by the German Wehrmacht, previously neglected research into the fate of Soviet POWs in Poland in 1920s was revived to be used as a "tit-for-tat" argument in the discussions of Katyn.

Polish historian Andrzej Nowak summarized "Anti-Katyn" as an attempt by certain Russian historians and publicists to "overshadow the memory of the crimes of the Soviet system against the Poles, creating imaginary analogies or even justification" because of the earlier deaths of the prisoners of war.

== Background ==
In 1987, on the occasion of the 42nd anniversary of the Warsaw Pact in the midst of perestroika, Soviet leader Mikhail Gorbachyov and Polish leader Wojciech Jaruzelski signed a declaration about cooperation in the issues of ideology, on the base of which a Poland–Soviet commission on the history of Polish Soviet relations (ru:Советско-польская комиссия по изучению истории двух стран).

One of the most "difficult issues" was the World War II massacre of approximately 22,000 Polish citizens, who were executed and buried in mass graves in several places including Katyn, Smolensk Oblast, less than a year after the coordinated Nazi-German and Soviet invasion of Poland. In 1943, by which time Smolensk had become German-occupied Soviet territory, the Katyn mass graves were discovered by German telephone and communication workers. The Soviet Union officially denied responsibility; a Soviet commission blamed the deaths on Nazi Germany during the Nuremberg Trials.

Under subsequent communist regimes in Poland and the Soviet Union, the Katyn massacre was not subject to further investigation for decades, even as a potential war crime committed by the Germans. Georgy Lukich Smirnov, head of the archival Institute of Marxism-Leninism, was tasked with leading a full investigation. In 1990, the Soviet Union officially admitted that the NKVD committed the massacre on the orders of Josef Stalin following a recommendation by Lavrenty Beria. Gorbachev condemned it as another example of Stalinism.

== "Anti-Katyn" ==
After the official admission of the fact that the Soviet government was responsible for the massacre, some Russian historians and journalists responded by alleging mass executions of Soviets in post-World War I Polish internment camps. The early Soviet deaths became the subject of, according to the Polish government, "various propagandist campaigns" purporting that the massacre of the Poles was "justified" in the eyes of Stalin.

Professor Aleksandr Guryanov, of the Memorial Society, named Mikhail Gorbachev as one of the instigators of "anti-Katyn" when Gorbachev demanded an investigation into the deaths of the Soviet citizens in Polish custody and other damages to the Soviet Union from the side of Poland, with results to be used in talks with Poland about "blind spots" in history.

In 2011, Russian historian Inessa Yazhborovskaya wrote:

The fear of clarifying the circumstances of the Katyn case, in particular the issues of responsibility for the party and state leadership, created a new problem, the so-called "anti-Katyn" – finding ways of glossing over the truth and avoiding admission of guilt on the Soviet side concerning the criminal, secret mass murder of Polish prisoners of war, by finding "balance" and presenting a "counterclaim."

— "The Katyn Affair: On the Way to the Truth" (Questions of History, May 2011)

In 2004, a joint Polish-Russian research team estimated that approximately 60,000 to 80,000 Russian and Soviet army members were held in Poland from 1919 to 1924. An estimated 16,000 to 20,000 died because of disease, mainly typhus, cholera and dysentery.

Others have countered that the "anti-Katyn" arguments concerning the deaths of the Soviet POWs are irrelevant to the discussion of Katyn. Historian Nikita Petrov of Russia's "Memorial" society said, "This is about that simple Russian 'correct' way of perceiving and absorbing the Katyn crime. This message should be: 'Stalin was, of course, bad. But he was no exception. He killed the Poles, but the Poles also killed us ...'"

The subject was discussed during the 2011 Capitol Hill conference "Katyn: Unfinished Inquiry". John Lenczowski, president of the Institute of World Politics, noted that Soviet POWs were invaders and while suffering harsh treatment in the camps, they mostly died of communicable diseases, while the victims of Katyn were deliberately shot and murdered.

In the 2010 documentary What Can Dead Prisoners Do, Russian, British, and Polish historians were invited to talk about these accusations.

In 2017, the Polish Ministry of Foreign Affairs protested against Russian plaques placed in Katyn, "featuring false information about the Bolshevik prisoners of the 1919-1921 war, who had died in Polish captivity". Institute of National Remembrance also protested.

== See also ==
- Poland–Russia relations
- And you are lynching Negroes, a Soviet tu quoque cliche in response to various accusations
- Double genocide
- Holocaust denial
- Holodomor denial
