= Domenico Losurdo =

Italian Marxist philosopher and historian (1941–2018)

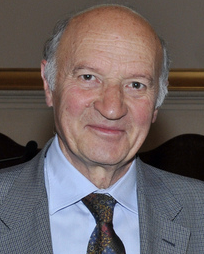
- Born: 14 November 1941; Sannicandro di Bari, Italy
- Died: 28 June 2018 (aged 76); Ancona, Italy

Education
- Education: University of Urbino

Philosophical work
- Era: Contemporary philosophy
- Region: Western philosophy
- School: Hegelianism; Marxism
- Notable works: Liberalism: A Counter-History; Stalin: History and Criticism of A Black Legend
- Notable ideas: Communist autophobia, political-moral and naturalistic despecification

Domenico Losurdo (14 November 1941 – 28 June 2018) was an Italian historian, essayist, Marxist philosopher, and communist politician.

== Life and career ==
Born in Sannicandro di Bari, Italy, Losurdo obtained his doctorate in 1963 from the University of Urbino under the guidance of Pasquale Salvucci with a thesis on Johann Karl Rodbertus. During the 1960s, he belonged to a small group of Italian communists that sided with the People's Republic of China in the Sino-Soviet split. Losurdo was director of the Institute of Philosophical and Pedagogical Sciences at the University of Urbino, where he taught history of philosophy as dean at the Faculty of Educational Sciences. From 1988, Losurdo was president of the Hegelian International Association Hegel-Marx for Dialectical Thought. He was also a member of the Leibniz Society of Sciences in Berlin (an association in the tradition of Gottfried Wilhelm Leibniz's Prussian Academy of Sciences), as well as director of the Marx XXI political-cultural association. Losurdo died on 28 June 2018 at the age of 76, due to brain cancer.

From communist militancy, the condemnation of American imperialism, and the study of the African-American and Native American question, Losurdo was also engaged concretely in national and international politics. Historian David Broder described Losurdo as "already among the most renowned Italian Marxists at the international level, as a richly partisan historian of philosophy ... ." Philosopher Daniel Tutt described Losurdo as "a renowned Marxist historian and philosopher" who "pioneered a distinctive method of historiography and intellectual history." Tutt wrote: "Losurdo made his scholarly mark in philosophical works as well as historical studies of important thinkers from John Locke and Hannah Arendt, to biographical and historical studies of Joseph Stalin. His scholarship on Hegel and modernity is considered an exemplary contribution to Hegel scholarship and he has published widely on topics such as conceptions of class struggle throughout history and the evolution of nonviolence in modern political life."

A Hegelian and Marxist philosopher as well as historian, Losurdo was described as a noncomformist, a heterodox Marxist, and a communist militant. Losurdo was influenced by Hegel's Philosophy of Right, in contrast to the two competing Hegelian trends of Marxism, which were influenced by Phenomenology of Spirit and Science of Logic respectively. Ross Wolfie notes that, Losurdo read the Philosophy of Right:

along with accompanying lectures, as championing a strong interventionist state that would curb the excesses of civil society. Hegel had lobbied for the government to provide children with free public education to protect them from whims of their parents, levy taxes on the rich in order to see to the welfare of its citizens, and take a strong hand against the rapacious law of the jungle that held sway over bourgeois property relations. Losurdo generally saw Hegel as standing “against laissez-faire opposition to state intervention in the social sphere,” and thought Marx agreed.

His work ranged from contributions to the study of Kantian philosophy (the so-called self-censorship of Immanuel Kant and his political Nicodemism) and the reevaluation of classical German idealism, especially by G. W. F. Hegel, in an attempt to re-propose the legacy in the wake of György Lukács in particular, as well as the reaffirmation of the interpretation of German and non-German Marxism (Antonio Gramsci and the brothers Bertrando and Silvio Spaventa), with incursions into the sphere of Nietzschean thought (the reading of a radical aristocratic Friedrich Nietzsche) and Heideggerian thought, in particular the question of Martin Heidegger's adhesion to Nazism.

Losurdo's philosophical-political reflection, attentive to the contextualization of philosophical thought in his own historical time, moved in particular from the themes of radical criticism of liberalism, capitalism, and colonialism as well as the traditional conception of totalitarianism in the perspective of a defence of Marxist dialectics and historical materialism, devoting himself to the study of anti-revisionism in the Marxist–Leninist sphere. Losurdo included his works in the history of ideas and concerned the investigation of questions of contemporary history and politics, with constant critical attention to historical revisionism and the controversy against the interpretations of Hannah Arendt, François Furet, Karl Popper, and Ernst Nolte. In particular, Losurdo has criticized a reactionary tendency among contemporary revisionist historians such as Nolte (who traced the impetus behind the Holocaust to the excesses of the Russian Revolution) and Furet (who linked the Stalinist purges to a "disease" originating from the French Revolution). According to Losurdo, the intention of these revisionists is to eradicate the revolutionary tradition as their true motivations have little to do with the search for a greater understanding of the past but rather it lies in both the climate and ideological needs of the political classes and is most evident in the work of the English-speaking imperial revivalists, such as Niall Ferguson and Paul Johnson. His 2015 book War and Revolution, published by Verso Books, provided a new perspective on the English, American, French, Russian, and anti-colonial revolutions.

Losurdo turned his attention to the political history of modern German philosophy from Kant to Karl Marx and the debate that developed in Germany in the second half of the 19th and in the 20th century as well as a reinterpretation of the tradition of liberalism, in particular starting from the criticism and accusations of hypocrisy addressed to John Locke for his financial participation in the Atlantic slave trade. Taking up what Arendt stated in her 1951 book The Origins of Totalitarianism, Losurdo argued that the 20th century's true original sin was the New Imperialism in the form of colonial empire of the late 19th century, where totalitarianism and internment manifested for the first time. Diego Pautasso wrote that after the dissolution of the Soviet Union, Losurdo "devoted himself to four areas of research: 1) critique of liberalism and the fight against the belief that liberals were at the forefront of democratic struggles; 2) balance of socialist experiences (USSR, China); 3) criticism of colonialism, imperialism and 'the various forms of subjugation of peoples to Washington and its allies'; 4) the critique of the contemporary left, in particular of 'Western Marxism', which would have 'neglected the great problems of its time', abandoned the 'class struggle and the struggle against imperialism' and embraced 'the narratives of globalization.'"

Upon Losurdo's death in 2018, Gianni Fresu wrote that "from the classics of philosophy to the debate around the figure of Stalin; from the analysis of the role of China to historical revisionism; from liberal thinking to the issues of Bonapartism and modern democracy; from the history of Western thought to the problems of colonialism and imperialism ... Losurdo's studies of historical materialism, as well as those of Kant, Hegel, Heidegger and Nietzsche, are a fundamental milestone in the history of ideas and events of human societies, such is their scientific seriousness and intellectual autonomy, their problematic richness and interpretative complexity."

== Ideas and research ==
According to Losurdo, despecification is the exclusion of an individual or group from the civilian community. There are two types of despecification:

- Political and moral despecification in which the exclusion is due to political or moral factors.
- Naturalistic despecification in which the exclusion is due to biological factors.

For Losurdo, naturalistic despecification is qualitatively worse than the political-moral. While the latter offers at least one escape through the change of ideology, this is not possible in the case of naturalistic despecification since it is irreversible because it refers to biological factors that are in themselves unchangeable. Unlike many other thinkers, Losurdo thought that the Holocaust of the Jewish people is not incomparable, though he was willing to admit its tragic specificity. Losurdo stated that the comparisons he offers about this did not seek to be a relativisation or a belittlement of the Holocaust, but that to consider the Jewish Holocaust as incomparable meant to lose historical perspective and to overlook the Black Holocaust (i.e. the genocide of black people) or the American Holocaust (i.e. the genocide of Native Americans in the United States through the continued deportation to the west with the Indian removal and diffusion of smallpox), as well as other mass exterminations such as the Armenian genocide.

Losurdo was a strong critic of the equation of Nazism and communism, made by scholars like François Furet and Ernst Nolte but also by Hannah Arendt and Karl Popper. Similarly, Losurdo criticized the concept of a Red Holocaust. He argued that in the Nazi concentration camps there was an explicit homicidal intention because the Jew who entered one was destined not to get out of it (as there is a naturalistic despecification) while in the Gulag there was not (as it is political-moral despecification). In the first case, the Nazis imprisoned those whom they regarded as and called Untermensch (subhuman), while in the second case (in which, he claimed, only a part of the dissidents ended up) dissidents were locked up to be re-educated and not to be killed. Despite being a practice to be condemned, Losurdo stated that "the prisoner in the Gulag is a potential 'comrade' [the guard was required to call him this] ... and after 1937 [the beginning of the two-year long Great Purge following the murder of Sergey Kirov] he is ... a potential 'citizen.'"

Taking up the opinion of Primo Levi (who was interned at Auschwitz, according to whom the Gulag was not morally equivalent to the Nazi concentration camps), and against Soviet dissident Aleksandr Solzhenitsyn (who was interned in Siberia and asserted the equivalence of the exterminationist intent in both the Gulag and Nazi concentration camps), Losurdo maintained that, although it was a disgrace that a socialist country, born as it is to abolish exploitation, resorted to imperialist and capitalist systems and methods, the Gulag was more analogous to many Western concentration camps (whose governments have supported and claim to be champions of freedom) which in some ways were more akin to the Nazi concentration camps as death camps and not re-educational, taking into consideration the history of the genocide of indigenous peoples. He also argued that British concentration camps and penal colonies were worse than any Gulag, accusing politicians such Winston Churchill and Harry S. Truman of being guilty of war crimes and crimes against humanity just like – if not worse than – those attributed to Joseph Stalin. Losurdo also took a critical view of Mahatma Gandhi and his nonviolent resistance.

Autophobia was a concept developed by Losurdo to describe how sometimes victims tend to appropriate the point of view of their oppressors and begin to despise and hate themselves. The concept of autophobia was primarily developed within the framework of the study of Jewish history and the history of slavery. Losurdo extended this concept to social classes and political parties that have suffered defeat. Losurdo stated his belief that communists suffer from autophobia, defined as a fear of themselves and their own history, a pathological problem that must be faced, unlike healthy self-criticism.

In excerpts from a conference, organized in 2003, to re-evaluate the figure of Stalin fifty years after his death, Losurdo harshly criticized the revelations contained in Nikita Khrushchev's "Secret Speech". According to Losurdo, Stalin's bad reputation derived not from the crimes committed by the latter – which he compared to others of that time – but from the falsehoods present in the report that Khrushchev read during the 20th Congress of the Communist Party of the Soviet Union in February 1956. Losurdo gave credit to one of the main accusations that were at the base of the bloody repression against his opponents, i.e. the existence of the "full-bodied reality of the fifth column" in the Soviet Union ready to ally with the enemy. Losurdo reiterated that he did not want to rehabilitate Stalin, but only to place him in the historical context and present a more neutral analysis of the facts, implementing a revisionism of the general experience of real socialism, considered as a past to be studied for the purpose of understanding the future dynamics of socialism.

== Political views ==
Ideologically a Marxist–Leninist, Losurdo supported the interpretation that Mao Zedong gave the plurality to the class struggle by paying attention to the process of female emancipation and colonized peoples. Losurdo saw China's reform and opening up as a new NEP that "did not undermine its socialist values."

Close first to the Italian Communist Party, then to the Communist Refoundation Party, and finally to the Party of Italian Communists, conflated in the Communist Party of Italy and in the Italian Communist Party, of which he was a member, Losurdo was also director of the Marx XXI political-cultural association.

Throughout his life, he was strongly opposed to American interventionism and its foreign policies, imperialism, and NATO. Controversially, Losurdo contested the awarding of the Nobel Peace Prize to Chinese dissident Liu Xiaobo, accusing Liu of supporting Western colonialism.

== Works ==
=== Aristocratic Rebel ===
In Aristocratic Rebel (2002), Losurdo criticized much of Nietzschean thought in the contemporary world, in particular, left-Nietzscheanism, whose influence on the left was a major problem because "it hollows out rationalist-oriented socialist thought and praxis and it often leads to an abandoning of universalism in favour of 'spiritual' interpretations of political struggle." This critique came from the application of Nietzsche by Italian leftists such as Giorgio Colli and Gianni Vattimo, although left-Nietzscheanism is beyond just that setting.

Tutt wrote, "[o]ne must read Losurdo's Aristocratic Rebel by staying true to his own method, that is, the political context of Losurdo's debates and polemics on the Italian left shape much of his critiques of Nietzschean thought in the contemporary world, especially left-Nietzscheanism." Tutt wrote "[w]hile Losurdo's comments on contemporary left-Nietzscheanism are brief, the convincing portrait of Nietzsche the book details generate ample material by which a new generation of Marxist philosophers and historians can begin to re-visit Nietzsche and the tradition of left-Nietzscheanism in particular."

=== Historical Revisionism ===
In Historical Revisionism (1996), Losurdo criticised the historical revisionism of authors such as François Furet and Ernst Nolte. Similar to how Enzo Traverso spoke of a Second Thirty Years' War (1914–1945) following Arno J. Mayer, Losurdo used the image of the Second Thirty Years War to use as "an expression that historians often use to denote the period of colossal upheavals between 1914 and 1945." Losurdo accused Furet and Nolte for their theory that the Russian Revolution started the European Civil War in 1917 so that the conflict between Bolshevism and Nazism is emphasized and only the former is blamed. In doing so, these revisionist historians omitted two main moments that for Losurdo are indispensable in understanding the Second Thirty Years' War, namely the total war as an experience shared by all those involved in the war and colonialism as a common modern European phenomenon on the other. Losurdo compared Adolf Hitler's struggle for Lebensraum in the East with the acquisition of a German India to the American frontier as part of the American conquest to the Pacific.

Echoing Traverso, who wrote that "Eastern Europe certainly represented the 'living space' that one wanted to colonize, but this conquest implied the annihilation of the USSR and Bolshevism, a state and an ideology which the Nazis saw as the product of a connection between 'Jewish intelligentsia' and Slavic 'sub-humanity.' So this total war was at the same time a war of conquest, a war of race and a colonial war", Losurdo argued that the European Jews got into this colonialist scenario as "Oriental natives", stating: "The fact that the fate of the Jews has been sealed by their double stigmatization as oriental 'natives' and as carriers of oriental Bolshevism is not at all considered."

=== Liberalism: A Counter-History ===
In Liberalism: A Counter-History (2005), first published in English in 2011, Losurdo argued that while purporting to emphasise the importance of individual liberty, liberalism has long been marked by its exclusion of people from these rights, resulting in racism, slavery, and genocide. Losurdo asserted that the origins of Nazism are to be found in what he views as colonialist and imperialist policies of the Western world. Losurdo examined the intellectual and political positions of intellectuals on modernity. In his view, Immanuel Kant and Georg Wilhelm Friedrich Hegel were the greatest thinkers of modernity, while Friedrich Nietzsche was its greatest critic.

Liberalism: A Counter-History received a number of positive reviews from both academic and popular presses.

=== Stalin: History and Critique of A Black Legend ===
In Stalin: History and Critique of A Black Legend (2008), first published in English in 2023, Losurdo stimulated a debate about Joseph Stalin, about whom he claimed is built a kind of black legend intended to discredit the whole of communism. Opposed to the comparison of Nazism and Stalinism, Losurdo criticized the concept of totalitarianism, especially in the works of Hannah Arendt, François Furet, Karl Popper, and Ernst Nolte, among others. Losurdo argued that totalitarianism was a polysemic concept with origins in Christian theology and that applying it to the political sphere required an operation of abstract schematism which makes use of isolated elements of historical reality to place Nazi Germany and other fascist regimes, along with the Soviet Union and other socialist states, in the dock together, serving the anti-communism of Cold War-era intellectuals rather than reflecting intellectual research.

As a Hegelian, Losurdo aimed to bring to historical knowledge two elements that are under-represented in Marxist historiography, namely rational reflection on the role of great men and rational criticism of the original form of moral leftism, or what Losurdo referred to as the "beautiful soul", which seeks to impose "the law of the heart" and the intelligence of its inevitable authoritarian reversal. For Losurdo, the ferment of authoritarianism in the communist movement is to be found more on the libertarian side of the communist utopia than in the reformist desire to build a state. Losurdo described his work on Stalin as a history of Stalin's image and not a biography or political history of the system with which his name is commonly associated. According to Losurdo, questioning the clichés of anti-Stalinism and Stalinism, including in Communist ranks since 1956, required returning to the substance of the question of the evaluation of Soviet history from 1922 to 1953 and even beyond, since the categories of anti-Stalinism and Stalinism have been generalized to the study of other socialist states ruled by communist parties and other personalities, such as Mao Zedong in China and Fidel Castro in Cuba. For Losurdo, the study of "the black legend" was partly mixed with a rehabilitation of the personality and the figure of Stalin the statesman, who is clearly distinguished from the political regime. The starting point was the observation that at the time of his death in March 1953, the image of Stalin was rather positive in the world, propaganda on both sides aside. It was the dissemination of the Khrushchev report that "cast the god into hell." According to Losurdo, it was a document originating in the internal struggle in the leadership of the party, therefore lacking in credibility.

Writing for il manifesto, Guido Liguori stated that "[h]is controversial Stalin. Storia e critica di una leggenda nera was not without its interesting elements. He proposed not so much to save Stalin (in fact he recognized many of his limits and faults)", but "he also refused to consider Stalin in merely negative terms." Writing for Jacobin, historian David Broder argued that "[w]hile he recognized the exorbitant, paranoid aspects of Stalin's leadership, his efforts to relativize it were often governed by a polemical zeal unjustified by the evidence marshaled. This made his reframing of Stalinism more 'interesting' than necessarily persuasive." Historian Sean Purdy accused Losurdo of charlatanism, putting his book on the same level as the works of Grover Furr and Ludo Martens, while contrasting it with what called more serious authors, like Robert W. Thurston and J. Arch Getty.

The book rendered Losurdo's polarising view. O Globo summarized that Losurdo has been "[p]raised for his criticism of liberalism by some, and accused of Stalinism by others. ... From liberals to the far left, everyone has an adjective on the tip of their tongue (or fingers) to refer to Caetano's new favourite author: Stalinist, revolutionary, farcical, anti-imperialist, revisionist. For some, the Italian was a champion of socialism who denied the farces propagated by liberalism. For others, he was a defender of the crimes of the Soviet dictator Joseph Stalin (1878-1953) and of Chinese authoritarianism." O Globo wrote that Losurdo compared the crimes of Stalin with those of liberalism (genocides sponsored by capitalist nations, concentration camps maintained by the colonial powers, and war crimes) and argued that in the end, it is the liberals who have the dirtiest or worst track record.

A review written in April 2009 by Guido Liguori in Liberazione (the official organ of the Communist Refoundation Party) of his book, in which Losurdo criticized the demonisation of Stalin carried out by the predominant historiography and tried to remove it from what he calls "the black legend about him", was at the center of a controversy within the drafting of the aforementioned review. A storm of protests ensued when around twenty editors sent a letter of protest to the editor of the newspaper in which they criticized both Losurdo's attempt at Stalin's rehabilitation in his book and Liguori's review (judged to be too positive with respect to the book) as well as with the choice of the editor of the newspaper to publish said review. The book was criticized for its claims, and the methodology used, by Valerio Evangelisti, Antonio Moscato, Niccolò Pianciola, and Andrea Romano.

Losurdo's view that purges were legitimate because of the "permanent state of exception caused by imperialist intervention and siege", with Liguori summarising Losurdo's argument that "the harshness of his leadership was due to the Western powers' intrigues and the existence of a powerful 'Fifth Column' within the USSR of the 1930s" and a continuation of the Russian Civil War, described as being imposed by imperialism, were criticized as being a defence of the Stalinist purges by Cicero Araujo and Mario Maestri. Losurdo's work has been praised by Grover Furr, who started a mutual friendship with Losurdo, whom Furr praised especially for his 2008 book on Stalin. Losurdo continued to cooperate with Furr, introducing him to an Italian publisher who published the Italian translation of Furr's book Khrushchev Lied in 2016, with Losurdo's introduction. Additionally, Losurdo wrote a blurb for the back cover of Furr's 2013 book The Murder of Sergei Kirov and an introduction to the book that remains unpublished.

=== Western Marxism ===
In Western Marxism (2017), first published in English in 2024, Losurdo outlined a split between Western Marxism and Eastern Marxism. Losurdo criticized Western Marxism for "hav[ing] 'neglected the great problems of its time', abandoning the 'class struggle and the struggle against imperialism', and embracing 'the narratives of globalization'".

== Controversy and debate ==
The book about Stalin caused some controversy and debate internationally, especially in Brazil and Germany, with critics such as Marxist historian Christoph Jünke labelling Losurdo "a neo-Stalinist". Professor Araujo Cicero wrote that Losurdo "recognizes 'tragedy and horror' from the years when the Soviet Union was led by Stalin" but accused Losurdo's work of being a defence of "the main decisions [Stalin] made over the almost thirty years he was at the head of the country after Lenin's death." Historian Mario Maestri wrote that "[m]uch of the reference and support bibliography used by Losurdo consists of revisionist, denialist and openly conservative and anti-communist authors and/or researchers ... of questionable reputation", citing The Black Book of Communism and Curzio Malaparte as examples. Author Andreas Wehr does not consider these accusations tenable, as Losurdo did not in any way deny the crimes during the Stalin era and described them in detail.

The publication in the communist newspaper Liberazione of a positive review by Guido Liguori on Losurdo's book about Stalin caused a crisis in the paper's editorial staff: twenty journalists wrote a letter to the editor Dino Greco, criticizing what they perceived as Losurdo's attempts at Stalin's rehabilitation, alongside Liguori's review (which they perceived as too positive) and Greco's decision to publish it. Losurdo's work was also derided by Italian liberal journalist Andrea Romano, who accused Losurdo and Luciano Canfora of "trying to create a harmless Stalinism".

About Losurdo's work on Stalin, Cicero wrote that "[u]nlike the typical old-time Stalinist, Losurdo does not evade a series of crimes committed by the regime and its dictator, nor does it qualify them simply as 'mistakes'. Also unlike the classic Stalinist, the author is not concerned with showing the coherence of his practices with Marxism or Leninism." Cicero further stated "it is the ability and perspicacity to face realistically the great problems of your country and its time – even against the most ingrained beliefs and utopias of your former travel companions – that the book seeks to highlight. In spite of all the barbarities committed, Stalin and his regime leave their multifaceted assessment with a positive balance." Cicero argued that this was not because "they knew how to build possible socialism, the famous 'socialism in one country", but "for the simple reason that they managed to build a state and a society sufficiently vertebrate to face the chaos of the Russian 'second period of disorder' and the European 'second war of the thirties', with its most deadly by-product (Nazism), were it not for that tremendous endeavour, albeit a bloody one, it was destined to destroy the Slavic nations to the east." Cicero wrote that "Stalin and Stalinism are, in short, defended for reasons to which any admirer of State-building as a good in itself, regardless of its ideological purposes and justifications, should surrender. 'Socialism in one country' becomes, in this sense, just a formula that the dictator and his supporters improvised to fit this elementary task to the language that was understandable to them."

Bernardo Vargaftiq of Esquerda Online praised Losurdo for Liberalism: A Counter-History and his work on capitalism, colonialism, and liberalism, stating that "books like 'The Counterhistory of Liberalism' are positive, exposing liberalism ... in an energetic and very well documented way" and "[t]he examples given by Losurdo of the extreme reactionary nature of so-called liberals, including people often cited laudably, such as Toqueville, are edifying." While stating that "reading these books on Liberalism and Bonapartism is useful to historians and Marxists in general, they illustrate the history of capitalism in very convincing detail", Vargaftiq referred to Losurdo as a "neo-Stalinist chic", and criticized him for making a nationalist rather than Marxist analysis, for supporting the fifth column theory, and in general for his dismissive views of Trotskyism.

About Losurdo's work on Western Marxism, Marxist historian Mario Maestri wrote that this is "a false split and a false controversy", and accused Losurdo of replacing "the proletarian internationalism and class struggles of the 'Western Marxists' with the unified nation – that is, bourgeoisie and united proletarians – in the name of national developmentalism – as if development, as well as science and technology, were ideologically neutral and not dictated by the interests of the dominant versus the dominated classes." Maestri, who defends the thesis "we live in a historical counterrevolutionary phase", whose "milestones were the capitalist restoration in China in 1978 under the leadership of reformer Deng Xiaoping and the dissolution of the Soviet Union in 1992 – events that consolidated the globalization of capitalism", accused Losurdo of presenting "an apology for the capitalism of the Chinese Communist Party and its many business projects in Asia, Africa and Latin America", establishing this "as the only alternative for its economic development and the only way for the emancipation of European and American imperialism." According to Maestri, Losurdo defended that "the working classes of the countries on the periphery of the capital – Asia, Africa and Latin America – give up their political independence and pragmatically ally themselves with the capitalism of the Chinese CP."

Marxist historian Douglas Greene described Losurdo as "one of the most sophisticated defenders of Stalinism on the Marxist left" in his book In Stalin's Shadow. According to Greene, Losurdo failed to understand Leon Trotsky's criticism of Stalinism as a "Thermidorian regime" because he viewed Stalin's actions and "retreat to realism" as necessary for the achievement of socialism.

Losurdo was influenced by Hegel's Philosophy of the Right, in which he saw Hegel "championing a strong interventionist state that would curb the excesses of civil society". Consequently, Losurdo formed revisionist views on withering away of the state, considering the doctrine itself "to be foolish from the outset, and that Stalin’s loyalty to it (in word, if not in deed) was a mistake."

== Bibliography ==
- Autocensura e compromesso nel pensiero politico di Kant, Napoli: Bibliopolis, 1983.
- Hegel. Questione nazionale, restaurazione. Presupposti e sviluppi di una battaglia politica Domenico Giammarco, Urbino: Università degli Studi, 1983.
- Tra Hegel e Bismarck. La rivoluzione del 1848 e la crisi della cultura tedesca, Roma: Editori Riuniti, 1983. ISBN 88-359-2570-3.
- György Lukács nel centenario della nascita, 1885–1985, a cura di e con Pasquale Salvucci e Livio Sichirollo, Urbino: Quattro venti, 1986.
- Marx e i suoi critici, a cura di e con Gian Mario Cazzaniga e Livio Sichirollo, Urbino: Quattro venti, 1987. ISBN 88-392-0014-2.
- La catastrofe della Germania e l'immagine di Hegel, Milano: Guerini, 1987. ISBN 88-7802-014-1.
- Metamorfosi del moderno. Atti del Convegno. Cattolica, 18-20 settembre 1986, a cura di e con Gian Mario Cazzaniga e Livio Sichirollo, Urbino: Quattro venti, 1988. ISBN 88-392-0071-1.
- Hegel, Marx e la tradizione liberale. Libertà, uguaglianza, Stato, Roma: Editori Riuniti, 1988. ISBN 88-359-3143-6.
- Tramonto dell'Occidente? Atti del Convegno organizzato dall'Istituto italiano per gli studi filosofici e dalla Biblioteca comunale di Cattolica. Cattolica, 19-21 maggio 1988, a cura di e con Gian Mario Cazzaniga e Livio Sichirollo, Urbino: Quattro venti, 1989. ISBN 88-392-0128-9.
- Antropologia, prassi, emancipazione. Problemi del marxismo, a cura di e con Georges Labica e Jacques Texier, Urbino: Quattro venti, 1990. ISBN 88-392-0166-1.
- Égalité-inégalité. Atti del Convegno organizzato dall'Istituto italiano per gli studi filosofici e dalla Biblioteca comunale di Cattolica. Cattolica, 13-15 settembre 1989, a cura di e con Alberto Burgio e Jacques Texier, Urbino: Quattro venti, 1990.
- Prassi. Come orientarsi nel mondo. Atti del convegno organizzato dall'Istituto Italiano per gli Studi filosofici e dalla Biblioteca Comunale di Cattolica (Cattolica, 21-23 settembre 1989), a cura di e con Gian Mario Cazzaniga e Livio Sichirollo, Urbino: Quattro venti, 1991. ISBN 88-392-0214-5.
- La comunità, la morte, l'Occidente. Heidegger e l'ideologia della guerra, Torino: Bollati Boringhieri, 1991. ISBN 88-339-0595-0.
- Massa folla individuo. Atti del Convegno organizzato dall'Istituto italiano per gli studi filosofici e dalla Biblioteca comunale di Cattolica. Cattolica, 27-29 settembre 1990, a cura di e con Alberto Burgio e Gian Mario Cazzaniga, Urbino: Quattro venti, 1992. ISBN 88-392-0217-X.
- Hegel e la libertà dei moderni, Roma: Editori Riuniti, 1992. ISBN 88-359-3571-7; Napoli: La scuola di Pitagora, 2011.
- Rivoluzione francese e filosofia classica tedesca, a cura di, Urbino: Quattro venti, 1993. ISBN 88-392-0229-3.
- Democrazia o bonapartismo. Trionfo e decadenza del suffragio universale, Torino: Bollati Boringhieri, 1993. ISBN 88-339-0732-5.
- Marx e il bilancio storico del Novecento, Gaeta, Bibliotheca, 1993; Napoli: La scuola di Pitagora, 2009. ISBN 9788889579381.
- Gramsci e l'Italia. Atti del Convegno internazionale di Urbino, 24-25 gennaio 1992, a cura di e con Ruggero Giacomini e Michele Martelli, Napoli: La città del sole, 1994.
- La seconda Repubblica. Liberismo, federalismo, postfascismo, Torino: Bollati Boringhieri, 1994. ISBN 88-339-0873-9.
- Autore, attore, autorità, a cura di e con Alberto Burgio, Urbino: Quattro venti, 1996. ISBN 88-392-0359-1.
- Il revisionismo storico. Problemi e miti, Roma-Bari: Laterza, 1996. ISBN 88-420-5095-4.
- Utopia e stato d'eccezione. Sull'esperienza storica del socialismo reale, Napoli: Laboratorio politico, 1996.
- Ascesa e declino delle repubbliche, a cura di e con Maurizio Viroli, Urbino: Quattro venti, 1997. ISBN 88-392-0418-0.
- Lenin e il Novecento. Atti del Convegno internazionale di Urbino, 13-14-15 gennaio 1994, a cura di e con Ruggero Giacomini, Napoli: La città del sole, 1997. ISBN 88-86521-41-3.
- Metafisica. Il mondo Nascosto, con altri, Roma-Bari: Laterza, 1997. ISBN 88-420-5146-2.
- Antonio Gramsci dal liberalismo al «Comunismo critico», Roma: Gamberetti, 1997. ISBN 88-7990-023-4.
- Dai fratelli Spaventa a Gramsci. Per una storia politico-sociale della fortuna di Hegel in Italia, Napoli: La città del sole, 1997. ISBN 88-86521-73-1.
- Hegel e la Germania. Filosofia e questione nazionale tra rivoluzione e reazione, Milano: Guerini, 1997. ISBN 88-7802-752-9.
- Nietzsche. Per una biografia politica, Roma: Manifestolibri, 1997. ISBN 88-7285-124-6.
- Il peccato originale del Novecento, Roma-Bari: Laterza, 1998. ISBN 88-420-5660-X.
- Dal Medio Oriente ai Balcani. L'alba di sangue del secolo americano, Napoli: La città del sole, 1999. ISBN 88-8292-012-7.
- Fondamentalismi. Atti del Convegno organizzato dall'Istituto italiano per gli studi filosofici e dalla Biblioteca comunale di Cattolica. Cattolica 11-12 ottobre 1996, a cura di e con Alberto Burgio, Urbino: Quattro venti, 1999. ISBN 88-392-0517-9.
- URSS: bilancio di un'esperienza. Atti del Convegno italo-russo. Urbino, 25-26-27 settembre 1997, a cura di e con Ruggero Giacomini, Urbino: Quattro venti, 1999. ISBN 88-392-0512-8.
- L'ebreo, il nero e l'indio nella storia dell'Occidente: Urbino: Quattro venti, 1999.
- Fuga dalla storia? Il movimento comunista tra autocritica e autofobia, Napoli: La città del sole, 1999. ISBN 88-8292-009-7; poi Fuga dalla storia? La rivoluzione russa e la rivoluzione cinese oggi, 2005. ISBN 88-8292-275-8.
- La sinistra, la Cina e l'imperialismo, Napoli: La città del sole, 2000. ISBN 88-8292-020-8.
- Universalismo e etnocentrismo nella storia dell'Occidente, Urbino: Quattro venti, 2000.
- La comunità, la morte, l'Occidente. Heidegger e l'«ideologia della guerra», Torino: Bollati Boringhieri, 2001. ISBN 88-339-0595-0.
- Nietzsche, il ribelle aristocratico. Biografia intellettuale e bilancio critico, Torino: Bollati Boringhieri, 2002. ISBN 88-339-1431-3.
- Cinquant'anni di storia della repubblica popolare cinese. Un incontro di culture tra Oriente e Occidente. Atti del Convegno di Urbino, 8-9 giugno 2001, a cura di e con Stefano G. Azzara, Napoli: La città del sole, 2003. ISBN 88-8292-239-1.
- Dalla teoria della dittatura del proletariato al gulag?, in: Karl Marx – Friedrich Engels, Manifesto del partito comunista, traduzione e introduzione di Domenico Losurdo, Editori Laterza, Bari 2003.
- Controstoria del liberalismo, Roma-Bari: Laterza, 2005. ISBN 88-420-7717-8.
- La tradizione filosofica napoletana e l'Istituto italiano per gli studi filosofici, Napoli: nella sede dell'Istituto, 2006.
- Autocensura e compromesso nel pensiero politico di Kant, Napoli: Bibliopolis, 2007. ISBN 9788870885163.
- Legittimità e critica del moderno. Sul marxismo di Antonio Gramsci, Napoli: La città del sole, 2007.
- Il linguaggio dell'Impero. Lessico dell'ideologia americana, Roma-Bari: Laterza, 2007. ISBN 9788842081913.
- Stalin. Storia e critica di una leggenda nera, Roma: Carocci, 2008. ISBN 9788843042937.
- Paradigmi e fatti normativi. Tra etica, diritto e politica, con altri, Perugia: Morlacchi, 2008. ISBN 9788860742247.
- La non-violenza. Una storia fuori dal mito, Roma-Bari: Laterza, 2010. ISBN 9788842092469.
- La sinistra assente. Crisi, società dello spettacolo, guerra, Carocci, 2014. ISBN 9788843073542.
- Nietzsche, the Aristocratic Rebel, translated by Gregor Benton, with an introduction by Harrison Fluss. Leiden: Brill, 2019. ISBN 978-90-04-27094-7. Originally published in Italian by Bollati Boringhieri Editore as Domenico Losurdo, Nietzsche, il ribelle aristocratico: Biografia intellettuale e bilancio critico, Turin: 2002.

== See also ==
- Marxist historiography
- Marxist philosophy
