= Abbo =

Abbo is a male given name (short form of French: Abbon, German: Adalbert, Adelbert) and a surname (Arabic and Hebrew variant of Abbas).

Abbo may refer to:

== Given name ==
- Abbo I of Metz (died 643), bishop of Metz
- Abbo II of Metz (died 707), bishop Metz from 697 to 707
- Abbo of Auxerre (died 860), Bishop of Auxerre
- Abbo Cernuus (died c. 992), Benedictine monk and poet
- Abbo of Fleury (c. 945–1004), abbot
- Abbo of Provence, Patrician of Provence in opposition to Maurontus in the 730s
- Abbo (bishop of Soissons) (died 937), Bishop of Soissons
- Abbo Nassour (1927–1982), Chadian politician
- Abbo Ostrowsky (1889–1975), Russian-American art teacher and etcher

== Surname ==
- Catherine Abbo (born 1972), Nigerian researcher, academic, and medical doctor
- Faraj Abbo (1921–1984), Iraqi artist, theatre director, designer, author and educator
- Gabriel Abbo (1883–1954), French politician
- Ishaku Elisha Abbo, Nigerian politician
- Jussuf Abbo (1890–1953), Palestinian-Jewish artist

== Other uses ==
- Abbo, singer and guitarist from UK Decay
- Abbo, another name for the town of Sidi Daoud, Algeria
- An ethnic slur referring to Indigenous Australians (variant of abo, derived from Aborigine)

== See also ==
- Abbas (name) (Arabic)
- Abbon (French)
- Adalbert and Adelbert (German)
