= Pierre Mulele =

Congolese politician and rebel leader (1929–1968)

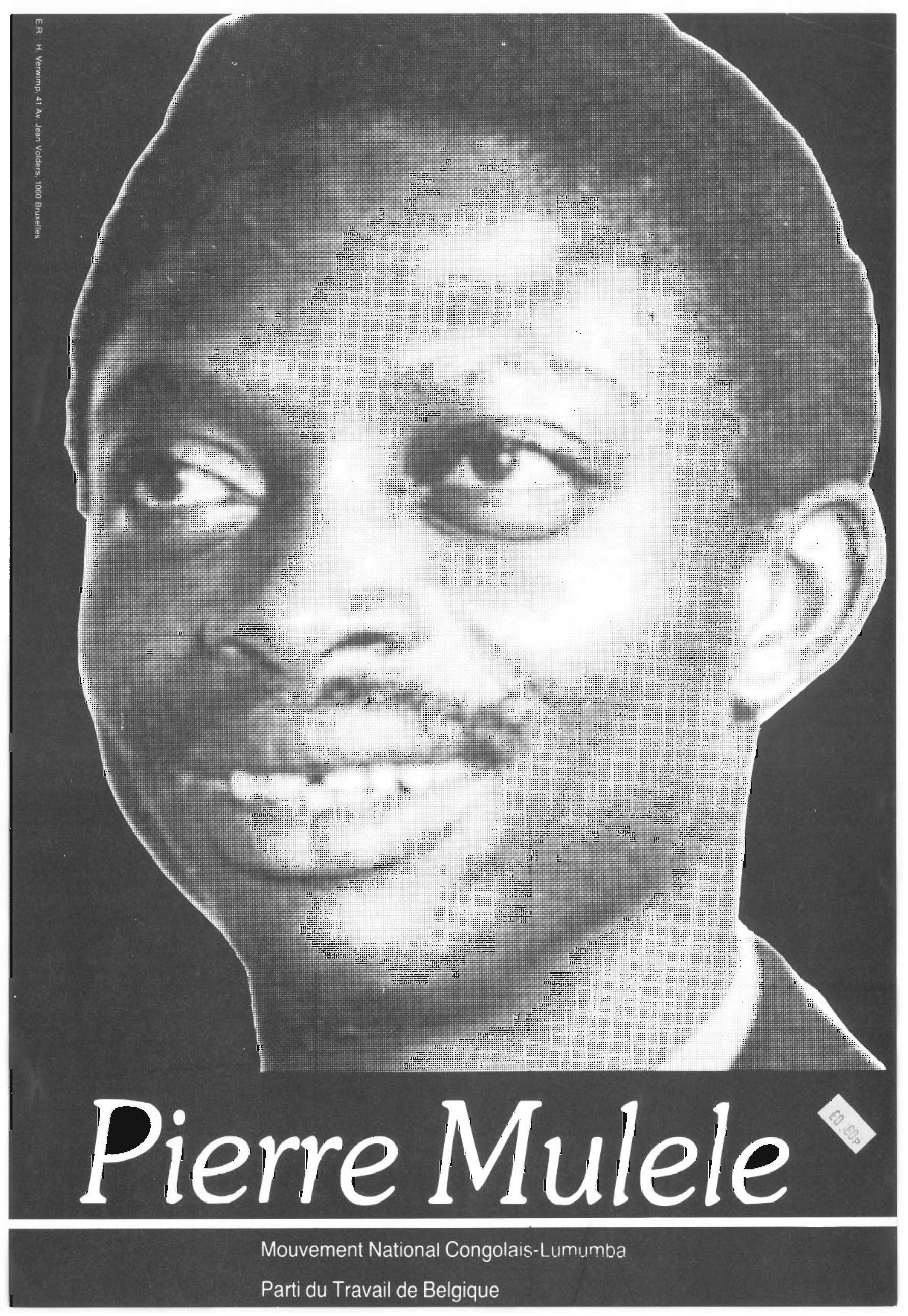
- Pierre Mulele in a campaign poster, c. 1960

Personal details
- Born: 11 August 1929 Malungu, Belgian Congo
- Died: 3 or 9 October 1968 (age 39) Kinshasa, Congo-Léopoldville
- Cause of death: Death by torture
- Spouse: Léonie Abo
- Children: Eulalie, Ghislaine
- Occupation: Guerrilla fighter

Military service
- Battles/wars: Congo Crisis; Simba rebellion; Kwilu Rebellion

Pierre Mulele (11 August 1929 – 3 or 9 October 1968) was a Congolese politician and communist rebel who led the Kwilu Rebellion during the Congo Crisis.

Mulele was a member of the Bapende ethnic group. Prior to his rebel career, he served as minister of education in Patrice Lumumba's cabinet. Following the assassination of Lumumba in January 1961 and the arrest of his recognised deputy Antoine Gizenga one year later, Mulele became one of the top Lumumba ideologues determined to continue the struggle against the Congolese government in Léopoldville (present-day Kinshasa).

He went to Cairo as the representative of the Lumumbists' Congo National Liberation Committee based in Brazzaville. From Cairo he proceeded to China in 1963 to receive military training, and also took a group of Congolese youths with him, where and the group received training in asymmetrical warfare in order to start a rebellion against the Congolese government.

After his rebellion failed, Mulele went into exile. He was lured back in Congo after Mobutu Sese Seko promised him amnesty but, once he had returned, Mobutu had him tortured and executed.

== Career ==
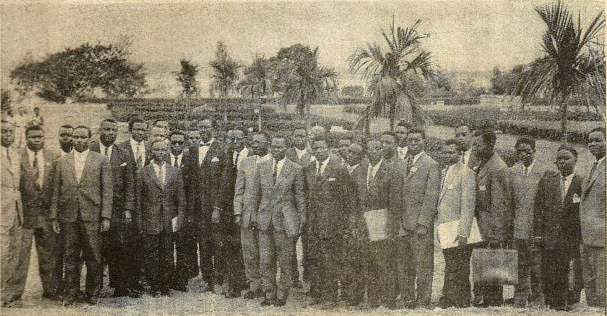
Mulele (third from the right) with the Lumumba government, 1960

=== Simba rebellion ===
In January 1964, a new conflict broke out as Congolese rebels calling themselves "Simba" (Swahili for "lion") rebelled against the government. They were led by Mulele, Gaston Soumialot and Christophe Gbenye, former members of Antoine Gizenga's Parti Solidaire Africain (PSA).

During the Simba rebellion, Mulele, who had previously undergone training in the Eastern Bloc as well as China, led a Maoist faction in the Kwilu Province. This came to be known as the Kwilu rebellion. Mulele was an avowed Maoist, and for this reason his insurgency was supported by communist China. By the end of April 1964, Mulele's rebellion had been rendered somewhat less dangerous by the government. The Soviet Union, with an embassy in the national capital of Leopoldville, did not support Mulele's Kwilu revolt and had no part in its preparation: lack of support from the Soviets was in the first place responsible for Mulele turning to China as his patron.

Nonetheless, by August the Simba insurgents had captured Stanleyville and set up a rebel government there. However, the Congolese central government requested foreign intervention, and the troops fighting under the command of Soumialot and Gbenye were routed in November 1964, after intense drives by central government troops officered by foreign mercenaries. The landing of Belgian paratroopers in Stanleyville also proved instrumental in the rebels' defeat, as did key military assistance from the United States. On 24 November 1964, five United States Air Force C-130 transports dropped 350 Belgian paratroopers of the Paracommando Regiment onto the airfield at Stanleyville to rescue 2,000 European civilians being held hostage by the Simbas. This move made the United States very unpopular in Africa at the time. After the rebellion's defeat, Mulele fled into exile in Congo-Brazzaville.

=== Ideology and Maoism ===
When the Kwilu rebellion broke out in 1964, the revolt was led by Mulele in a way reminiscent of the Chinese communist revolutionary codes. Mulele required his fighters to adhere to a very strict moral code, emphasising self-discipline and respect for civilians. The tribal peasant fighters proved difficult to control and many disregarded Mulele's orders. The eight instructions on conduct Mulele issued to his guerrilla fighters showed the great influence Maoist writings regarding "people's war" had on the Kwilu insurgency. Mulele's code of conduct was as follows:

1. Respect all men, even bad ones.
2. Buy the goods of villagers in all honesty and without stealing.
3. Return borrowed things in good time and without trouble.
4. Pay for things which you have broken and in good spirit.
5. Do not harm or hurt others.
6. Do not destroy or trample on other people's land.
7. Respect women and do not amuse yourselves with them as you would like to.
8. Do not make your prisoners of war suffer.

The attempt to adapt Maoist Chinese practice to African conditions also extended to Mulele's use of the peasants as the mainstay of his revolution.

== Death ==
In 1968, then-President Joseph-Désiré Mobutu (later Mobutu Sese Seko) lured Mulele out of exile by promising him amnesty. Mulele believed Mobutu's promise and returned to Congo-Kinshasa. There, Mobutu had him arrested and sentenced to death. Mulele was allegedly tortured before being executed: his eyes were pulled from their sockets, his genitals were ripped off, and his limbs were amputated one by one, all while he was alive. What was left was dumped in the Congo River.

== Personal life ==
Mulele was born in Isulu-Matende. He, alongside Antoine Gizenga, received his early secondary education at a seminary in Kinzambi. He continued his education at the Ecole Moyenne de Leverville established by the Huileries du Congo Belge and coordinated under the Brothers of Charity for a further three years.

He married Léonie Abo, a fellow fighter who spent five years in the underground rebel movement alongside guerrillas loyal to Mulele. In 1968, after her husband's assassination, she fled to Congo-Brazzaville where she has since lived. Abo has made a great effort to preserve the memory of her late husband. The Belgian book Une Femme du Congo (A Congolese Woman), by Ludo Martens, tells Abo's life story.
