= ABQ (disambiguation) =

ABQ is the Australian Broadcasting Corporation's Brisbane TV station.

ABQ may also refer to:

== Arts, entertainment, and media ==
- "ABQ" (Breaking Bad), an episode of the television show Breaking Bad
- Alban Berg Quartet, a string quartet founded in Vienna, Austria
- Annapolis Brass Quintet, a brass quintet founded in 1979

== Places ==
- Albuquerque, New Mexico, US
- Alvarado Transportation Center (Amtrak station code ABQ), Albuquerque, NM, US
- Albuquerque International Sunport and Kirtland Air Force Base in New Mexico, USA (IATA airport code ABQ)

== Other uses ==
- Abaza language (ISO 639 language code: abq), a Northwest Caucasian language spoken in Russia and Turkey
- Airblue (IATA airline code: PA; ICAO airline code: ABQ), a Pakistani airline
- Associação Brasileira de Química, the publisher of the chemistry scientific journal Anais da Associação Brasileira de Química

== See also ==
- ABO (disambiguation)
- AB (disambiguation)
- BQ (disambiguation)
