= Abos =

Abos or ABOS may refer to:

- Mount Ararat, Abos in ancient Greek authors
- Girolamo Abos, Maltese-Italian composer
- Abos, Pyrénées-Atlantiques, a commune in France
- Abos, a former commune of the Pyrénées-Atlantiques department in France, now part of Peyrelongue-Abos
- Abos, an offensive abbreviation for Australian Aboriginals
- Anorectic Behavior Observation Scale
- American Board of Orthopaedic Surgery

== See also ==
- Abo (disambiguation)
