= Liberalism: A Counter-History =

2005 book by Domenico Losurdo

- First edition (Italian)
- Author: Domenico Losurdo
- Original title: Controstoria del liberalismo
- Subject: Political theory
- Publisher: Editori Laterza
- Publication date: 2005
- Publication place: Italy
- English publication date: 2011

Liberalism: A Counter-History (Italian: Controstoria del liberalismo) is a 2005 book by Italian philosopher Domenico Losurdo, first published in English in 2011. In the book, Losurdo examines the inner contradictions of the highly influential history of liberalism and its political tradition. Key liberal thinkers who are discussed include John Locke, Alexis de Tocqueville, Hannah Arendt and Edmund Burke.

Losurdo argues that the liberal tradition has often excused and even celebrated racism, slavery, exploitation and genocide. Among the atrocities that Losurdo claims liberalism condoned include the Great Famine, American slavery, the Native American genocide in the United States, the Opium Wars, the suppression of the Indian Rebellion of 1857 and the Jim Crow laws.

== Summary ==
In the book, Losurdo characterises the dominant narrative regarding liberalism as hagiography, representing a gradual process of the expansion of liberty to all people. Rather, Losurdo investigates not only "the conceptual developments, but also and primarily the political and social relations it found expression in" which made itself known through various contradictions. Not only is the process contradictory, but it is also marked by episodes where a group that is given rights can have those rights taken away. One such example is when Black Americans lost many of their newfound rights as the end of the Reconstruction Era gave way to the rise of Jim Crow laws.

According to Losurdo, liberalism lent itself to the foundation of Herrenvolk democracy, where one ethnic group had rights over other disenfranchised and exploited groups. Losurdo finds the early United States, a racial state with a clear difference in the rights afforded between whites and even free Blacks, to have been one such master-race democracy. Additionally, influential liberal conservative Edmund Burke is credited with penning "the first organic theory of revolution as a Jewish conspiracy", an antisemitic conspiracy theory that was essential in fueling the genocidal aspects of Nazi ideology.

According to Losurdo, the white supremacy that was typical of liberal thinkers of the time had a formative influence on fascism while also taking the dehumanization of those it considered inferior to extremes. For instance, Losurdo observes that the one-drop rule found in the American South was more stringent than the Nuremberg Laws (citizenship is not given if found 1/4 Jewish or more) implemented by Nazi Germany.

== Reception and influence ==
Liberalism: A Counter-History has received a number of positive reviews from critics. Peter Clarke wrote in the Financial Times that Liberalism: A Counter-History is "a brilliant exercise in unmasking liberal pretensions, surveying over three centuries with magisterial command of the sources." Essayist Pankaj Mishra wrote in The Guardian that Liberalism: A Counter-History "stimulatingly uncovers the contradictions of an ideology that is much too self-righteously invoked."

Liberalism: A Counter-History was also well received by Stefano G. Azzarà in Historical Materialism, Geoff Mann in Antipode and Iain McKay in Capital & Class.
