= Ludo Martens =

Belgian activist and historian

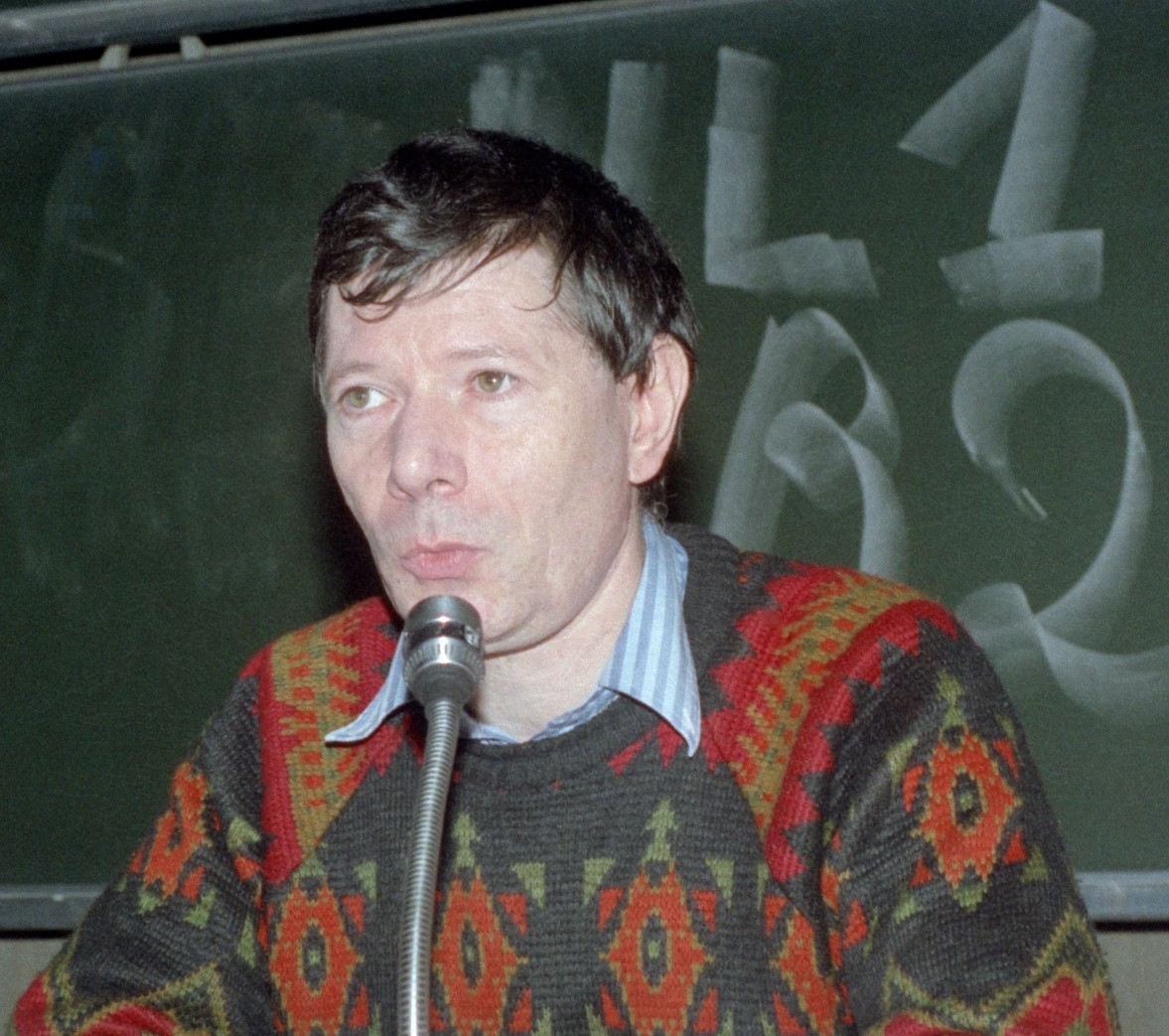

President of the Workers' Party of Belgium
- In office 4 November 1979 – 2 March 2008
- Preceded by: Office created
- Succeeded by: Peter Mertens

Personal details
- Born: Ludo Martens; 12 March 1946 Torhout, Belgium
- Died: 5 June 2011 (aged 65)
- Party: Workers' Party of Belgium
- Occupation: Activist; author; historian

Ludo Martens (12 March 1946 – 5 June 2011) was a Belgian Marxist–Leninist politician and author who founded and served as the first leader of the Workers' Party of Belgium. He wrote several works on the political history of Central Africa and the Soviet Union.

In 1968, Martens founded the group Alle macht aan de arbeiders (All Power to the Workers), which became the Workers' Party of Belgium in 1979. He served as president of the Workers' Party until 2008. Martens was the last foreigner to meet North Korean president Kim Il Sung before his death on 8 July 1994. According to a press release by the Workers' Party, Martens died on the morning of 5 June 2011 after a long illness.

== Biography ==
Martens was born in 1946, as the eldest son of a furniture manufacturer. He grew up in Wingene, West Flanders, Belgium. While at school, he showed talent in linguistics and became a newspaper editor. He also had an interest in music and poetry. In 1965, Martens entered the Louvain University to study medicine and during that time he became active in the Katholiek Vlaams Hoogstudentenverbond. Martens got expelled from his university after writing an article about pedophilia within the church on Our Life, the magazine which he ran in the university. He was influenced by the student movements in 1968. Having visited Berlin, where he came into contact with Marxist–Leninist German students, he introduced the thought of Marxism into the Belgian student movement.

In 1971, Martens founded the Alle macht aan de arbeiders (AMADA) party, which renamed itself into the Workers' Party of Belgium in 1979. He was the last communist leader to meet Kim Il Sung, two weeks before the latter's death. Kim told Martens: "I think it is very good that you have written a book about Stalin. I intend to read it." In 1999, Martens requested his party to relieve him of the post of party president, a position he had held since the founding of the party, as he wished to pursue his passion for work in the Congo. The request was granted. In nearly a decade, following 1999, he wrote his book on Laurent Kabila and the Congolese revolution, while at the same time helping to lay the foundations of a communist party in the Democratic Republic of the Congo. Martens died on the afternoon of 5 June 2011 after a long illness.

== Another View of Stalin ==
In 1994, Martens published Another View of Stalin (Un autre regard sur Staline), a work that holds an apologetic view of collectivisation in the Soviet Union and the Great Purge under Joseph Stalin. He explained his motivation for writing the book in the introduction: "Defending Stalin's work, essentially defending Marxism–Leninism, is an important, urgent task in preparing ourselves for class struggle under the New World Order." Martens referred to the notion of Stalinist crimes as a "myth" and claimed that the Molotov–Ribbentrop Pact, in which the Soviet Union agreed to invade Poland in conjunction with Nazi Germany and divide Poland, Romania, Finland, Latvia, Lithuania, and Estonia between one another into respective "spheres of influence", was "a key for victory in the anti-fascist war". The leadership of the Workers' Party of Belgium, particularly president Peter Mertens in 2016, distanced from Martens' vision on Stalin, whom they call "a dictator". Harpal Brar wrote in Martens' obituary: "His book Another view of Stalin, while nailing the bourgeois, professorial and Khrushchevite revisionist lies about Stalin, brought to the fore the brilliance of Stalin's stewardship of the CPSU(B) and the USSR, which made such a monumental contribution to the march forward of the Soviet people and humanity at large".

== Works ==
- Pierre Mulele, ou, La seconde vie de Patrice Lumumba (Antwerp: Éditions EPO, 1985). OCLC 23219832.
- Sankara, Compaoré, et la révolution burkinabé (EPO, 1989). ISBN 2-87262-033-8.
- Abo: une femme du Congo (EPO, 1992). ISBN 2-87262-103-2.
- L'U.R.S.S. et la contre-révolution de velours (USSR: The Velvet Counter Revolution) (EPO, 1991). ISBN 2-87262-057-5.
- Un autre regard sur Staline (Another View of Stalin) (EPO, 1994). ISBN 2-87262-081-8.
- Kabila et la révolution congolaise: panafricanisme ou néocolonialisme? (EPO, 2002). ISBN 2-87262-191-1.

== See also ==
- Grover Furr
- Douglas Tottle
- Domenico Losurdo
