= Abo (name) =

- Gender: Male
- Language: Arabic, Somali, Hebrew

Origin
- Meaning: Father; Stern father

Other names
- See also: Abbas, Abot

Abo is a male given name found in Arabic, Somali, and Hebrew. In Somali, Abo (or Aabbo) is the standard word for “father.” In Arabic, it is related to the word Abu (أبو), meaning “father of” or “possessor of,” which is widely used as a kunya (honorific) in names, and may also appear as a variant or short form in given names.

In some cases, Abo is considered a variant form of Abbas, from which it takes the meaning “stern” or “somber father.” In Arabic, Abbas is also a symbolic name referring to the lion, the king of beasts.

In the Russian language, the Christian male name "А́бо" (Abo) exists as well. This may have been derived from the Biblical Hebrew word for “father,” or from av, the name of a month in the Hebrew calendar.

According to the 2000 U.S. Census, Abo is an uncommon first name but a comparatively more frequent surname, ranking 53,205 out of 88,799 for both men and women.

== People with the given name Abo ==
- Abo Eisa (born 1996), Sudanese footballer
- Abo El Seoud El Ebiary (1910–1969), Egyptian screenwriter
- Abo of Tiflis (ca. 756–786), 8th-Century Christian martyr
- Prince Abo (792–842), Japanese imperial prince

== People with the surname Abo or d'Abo ==
- Jennifer d'Abo (1945–2003), British entrepreneur
- Kiyokazu Abo (1870–1948), Imperial Japanese Navy Admiral during World War I
- Léonie Abo (born 1945), Congolese writer
- Maryam d'Abo (born 1960), English television and film actress
- Mike d'Abo (born 1944), English singer-songwriter, cousin of Maryam
- Olivia d'Abo (born 1969), actress; daughter of Mike, above
- Sarah Abo, Syrian–Australian journalist
- Takeshi Abo (born 1973), Japanese video game composer
- Lady Ursula d'Abo (1916–2017), English socialite

== See also ==
- Abu Hafs Umar ibn Shuayb al-Iqritishi, 9th-century Spanish explorer and member of the Muslim clergy
