= Holodomor Memorial Day =

Annual commemoration for victims of the Ukrainian famine of 1932–33

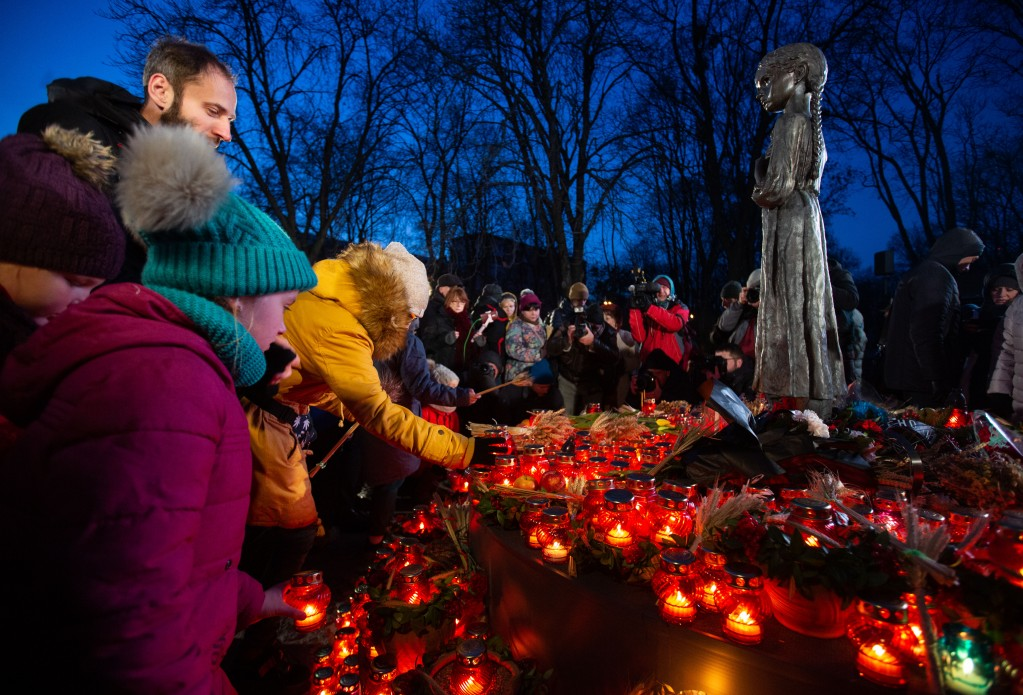
Ukrainians commemorate at the Bitter Memory of Childhood monument, outside the National Museum of the Holodomor-Genocide in 2019.

Holodomor Memorial Day or Holodomor Remembrance Day (Ukrainian: День пам'яті жертв голодоморів, romanized: Den pamiati zhertv holodomoriv, lit. 'Day of memory for victims of the holodomors') is an annual commemoration of the victims of the Holodomor, the 1932–33 man-made famine that killed millions in Ukraine, falling on the fourth Saturday of November. The day is also an official annual commemoration in Canada, and observed by Ukrainian diaspora communities in other countries.

Traditionally, on this day Ukrainians attend memorial services and put up symbolic vessels of grain and light candles in memory of the victims of the Holodomor and other deadly famines in Ukraine. Ceremonies at the Candle of Memory monument at the National Museum of the Holodomor-Genocide have been attended by Ukrainian and foreign national leaders, diplomats, representatives of governing bodies, international organizations, and faith communities, and witnesses of the Holodomor. Before 2009, ceremonies took place at the Holodomor monument in the square in front of St. Michael's Golden-Domed Monastery.

Commemorations include a national minute of silence at 16:00, followed by the lighting of the candle. Participants set candles at memorials, or place them in their window at home.

The name in plural, with "holodomors", is not universally accepted, as it can be perceived to consider the Holodomor of 1932–33, which is recognized as a genocide in Ukraine and several other states, as equivalent to the famines of the 1920s and 1940s, which are not.

== History ==
The official Day of Memory for Victims of the Holodomor on the fourth Saturday of November was established by presidential decree of Leonid Kuchma on November 26, 1998. In 2000, it was renamed Day of Memory for Victims of the Holodomor and Political Repressions, and in 2004, Day of Memory for Victims of the Holodomors and Political Repressions, also recognizing the famines of 1921–23 and 1946–47.

In 2006, the Holodomor Memorial Day took place on 25 November. Ukraine's President Viktor Yushchenko issued Decree No. 868/2006, calling for the observance of a minute of silence, beginning at 4:00 in the afternoon of the next Saturday. The decree also provided that the nation's flag should be flown at half-staff, a sign of mourning, and that entertainment events would be restricted. Television and radio broadcasts were also to be adjusted.

In 2007, the holiday's name was shortened to Day of Memory for Victims of the Holodomors, as a separate Day of Remembrance of Victims of Political Repressions was established on the third Sunday in May for victims of the Great Terror of 1937–38. That year, the 74th anniversary of the famine was marked in Kyiv over a period of three days (23 to 25 November) on the Maidan Nezalezhnosti. As part of the event, video testimonies of the Soviet regime's crimes in Ukraine were shown. Documentaries made by famous Ukrainian and foreign movie directors were also played, and experts and scholars offered lectures on the topic. The National Bank of Ukraine released a set of commemorative coins commemorating the Holodomor on November 23.

Canada observes this day as Ukrainian Famine and Genocide (“Holodomor”) Memorial Day, since 2008. The legislation was introduced in parliament as a private member's bill by James Bezan (representing Selkirk–Interlake), and achieved royal assent on May 27.

Beginning in 2009, Ukrainian schoolchildren were taught a more extensive course on the history of the Holodomor.

The Parliamentary Assembly of the Council of Europe passed a resolution welcoming the establishment of the Ukrainian day of commemoration in April 2010.

In 2023 the memorial of Holodomor genocide was publicly commemorated by a number of politicians including Roberta Metsola; European Parliament President; US Ambassador Bridget Brink, Ingrida Šimonytė; Lithuanian Prime Minister; Latvian President Edgars Rinkēvičs; Katarina Mathernova, EU Ambassador to Ukraine; UK Ambassador Martin Harris; German Embassy in Ukraine; French Ambassador Gaël Veyssiere.
