= Kwilu rebellion =

Civil uprising in Congo

- Part of the Congo Crisis and the Cold War
- Approximate extent of the Simba (green) and Kwilu rebellions (yellow)
Date	August 1963 – 10 November 1968
Location	Kwilu Province, Democratic Republic of the Congo
Result	Rebellion suppressed

Belligerents
Democratic Republic of the Congo; Supported by: (United Nations) ONUC (1964); Belgium; United States	Kwilu rebels; Supported by: China

Commanders and leaders
Joseph Kasa-Vubu; Moïse Tshombe	Pierre Mulele (executed)

Casualties and losses
- Large civilian casualties, including 200 foreigners and at minimum 60,000–70,000 Congolese

The Kwilu rebellion (1963–1965) was a civil uprising which took place in the West of what is the modern-day Democratic Republic of the Congo. The rebellion took place in the wider context of the Cold War and the Congo Crisis. Led by Pierre Mulele, a follower of ousted prime minister Patrice Lumumba, a faction of rebel Maoists staged a revolt against the government in the Kwilu District. Based around the struggle for independence, the rebellion was encouraged by economic, social, and cultural grievances. Supported by communist China, rebels used mainly guerrilla warfare against government forces. The rebellion was concurrent with the Simba rebellion occurring in other areas of the Congo during this time. While the rebellion was largely suppressed in the early months of 1965, it had lasting political impacts, leading to the dissolution of Kwilu as an official province.

== Background ==
Pierre Mulele, rebel leader of the Kwilu rebellion, had previously served as minister of education within Patrice Lumumba’s government. When Lumumba was assassinated in early 1961, Mulele became a prominent and vocal advocate for his government and beliefs. In 1962, Mulele joined a group of fellow rebels and ex-politicians named the National Committee of Liberation. Headed by Christophe Gbenye, a former Deputy Premier, the group's aim was to "free the Congo of foreign oppression".

Referred to as the ‘Second Independence’, the rebellion has been viewed as a revolutionary attempt to correct the injustices felt by many in the Congo after the first independence of 1960. Following independence in 1960, a period of social stratification occurred. This refers to the swift post-independence development leading to a significant differential in access to material rewards. Those who were able to move into the former Belgian-occupied roles in society, and those unable to achieve such opportunities for status mobility received a vastly different quality of life. The political instability within the country acted as a catalyst to turn discontent into revolt. Many of the would-be revolutionaries were young men, who felt disenfranchised and unsupported by Moïse Tshombe’s government. The attitude of many in the Congo during this period has been described as 'fighting against foreign imperialists and their Congolese lackeys'. By late 1963, the value of the Congolese franc had plummeted, schools were overcrowded, and unemployment was high in the Kwilu region. Many Congolese people viewed themselves as worse off than they were prior to independence in 1960.

Remarks made in 1962 by persons attending a meeting of the Savoir-Vivre movement in the village of Laba near Idiofa in the Kwilu reflect the discontent of many in Kwilu at the time.

"Before Independence, we dreamed that it would bring us masses of marvelous things. All of that was to descend upon us from the sky ... Deliverance and salvation ... But here it is more than two years that we have been waiting, and nothing has come ... On the contrary, our life is more difficult, we are more poor than before."

— Jacques Meert, "Une semaine dans les villages Laba", Le mouvement Savoir-Vivr Experience de developpement communautaire rural (1962)

This social discontent, alongside political infighting and hostility towards President Joseph Kasavubu, resulted in the struggle for power and resulting Congo crisis.

== Kwilu forces and ideology ==
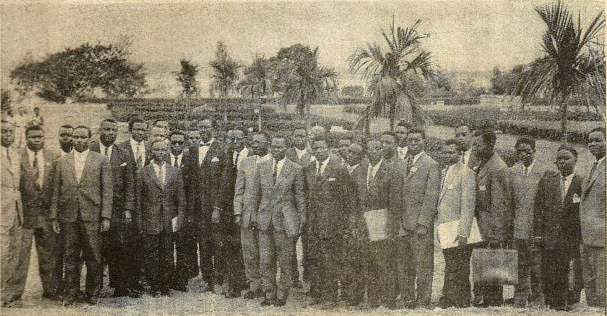
Mulele (third from the right) with the Lumumba Government, 1960

Prior to leading the Kwilu rebellion, Pierre Mulele had undergone military training in the Eastern Bloc and China. This helped to inform the rebellion's ideology, with the majority of fighters claiming Maoist inspiration. The majority of rebels recruited were of the Mbunda or Pende ethnic groups, many of which had been targets of government oppression. These two ethnic groups comprised over half of the province's population, and played a major role in the victory over the Parti Solidaire Africain in 1960. However, they only held 12 seats in the provincial government, which lead to significant discontent.

Mulele employed tactics reminiscent of Chinese revolutions, and made his fighters adhere to a strict moral code, emphasising respect for civilians and self-discipline. The rebellion was backed by China, however, there is no evidence of physical support such as weapons, personnel, or ammunition. While Mulele was strict in his ideology, many of his forces were not. Largely tribal farmers and workers, they were often difficult to control. Many of the people that Mulele recruited were not only very militant in favoring civil disobedience, but also radical in their attitude toward Belgian colonial authority and the Congolese government. The rebels also used witchcraft extensively to demoralize their opponents. The rebels are reported to have used machetes, poisoned arrows, homemade bombs, and guns as weapons. However, they were limited as to the effectiveness of their weapons. They lacked weaponry, and that which they possessed was often in disrepair.

Mulele began in 1963 by recruiting young men in the regions of Gungu and Idiofa. He taught them basic politics and military tactics, alongside the help of deserters from the Congolese army. The training included physical preparation, guerilla tactics, espionage, alongside ideological indoctrination. Prior to the start of the rebellion in 1964, a number of rebels were sent to various villages within the Kwilu district to indoctrinate, intimidate, and coerce villagers into supporting the cause.

=== Mulelism ===
The political and ideological doctrine of Pierre Mulele acted as a backbone of the rebellion, and was followed by many of his troops. It offered a doctrine as to the problems facing the Congo, and an idyllic vision of what was to be done about them. The main tenets of the doctrine include:

- The laws of a country are to protect the well-being of all.
- The government of the Congo is poor, protecting their own and keeping wealth to themselves, treating the common people as 'slaves'.
- The people are divided into two classes: (1) the rich, the capitalists, who profit from the work of others. (2) Workers and peasants: the poor, or the "popular masses".
- All the wealth in the country is controlled by foreigners.
- The two classes are in a constant struggle. Either a struggle to diminish suffering, or a struggle to reform and reorganize the country.
- All men, no matter what their status and work, were once village people.
- The people of the villages must fight against the government, soldiers, and police, to overthrow the government and establish a new regime in which all must work in order to eat; in which foreigners cannot come to take the wealth of the country; and in which one cannot steal the wealth of another person.

== Rebel activity 1963–1965 ==
The rebellion began in August 1963, though its initial actions were limited in scope. The conflict escalated on 16 January 1964, as rebels rose up in the cities of Idiofa and Gungu in Kwilu Province. A series of incidents began to occur, carried out by rebels. A Molotov cocktail was thrown into the home of a professor, and two policemen were killed. Rebels attacked the Portuguese palm oil refinery of Lutshima-Madail, and burned five of the company trucks, believed to have been used to transport soldiers of the National Congolese Army. On 23 January, rebels attacked a Christian mission, killing three pastors. From this point onwards, religious, government, and industrial agencies were key targets for rebels. On 5 February, the chief of staff of the ANC was ambushed and killed. In the first weeks of the rebellion, hundreds of police and government workers were killed by Kwilu rebels, often in public executions. As violence increased and attacks became more frequent, it sparked similar uprisings throughout the country, triggering the Simba rebellion. The rebels began to expand their territory and rapidly advance northwards, capturing Port-Émpain, Stanleyville, Paulis and Lisala between July and August. As they advanced, the rebels began to gain a psychological edge over the ANC troops. This was largely due to the claims of magic possessed by Mulele and the rebels; that they were invulnerable, and that bullets would turn to water upon impact with rebel soldiers.

As they advanced, the rebels committed numerous massacres in the captured territory in order to remove political opposition and terrorise the population. A number of Western missionaries were forced to retreat and flee the country. A small force of peacekeepers was sent to the Kwilu region to retrieve fleeing missionaries. Rescue operations continued throughout the middle of 1964, and resulted in the successful recovery of over 100 missionaries. In some cases, the revolt was aided by villagers, who resented the presence of Congolese troops. Certain cities in the Kwilu region were evacuated, with the help of UN forces.

During the early months of the rebellion, attacks were generally planned and systematic. The people, villages, and institutions attacked were determined by the Mulelist value system. Government, administrative, and wealthy individuals were targeted first. However, as the rebellion continued it became more destructive, and less subject to the ideals, influence, and standards of Mulelism, as well as its leaders. Murder, pillaging, and attacking women became more prevalent as time passed. This became particularly apparent after Europeans were evacuated from Kwilu, and the Congolese army arrived.

The United Nations Operation in the Congo (ONUC), a peacekeeping operation, was in the process of withdrawing when the Kwilu rebellion started and had only 5,500 personnel, most whom were deployed in the eastern part of the country and stranded by the subsequent Simba rebellion there. Straggling Western missionaries from Kwilu retreated through the bush to their respective embassies, which in turn requested UN assistance. In late January 1964 ONUC Chief of Staff Jacques Dextraze assembled a small force of peacekeepers and dispatched them to the Kwilu region to retrieve fleeing missionaries. Acting with the support of Congolese forces, ONUC forces engaged rebels in Kwilu on multiple occasions before landing helicopters to evacuate missionaries and Western aid workers. Rescue operations continued throughout March and April and resulted in the successful recovery of over 100 missionaries. Apart from these actions ONUC played no other role in suppressing the rebellion.

After the rebellion's early successes, the Congolese government called for international aid in dealing with Mulele and his troops. Squads of foreign mercenaries, and 350 Belgian paratroopers were flown into the Congo. These trained forces began to quickly retake areas captured by the rebels. Foreign mercenaries alongside ANC troops enacted a scorched earth policy in order to isolate Kwilu rebels. They razed villages and destroyed harvests, often committing massacres of civilians. Notably, in Kikwit over 3,000 civilians were killed in a day, during an event nicknamed 'the National Butchery of Kikwit' by Colonel Joseph Monzimba.

After a number of successes for the rebels, issues began to arise when trying to sustain control over captured territory. Corruption, administrative inefficiency, and ethnic favoritism turned out to be liabilities for the rebel leaders as much as they had been for previous provincial administrators. Competing ethnic tensions were seen by many as a return to tribalism. By the beginning of 1965, the majority of captured areas were retaken, and the rebellion was starting to be put down. During this time, hunger and disease began to spread throughout the province, and remaining support for the rebellion began to wane.

Pierre Mulele fled into exile in 1965, and would remain there for a number of years until his death.

After the defeat of the Kwilu rebellion, rebel remnants continued to be active in certain parts of the country. These had little impact on the government, however, and were confined to rural areas. The rebellion had significant casualties. Those killed in ANC "pacification" operations have not been concretely established, with 60–70,000 killed by ANC operations to suppress the Kwilu Rebellion alone. In the next few years, small outbursts of violence continued around the Kwilu region, although without the planning and coordination of the rebellion itself. In 1968, president Mobutu lured Mulele out of exile with the promise of amnesty. However, when Mulele returned expecting safety, he was publicly tortured and executed. On 10 November 1968 government declared the rebellion to be over.

== Aftermath and political impact ==
After the provincial government was restored on 18 January 1966, the Kwilu province was merged with the Kwango District and Mai-Ndombe District to create Bandundu Province, as part of a national effort to reduce political and ethnic tensions. The wider Congo crisis during which the Kwilu rebellion occurred is considered a significant event in Congo's recent history. It is viewed as a representation of Western influence and power in Africa. Of the numerous struggles faced by Congo in the years after its independence, the Kwilu rebellion was particularly impactful, as political conflict penetrated deeply in the villages and rural areas for the first time. The Kwilu rebellion coincided with a wide escalation of the Cold War amid the Gulf of Tonkin incident, and many believe that a "full-scale American military intervention could have occurred" as in Vietnam if the rebellion was not swiftly defeated. And in August 2024, four missionary priests martyred on 28 November 1964, were beatified by Pope Francis.
