= Georgy Lukich Smirnov =

Soviet-Russian political scientist (1945–1999)

- Born: November 14, 1922; Oktyabrsky District
- Died: November 29, 1999 (aged 77); Moscow
- Education: Doktor Nauk in Philosophy
- Alma mater: Volgograd State Pedagogical University
- Employer: agitprop; Institute of Philosophy; Kommunist; Marx–Engels–Lenin Institute
- Awards: Medal "For the Defence of Stalingrad"

Georgy Lukich Smirnov (Russian: Георгий Лукич Смирнов; 14 November 1945, in Volgograd Oblast - 29 November 1999, in Moscow) was a Soviet Russian political scientist. Doktor Nauk in Philosophical Sciences, Professor, Academician of the Academy of Sciences of the USSR (since 1987). He was director of the Institute of Philosophy, Russian Academy of Sciences (1983–1985). He was director of the Marx–Engels–Lenin Institute (1987–1991). Candidate for membership in the Central Committee of the CPSU (since 1970).

Member of the Communist Party of the Soviet Union since 1943.

He graduated from the Faculty of History of Volgograd State Pedagogical University in 1952.

He was elected a corresponding member of the Academy of Sciences of the USSR in 1981.
