= International Commission of Inquiry Into the 1932–1933 Famine in Ukraine =

The International Commission of Inquiry Into the 1932–1933 Famine in Ukraine was set up in 1984 and was initiated by the World Congress of Free Ukrainians to study and investigate the 1932-1933 man-made famine that killed millions in Ukraine. Members of Commission selected and invited by World Congress of Free Ukrainians. None of them represent own country or country authority/institution and act as individual. Most of them (5 out of 7) are retired jurists, one of them (Colonel G.I.A.D. Draper) died before Commission finish their investigations. The Commission was funded by donations from the worldwide Ukrainian diaspora.

The idea for the formation of an International Commission to investigate 1932-1933 Famine in Ukraine was suggested by Toronto lawyer V.-Yu. Danyliv at the 4th Conference of the World Congress of Free Ukrainians held in December 1983. According to the resolution the commission was to be initiated in New York City in December 1984 and headed by Ignat Bilinsky. Danyliv consulted with justice John Sopinka, lawyers Pavlo Chumak, Alexandra Chyczij, Stepan Rozsokha and the Canadian Minister for Justice. The Commission had its first meeting in May 1988 in Brussels and was chaired by Professor emeritus Jacob Sundberg. His findings were delivered to the UN Under-Secretary for Human Rights in Geneva on May 9, and to the President of the Parliamentary Assembly of the Council of Europe on May 10, 1990.

== Documentary evidence exhibits entered into Commission ==
Documentary evidence exhibits entered into Commission presented predominantly by World Congress of Free Ukrainians, including “Harvest of Sorrow” by Robert Conquest and many other documents by same author, James Mace as also books Ukrainian Diaspora like “Ukrainian Holocaust of 1933” by Wasyl Hryshko, “Black Deeds of Kremlin” 2 Vol by Dobrus and Pidhaynyy, V.Kubiyovych work etc.

The Commission also examined Douglas Tottle's controversial book Fraud, Famine, and Fascism: the Ukrainian Genocide Myth from Hitler to Harvard, in which he asserts that claims the Holodomor was an intentional genocide are "fraudulent", and "a creation of Nazi propagandists". Tottle was invited by the commission to attend the hearings, however he ignored the request. The commission president Professor Jacob Sundberg subsequently concluded that Tottle was not alone in his enterprise to deny the famine on the basis that material included in his book could not have been available to a private person without official Soviet assistance.

== Conclusions ==
The World Congress of Free Ukrainians as petitioner invited a commission to investigate whether the famine was an act of genocide, and gave a number of different opinions on various subjects, with some participants differing on certain points. However, the majority of the Commissioners (5 out of 6) deemed it plausible that the constituent elements of genocide were in existence at the time of the famine.

In the commission's final report, published in 1990, it reached some of the following conclusions:

- It can hardly be expected that there is written evidence of Stalin's intentions to doom the people to starvation in order to implement his policy. In such circumstances, the evidence is usually based on various indications, provided that they are sufficiently convincing and unequivocally establish the presence or absence of a preconceived plan.
- The famine in Ukraine took place from August–September 1932 to July 1933. The commission stated that a minimum of 4.5 million victims (while assumed Ukrainians as sole nation and inhabitants of the Ukrainian SSR) perished with an additional three million outside the Ukrainian SSR. The responsibility of the famine was placed on the central government of the USSR which the commission concluded various Soviet authorities "carried out those measures that for 10 months occasioned a dire shortage of foodstuffs in Ukraine."
- The Commission stressed that "the policies applied to the Ukrainian people and led to the famine of 1932–33 disregard the precepts of basic morality which are binding on Soviet as on all authorities, and that the Soviet authorities must in consequence be vigorously condemned."
- Based on the Soviet population censuses taken before and after the famine years (1926 and 1939 respectively), Ukraine lost over 3 million of the existing population (-9.9%), plus another 3 million minimum lost natural population growth; the decline contrasts sharply with the rise of 11.3% in neighboring Belarus and of 15.7% for the Soviet Union as a whole.
- Logically, there is no definite connection between grain procurement, collectivization, dispossession and denationalization. However, it is highly probable that they indeed were part of one plan. It is highly unlikely that these methods, applied simultaneously, did not pursue a common goal if it was not ultimately aimed at the welfare of society and its members. The Commission considers that, in all likelihood, grain purchases, collectivization, dispossession and denationalization pursued a common, if not the only goal.
- The majority of cities and towns managed to avoid the famine, as did the local rural authorities responsible for securing grain supplies and carrying out collectivization. It is clear that among the inhabitants of cities and towns there were many non-Ukrainians, and the rural authorities were often represented by Russians.
- The commission majority was unable to affirm the existence of a preconceived plan to organize a famine in Ukraine, in order to ensure the success of Moscow’s policy. However, they concluded it is very likely that "the Soviet authorities sought, under the direction of Stalin, to capitalize on the famine once it started. While the famine was not premeditated, however much the authorities wanted to impose repressive policies, the will to strike the Ukrainian peasantry appears to have existed when the famine broke out in the autumn of 1932."
- The commission considers justified its opinion that the genocide against the Ukrainian people took place and violated the norms of international law at that time.

The final report was also published in Russian: The International Commission of Inquiry famine in Ukraine years 1932-1933 Final Report in 1990, Kiev - 1992 (Международная комиссия по расследованию голода на Украине 1932—1933 годов Итоговый отчёт 1990 г., Киев −1992).

The only dissenting opinion came from Professor Sundberg, who argued that:

"the evidence shows that the famine situation was well-known in Moscow from the bottom to the top. Very little or nothing was done to provide some relief to the starving masses. On the contrary, a great deal was done to deny the famine, to make it invisible to visitors, and to prevent relief being brought.
