= Catherine Abbo =

Ugandan researcher, doctor, academic administrator (born 1971)

Associate Professor Catherine Abbo
- Born: Catherine Abbo; 1972 (age 53–54); Uganda
- Education: Makerere University (Bachelor of Medicine in Medicine and Surgery); Makerere University (Master of Medicine in Psychiatry) (Joint PhD in Transcultural Psychiatry); Makerere University; Karolinska Institute (Master in Philosophy in Child and Adolescent Psychiatry); University of Cape Town (Fellow); College of Medicine of South Africa
- Occupations: researcher, Medical doctor, and academic
- Years active: 1998—present
- Title: Associate Professor in the Department of Psychiatry, School of Medicine, College of Health Sciences, at Makerere University

Catherine Abbo (born 1972) is a Ugandan researcher, medical doctor and academic. She is currently serving as a lecturer in the Department of Psychiatry, School of Medicine, College of Health Sciences at Makerere University.

== Education ==
She graduated from Makerere University with a Bachelor of Medicine and surgery, a Masters degree in Psychiatry from Makerere University, a joint PhD in Transcultural Psychiatry from Makerere University and Karolinska Institute, in Sweden (2005-2009). Her Master of Philosophy in Child and Adolescent Psychiatry from University of Cape (2012-2014). She is a fellow of College of Medicine of South Africa.

== Career ==
Abbo did her medical internship at Mulago hospital in Kampala after she served as a Medical Officer in Butabika National Mental Referral Hospital. In June 2006, Abbo joined Makerere University as an Assistant lecturer in the Department of Psychiatry. She is a visiting lecturer at Gulu University in faculty of Medicine.

== Research ==
She has published the finding of her research in Child and Adolescent, Psychiatry and Mental Health and Transcultural Psychiatry in medical journals and other peer publications hence cited with an H-index of 46 with 847 citations and has thus published research findings in over 67 peer-reviewed journal Scientific publications. She was awarded the Young Minds Award 2005 in Psychiatry by American Psychiatric Association in International Category

She serves as the President Elect Uganda Psychiatric Association, chairperson for UMA SACCO, chairperson for Governing Council at Butabika School of Psychiatric Clinical Officers.
