= Jussuf Abbo =

Jewish sculptor (1890 – 1953)

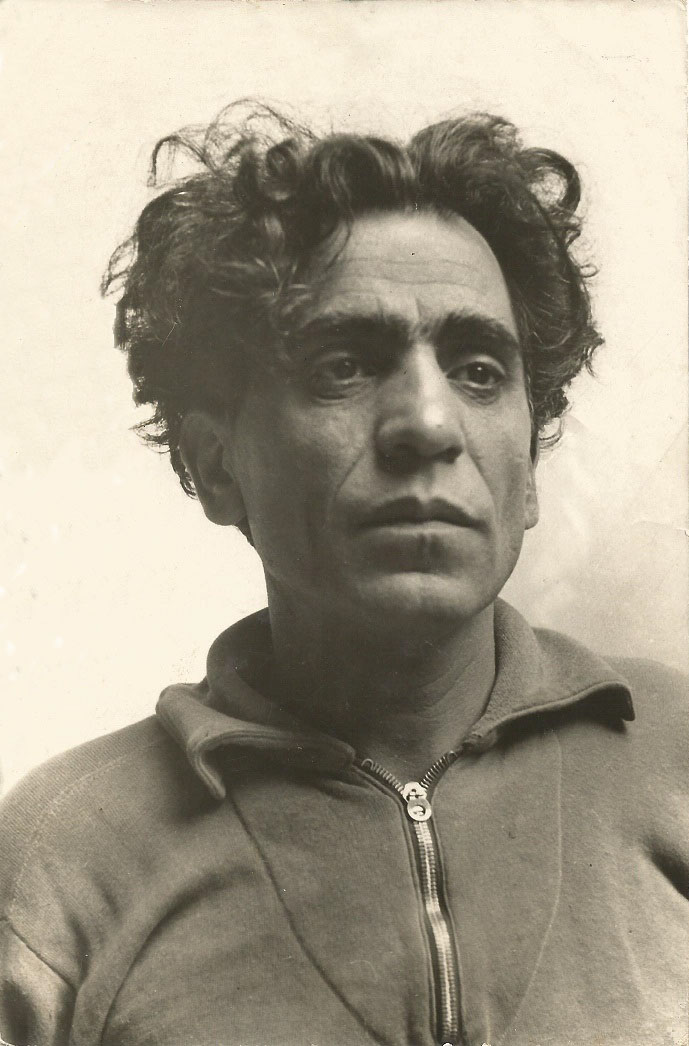
- Jussuf Abbo in his 40s
- Born: Jussuff Abbu; 14 February 1890; Safed (Ottoman Palestine)
- Died: 29 August 1953 (aged 63); London (United Kingdom)
- Known for: Sculpture, printmaking

Jussuf Abbo, originally Jussuff Abbu, (14 February 1890 – 29 August 1953) was a Jewish visual artist from Ottoman Palestine. His mediums included printmaking and sculpture. He was active mainly in Germany until fleeing to England in 1935 due to Nazi persecution.

== Biography ==
Jussuf Abbo was born in Safed, Ottoman Palestine to a large Jewish family of farmworkers. He showed academic and artistic talent from a young age and he won a scholarship to attend the Alliance Israelite Universelle school in Jerusalem. As a young man he was employed as a stonemason by German architect Otto Hoffmann in Jerusalem from 1909–10 who, recognizing his talent, arranged for him to study at the Berlin University of the Arts. Abbo arrived in Germany in 1911 and began studying at the Royal Academy of Applied Arts in Berlin in 1913 where he studied drawing, painting and sculpture.

By 1919 he had a master studio at the Academy of Arts, Berlin and became and active member of the Berlin avant-garde artistic circles as he was a member of the Deutscher Künstlerbund (Association of German Artists), whose 25th annual exhibition (1929 in Cologne's "Staatenhaus") featured a bronze female torso and a lead casting by him. Abbo participated in 1923 in a major collective exhibition at the Ferdinand Möller art salon in Berlin, and another important international exhibition in 1926 at the Galerie Neue Kunst Fides in Dresden. In the 1920s, Abbo belonged to the circle of friends of Else Lasker-Schüler, whom he portrayed several times and who in turn wrote a poem about him. He worked as a sculptor and printmaker and fired his ceramic works in the workshops of fellow Berlin artists Otto Douglas Douglas-Hill and Jan Bontjes van Beek.

In 1935, being stateless due to the dissolution of the Ottoman Empire in the early 1920s, Abbo managed to obtain Egyptian nationality. He then fled from Nazi Germany to England with his wife Ruth Schulz. He had to leave his work behind and was thus prevented from presenting it in exhibitions in London and gaining a foothold in his new country.

In 1937, whilst some of Abbo's sculptures finally arrived in England, in Germany his work had been branded as Degenerate Art and removed from all public museums. Much of the work removed was later destroyed by the Nazi regime. In the same year, he won an important commission to sculpt a portrait bust of the British politician George Lansbury. In 1939, he cast the Lansbury bust in Paris, where he also met the French sculptor Charles Despiau. During the war, he was unable to work in his studio in London and made a living with odd jobs and by selling antiques. At the end of the war in 1945, he was not able to keep his studio and as a result destroyed most of the works created in England because of a lack of storage space and out of frustration and disappointment. Financial hardship, forced emigration, war and difficult working conditions ended up adversely affecting Abbo's physical and mental health. He died in a London hospital on 29 August 1953 following a lengthy illness.

== Work ==
The distinctive feature of Abbo's sculpture work is a subtle sensitivity to the physiognomy and emotional state of his subjects, an understated focus on expression, posture and attitude. As well as sculptures, he also produced over a thousand figurative drawings and prints, almost always portraits and nudes. Much of Abbo's work, being partially abstract with emphasis on psychological state and emotion, can be considered "Expressionist".

== Bibliography ==
- Hüneke, Andreas: Abbo, Jussuff. In: Allgemeines Künstlerlexikon. Die Bildenden Künstler aller Zeiten und Völker (AKL). Band 1 [General encyclopedia of artists. The visual artists of all times and peoples (AKL). Volume 1], Seemann, Leipzig 1983, p. 61, ISBN 3-598-22741-8.
- Dogramaci, Burcu: Jussufs gedicht für Jussuf Abbo [Jussuf's poem for Jussuf Abbo] in Der blaue Reiter ist gefallen [The blue rider has fallen]: Else-Lasker-Schüler anniversary almanac, Hammer, 2015, pp. 275–277 (contribution about the friendship between Else Lasker-Schüler and Jussuf Abbo), ISBN 978-3-7795-0532-7.
- Wächter, Anja / Mieves, Esther: Jussuf Abbo in New /old homeland: R/Emigration of artists after 1945, Kunsthaus Dahlem, 2017, pp. 160–166, ISBN 978-3-9816615-4-5.
- Dickson, Rachel / Macdougall, Sarah: Forced Journeys: Artists In Exile In Britain c.1933-45, Ben Uri Gallery, 2009, ISBN 978-0-9001571-3-4.
- Abbo (Schulz), Ruth: Über den Verlust einer kunstkerischen Existenz - Jussuf Abbo im Exil [Losing one's Artistic Existence - Jussuf Abbo in Exile] in KUNST IM EXIL in Großbritannien 1933-45 [Artists in Exile in Great Britain 1933-45], Frölich & Kaufmann, 1986, ISBN 3-88725-218-7. A translation of this article in English is available online. See external link below.
