= Abo, New Mexico =

Unincorporated community in Torrance County, New Mexico

- Unincorporated community
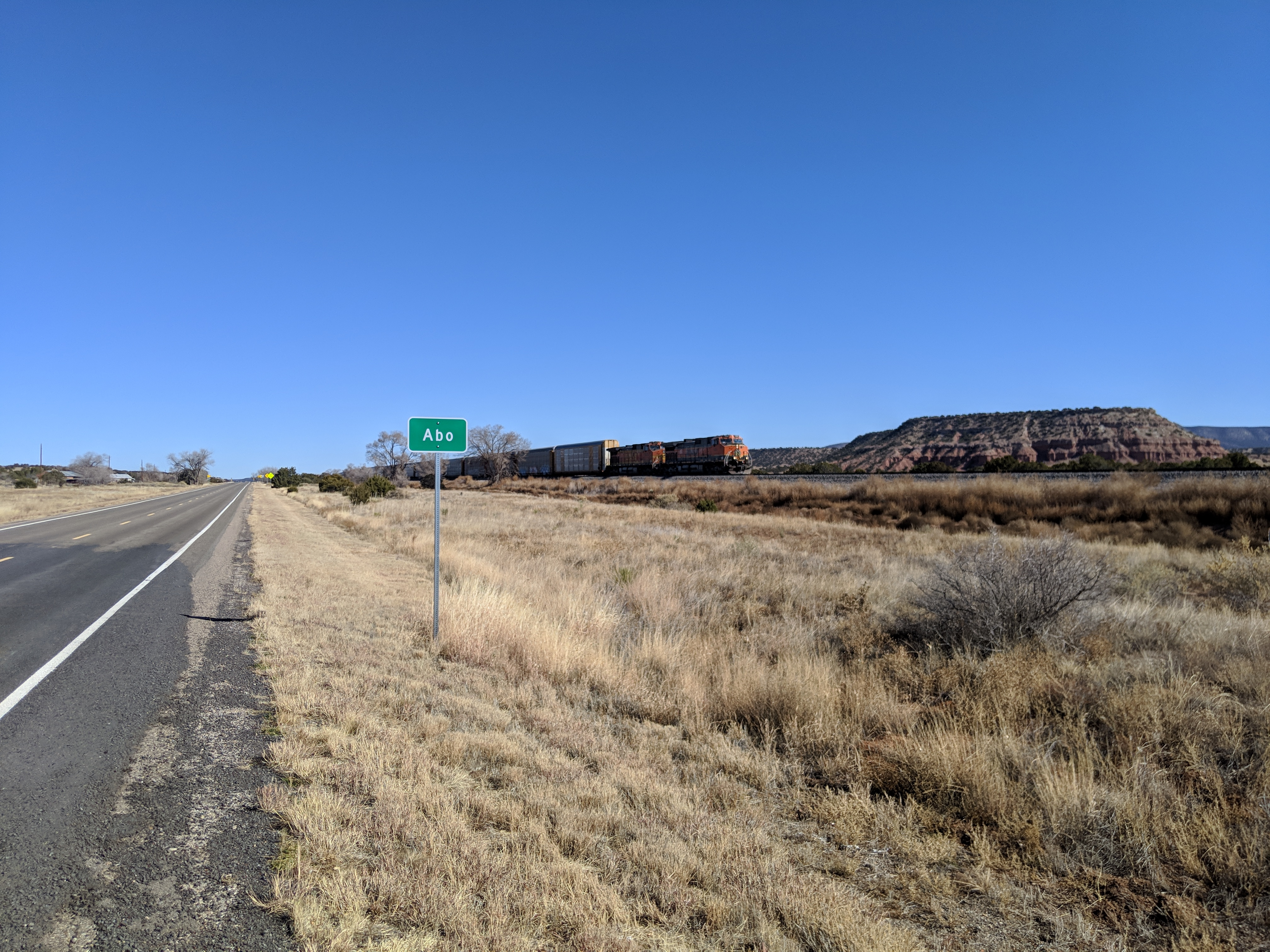

- Location within New Mexico
- Coordinates: 34°27′21″N 106°19′59″W
- Country: United States
- State: New Mexico
- County: Torrance
- Time zone: Mountain (MST)

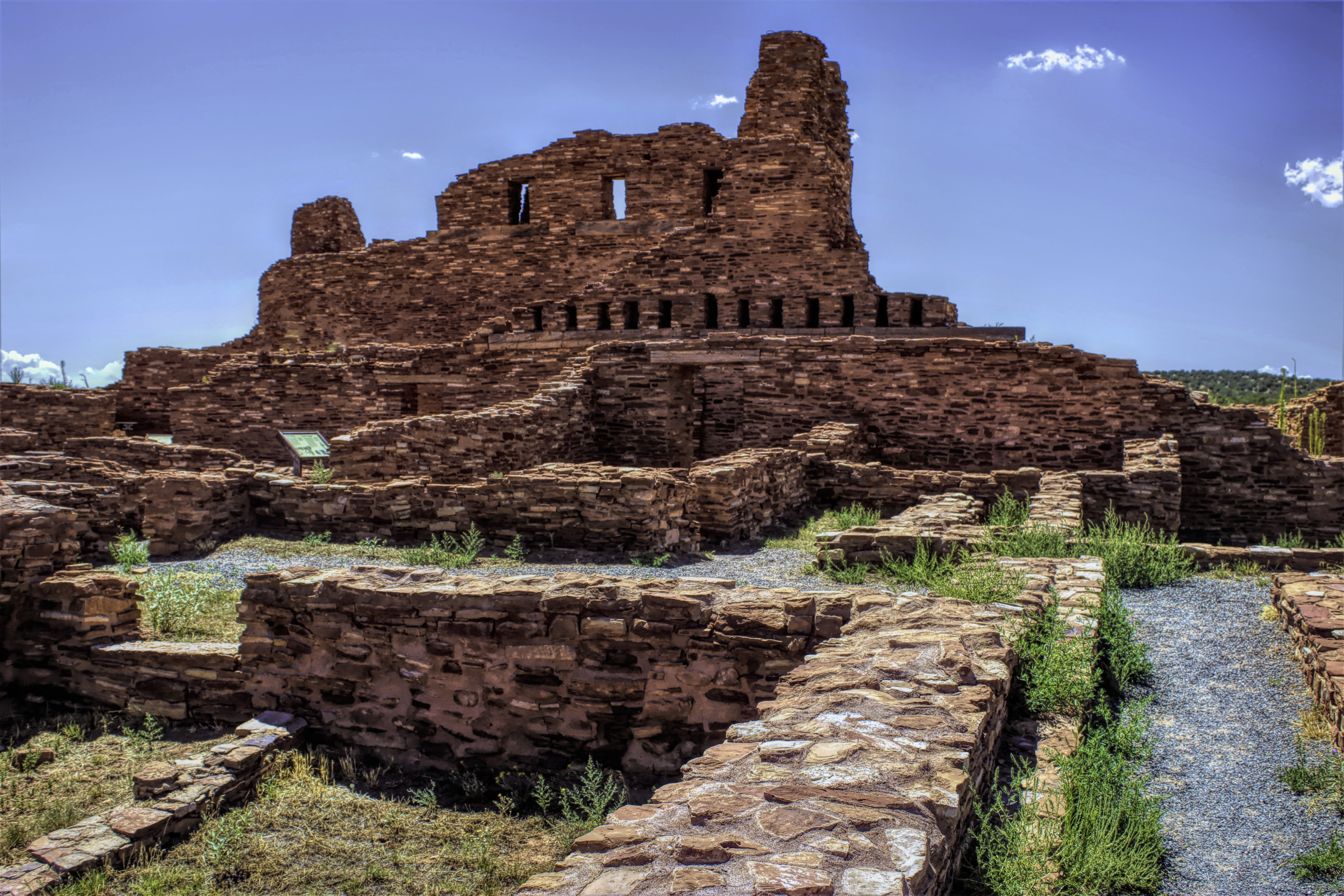
Abo Mission church ruins

Abo is an unincorporated community in Torrance County, New Mexico, United States, located on U.S. Route 60. It is the nearest community to Abo, a pueblo and mission ruin of the same name that is a National Historic Landmark. A post office was operated here from 1910 to 1914.

== Geography and geology ==
The geography around Abo is defined by the red sandstone in low mesas and stream cuts.

There is natural gas in the rocks below Abo; trimethyl-arsine and organoarsine sulfides are contaminants in the pipelines.

== History ==
A Spanish mission church was built at Abo in about 1630, but destroyed circa 1670, or possibly as late as 1678, and named for San Gregorio by Father Acevedo. The Rev. Francisco Acevedo was a missionary to the Pueblo people nearby, who abandoned the Abo area for the Rio Grande valley after a drought and attacks by the Apache. Little is left of Native American presence except the ruins of the church, and a few petroglyphs, including several of kachinas, and one of Kokopelli.

A railroad arrived in 1912, and for almost three decades, Abo was a small but thriving town with its own post office and school, but by 1940, was abandoned again. In 1933, a posse of over 200 men was unable to locate a fugitive hiding in the arroyos and badlands around Abo.

Maud S. Hawk Wright Medders (1889-1980) was kidnapped by Pancho Villa in 1916; she died at her ranch in Abo on Christmas Day, 1980.

== Nearby communities ==
- Mountainair - Approximately 7.2 miles northeast.
- Estancia - Approximately 30.2 miles northeast
- Belen - Approximately 36 miles northwest
- Moriarty - Approximately 46.1 miles north-northeast
- Los Lunas, New Mexico - Approximately 46.4 miles northwest

== Transportation ==
=== Major airports ===
- Estancia Municipal Airport - Nearest regional airport, around 30.6 miles northeast.
- Albuquerque International Sunport - Nearest major airport, around 67 miles north-northwest.

=== Major highways ===
- U.S. Route 60 - Runs adjacent to the community.
