= Douglas Tottle =

Canadian trade union activist and journalist

Douglas Tottle (born 1944) is a Canadian trade union activist and journalist. He is most notable for being the author of the book Fraud, Famine, and Fascism: The Ukrainian Genocide Myth from Hitler to Harvard. The book argues that Soviet famine of 1930–1933 in the Soviet Union was not the “deliberately planned genocide of Ukrainians by the Soviet government”, but a historical misrepresentation sourced from Ukrainian fascists and anti-Soviet organizations in the West. It cast the "fraud" as originated by the German Nazis, and perpetuated by the CIA along with Harvard University.

Tottle's critics regard him as a "Soviet apologist", or a "denunciator" of the famine. Tottle has been defended by a number of pro-Soviet groups and individuals including the Stalin Society, author Jeff Coplon, Medieval English literature professor Grover Furr, and the Swedish Communist Party. Tottle's work was submitted to the International Commission of Inquiry Into the 1932–33 Famine in Ukraine and was examined as evidence during the Brussels sitting of the commission.

== Biography ==
Tottle was born in Quebec, but later lived mainly in Western Canada. He had various jobs throughout his working life, including photo-lab technician, fine artist, miner and steelworker. As a trade union activist, he edited The Challenger, a journal of the United Steelworkers, from 1975 to 1985. Tottle also researched labour history and worked as a union organiser, for example among Chicano farm workers in California and Canadian Indian farm workers in Manitoba. Tottle has written for various Canadian and American publications. Notably, Tottle has no academic background to speak of or training in the study of history or related fields.

== Fraud, Famine, and Fascism ==
Douglas Tottle is mostly known for his book Fraud, Famine, and Fascism: the Ukrainian Genocide Myth from Hitler to Harvard in which he argues that the theory that the Soviet famine of 1932–33 was intentionally orchestrated by the USSR, was a creation of Nazis propagandists, thence perpetuated in America by newspaper magnate William Randolph Hearst. Tottle argues that although mistakes in Soviet economic policy were contributors to the famine, other factors including kulak sabotage, hoarding of grain, weather conditions and foreign sanctions also contributed.

Tottle writes that he is more interested in the "Nazi and fascist connections" and the "coverups of wartime collaboration". In 1988, the International Commission of Inquiry Into the 1932–33 Famine in Ukraine was set up to establish whether the famine existed and its cause. Tottle was invited by the commission to attend the hearings, but did not respond. Tottle's book was examined during the Brussels sitting of the commission, held between May 23–27, 1988, with testimony from various expert witnesses. Commission president Jacob Sundberg subsequently concluded that Tottle was not alone in doubting a "famine-genocide", alluding to the fact that material included in his book could not have been made available without official Soviet assistance. However, Sundberg also concluded that "the evidence shows that the famine situation was well-known in Moscow from the bottom to the top. Very little or nothing was done to provide some relief to the starving masses. On the contrary, a great deal was done to deny the famine, to make it invisible to visitors, and to prevent relief being brought."

Anne Applebaum wrote that institutes of the Soviet government contributed to its writing, reviewed manuscripts and that Soviet diplomats also promoted the book. She also states that this may have been a political response to the publication of Robert Conquest's The Harvest of Sorrow in the preceding year.
