= Grover Furr =

American author and literature professor (born 1944)

- Born: April 3, 1944 (age 82)
- Education: McGill University (BA); Princeton University (Ph.D.)
- Occupation: Professor of Medieval English literature
- Known for: Historically revisionist writing on Stalin-era Soviet Union

Grover Carr Furr III (born April 3, 1944) is an American professor of Medieval English literature at Montclair State University and writer on the Stalin-era Soviet Union. He is best known for his historically revisionist views on the subject. Furr has written books, papers, and articles about Soviet history, especially the Stalin era, in which he has stated that the Holodomor, the 1932–33 famine in the Ukrainian Soviet Socialist Republic, was not deliberate, describing it as a fiction created by pro-Nazi Ukrainian nationalists, that the Katyn massacre was committed by the Nazi Schutzstaffel and not the Soviet NKVD, that all defendants in the Moscow Trials were guilty as charged, that claims in Nikita Khrushchev's speech On the Cult of Personality and Its Consequences are almost entirely false, that the purpose of the Molotov–Ribbentrop Pact was to preserve the Second Polish Republic rather than partition it, and that the Soviet Union did not invade Poland in September 1939, on the grounds that the Polish state no longer existed. Furr claims that the mainstream narrative of the Soviet Union and in particular the Stalin era is biased and that many of the claims by mainstream historians are unfounded, because they follow "anti-Stalin paradigm".

== Career ==
Grover Furr graduated from McGill University, with a BA in English and received his Ph.D. degree from Princeton University. He has been on the faculty at Montclair State University in New Jersey, specializing in Medieval English literature.

== Views ==
=== Holodomor ===
In a CounterPunch article published in March 2017, Furr argues that "[t]here was a very serious famine in the USSR, including (but not limited to) the Ukrainian SSR, in 1932–33. But there has never been any evidence of a 'Holodomor' or 'deliberate famine,' and there is none today. The 'Holodomor' fiction was invented by Ukrainian Nazi collaborators who found havens in Western Europe, Canada, and the USA after the war."

=== Moscow Trials ===
Contrary to the widely accepted view that the Moscow Trials were a series of show trials held at the instigation of Joseph Stalin between 1936 and 1938 against Trotskyists and members of Right Opposition of the Communist Party of the Soviet Union, Furr believes that all defendants in the Moscow Trials were at least guilty of what they were charged, as argued in a 2017 article for Journal of Labor and Society, a quarterly journal published by Brill.

=== Molotov–Ribbentrop Pact ===
In 2012, Furr stated that the Molotov–Ribbentrop Pact was signed by the Soviet Union to preserve an independent Poland rather than planning a partition of Poland, as was in fact stipulated in the secret protocol of the Molotov–Ribbentrop Pact between Nazi Germany and the Soviet Union. Furr argues that Britain and France also signed the Munich Agreement, a nonaggression pact with Germany that partitioned another state and that Poland too took part in the partition of Czechoslovakia, making the Soviet Union not unique in its signing of a non-aggression pact with Germany. Furr criticises the Polish government in exile, arguing that it should have remained somewhere in Poland "at least long enough to surrender" or could have fled to Britain or France rather than in neutral Romania. In Furr's words, "[a] 'rump' Poland might finally have agreed to make a mutual defense pact that included the USSR. That would have restarted 'collective security', the anti-Nazi alliance between the Western Allies and the USSR that the Soviets sought but UK and French leaders rejected." According to Furr, this would have "greatly weakened Hitler; probably eliminating much of the Jewish Holocaust; certainly preventing the conquest of France, Belgium, and the rest of Europe; [and] certainly prevented many millions of deaths of Soviet citizens".

=== Soviet invasion of Poland ===
Regarding the Soviet invasion of Poland in September 1939, Furr stated in 2009 that the Soviet Union did not actually invade the Second Polish Republic because Poland no longer had a government and was not a state according to international law, further stating that "at the time it was widely acknowledged that no such invasion occurred." Furr believes that the state Poland no longer existed because the Polish government was interned in Romania, although it continued to be recognized by all Allied powers. According to Furr, the Polish government did not declare war on the Soviet Union and only declared war on Nazi Germany, as did Britain and France. Britain did not demand that Soviet Union withdraw its troops and France had a mutual defense treaty with Poland. Secondly, the Polish General Inspector of the Armed Forces Edward Rydz-Śmigły ordered Polish soldiers not to fight the Soviets and instead to continue fighting the Germans while the Polish president Ignacy Mościcki, who was interned in Romania since September 17, 1939, tacitly admitted that Poland no longer had a government and maintained its stance of neutrality. Finally, Furr notes that the League of Nations did not determine the Soviet Union had invaded a member state and accepted the Soviet declaration of neutrality while it voted to expel the Soviets when the Soviet Union attacked Finland in the Winter War.

=== Katyn Massacre ===
Contrary to the historical consensus and as stated by both the Soviet Union (in 1991) and the Russian Federation (in 2004), Furr denies Soviet complicity in the Katyn massacre, arguing in a 2013 article in the Marxist journal Socialism and Democracy that the Katyn massacre was committed by the Nazi Schutzstaffel rather than by the Soviet NKVD. In 2010, Furr said that he believed the widely accepted view until the discoveries in the mass graves at Volodymyr-Volynskyi, which he says prove his thesis, although this has been criticized by some. According to Furr, some Poles that were implicated in Polish war crimes against Soviet POWs during 1919–1921, were likely killed by the Soviets while Nazis shot the others later. Furr cites a 1985 interview of Lazar Kaganovich in which he stated that the Soviets shot 3,200 Poles – all of whom were guilty of capital crimes.

=== "Khrushchev Lied" ===
Furr's book Khrushchev Lied, subtitled "The Evidence that Every Revelation of Stalin's (and Beria's) Crimes in Nikita Khrushchev's Infamous Secret Speech to the 20th Party Congress of the Communist Party of the Soviet Union on February 25, 1956, Is Provably False", attacked the speech given by Nikita Khrushchev called "On the Cult of Personality and Its Consequences", more commonly referred to in the West as the "Secret Speech" because it was delivered at an unpublicized closed session of party delegates, with guests and members of the press excluded.

According to a review by Gregory Elich in the Marxist academic journal Science & Society, "it would be too much to expect from Furr to live up to his claim that not one specific statement by Khrushschev turned out to be true", that Furr's dislike of Khrushschev "often interferes with his analysis," and that the arguments by Furr about all defendants of Moscow Trials being guilty do not survive fact checking. Elich writes that "Furr demolishes Khrushchev's points" regarding the assessment of Stalin as a wartime commander.

=== Disagreement with historians ===
Furr has denied findings by mainstream historians of the Soviet Union, such as Robert Conquest, Timothy Snyder, and Stephen Kotkin.

== Reception ==
Historians John Earl Haynes and Harvey Klehr stated that Furr "lauded the creation of Communist regimes" in Europe and Asia because "billions of workers all over the world are exploited, murdered, tortured, oppressed by capitalism." In response to Furr's critical review, historian Gerald Meyer of Hostos Community College wrote that "Furr defends the Soviet state's expulsion of the Volga Germans, Tartars, [sic] Chechens, and other ethnic minorities from their homelands", "objects to my contention that collectivization of agriculture resulted in widespread resistance and famine", and "spends most of his energy attempting to refute the truism that Stalin was aware of and approved of huge numbers of political executions."

Cathy Young, describing Furr in an article for The Daily Beast as "a 'revisionist' on a career-long quest to exonerate Stalin", said that Furr's work, along with that of Douglas Tottle, was being used as part of a larger propaganda campaign by the Russian government to muddy the waters and obfuscate the history of Soviet crimes.

Historian Jarosław Szarek, president of the Polish Institute of National Remembrance, condemned Furr's work as denying Soviet war crimes, comparing it to "the scandalous manifestations of Holocaust denial."

During a public debate at a university campus in 2012, Furr was quoted as saying: "I have yet to find one crime — yet to find one crime — that Stalin committed. ... I know they all say he killed 20, 30, 40 million people — it is bullshit. ... Goebbels said that the Big Lie is successful and this is the Big Lie: that the Communists — that Stalin killed millions of people and that socialism is no good." Both The American Conservative and the Washington Examiner wrote that Furr referred to Nazi propaganda because a mediator of the discussion suggested that Furr was using tactics invented by Joseph Goebbels.

Marxist historian Douglas Greene, in his book In Stalin's Shadow, noted that Furr's work was popular among Marxist-Leninists, many of whom praised him "as a serious researcher who has exposed lies, falsehoods, and unsubstantiated claims." However, Greene criticized Furr for faulty methodology and cherry-picking, writing, "Furr utilizes a two-pronged approach of inflating any facts that he believes support his conclusions, and he either discredits or ignores anything which contradicts his thesis."

According to British journalist John O'Sullivan writing for National Review, Furr is "a 'historian' who denies that Stalin committed any crimes at all. [...] On reading this, my first reaction was that Grover Furr must be a fictional character or teasing Internet hoax. Revisionist historians nostalgic for 'really existing socialism' have long sought to minimize the number of Stalin's victims and the scale of Soviet crimes. But the extravagance of Furr's claims — every accusation against Stalin false! — made it hard to take them seriously. They amount less to revisionism than to outright denial of historical reality." Conservative writer David Horowitz included Furr in his book The Professors: The 101 Most Dangerous Academics in America, stating that Furr uses his university courses to "vent his political passions on his helpless students", citing Furr's denunciation of "Western imperialists" that was published in the Montclair State University student newspaper.

== Bibliography ==
=== Books ===
- Furr, Grover (2011). Khrushchev Lied. The Evidence that Every Revelation of Stalin's (and Beria's) Crimes in Nikita Khrushchev's Infamous Secret Speech to the 20th Party Congress of the Communist Party of the Soviet Union on February 25, 1956, Is Provably False. Kettering, Ohio: Erythros Press and Media. ISBN 9780615441054.
- Furr, Grover (2013). The Murder of Sergei Kirov: History, Scholarship and the Anti-Stalin Paradigm. Kettering, Ohio: Erythros Press and Media. ISBN 9780615802015.
- Furr, Grover (2014). Blood Lies: The Evidence that Every Accusation against Joseph Stalin and the Soviet Union in Timothy Snyder's Bloodlands Is False. New York City, New York: Red Star Publishers. ISBN 9780692200995.
- Furr, Grover (2015). Trotsky's Amalgams. Trotsky's Lies, The Moscow Trials as Evidence, The Dewey Commission. Trotsky's Conspiracies of the 1930s, Volume One. Kettering, Ohio: Erythros Press and Media. ISBN 9780692582244.
- Furr, Grover (2016). Yezhov vs. Stalin: The Truth About Mass Repressions and the So-Called Great Terror in the USSR. Kettering, Ohio: Erythros Press and Media. ISBN 9780692810507.
- Furr, Grover (2017). Leon Trotsky's Collaboration with Germany and Japan. Trotsky's Conspiracies of the 1930s, Volume Two. Kettering, Ohio: Erythros Press and Media. ISBN 9780692945735.
- Furr, Grover (2018). The Fraud of the Dewey Commission. New York City, New York: Red Star Publishers. ISBN 9781722702243.
- Furr, Grover (2018). The Moscow Trials as Evidence. New York City, New York: Red Star Publishers. ISBN 9781722842123.
- Furr, Grover (2018). The Mystery of the Katyn Massacre: The Evidence, The Solution. Kettering, Ohio: Erythros Press and Media. ISBN 9780692134252.
- Furr, Grover (2019). Stalin: Waiting for ... the Truth! Exposing the Falsehoods in Stephen Kotkin's Stalin: Waiting for Hitler, 1929–1941. New York City, New York: Red Star Publishers. ISBN 9780578445533.
- Furr, Grover (2019). Trotsky's Lies. Kettering, Ohio: Erythros Press and Media. ISBN 9780578521046.
- Furr, Grover (2020). New Evidence of Trotsky's Conspiracy. Kettering, Ohio: Erythros Press and Media. ISBN 9780578649764.
- Furr, Grover (2021). Trotsky and the Military Conspiracy: Soviet and Non-Soviet Evidence; with the Complete Transcript of the "Tukhachevsky Affair" Trial. Kettering, Ohio: Erythros Press and Media. ISBN 978-0578816036.
- Furr, Grover (2022). The Fraud of the "Testament of Lenin". Kettering, Ohio: Erythros Press and Media. ISBN 978-0578284996.
- Furr, Grover; Bobrov, Vladimir (2023). Stalin Exonerated: Fact-Checking the Death of Solomon Mikhoels. Kettering, Ohio: Erythros Press and Media. ISBN 979-8218243876.
- Furr, Grover; Bobrov, Vladimir (2024). Trotsky's Comintern Conspiracy - the Case of Osip Pyatnitsky. Kettering, Ohio: Erythros Press and Media. ISBN 979-8218509293.
