= Anne Applebaum bibliography =

List of works by or about American journalist Anne Applebaum.

== Books ==
- Applebaum, Anne (1994). Between East and West : across the borderlands of Europe. Pantheon Books.
- Gulag: A History, Doubleday, 2003, 677 pages, ISBN 0-7679-0056-1; paperback, Bantam Dell, 2004, 736 pages, ISBN 1-4000-3409-4
- Gulag Voices : An Anthology, Yale University Press, 2011, 224 pages, ISBN 9780300177831; hardback
- Iron Curtain: The Crushing of Eastern Europe, 1944–1956, Allen Lane, 2012, 614 pages, ISBN 978-0-713-99868-9 / Doubleday ISBN 978-0-385-51569-6
- From a Polish Country House Kitchen, Chronicle Books, 2012, 288 pages, ISBN 1-452-11055-7; hardback
- Red Famine: Stalin's War on Ukraine, Penguin Randomhouse, (2017)
- Twilight of Democracy: The Seductive Lure of Authoritarianism, Doubleday, (2020), 224 pages, ISBN 978-0385545808; hardback
- Wybór (Choice), Agora, (2021), 320 pages, ISBN 978-8326838255; hardback
- Autocracy, Inc.: The Dictators Who Want to Run the World, Doubleday, (2024), 224 pages, ISBN 978-0385549936; hardback

== Essays and reporting ==
- Applebaum, Anne (November 6, 2017). "100 years later, Bolshevism is back. And we should be worried". The Washington Post.
- Applebaum, Anne & Jeffrey Goldberg (June 2023). "The counteroffensive". The Atlantic. 331 (5): 16–31.

== Critical studies and reviews of Applebaum's work ==
- Contemporary Review, December 2003, review of Gulag: A History of the Soviet Camps, p. 379.
- History Today, October 2003, Helen Rappaport, review of Gulag, p. 58.
- Kirkus Reviews, August 15, 1994, review of Between East and West, p. 1095.
- The New York Times Book Review, December 18, 1994, Robert D. Kaplan, review of Between East and West, pp. 11–12.
- The Wall Street Journal, October 24, 1994, Brian Hill, review of Between East and West, p. A11.
- Washington Post Book World, November 20, 1994, Marie Arana-Ward, review of Between East and West, p. 4.
