= Autocracy, Inc. =

2024 book by Anne Applebaum

Autocracy, Inc.: The Dictators Who Want to Run the World
- First edition
- Author: Anne Applebaum
- Language: English
- Subject: Political science
- Publisher: Doubleday
- Publication date: 2024
- Publication place: United States
- Media type: Print
- Pages: 224 pp.
- ISBN: 978-0-385-54993-6
- Website: Official website

Autocracy, Inc.: The Dictators Who Want to Run the World is a 2024 non-fiction book written by Pulitzer Prize winner Anne Applebaum and published by Doubleday. The book examines how autocratic governments which do not share a common ideology collaborate to increase their power and control against the democratic and liberal countries. It is an expanded version of her article in The Atlantic: "The Bad Guys Are Winning".

The book has been recognized as one of the "Books of the Year" by The Economist.

== Summary ==
The book describes the relationships between autocratic governments in the 21st century, which are no longer based on shared ideology but "rather by a ruthless, single-minded determination to preserve their personal wealth and power". This networking of autocracies, that include Russia, China, Islamic Republic of Iran, Venezuela and others, use the global economic system and personal connections to support each other in maintaining their personal wealth and keeping their peoples oppressed. The author explores how these autocracies cooperate in several key areas: propaganda and media control, trade in weapons and technologies, and money laundering.

Autocratic governments often support one another while democratic Western countries restrict their media channels. After the Russian invasion of Ukraine, Western nations removed the Russian TV channel Russia Today from their satellites because they claimed it broadcast Russian propaganda and "false narratives". In response, a Chinese satellite began to stream the channel and continue to spread pro-Russian propaganda around the world, especially in the developing world.

These governments also disseminate fake news to stoke fear of Western countries and portray their leaders as defenders of order and tradition. For example, Russian media reports to other autocratic countries against the LGBTQ movement with fake news like "European governments take children from straight families and give them to gay couples" and present Vladimir Putin as guardian of the traditional family. They also use social media to spread propaganda, employing intentional typos in website addresses, known as typosquatting (Reuters.cfd instead of Reuters.com, Spiegel.pr not Spiegel.de), to lend false credibility to their messages and manipulate public opinion.

The cooperation among these governments extends beyond media control to include trade in weapons and technology, enabling them to undermine sanctions imposed by Western countries: China provides weapons to Venezuela, and Iran supplies arms to Russia. The networking of autocracies make often results in unexpected collaborations between governments that do not share ideology, religion, or borders. One such example is the Iran–Venezuela relations: Iran provided technical support, food and petrol to Venezuela, in return, Venezuela laundered money to Hezbollah, a pro-Iranian militia in Lebanon, and provided passports to its officials.

Both knowingly or unknowingly, various organizations within democratic countries also contribute to enrich autocratic governments. Russian and Chinese operatives hire lawyers, accountants, real estate agents and lobbyists in democratic cities like New York and London to help launder their wealth and whitewash their crimes. The autocrats skillfully manipulate the global economic system to serve their interests, while the democratic world, motivated by greed and convenience, often turns a blind eye.

Applebaum claims that, under the nose of the democratic world, autocratic governments thrive through the creation of an extensive system of mutual assistance and connections between them. She writes, "Everyone assumed that in a more open, interconnected world, democracy and liberal ideas would spread to the autocratic states," but, she argues, the autocratic states "spread to the democratic world instead".

To address this concerning phenomenon, Applebaum offers several recommendations: She suggests that opposition groups in autocratic countries should work together, noting that "if the Russian diaspora, the Hong Kong diaspora, the Venezuelan diaspora, and the Iranian diaspora can amplify one another's messages and ideas, than together they can have a larger impact than individual group could have by itself". In addition, she recommends that democratic countries adopt the style of association of autocratic governments to overpower them: unite to increase self-production of critical industries, increasing financial market transparency to combat corruption and shell companies and regulating social media to curb the spread of propaganda, fake news, and misinformation.

Above all, she calls on the Western world to recognize the shifting global order and take appropriate action. She believes that "the citizens of the United States, and the citizens of the democracies of Europe, Asia, Africa, and Latin America, should begin thinking of themselves as linked to one another and to the people who share their values inside autocracies too". She stresses that democratic societies need each other now more than ever, "because their democracies are not safe. Nobody's democracy is safe."

== Reception ==
The Economist named the book one of the "Books of the Year" of 2024.

The Washington Post called it "a valuable book for many reasons". The Times described the writing as "an urgent, almost steamrolling prose" and the reading of the book as "breathless". Writing in The Canadian Policy Magazine, former diplomat Colin Robertson described it as a "briskly brilliant... a depressing chronicle of greed, power and Western naiveté". BBC News world affairs editor John Simpson praised the book as "a masterclass in the marriage of dodgy government to international criminality. Scholar of post-Soviet politics Stephen G. F. Hall of the University of Bath praised the book for its "incisive analysis," but noted that "some readers may find its breadth comes at the expense of depth." Fraser Cameron of the European Policy Centre described the book as an "important contribution to our understanding of how autocratic regimes operate and cooperate" and a "welcome wake-up call to western leaders who have largely turned a blind eye to the nefarious activities of these regimes and their proxies." Writing in The Moscow Times, journalist Pippa Crawford wrote that the book was "excellent at explaining how — and why — dictators lie to people," adding that it "unpacks the fallacy that autocracies need to be ideologically aligned to help each other. And if someone powerful picks up this book at the airport, so much the better."

Political scientist David Moscrop applauded the book for its "valuable account of contemporary disinformation," particularly praising the "insight into the particularities of these operations and their interconnectedness," while also saying that it "doesn’t spend nearly enough time tracing the historical or institutional roots of contemporary autocracy, nor the role the U.S. and other Western democracies have played in shaping, for the worse, global affairs since the end of the Second World War." Frank Langfitt of NPR wrote that the book was "strong on how Western misjudgment and greed enabled and empowered autocrats over the decades" but that it could have "done more to detail the boomerang effect of globalization." Poppy Coburn of The Daily Telegraph gave the book three stars out of five, saying that "untangling Western economies from the dictatorial states of the world will be a difficult task, but a worthy one. Autocracy, Inc fails to convince, however, when it holds up a Liberal World Order as a worthy counterweight." Historian Ferenc Laczó of Maastricht University described the book as "sobering," but warned that "a sense of urgency is crafted here at the expense of more substantial historical comparisons and insights," while also criticising the book for suggesting that autocracies can be defeated merely through an affirmation of liberal ideals instead of improvements to the well-being of citizens of the West.

Samuel McIlhagga of Jacobin gave the book a negative review, criticising it as "narrowly obsessed with the very real atrocities of America’s enemies, at the cost of a comprehensive analysis of the global scene," saying that it failed to examined pro-Western authoritarian states and "never stops to ask how the kleptocratic global system came into existence."

== See also ==
- Democracy Incorporated: Managed Democracy and the Specter of Inverted Totalitarianism
- Twilight of Democracy
