= Julien Benda =

French essayist

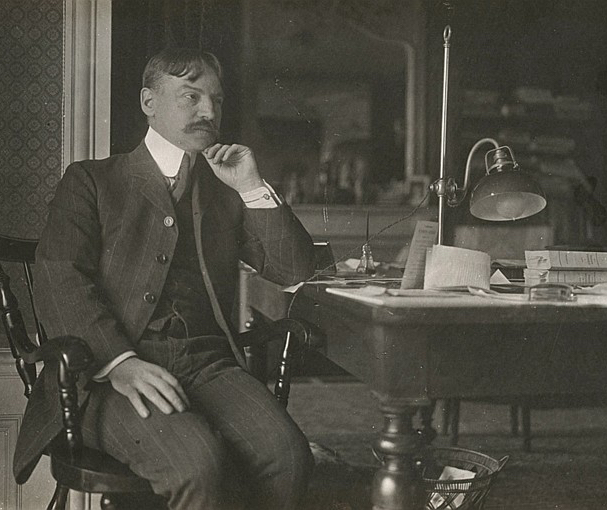
- Born: 26 December 1867; Paris
- Died: 7 June 1956; Fontenay-aux-Roses
- Occupations: Philosopher, writer, critic
- Works: La Trahison des Clercs
- Awards: Commander of the Legion of Honour (1938)

Julien Benda (French: [ʒyljɛ̃ bɛ̃da]; 26 December 1867 – 7 June 1956) was a French philosopher and novelist, known as an essayist and cultural critic. He is best known for his short book La Trahison des clercs, from 1927 (The Treason of the Intellectuals or The Betrayal by the Intellectuals).

== Life ==
Born into a Jewish family in Paris, Benda had a secular upbringing. He was educated at the Lycée Louis-le-Grand. After a period at the École Centrale Paris, he turned to history, and graduated at the Sorbonne in 1894.

His father's death in 1889 left Benda independently wealthy. He wrote for La Revue Blanche from 1891 to 1903. His articles on the Dreyfus affair were collected and published as Dialogues. He disagreed strongly with Henri Bergson, the leading light of French philosophy of his day, and launched an attack on him in 1911, when Bergson's reputation was at its height.

In July 1937 he attended the Second International Writers' Congress, the purpose of which was to discuss the attitude of intellectuals to the war in Spain, held in Valencia, Barcelona and Madrid and attended by many writers including André Malraux, Ernest Hemingway, Stephen Spender and Pablo Neruda.

Benda survived the German occupation of France and the Vichy regime 1940–1944, in Carcassonne. The journal of Jean Guéhenno described his life there, and his character: "Unbearable, yet likeable." He died in Fontenay-aux-Roses, on 7 June 1956.

== Works ==
Benda is considered to be primarily an essayist. He was nominated for the Nobel Prize in Literature four times. His single nomination for the Goncourt Prize was in 1912 for L'Ordination. He lost out to André Savignon's novel Les filles de la pluie. Voting was tied, and the casting vote went to Léon Hennique, in a tumultuous election that caused Hennique to give up the presidency of the Académie Goncourt.

=== La Trahison des Clercs ===
Benda is now best remembered for his short 1927 book La Trahison des Clercs, a work of considerable influence. It was translated into English in 1928 by Richard Aldington; the U.S. edition was titled The Treason of the Intellectuals, while the British edition was titled The Great Betrayal. Aldington's translation was republished in 2006 as The Treason of the Intellectuals, with a new introduction by Roger Kimball. This polemical essay argued that European intellectuals in the 19th and 20th centuries had often lost the ability to reason dispassionately about political and military matters, instead becoming apologists for crass nationalism, warmongering, and racism. Benda reserved his harshest criticisms for his fellow Frenchmen Charles Maurras and Maurice Barrès. Benda defended the measured and dispassionate outlook of classical civilization and the internationalism of traditional Christianity.

Closing this work, Benda darkly predicts that the augmentation of the "realistic" impulse to domination of the material world, justified by intellectuals into an "integral realism," risked producing an all-encompassing species-wide civilization that would completely cease "to situate the good outside the real world." Human aspirations, specifically after power, would become the sole end of society. In closing, he concludes bitterly, "And History will smile to think that this is the species for which Socrates and Jesus Christ died."

Benda's word "clercs" was borrowed by Anne Appelbaum in her 2020 book Twilight of Democracy: The Seductive Lure of Authoritarianism.

=== Other works ===
Other works by Benda include Belphégor (1918), Uriel's Report (1926), and Exercises of a Man Buried Alive (1947), an attack on the contemporary French celebrities of his time. Most of the titles in the bibliography below were published during the last three decades of Benda's long life; he is emphatically a 20th-century author.

In his 1933 publication Discours à la nation européenne, Benda responded to Johann Gottlieb Fichte's Addresses to the German Nation.

== Bibliography ==
- L'ordination – 1911
  - English translation, The yoke of pity, by Gilbert Cannan – 1913
- Les sentiments de Critias – 1917
- Belphégor : essai sur l'esthétique de la présente société française – 1918
- Les amorandes – 1922
- La croix de roses; précédé d'un dialogue d'Eleuthère avec l'auteur – 1923
- Lettres à Mélisande – 1926
- La trahison des clercs – 1927
  - English translation,The Betrayal of the Intellectuals, by Richard Aldington:
    - 1955 (1928). Beacon Press. Introduction by Herbert Read.
  - The Treason of the Intellectuals
    - 2006. Transaction Publishers. Introduction by Roger Kimball.
- Cléanthis ou du Beau et de l'actuel – 1928
- Properce, ou, Les amants de Tibur – 1928
- La Fin de l’Éternel – 1929
- Appositions – 1930
- Esquisse d'une histoire des Français dans leur volonté d'être une nation – 1932
- Discours à la nation européenne – 1933
- La jeunesse d'un clerc – 1936
- Précision (1930–1937) – 1937
- Un régulier dans le siècle – 1937
- Un Régulier dans le siècle (Paris, Gallimard) 1938
- La grande épreuve des démocraties : essai sur les principes démocratiques : leur nature, leur histoire, leur valeur philosophique. – 1942
- Exercice d'un enterré vif, juin 1940-août 1944 – 1945
- La France Byzantine, ou, Le triomphe de la littérature pure : Mallarmé, Gide, Proust, Valéry, Alain Giraudoux, Suarès, les Surréalistes : essai d'une psychologie originelle du littérateur – 1945
- Du poétique. Selon l'humanité, non-selon les poètes – 1946
- Non possumus. À propos d'une certaine poésie moderne – 1946
- Le rapport d'Uriel – 1946
- Tradition de l'existentialisme, ou, Les philosophies de la vie – 1947
- Du style d'idées : réflexions sur la pensée, sa nature, ses réalisations, sa valeur morale – 1948
- Trois idoles romantiques : le dynamisme, l'existentialisme, la dialectique matérialiste – 1948
- Les cahiers d'un clerc, 1936–1949 – 1949
- La crise du rationalisme – 1949

== See also ==
- Alain Finkielkraut
- Notes on Nationalism, a 1945 essay by George Orwell dealing with similar themes as Benda's Trahison des Clercs.
