= Subcamp (disambiguation) =

A subcamp under Nazi Germany was a subordinate camp of a concentration camp.

Subcamp may also refer to:

- Subcamp, a lagpunkt ("camp unit") of a GULAG labor camp or of a GUPVI POW camp, Soviet Union
- Subcamp, a subordinate camp of a National Scout jamboree, United States

== See also ==
and
