= Iran–Venezuela relations =

- Iran: Venezuela

Iran–Venezuela relations refers to the diplomatic relationship between the two countries. Relations were regarded as friendly during the 2000s, 2010s and early to mid 2020s, according to former Iranian President Hassan Rouhani. Under Hugo Chávez and Nicolás Maduro, the two countries were contemporary strategic allies of the Russian Federation and the People's Republic of China while opposing U.S. hegemony in their respective regions.

== Country comparison ==
Common name	Iran	Venezuela
Official Name	Islamic Republic of Iran	Bolivarian Republic of Venezuela
Flag	Iran	Venezuela
Coat of Arms		
Area	1,648,195 km (648,372 sq mi)	916,442 km (353,841 sq mi)
Population	83,183,741	28,887.118
Population density	45/km (116.6/sq mi)	33.74/km (87.4/sq mi)
Capital	Tehran	Caracas
Largest city	Tehran – 9,033,000 (16,000,378 metro)	Caracas – 5,576,000 (4,715.1 metro)
Government	Unitary Khomeinist presidential Islamic republic	Federal dominant-party presidential constitutional republic
Leader	Mojtaba Khamenei	Delcy Rodríguez
Established	3200 BC (First Persian Empire); 13 December 1925 (Modern Iranian state); 1 April 1979 (Islamic Republic)	15 December 1999
Official languages	Persian	Spanish

== History ==
Formal diplomatic relations between the countries began in the mid-20th century. Relations strengthened after Chávez came to power in 1999. The alliance began as both governments had shared goals, such as acting against US foreign policy. During Chavez and Khatami's presidencies, there were multiple visits to Caracas and Tehran.

=== 2001−2005: Chávez and Khatami administrations ===
As President of Venezuela from 1999, before his death, former Venezuelan president Hugo Chávez developed strong ties with the government of Iran, in particular in the area of energy production, economic cooperation, and industrial development. Both countries cooperate in construction, oil and gas, and in infrastructure projects. He has visited Iran on several occasions, the first time in 2001, when he declared that he came to Iran to "prepare the road for peace, justice, stability and progress for the 21st century". As the fifth President of Iran with a term lasting from 3 August 1997 to 3 August 2005, Mohamed Khatami visited Venezuela on three occasions. During his March 2005 visit, Chávez awarded him the Orden del Libertador and called him a "tireless fighter for all the right causes in the world."

In March 2005, the BBC reported that Chavez's relationship with Iran and his support of their nuclear program has created concern for the US administration.

Chavez publicly stated his support to Iran's resistance to US influence, committing Venezuela to stand by Iran "under any conditions". In return, Iranian leaders replied with emphasizing that both countries share a joint struggle against US imperialism, and that they seek a world built on justice.

=== 2005−2006: Start of Ahmadinejad administration ===
Mahmoud Ahmadinejad was elected President of Iran on August 3, 2005. Since then, Ahmadinejad and Chávez visited each other multiple times, signing more than 270 bilateral deals to support multiple campaigns for social and infrastructural national development. Both presidents of Venezuela and Iran, President Hugo Chávez and President Ahmadinejad, respectively, have described themselves on the world stage as opposed to "US imperialism". Citing this commonality of opinion, they regard each other as allies, and they have embarked on a number of initiatives together. Chávez frequently expressed support for Ahmadinejad's Iran and immediately recognized the legitimacy of his second term as president and supported Tehran's nuclear policy.

In early May 2006, it was reported that Venezuela was interested in selling its 21 F-16 Fighting Falcons to Iran, an announcement which proved controversial. Also in May 2006, Chávez expressed his favorable view of the production of nuclear energy in Iran announced by Mahmoud Ahmadinejad and denied that they had plans to develop atomic weapons.

In July 2006, Chávez paid a two-day visit to Iran when the government faced international criticism for continuing its nuclear program and backing Hezbollah guerrillas. In July 2006, Chávez pledged that Venezuela would "stay by Iran at any time and under any condition." He said "We are with you and with Iran forever. As long as we remain united we will be able to defeat imperialism, but if we are divided they will push us aside". In July 2006, Reuters reported that Chávez told a crowd at the University of Tehran, "If the U.S. succeeds in consolidating its dominance, then the humankind has no future. Therefore, we have to save the humankind and put an end to the U.S.". The report adds that Chávez lashed out at Israel and labeled the 2006 Lebanon offensive as "fascist and terrorist."

=== 2007−2009: Axis of unity, "G-2 summit," and bank ===
On January 6, 2007, the two announced that they would use some money from a previously announced $2bn joint fund to invest in other countries that were "attempting to liberate themselves from the imperialist yoke", in Chavez's words. On March 16, 2007, Chavez said in a television interview that he disagreed with President Ahmadinejad's alleged call to "wipe Israel off the map" (which is a mistranslation) saying "I don't support causing harm to any nation.". (See also Israel-Venezuela relations.)

The two presidents declared an axis of unity against "US imperialism" in July 2007, to describe a new alliance of "revolutionary states". On October 5, 2008, Venezuela's Foreign Minister Nicolas Maduro visited Ahmadinejad in Tehran. During the 2009 G-20 London summit, Chavez and Ahmadinejad held their own meeting which they called the "G-2" summit, at which the formation of a joint Iranian-Venezuelan development bank was announced, initially with US$200 million capital.

=== 2010-2012: Bilateral visits ===
During a visit to Iran in 2010 by Hugo Chávez, he condemned "military attack threats against Iran by some countries. We know that they can never thwart the Islamic Revolution." He also said that as a result of such "great threats", it was necessary to "consolidate strategic alliances in political, economic, technological, energy and social areas." Mahmoud Ahmadinejad, also supported the comments for a "strategic alliance;" he also added that "We are united and determined to end the current unjust which dominates the world and replace it with a new world order based on justice. Iran and Venezuela are united to establish a new world order based on humanity and justice. We believe that the only result of bullying movements of imperialism all around the world, and especially in Latin America, will be the fast decline of imperial power." The two countries also signed deals in areas such as oil, natural gas, textiles, trade and public housing.

In May 2011, U.S. President Barack Obama imposed sanctions on Venezuela's state oil company PDVSA for defying US law and sending “Iran two tankers of an oil product.” In September 2011, Ahmadinejad postponed a visit to Caracas while Chavez recovered from a fourth round of cancer treatment, according to officials. Several days earlier, the two countries had “signed cooperation deals on manufacturing, energy, construction and agriculture during talks in Caracas.” Around this time, Maduro stated that ““While imperialism and its criminal elites have declared war on the Muslim people since more than 10 years ago, we in the Bolivarian Revolution, led by President Chavez, declare our love for the culture of Muslim people, all their history, and declare our eternal brotherhood.”

The object of Chávez's Bolivarianism was to create an ideological basin spreading from the Caribbean Sea to the Persian Gulf. It is a role that Iran is trying to carve out for itself amidst the undercurrents engulfing his part of the world and the need to show that Iran is not isolated internationally.

=== 2013: Death of Chavez ===
After Chávez's death was announced on March 5, 2013, vice president Nicolás Maduro became interim president. The day after Chavez's death, Ahmadinejad's personal tribute to Chavez online was met with criticism from some Iranian clerics, when he wrote that Chavez would “return on resurrection day” along with religious figures such as Jesus. A week later, CNN reported that Ahmadinejad attended the funeral of his “good friend” Chavez. Ahmadinejad embraced Chavez's grieving mother at the funeral in “a show of compassion and support,” which according to CNN in Iran “was immediately bashed by newspapers and by conservative politicians who cited a religious prohibition against touching a woman who is not your wife or a relative.” After the funeral, Ahmadinejad affirmed that Iran-Venezuelan relations would stay strong regardless of who was elected as the next Venezuelan president. At the time, as of March 10, 2013, "annual bilateral trade between the two countries is estimated to be in the hundreds of million of US dollars."

=== 2013−2016: Maduro and Rouhani administrations ===
A special election was held on 14 April 2013 to elect a new president, and Nicolas Maduro won with 50.62% of the votes, and was inaugurated on 19 April. On April 19, 2013, Ahmadinejad arrived in Caracas to take part in Maduro's inauguration ceremony, stating “Venezuela is on the eve of a glorious way and has an important historic mission. The Venezuelan nation should at first progress rapidly to make a prosperous, advanced, rich, and powerful country. Secondly, it should keep the flag of justice and freedom raised in Latin America... [Iran's] relation with Venezuela...symbolizes Iran's relation with Latin America.” Hassan Rouhani was elected as President of Iran on 15 June 2013.

As of August 2014, Venezuela and Iran had “signed 265 agreements deriving from 58 projects in the industrial, environmental, agricultural, commercial, educational, sports, housing, cultural, energy and scientific and technology areas.” Early that month, Venezuelan Foreign Minister Elias Jaua visited Tehran to meet Rouhani in a purported effort to strengthen diplomatic relations, with Iran reaffirming its support for the Bolivarian government, and expressed mutual support of the Palestinian state, also agreeing to not recognize Israel as a legitimate state. Maduro visited Iran the next month.

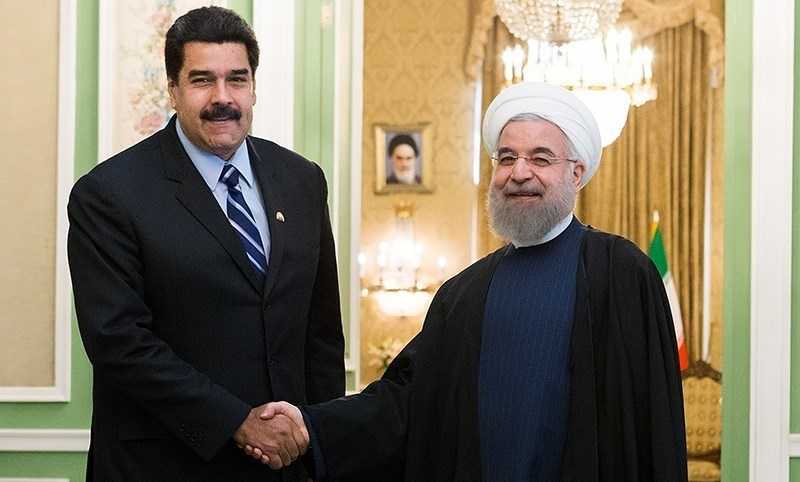
Venezuelan President Nicolas Maduro meeting with Iranian President Hassan Rouhani in Saadabad Palace on November 23, 2015.

In January 2015, Maduro visited Iran, as a stop on his tour of other OPEC countries. Both Maduro and Rouhani agreed that falling oil prices resulted from increased fracking in the United States, as well as their “common enemies” using oil prices as a “political ploy.” Rouhani affirmed that Iran and Venezuela would join forces to “thwart world powers’ strategies ... and to stabilize prices at a reasonable level in 2015.” At the time, Venezuelan oil accounted for “over 95 percent of the country's export earnings,” with the price of a barrel dropping by half since 2014.

In June 2015, Iran and Venezuela signed a series of agreements to “fund joint investments and improve the supply of goods,” with Maduro announcing “These are six agreements of major importance for the economy of our countries.” The countries agreed to jointly fund a research program in nanotechnology, and Maduro also stated that he secured goods “necessary for the Venezuelan people” such as drugs and surgical equipment. Iran's Minister of Industry, Mines and Trade reportedly stated the agreement was preliminary subject to review by Iran's finance ministry.

On November 23, 2015, Maduro and Rouhani met in Tehran in Maduro's second visit to the country that year, and the fifth from Venezuelan senior officials. During the meetings, the presidents announced they were re-affirming their country's mutual alliance. In January 2016, Maduro and Rouhani reportedly held telephone talks where "Maduro called on Rouhani to promote the adoption of measures to restore oil prices on the world market," with Maduro calling for a meeting of OPEC members to address the issue, and congratulating Rouhani on recent cancelations of sanctions.

=== 2018−2019: Venezuelan presidential crisis ===
In May 2018, Maduro was re-elected for a second term, but the election was denounced as fraudulent by most neighboring countries, the European Union, Canada and the United States. Iran, however, recognized the election and President Rouhani congratulated Maduro.

In January 2019, the majority opposition National Assembly of Venezuela declared that Maduro's reelection was invalid and declared its president, Juan Guaidó, to be acting president of Venezuela. The United States, Canada, Brazil and several Latin American countries recognized Guaidó as interim president. Iran continued to support Maduro.

=== 2020: Gasoline exports to Venezuela ===
Since 2020, Iran has sent fuel, diluents, and refinery support to Venezuela. In return according to reports it received oil and gold, which caused claims they were evading sanctions systematically.

In May 2020, Iran sent five oil tankers to Venezuela under sanctions of the U.S., because Venezuela's oil refining industry collapsed because of under investment and mismanagement. The names of the ships are Forest, Fortune, Petunia, Faxon and Clavel. These ships were loaded with gasoline at a refinery near Bandar Abbas. They carried about 60 million gallons of Iranian gasoline. Because of U.S. sanctions against both countries, Presidents of both countries warned about U.S. attempts to block this fuel delivery. After these threats to disrupt Iranian fuel tankers heading for Venezuela, Foreign Minister Mohammad Javad Zarif sent a letter to António Guterres to warn about the US move to send troops to the Caribbean to obstruct the fuel export. Also Abbas Araghchi summoned the Swiss ambassador, who was acting as an intermediary for US interests in Iran, and urged him to convey Iran's serious warning about any possible threats by the US against Iranian tankers. According to the book Autocracy, Inc. by Anne Applebaum, in exchange for gasoline, Venezuela helped Iran through laundered money to Hezbollah, a pro-Iranian militia in Lebanon, and provided passports to its officials.

In 2022, President Nicolás Maduro and President Ebrahim Raisi maintained close relations, continuing to cultivate the strategic relationship. They stressed resisting imperialism, protecting national independence, and working together on development projects set out in major cooperation agreements.

=== 2022: Iran's Naval base ===
As Israeli intelligence sources declared, Iran makes relations with Venezuela, and Iranian naval forces are planning to build a naval base at ports of Venezuela to operate out of in the Americas.

=== 2023: Increased military presence and oil trade ===
Iran's petroleum exports hit a new high in early 2023 due to increased shipments to Venezuela and China. Iran had supported Venezuela's oil exports, and its navy established a presence in Panama Canal for the first time ever. The two countries also announced direct flights between Tehran and Caracas starting in August 2023. From 2023 onwards, Iran has been looking to widen its collaboration with Latin America. Though visits, agreements and dispatching specialists, Iran has tried to overcome sanctions laid on it.

=== 2024 ===
Between 2024 and 2025, it was reported the swap deal started breaking down because Venezuela fell behind on its deliveries. This showed the deal was both fragile and not very transparent. In 2026, Donald Trump said it was his intention to seize over 50 million barrels of oil from Venezuela following the removal and subsequent arrest of former Venezuelan President Nicolás Maduro.

The Venezuela-Iran "ghost flights" were irregular cargo/passenger flights operated by sanctioned airlines (Mahan Air, Conviasa/Emtrasur) that have drawn scrutiny for suspected transfers of sanctioned cargo and personnel. The most notable case was the Emtrasur 747 grounded in Argentina in June 2022 and ultimately seized and transferred to the United States in February 2024.

=== 2025: Pressure on Iran to take assets out of Venezuela ===
Former Iranian politician Heshmatollah Falahatpishe warned that Iran needed to clarify the status of $2 billion in claims against Venezuela, saying that political instability in Venezuela could make it difficult for Iran to collect the money.

=== 2026: Response to the US intervention in Venezuela ===
In January 2026, the relations between Iran and Venezuela were heavy affected by the American strikes on Venezuela and capture of President Nicolás Maduro and his wife. Removing Maduro has weakened the Axis of Unity's partnership in oil, trade, and defense projects. Moreover, with heavier US influence following the removal of Maduro, the anti-American identity of the alliance, the distinctive feature of the Axis of Unity, has significantly died down. In reaction to the capture of Nicolás Maduro, the Iranian government expressed support for Maduro and condemned the US strikes. In the aftermath of the strikes, the future of financial cooperation between the nations is unclear.

Although the alliance has become weaker, Pro-Iranian commentators believe that it will likely continue its cooperation more carefully, in symbolic and resilient ways. Iran reaffirmed its support for Venezuela and spoke out against the US on the international stage. However, the US government has demanded that the Venezuelan interim authorities remove the influence of hostile countries such as China, Iran, and Russia from its territory.

The Venezuelan opposition figure María Corina Machado and the Iranian opposition figure Reza Pahlavi, son of the last shah of Iran and exiled in the United States, met on January 22, 2026 to discuss freedom for Venezuela and Iran in the context of the 2025–2026 Iranian protests. Machado denounced the ties between the Chavista regime in Venezuela with the Ayatollah-led Iran.

On 29 July 2026, Venezuela summoned the Iranian ambassador to deliver a formal note of protest after the foreign minister of Iran, Abbas Araghchi, said that "Iran was not Venezuela" when referring to its own negotiations with the US during the 2026 Iran war.

== Policy ==
Although Venezuela's socialist Bolivarian project and Iran's theocratic Shi'ite system are ideologically different, even contrasting, both countries have built an alliance around shared opposition to what they view as a US imperial agenda. Both of them face US sanctions and international isolation, which has pushed them to collaborate more closely. Their partnership emphasizes national sovereignty and mutual respect. In practice, they align in rejecting US interventions, opposing Israeli statehood, and supporting Palestinian causes.

The relationship has also been characterised as part of a broader effort by both countries to strengthen ties with governments opposed to US influence and to promote a more multipolar international order. It is part of a wider move aiming for a world with several centers of influence, rather than one led by the west. The two countries have also sought to coordinate their foreign policies in response to US sanctions and diplomatic pressure, while advocating greater autonomy from Western influence in international affairs.

== Academic relations ==
The cooperation between the two countries extends beyond the economic domain, to the cultural and scientific ones. At a time when Venezuela and Russia were working on nuclear cooperation, the Iranian Minister of Science, Research and Technology, Mohammad Mehdi Zahedi, headed a delegation to Caracas to hold talks with high-ranking officials in order to follow up on implementation of agreements which had been inked between the two countries in 2006. Additionally, two technical and educational committees for implementing Iran-Venezuela agreements were also set up. The Iranian delegation visited the Venezuelan Foundation for Seismological Research, Central University of Venezuela, Simon Bolivar University, and the Venezuelan Institute for Scientific Research. Beyond the political-military sphere the two countries also pledged to work together academically in the commissioning of a new university programme at the existing, tuition-free Bolivarian University, with a focus on teaching socialist principles and to promote discussion of "21st century socialism." The government of Venezuela said this followed with plans to establish the University of Civilizations under accords recently signed with Iran.

== Trade relations ==
Over the years, Iran's and Venezuela's collaboration tightened in areas such as energy, industry, trade, and defense. They initiated projects of joint oil and petrochemical ventures, technology transfers, and mutual support against sanctions. Iran has consistently supported Venezuela with essential oil shipments and industrial equipment, helping it through acute fuel shortages and US sanctions. In 2022, a 20-year cooperation pact was signed in oil, petrochemicals, and defense. Both are active in OPEC and seek to influence global oil markets collaboratively.

As of the end of 2008, Iran's beneficence to Venezuela had paid dividends in the form of an Iranian ammunition factory, a car assembly plant (the Venirauto factory of Iran Khodro, producing the Samand sedan), a cement factory and direct air service between Tehran, Damascus and Caracas courtesy of Iran Air.

Trade between Venezuela and Iran has grown steadily and the two countries have launched joint ventures in a number of sectors, including energy, agriculture, housing, and infrastructure (2008). The value of industrial development projects carried out by Iranian firms in Venezuela stands at around $4 billion (December 2008). Iran-Venezuela bilateral trade spiked, from less than $189,000 in 2001 to almost $57 million by the end of 2008.

In 2007, Iran Air, in partnership with Conviasa, started a Tehran-Caracas flight via Damascus. The flights along with the partnership between Conviasa and Iran Air ceased in 2010.

On March 10, 2013, the Times of Israel reported that "annual bilateral trade between the two countries is estimated to be in the hundreds of million of US dollars."

In mid-2020, the Iranian state-run corporation Etka, which, according to the Wall Street Journal, is owned by Iran's ministry of defense and has connections to the Revolutionary Guards, opened a supermarket in Caracas called "Megasis" mainly selling products imported from Iran.

On May 13, 2022, according to Iran's official news agency IRNA, a 110 million Euro contract has been signed to repair and restart Venezuela's smallest refinery, the 146,000-barrel-per-day El Palito.

On June 11, 2022, Iran and Venezuela signed a 20-year cooperation agreement in Tehran.

== International reactions ==
A number of the relations between Iran and Venezuela have been controversial in other countries.

=== 2006 – Venezuela's F-16 fleet to Iran ===
In 2006, the Iranian media published series of reports that suggested Venezuela was interested in selling its 21 F-16 Fighting Falcons to Iran. The reports were corroborated when a Hugo Chavez advisor told the Associated Press that: "Venezuela's military is considering selling its fleet of U.S.-made F-16 fighter jets to another country, possibly Iran, in response to a U.S. ban on arms sales to President Hugo Chávez's government". In response, Sean McCormack, the U.S. State Department spokesman, warned Venezuela and suggested: "Without the written consent of the United States, Venezuela can't transfer these defense articles, and in this case F-16s, to a third country".

=== 2012 – U.S. Congress examines Iran in Latin America ===
In early 2012, the U.S. Congress began to voice escalating concern over Iran's interests in Latin America, particularly its relations with Venezuela. On January 18, Representative Jeff Duncan (R - South Carolina) introduced the Countering Iran in the Western Hemisphere Act of 2012. The bill called on the United States to use all elements of national power to counter Iran's growing presence and hostile activity in the Western Hemisphere. Then, on February 2, Representative Ileana Ros-Lehtinen (R-FL) convened a Committee on Foreign Affairs hearing on Iranian activity in the Western Hemisphere. Finally, on March 7, Duncan's legislation concerning the Iranian government's activities in the Western Hemisphere passed out of the House Foreign Affairs Committee with strong bipartisan support.

Following the hearings, a number of independent reports and position papers were released which appeared to legitimize the threat posed by Iranian activity in the Western Hemisphere. This included a major study by the Center for Strategic and International Studies in March 2012. However, it was also suggested that partisan politics contributed to Republicans' interest in the topic.

The Countering Iran in the Western Hemisphere Act of 2012 currently is before the House of Representatives for consideration. If passed into law by Congress, the bill will require the U.S. Secretary of State to submit to Congress a strategy to address Iran's growing presence and activity in the Western Hemisphere within 180 days of enactment.

== See also ==
- Foreign relations of Iran
- Foreign relations of Venezuela
- Axis of Resistance
- Iranian shadow fleet
- International sanctions against Iran
- Iranian energy crisis
- Crisis in Venezuela
- 2025–2026 Iranian protests
- 2026 Iran war
