= John O'Sullivan (columnist) =

British journalist

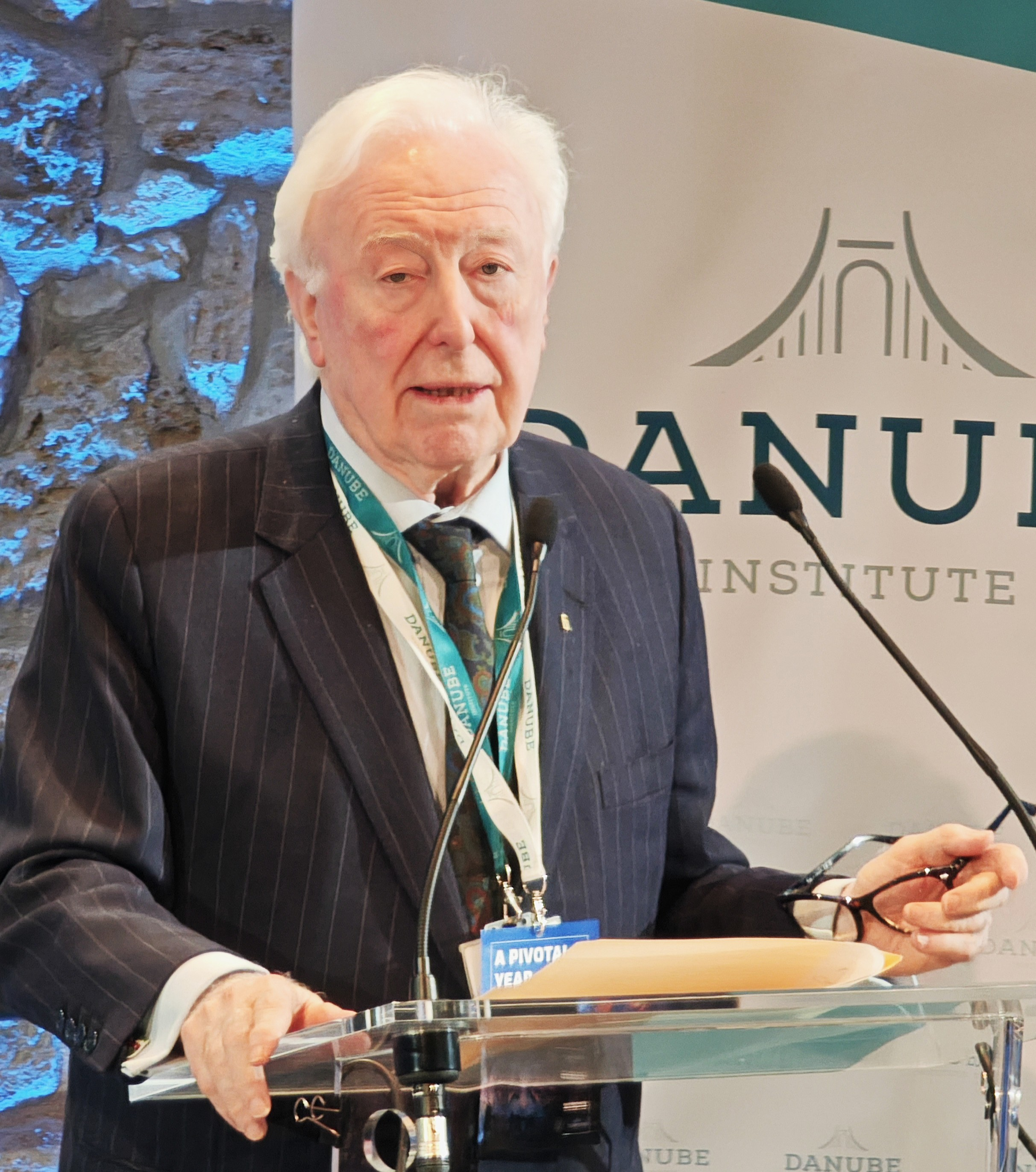
O'Sullivan in 2026

John O'Sullivan, CBE (born 25 April 1942) is a British conservative political commentator and journalist. From 1987 to 1988, he was a senior policy writer and speechwriter in 10 Downing Street for Margaret Thatcher when she was British prime minister and remained close to her up to her death.

O'Sullivan served as vice president and executive editor of Radio Free Europe/Radio Liberty from 2008 to 2012. He was editor of the Australian monthly magazine Quadrant from 2015 to 2017.

Since 2017, he has been president of the Danube Institute, a Fidesz government-financed think tank based in Budapest, Hungary, and a member of the board of advisors for the Global Panel Foundation, an NGO that works behind the scenes in crisis areas around the world.

A former editor of National Review from 1988 to 1997, O'Sullivan has been an editor-at-large there since then.

== Early life ==
Born in Liverpool, O'Sullivan was educated at St Mary's College, Crosby, and received his higher education at the University of London. He stood unsuccessfully as a Conservative candidate for the constituency of Gateshead West in the 1970 British general election.

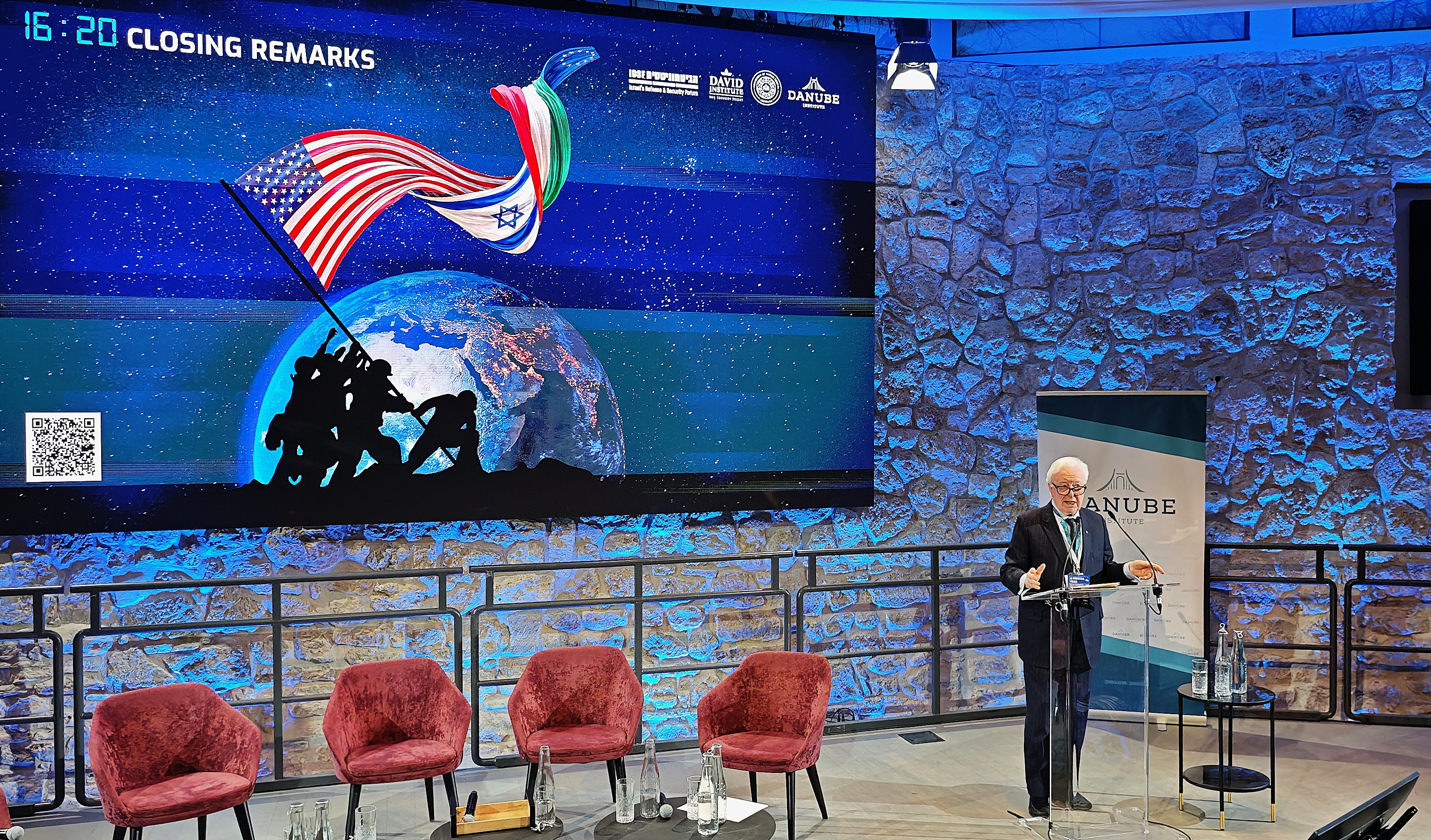
John O'Sullivan – Director of Danube Institute, Budapest

In 2014 he moved to Budapest, to set up the Danube Institute. He is the Director of 21st Century Initiatives and Senior Fellow at the National Review Institute in Washington, D.C..

== Journalism career ==
O'Sullivan is a former editor (1988–1997) and current editor-at-large of the opinion magazine National Review and a former senior fellow at the Hudson Institute. He had previously been the editor-in-chief of United Press International, editor-in-chief of the international affairs magazine, The National Interest, and a special adviser to British prime minister Margaret Thatcher. He was made a Commander of the Order of the British Empire (CBE) in the 1991 New Year's Honours List.

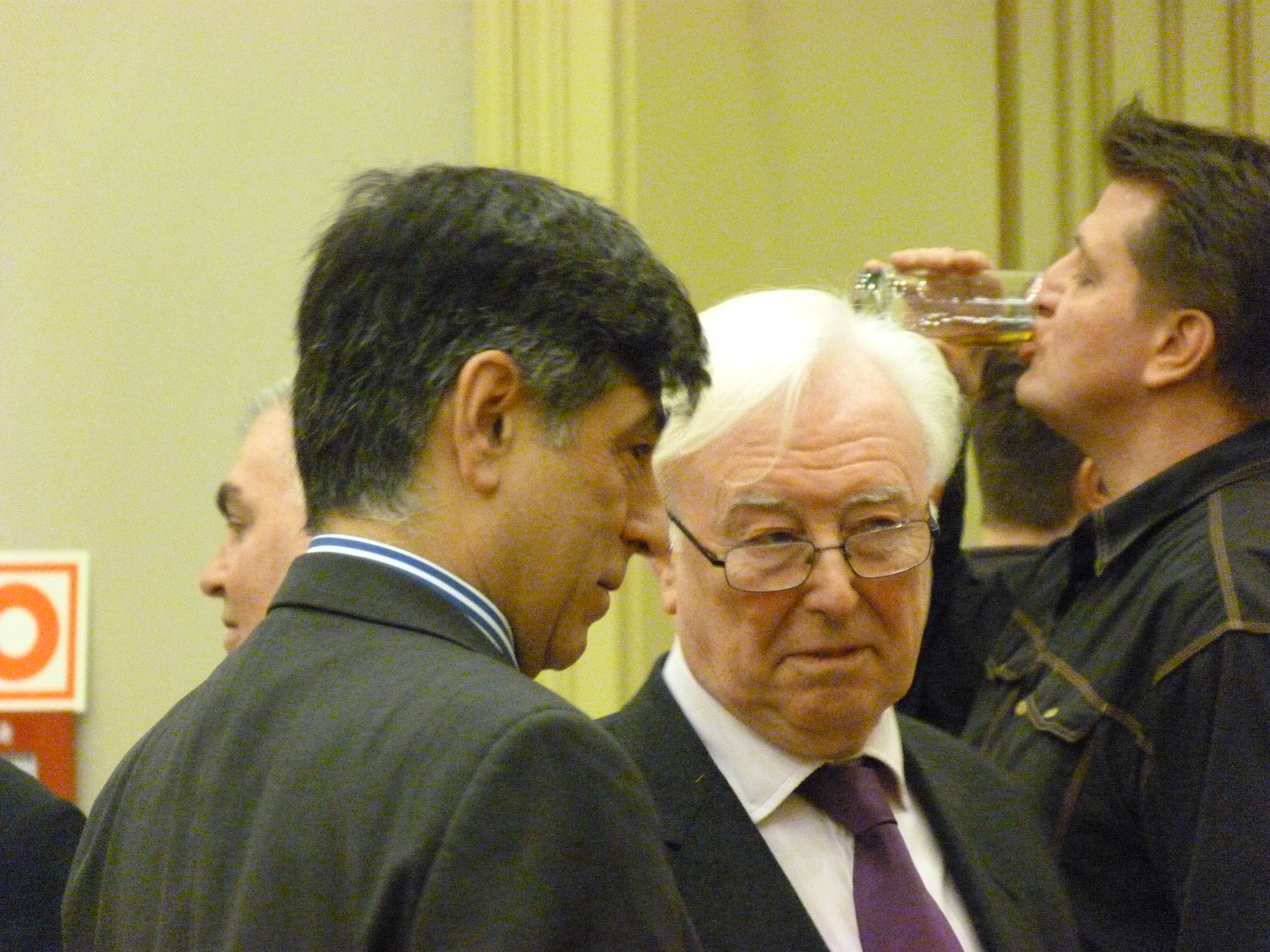
John O'Sullivan, Mark André Goodfriend – 2015

In 1998 O'Sullivan was a leading member of the journalistic team that founded the National Post, a right-leaning national newspaper in Canada.

O'Sullivan is the founder and co-chairman of the New Atlantic Initiative, an international organisation dedicated to reinvigorating and expanding the Atlantic community of democracies. The organisation was created at the Congress of Prague in May 1996 by Václav Havel and Margaret Thatcher.

In 2013, O'Sullivan became first the director and then president of the Danube Institute, a Budapest-based think tank, for which he is paid an annual salary of 150,000 Euros, indirectly financed by the Hungarian government. The Danube Institute exists to provide a centre of intellectual debate for conservatives and classical liberals and their democratic opponents in Central Europe. Based in Budapest and Washington, D. C., it seeks to engage with centre-right institutions, scholars, political parties and individuals of achievement across the region to discuss problems of mutual interest.

Concurrently, in February 2015 O'Sullivan also became the editor of the Australian monthly magazine Quadrant. In January 2017 he stepped down as editor and became the international editor.

O'Sullivan has published articles in Encounter, Commentary, The New York Times, The Washington Post, Policy Review, The Times Literary Supplement, The American Spectator, The Spectator, The American Conservative, Quadrant, The Hibernian, the Hungarian Review and other journals, and is the author of The President, the Pope, and the Prime Minister (Washington, D.C.: Regnery, 2006), a publication which was praised by philosopher Roger Scruton in his 2014 book How to Be a Conservative for "forcefully" arguing "that the simultaneous presence in the highest offices of Reagan, Thatcher and Pope John Paul II was the cause of the Soviet collapse. And my [Scruton's] own experience confirms this."

John O'Sullivan is the Bruges Group's representative in Washington DC.

Anne Applebaum interviewed O'Sullivan in fall of 2019 for her book Twilight of Democracy, stating: "... he did respond to every question with some version of 'whataboutism'..."

== Views ==
=== O'Sullivan's first law ===
He is known for O'Sullivan's first law, or O'Sullivan's law, stating: "All organizations that are not actually right-wing will over time become left-wing." The law is sometimes (mistakenly) referred to as Robert Conquest's second law of politics.

=== Neo-Stalinism ===
O'Sullivan is extremely critical of neo-Stalinism and sees the ideology as worthy of mockery. He has said of Grover Furr, a neo-Stalinist Montclair State University professor of mediaeval English literature, that he is "a 'historian' who denies that Stalin committed any crimes at all. [...] On reading this, my first reaction was that Grover Furr must be a fictional character or teasing Internet hoax. Revisionist historians nostalgic for 'really existing socialism' have long sought to minimize the number of Stalin's victims and the scale of Soviet crimes. But the extravagance of Furr's claims — every accusation against Stalin false! — made it hard to take them seriously. They amount less to revisionism than to outright denial of historical reality."

=== Multiculturalism ===
In an article, O'Sullivan wrote: "After all, radical Islamists have three advantages on their side: demography (the populations of Islamic nations are increasing while the West suffers a 'birth dearth'); rapidly growing Islamic diasporas in the West, fueled by illegal immigration; and official Western policies of multiculturalism (which not only encourage immigrants to retain their original cultural identity but even promote the 'de-assimilation' of previously assimilated minorities in the West)...the decline of Christian belief and social influence; and the habit of respecting other cultures as unities while treating the West as a kind of multi-cultural supermarket in which Western civilization is merely one rather dusty shelf. To these trends politicians add appeasement, both diplomatic (of neighboring North Africa) and electoral (of local Muslim constituencies)".

On July 18, 2005, O'Sullivan wrote an article titled, "The Islamic Republic of Holland. How One Nation Deals with a Revolutionary Problem".

In a 2017 review, O'Sullivan says "The new policy [encouraging migration] accelerated the transformation of Britain into a multicultural society with racial and religious tensions; terrorist murders, bombings, and beheadings; physical attacks on gays in East London; the extraordinary epidemic of the rape and sexual grooming of underage girls...hostile demonstrations against British soldiers returning from Afghanistan; an estimated (by the British Medical Association) 74,000 cases of female genital mutilation by 2006; the occasional honor killing; and excellent restaurants".

=== Authoritarianism ===
In 2018, Dalibor Rohac, senior fellow at The American Enterprise Institute, wrote that O’Sullivan and others had "deliberately blinded themselves to the true nature of [Viktor] Orbán’s regime."

== Private life ==
O'Sullivan currently resides in Budapest with his wife Melissa.

== Bibliography ==
=== Books ===
- O'Sullivan, John (2008), The President, the Pope, and the Prime Minister : Three Who Changed the World, Regnery Publishing
- O'Sullivan, John; Pócza, Kálmán (2015), The Second Term of Viktor Orbán: Beyond Prejudice and Enthusiasm, London Social Affairs Unit, ISBN 978-1-904863-67-0
- O'Sullivan, John (2024), Sleepwalking Into Wokeness: How We Got Here, Academica Press, ISBN 978-1-68053-329-3

=== Essays and reporting ===
- "Cultural Revolutions Then and Now", Hungarian Review, Vol. 11, No. 4, 13 July 2020.
- "Foreword: Making Democracy Irrelevant", in: Mark Sidwell, The Long March: How the Left Won the Culture War and What to Do About It, London: New Culture Forum, 2020.
- O'Sullivan, John (January–February 2016). "Chronicle". Quadrant. 60 (1–2): 5–6.
- — (January–February 2018). "Asperities". Quadrant. 62 (1–2 [543]): 8–9.
