= Lesoreid uprising =

1942 prisoner uprising in the Ust-Usinsk area

The Lesoreid uprising
- Part of Eastern Front of World War II
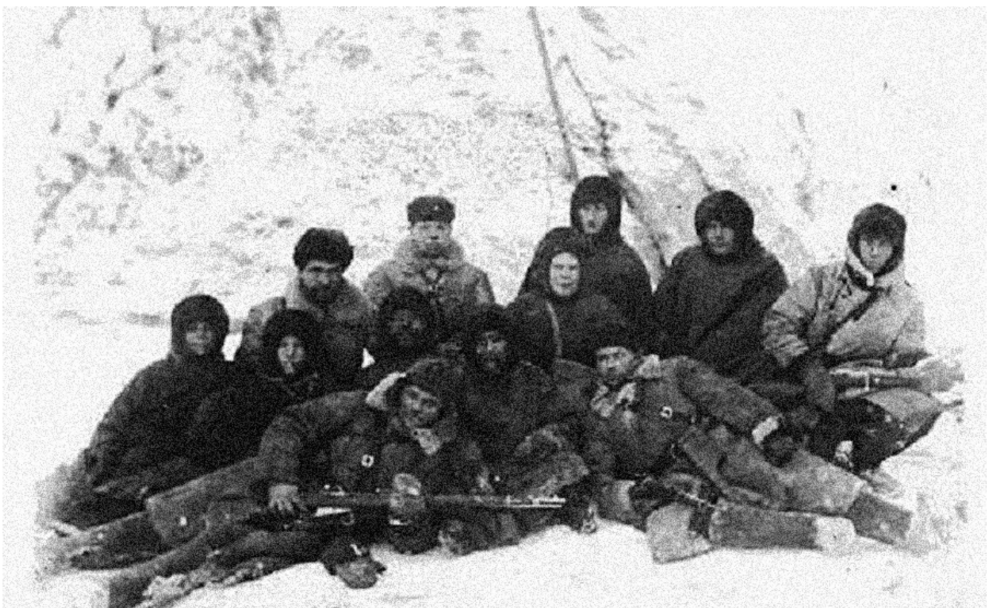
Date	24 January - 6 March 1942
Location	Vorkutlag, lagpunkt
Result	Lesoreid rebels defeated

Belligerents
Red Army; Prison Guards; NKVD; VOKhR	Mark Retyunin; Camp prisoners Non-prisoners; Lesoreid rebels

Casualties and losses
33 killed, 20 wounded, 52 frostbitten	42 killed, 50 sentenced to execution, 18 sentenced to prison terms

The Ust-Usa prisoner uprising also known as the Retyunin's revolt or the Lesoreid uprising was an uprising of prisoners at the Lesoreid subcamp of Vorkutlag near the village of Ust-Usa (Ust-Udinsky District, Komi Autonomous Soviet Socialist Republic), which took place at the beginning of 1942. The leader of the uprising was the head of the camp, a former prisoner himself, Mark Retyunin. The first armed uprising in the Soviet camp system (GULAG) began on January 24, 1942, and lasted ten days. During the confrontation, 75 rebels and NKVD employees were killed; 50 rebels were sentenced to capital punishment.

== Background ==
"Lesoreid" (Russian: Лесорейд, "timber anchorage") was a subcamp of Vorkutlag, located approximately 6 km from the village of Ust-Usa. As of December 1, 1941, there were 202 prisoners in Lesoreid, of which 108 were political prisoners, convicted under Article 58 (RSFSR Penal Code) (including 27 former Trotskyists). The head of the camp, Mark Retyunin, a native of the Arkhangelsk region, was convicted of banditry (participation in a bank robbery) in 1929, was released early in 1939 and left in Vorkutlag as a civilian. The uprising was well planned and prepared: back in the fall of 1941, Retyunin ordered food and clothing from the base in large quantities, including white fur coats. At the same time, there were no NKVD operational personnel at the camp; agents from among the prisoners could not report the preparation of an uprising. However, the performance was prepared in secret from most of the prisoners - no more than 15 people knew about the impending uprising, among whom were both criminal and political. The winter period was chosen due to the fact that in other seasons it would be impossible to quickly travel along winter roads. It was planned, having freed the Lesoreid prisoners and disarmed the guards, to unexpectedly capture Ust-Usa, paralyzing the local administration, after which the main detachment would make a rush to Kozhva, where the railway ran, and from there move in two directions - to Kotlas and Vorkuta, liberating prisoners along the way from other camps who would join the rebels, thus gathering a fairly powerful army. It was assumed that this army would also be joined by special settlers and the local population, who would need to agitate against the collective farms.

== The Uprising, 24 January - 6 March ==
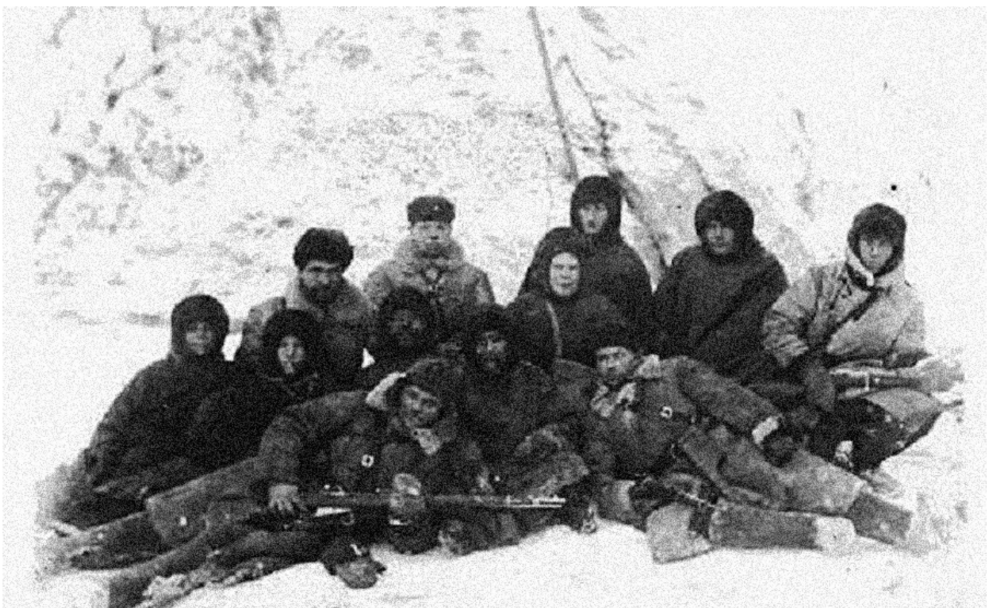
Soviet Military Guard after the Suppression of the Lesoreid Uprising

On January 24, 1942, having lured most of the guards to wash in the bathhouse, the prisoners disarmed the rest (one VOKHR [camp guard] shooter was killed and another was wounded), after which, locking all the Vokhrovites in a vegetable storehouse, they opened the camp zone and announced to everyone about the uprising. The prisoners received winter military uniforms and assembled a food train from 8 carts. Some of the prisoners (59 people), not wanting to participate in the uprising, fled. The rest, under the command of Retyunin, under the guise of training of the VOKHR detachment, marched to Ust-Usa, having 12 Rifles and 4 Revolvers for 82 people. The battles at various sites in Ust-Usa lasted until midnight, during which the rebels lost 9 people killed. And they themselves killed 14 and wounded 11 people, and also captured several more weapons and freed 38 prisoners of the local detention center, 12 of whom joined the rebel camp inmates. At the same time, 40 unarmed rebels were detained, another 21 people subsequently voluntarily reported to the regional department of the NKVD. On the night of January 25, the detachment, having liberated the Kyz-Raz-Di camp sub-command, overtook and captured a VOKHR weapons convoy in the village of Akis. Then in the morning the detachment went to the village of Ust-Pyzha (at the confluence of the Lezha (river) with lPechora), where they picked up various food and household equipment from a general store. The "military commissar" of the detachment, A. T. Makeev (a major business executive, arrested in 1938 in the case of a right-wing Trotskyist organization in the Komi Autonomous Soviet Socialist Republic, Art. 58) left a receipt for the general store saleswoman on behalf of "Special Purpose Detachment No. 41." At that time, the number of the detachment was 41 people, they were well armed (41 Mosin rifles, 15 revolvers and several pistols of various brands, more than 10 thousand rounds of ammunition, etc.) On the evening of January 27, reconnaissance of the VOKHR detachment, sent to search for and destroy the rebels, came across them 65 km from Ust-Lyzha. On the morning of January 28, a battle broke out in the forest 105 km from the village of Ust-Usa on the Lyzha River; as a result, 16 rebels were killed (including A.T. Makeev), the Vokhrovites also lost 16 people. killed and 9 people. wounded (two of whom later died in the infirmary), with a significant number coming under fire from their own platoons due to inept leadership. In addition, the Vokhrovites were poorly equipped, and most of them received frostbite of various degrees. The pursuit of the detachment continued with the help of other units of the camp guard. On January 29, in a hunting hut in the upper reaches of the Lyzha River, the rebels, of whom 26 people remained, held a council and decided to split into groups to try to go to the Bolshezemelskaya tundra to join the Nenets reindeer herders. From January 30 to February 1, the persecution and destruction of these groups by VOKHR forces continued. On the evening of February 1, the third, main group, which included the leadership of the rebels led by M. Retyunin (11 people), was overtaken by the Vokhrovites in the upper reaches of the Malaya Terekhovey River (a tributary of the Lyzha River) 175 km from Ust-Lyzha and surrounded. After a 23-hour battle, having used up almost all the ammunition, the leaders of the uprising (M. A. Retyunin, "chief of staff" of the detachment M. V. Dunaev) and four other rebels shot themselves. Two people - A.I. Yashkin and the Chinese Liu Fa - were captured, two more were shot on the spot.

== Result ==
In total, 42 participants died during the uprising, and six were captured alive. 40 people left the detachment after the raid on Ust-Usa and 21 voluntarily returned to the regional department of the RO NKVD. On September 16, 1942, 50 defendants, among whom were both prisoners and civilians, were sentenced by the OSO NKVD of the USSR to Capital punishment, and another 18 people to various terms of Imprisonment. The losses of the NKVD and VOKHR units amounted to 33 people killed, 20 wounded and 52 frostbitten. Grade The Ust-Usinsk uprising of 1942 is considered the first mass uprising of prisoners and guards in the history of the Soviet gulag. Evidence of the rebels' global plans varies. There are reports according to which Retyunin offered to "make his way to the front and join some unit or partisan in the rear of the Germans," one of the captured participants said the same thing. During interrogations, A. Yashkin initially spoke only of his intention to achieve the release of prisoners of Vorkutlag and Pechorlag, but after 10 days, the topic of overthrowing the Soviet government, dissolving Collective farms, establishing ties with Germany in order to receive armed assistance from the Wehrmacht and establish political and economic system "in the type and likeness of Germany", to annex the territory occupied by the rebels "either to fascist Germany or Finland." In Soviet documents, despite the fact that most of its leaders were political prisoners rather than criminals, the uprising was regarded as a "gangster uprising."
