= Lagpunkt =

Subcamp of a Gulag labor camp

A lagpunkt (Russian: Отдельный лагерный пункт, лагерный пункт, лагпункт), literally "camp point" or lagotdelenie (Russian: лаготделение, лагерное отделение, literally "camp detachment), may be translated as "subcamp", "camp unit", or "camp site" was a separate settlement subordinated to a major Gulag forced labor camp. Lagpunkts were convenient to decrease the time and hassle of transport of inmates to remote job sites. At the same time this remoteness created difficulties for the delivery of food supplies, especially in winter.

Anne Appelbaum in her Gulag: A History occasionally translates the term as "base camp", along with using the Russian term. Other authors use the term "base camp" for the main location of the camp.

Many camps, especially operating logging had big number of lagpunkts to man work in a particular areas. Some of them did not have a name, only number and housed about a 100 of inmates. In general, lagpunkts were of varying sizes: from several dozen to several thousand inmates. Their lifetime also varied greatly: some existed from 1920s into 1980s (when were converted into prisons or colonies), while others lasted for a summer season only or, keeping the number, moved to another location.

Anne Appelbaum remarks that most descriptions of Gulag geography report about 500 locations, but in fact there was much more than that: many major camps had from dozens to hundreds smaller sub-units, which are close to impossible to count.

There were other terms for temporary job locations of labor camp: kolonna ("column", in reference of "worker columns' of a labor army) a lagpunkt for road construction; komandirovka (work trip; the generic meaning of the term is "business trip"); distantsiya ("distance"), for railroad construction camp detachments for a particular stretch ("distance") of a railroad.
