= Gulag: A History =

2003 book by Anne Applebaum

- 2003 hardcover first edition
- Author: Anne Applebaum
- Language: English
- Subject: Gulag, Concentration camps, History of the Soviet Union, Forced labor
- Genre: Nonfiction Soviet History
- Publisher: Doubleday
- Publication date: 2003
- Publication place: United States
- Pages: 679 pp.
- ISBN: 0767900561

Gulag: A History, also published as Gulag: A History of the Soviet Camps, is a nonfiction book covering the history of the Soviet Gulag system. It was written by American author Anne Applebaum and published in 2003 by Doubleday. Gulag won the 2004 Pulitzer Prize for General Nonfiction and the 2004 Duff Cooper Prize. It was also nominated for the National Book Critics Circle prize and for the National Book Award.

The book charts the history of the Gulag organization; from its beginnings under Vladimir Lenin and the Solovki prison camp, to the construction of the White Sea Canal, through its explosive growth in the Great Purge and the Second World War. The book tracks its diminution following the death of Joseph Stalin and its final closure in the 1980s. A large portion of the book is devoted to covering lives and deaths of camp inmates, including their arrest, interrogation, trial, transportation, the details of the rigors of their working and living conditions, the privations of starvation and disease, and the circumstances of their deaths. The book draws heavily on Soviet-era archives and on the diaries and writings of camp survivors, including the works of Aleksandr Solzhenitsyn, Varlam Shalamov, and Gustaw Herling-Grudziński, among many others.

== Background ==
The author of the book, Anne Applebaum, has been described as a "historian with a particular expertise in the history of communist and post-communist Europe." Gulag was Applebaum's first widely acclaimed publication, followed by Iron Curtain: The Crushing of Eastern Europe, 1944-1956 published in 2012 and Red Famine: Stalin's War on Ukraine published in 2017. Gulag earned her the Pulitzer Prize for General Nonfiction in 2004.

Though Applebaum was born in Washington D.C., her ancestors immigrated to the U.S. from what is now Belarus. In her book Between East and West, she describes learning about her family's migration from the Soviet Union to the U.S. at an early age and how surprised she was to be connected to Belarus which she learned was a place with a "shifty, uncertain identity." As a student in university, she spent the summer of 1985 in Leningrad in the former Soviet Union, and attributes this trip to having shaped her current world views. Applebaum views have been criticized, especially in this book, for being "far enough to the right that conservative reviewers have written fawningly about [it]". In a 2015 article for Commentary magazine, Applebaum concludes about younger people and modern opinions on the Soviet Union: "And because they don't remember how we undermined the KGB, they aren't yet prepared to resist the KGB, who are once again dedicating themselves to undermining the rules of the civilized world." The author's public right-leaning political stance has been criticized for influencing her arguments presented in Gulag.

The book is a compilation of first-hand testimonies of what was lived in the Gulag concentration camps, and the author praises Russian author Aleksandr Solzhenitsyn along with countless other authors as a source for her investigation and for their ability to "probe beneath the surface of everyday horror and to discover deeper truths about the human condition."

== Overview ==
=== Introduction ===
The author opens the book with a quote from Alexander Tvardovsky's autobiographical poem By Right of Memory, in which he details how all men who arrived at the Gulags were branded as traitors regardless of their social standing or connections. Applebaum's introduction begins by defining the acronym "Gulag", meaning "Glavnoye Upravleniye Lagerey", which translates to Main Camp Administration. She also explains that the concept of the "Gulags" began to be used more broadly to refer to the entire Soviet imprisonment system itself, beginning from the arrests to the forced labor, exiles, and deaths. Applebaum describes how Gulags were used to further Stalin's industrialization and economic plans through their forced labor and how by the end of the 1930s "[the camps] could be found in every one of the Soviet Union's twelve time zones."

Applebaum argues that the camps as "systems of mass forced labor involving millions of people" disappeared when Stalin died. She explains that from 1929 to Stalin's death in 1953, an approximate of 18 million people passed through the system of the Gulags. However, she maintains that the camps were transformed and put to use as prisons for democratic activists and criminals well into the 1970s and early 1980s.

Applebaum goes on to compare the atrocities faced in the Nazi camps to those in the Soviet Gulags. She states that "in both societies, the creation of concentration camps was actually the final stage in a long process of dehumanization [...]". Applebaum notes several distinctions and concludes one of them being that "the soviet camp system as a whole was not deliberately organized to mass-produce corpses [as opposed to the Nazi camps]—even if, at times, it did." She highlights that it is difficult to compare and contrast these two systems, but that in the study of European history the comparison cannot be ignored. The cross-cultural study can reveal the camps' developments, conditions, cruelty, and organization.

=== Part I: The Origins of the Gulag, 1917-1939 ===
The first part of Gulag covers the takeover of the Bolsheviks after the revolution and Lenin's initial measures for social control. The author details testimonies of people who were imprisoned during this time, in disorganized prisons left over from the monarchy's management. Applebaum states that one of the earliest appearances of the term kontslager (or concentration camp) comes in June 4. 1918 from Leon Trotsky.

The emergence of Solovetsky is described by the author as one of utmost significance, not only for its survivors but for its staff and the secret police as well. Applebaum quotes the then system's chief administrator as claiming "not only that the camp system originated in Solovetsky in 1920, but also that the entire Soviet system of 'forced labor as a method of re-education 'began there in 1926'". She then goes in depth to describe specific testimonies of prisoner's experiences at the Solovetsky camp.

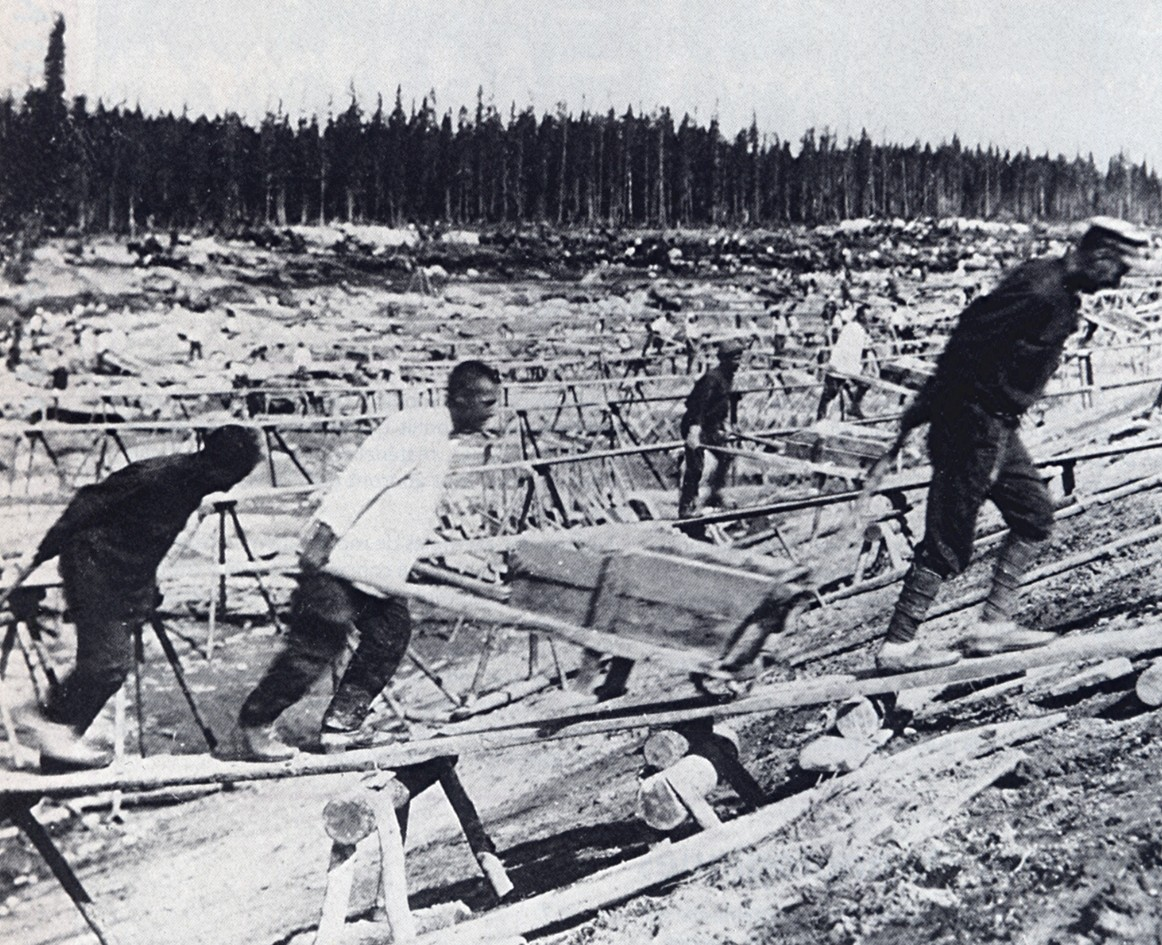
Prisoner labor at the construction of the Belomorkanal (White Sea Canal).

Applebaum describes the lack of structure of the earliest camps based on several first-hand accounts. On the topic of prisoners being used for slave labor she also specifically states:

If the arrests were intended to populate the camps, then they did so with almost ludicrous inefficiency. Martin and others have also pointed out that every wave of mass arrests seems to have caught camp commanders completely by surprise, making it difficult for them to achieve even a semblance of economic efficiency. Nor did the arresting officer ever choose their victims rationally: instead of limiting arrests to the healthy young men who would have made the best laborers in the far north, they also imprisoned women, children, and old people in large numbers. The sheer illogic of the mass arrests seems to argue against the idea of a carefully planned slave-labor force—leading many to conclude that arrests were carried out primarily to eliminate Stalin's perceived enemies, and only secondarily to fill Stalin's camps.

The White Sea Canal construction (Belomorkanal) is detailed in this section, described as a momentous moment as it was a symbol of success for Stalin. Applebaum describes the project as "the first, last, and only Gulag project ever exposed to the full light of Soviet propaganda, both at home and abroad". By the end of the 1930s, the camps had evolved into "a full-fledged 'camp-industrial complex', with internal rules and habitual practices, special distribution systems and hierarchies."

However, the camps were not completely hidden from the international eye. Reports detailing the Russian's use of forced labor in manufacturing goods and supplies were published in the German, French, British, and American press. There were several international entities condemning the use of slave labor, and as the news evolved the negative focus shifted from its ethics to its economic threat to "Western business interests". In the United States, with help from trade unions, the Tariff Act of 1930 was passed which stated: "All goods [...] mined, produced, or manufactured [...] by convict labor or/and forced labor [...] shall not be entitled to entry at any of the ports of the United States."

Applebaum concludes that by the start of the 1940s, there was an established camp system set in place which would undergo little change until Stalin's death.

=== Part II: Life and Work in the Camps ===
The second part of Gulag describes the many ways in which the Soviet government justified arrests, including having foreign ties, being a refugee, or simply being in the wrong place at the wrong time. The author details torture tactics used during interrogations and their psychological impacts. Applebaum describes the accounts of the different prisons that were built across the Soviet Union, and how the experiences differed widely from their populations and their strict rules and regulations.

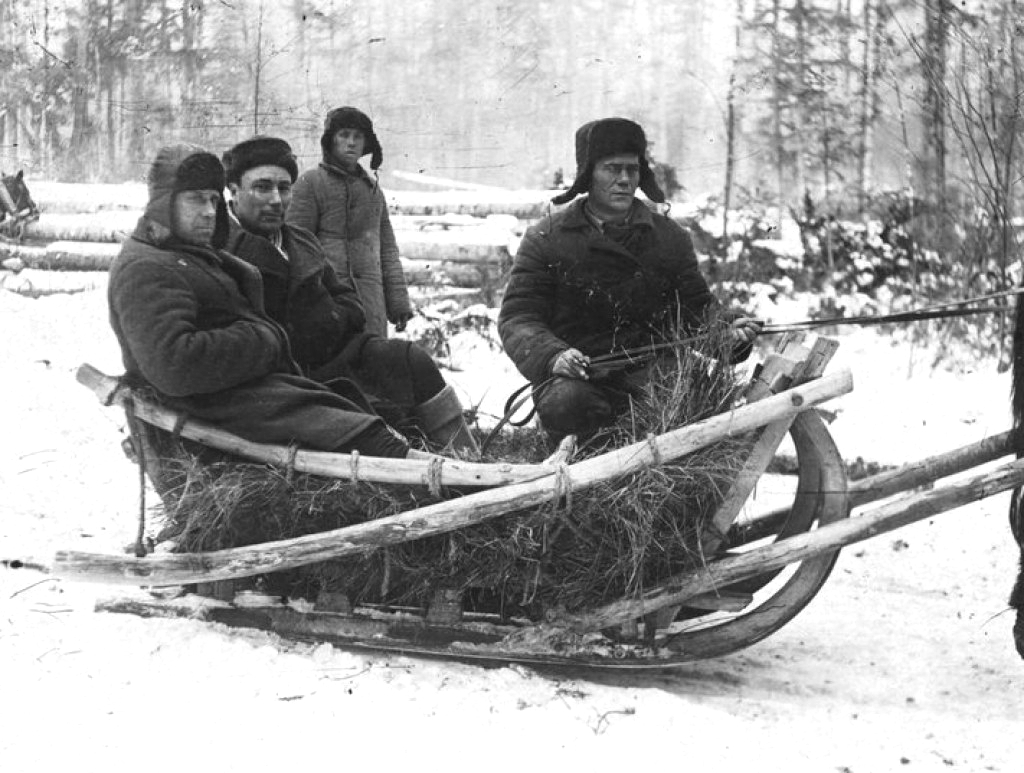
Gulag prisoners at work 1936-1937

After the arrest of prisoners, Applebaum dedicates a section to the experience once people were initially imprisoned. As there were strict rules for silence in most camps, the author explains how codes were invented in order to communicate with other prisoners across the walls. "Even those who had not read about the code or learned it from others sometimes figured it out, as there were standard methods of teaching it." In one case, American survivor Alexander Dolgun was able to learn a code in Lefortovo. When he was finally able to "talk" to the man in the next cell, and understood that the man was asking him 'Who are you?' he felt 'a rush of pure love for a man who has been asking me for three months who I am'."

Transportation across the camps was also described as a brutal part of the prisoners' experience, in many cases suffering extreme dehydration and having nowhere but an often frozen-over hole in the floor of the train carts to relieve themselves. Through the account of Evgeniya Ginzburg, Applebaum explains how even in the cases where prisoners received a cup of water a day, they were "tormented" in having to decide "whether to drink their whole cup in the morning, or try to save it."

The camps did not live up to the ideal set forth by Moscow officials, who despite regular visits could not manage to make the camps function in the economically efficient way in which they were designed. The conditions in the camps are described by the author as ones of extreme neglect, especially during the coldest and hottest months, during which the temperature changes were not accounted for in the prisoners' workload or food rations.

Applebaum goes into detail on the experience of guards and prisoners, including the specific experience of women and children. The author also explores the accounts of strategies for survival, as well as those successful moments of rebellion and escape experienced in the camps. The author concludes that rebellions, such as the Lesoreid uprising and some successful escapes from the Solovetsky camps, were signs of the beginning of the end for the Gulag.

=== Part III: The Rise and Fall of the Camp-Industrial Complex, 1940-1986 ===
The third part of Gulag is dedicated to the effects of the war on the camps, their transformation once the war ended, the effects of Stalin's death, and the eventual dissolution of the system all-together.

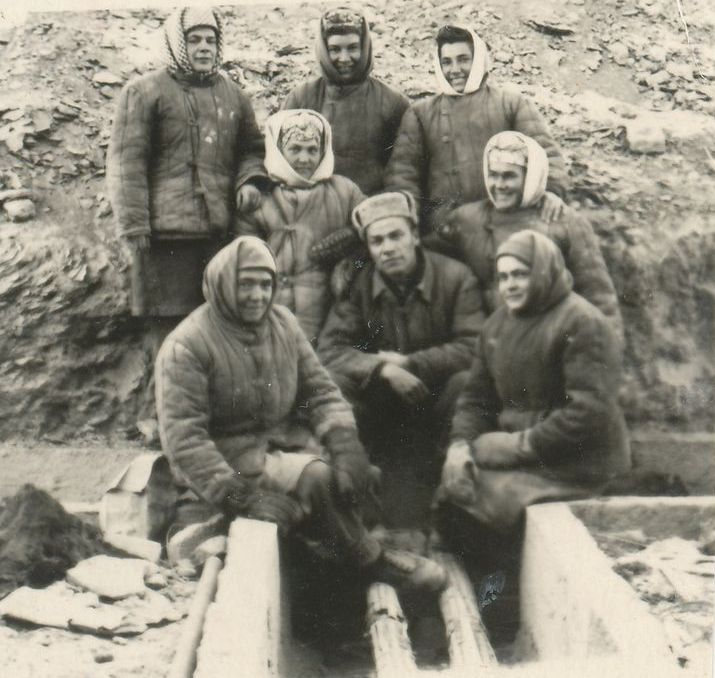
A group of political prisoners in Kengir, part of the Soviet Gulag system. Lithuanian prisoner Aleksandra Kišonaitė is in the last row on the right. She was arrested in May 1949.

As the Soviet Union entered the war officially in 1941, the effects of war efforts and spending was felt in camps: "Although mass executions were not as common as they had been in 1937 and 1938, prisoner mortality rates for 1942 and 1943 are nevertheless the highest in the Gulag's history." The prisoners were a vital part of war production for the Soviet army, and yet the effects of the war caused disease to run rampant and a dramatic lack of food making conditions unlivable. Political and foreign prisoners were also particularly targeted in the camps as potential enemies of the state. In the Kolyma camp, their rights to "read letters and newspapers" and their access to radios were cut off during this time.

A pivotal moment in the Gulag's history was Stalin's death, allowing the reconsideration of the camps' structures by other members of the government without worries of repercussions. Lavrentiy Beria, one of the heads of the secret police forces, wrote a memo to the Presidium of the Central Committee arguing that there were over 2.5 million inmates, of whom only 221,435 were genuinely "dangerous state criminals", and argued in favor of the release of many. Releases and amnesty began in the year of Stalin's death. Applebaum writes, "the death of Stalin really did signal the end of the era of massive slave labor in the Soviet Union."

Applebaum goes on to recount the events of revolutions that occurred within many camps after the death of Stalin, given the widespread rumors and preoccupation on the fate of the camps. After failed protests and strikes within the Gulags, especially that of the Kengir uprising, the leaders of the Soviet Union began to plan for the dissolution of the camps.

By the summer of 1954, the unprofitability of the camps was widely recognized. Another survey of the Gulag's finances, carried out in June 1954, had again shown that they were heavily subsidized, and that the costs of guards in particular made them unprofitable. [...] The incentive to change was now overwhelming—and change came.

The author closes this last part with a poem by Alexander Tvardovsky, whose poetry is also featured at the opening of the book.

=== Epilogue: Memory ===
The epilogue begins with Applebaum's retelling of her experience while traveling and researching content for the book across the White Sea. The author details her experience in 1998, speaking to Russians on the ferry boat visiting the Solovetsky Islands and how they were discontented with her researching the Soviet Gulags. She explains how some of the passengers became "hostile" towards her, asking why "foreigners only care about the ugly things in our history" and stating that "the Gulag isn't relevant anymore". She explores the lasting memory of the Gulags across different nations formerly belonging to or affected by the Soviet Union, including Belarus, Hungary, Latvia, and Lithuania, among others. Applebaum states how there has been a disregard and erasure of history within modern Russia on the subject of the concentration camps: "Tragically, Russia's lack of interest in its past has deprived the Russians of heroes, as well as victims." Here she refers to the rebellion leaders, the dissidents, the writers, and many others in the Soviet's opposition. She adds a description of her visit to a modern prison in Arkhangelsk in 1998, and how similar the conditions and attitudes of the prisoners were to those she'd read about in memoirs of the Gulags in the 1930s.

Applebaum concludes that citizens of the "West" have a responsibility to acknowledge the Soviet past and to not forget what has mobilized them and held together "the civilization of the West".

In her closing paragraph she concludes:

This book was not written 'so that it will not happen again', as the cliché would have it. This book was written because it almost certainly will happen again. Totalitarian philosophies have had, and will continue to have, a profound appeal to many millions of people. Destruction of the 'objective enemy', as Hannah Arendt once put it, remains a fundamental object of many dictatorships. We need to know why—and each story, each memoir, each document in the history of the Gulag is a piece of the puzzle, a part of the explanation. Without them, we will wake up one day and realize that we do not know who we are.

The book also includes an appendix detailing the estimates of prisoners and victims that passed through the Gulags.

== Critical reception ==
In its year of publication, New York Times journalist Steven Merritt Miner wrote of Applebaum's book: "It is fervently to be hoped that people will read Anne Applebaum's excellent, tautly written and very damning history." Another positive review came from David Remnick at The New Yorker, stating: "Through copious quotation and anecdote, Applebaum methodically, and unflinchingly, provides a sense of what it was like to enter and inhabit the netherworld of the Gulag" and as drawing on "an impressive range of sources—camp memoirs, literary works, archival material, personal interviews, and histories in a variety of languages." Remnick praises Applebaum for publishing a book that should be welcomed as a comprehensive work on the lesser-known subject of Gulags (as opposed to the Holocaust). On a review for Booklist published by the American Library Association, author Jay Freeman writes: "With the collapse of the Soviet Union and the gradual opening of KGB archives, the full horror of the Gulag is gradually emerging, and Applebaum has done a masterful job of chronicling the origin, growth, and eventual end of this monstrous system." Robert Service, in a piece for The Guardian, wrote that "she tells a gripping and convincing story about the Soviet camp system".

In a review published by the Santa Clara Law Review, attorney Dana Neacşu noted that, according to Applebaum, the "Gulag was a mirror image of the Soviet society" and the Soviet labor camp system and the Nazi concentration camps were very similar. Hence she "indicted the entire Soviet system by association" The reviewer disagreed with such conclusions.

== Awards ==
Gulag received two notable awards, and was nominated for several others.

Year	Award/Honor	Category	Result	Ref.
2003	The National Book Critics Circle Award	General Nonfiction	Finalist	
2003	National Book Awards	Nonfiction	Finalist	
2004	Pulitzer Prize	General Nonfiction	Winner	
2004	Duff Cooper Prize	Nonfiction Writing	Winner	
2004	Samuel Johnson Prize (renamed to the Baillie Gifford Prize in 2015)	Nonfiction	Nominated	
