= Too Dumb for Democracy? =

2019 book by political scientist David Moscrop

- Author: David Moscrop
- Language: English
- Genre: Political science
- Published: 2019
- Publisher: Goose Lane Editions
- Publication place: Canada
- Pages: 265
- ISBN: 9781773100418

Too Dumb for Democracy? Why We Make Bad Political Decisions and How We Can Make Better Ones is a 2019 book by political scientist David Moscrop.

The book discusses how people make decisions against their best interests, explains why, and advocates for more careful analysis of political information.

It received positive critique from The Toronto Star.

== Publication ==
Too Dumb for Democracy? was published in 2019 by Goose Lane Editions and was written by political scientist David Moscrop.

== Synopsis ==
The book focuses on why people make political decisions against their own self-interest, documenting the extent to which people are manipulated by bad-faith actors.

In the book, Moscrop argues that democracy is under threat but can be saved, emphasising the need for good process to resolve disagreements.

The book documents the neuroscience of human decision making, and breaks decisions into two types that Moscrop calls "autopilot" and "long-form", stating that people too frequently rely on the former when the later would serve them better. He writes of the importance of wanting to make better decisions and learning how to do so.

== Critical reception ==
Christine Sismondo, writing in The Toronto Star, describes the book as highly readable as well as noting the strength of the arguments contained.
