= Red Famine =

2017 book by Anne Applebaum

Red Famine: Stalin's War on Ukraine
- UK first-edition cover
- Author: Anne Applebaum
- Language: English
- Genre: Non-fiction
- Set in: Ukraine
- Publisher: Allen Lane, Doubleday, Penguin Random House
- Publication date: 2017
- Publication place: United States
- Media type: Print (hardback and paperback)
- Pages: 512
- Awards: Lionel Gelber Prize, Duff Cooper Prize
- ISBN: 978-0-241-00380-0
- OCLC: 1056194977
- Preceded by: From a Polish Country House Kitchen
- Followed by: Twilight of Democracy

Red Famine: Stalin's War on Ukraine is a 2017 non-fiction book by American-Polish historian Anne Applebaum, focusing on the history of the Holodomor. The book won the Lionel Gelber Prize and the Duff Cooper Prize.

The book received a number of positive reviews from the mainstream Western press, such as The New York Times and The Guardian; however, there were also negative reviews by some academics.

== Reviews ==
Taras Kuzio writing for the Europe-Asia Studies in 2018 said that Applebaum's book follows in the footsteps of Robert Conquest's The Harvest of Sorrow (1986), but benefits from improved access to Soviet archives. He also says that her work is also more up to date, touching upon issues such as post-communist, 21st century Russian disinformation. He says that the discussion of Holodomor denial and cover-up is the strongest part of her book, and concludes that Red Famine is a "masterful", up-to-date 21st-century topic.

Stephen G. Wheatcroft writing for Contemporary European History, states that, right from the beginning, Applebaum indicates that she thinks that the famine was a result of someone's mentality and her objective is to find out who to blame for it. Wheatcroft says that her view conforms to "an increasingly popular trend in Soviet history to ignore or oversimplify complex economic explanations and to reduce everything to moral judgments". He additionally criticized Applebaum for her treatment of grain availability in Ukraine, which, according to Wheatcroft, "epitomizes the dangers of misunderstanding the [archival] data" and for other "factual[ly] incorrect" information.

In writing for the History News Network, Mark Tauger criticized Applebaum's usage of Ukrainian nationalist arguments, which stressed the distinction between Russian and Ukrainian cultures and farming methods, while downplaying Stalin's simultaneous purges against Russian intellectuals and famines in the Russian Soviet Federative Socialist Republic. Tauger concluded that "it leaves out too much important information, has false claims on key points, and draws unjustified conclusions on important issues based on incomplete use of sources, making it not even close to the level of genuine scholarship".

Christophe Guilluy states that "the treatment of the famine itself ... is moving and largely convincing", but that "the book's weakness is the historical framework into which Applebaum seeks to place the events", which suffers from "nationally centered narratives".

Applebaum's book has received extensive praise from academics as well. Alan Whitehorn describes it as "a thoughtful and quite detailed volume on one of the most brutally dark pages of twentieth century history." Norman M. Naimark says, "Applebaum's book is an extremely important addition to the historiography of the Holodomor and of the Soviet Union. Red Famine will be read and discussed by a generation of graduate students and scholars in Soviet and Ukrainian history, as well as, one hopes, by the broader reading public."

Her book is also cited by at least one academic as a reliable source on the topic.

== Editions ==
- Applebaum, Anne (2017), Red Famine: Stalin's War on Ukraine (Hardcover ed.), Allen Lane, ISBN 978-0-241-00380-0
- Applebaum, Anne (2017), Red Famine: Stalin's War on Ukraine (Hardcover ed.), Doubleday, ISBN 978-0-385-53885-5
- Applebaum, Anne (2018), Red Famine: Stalin's War on Ukraine (Paperback ed.), Penguin, ISBN 978-0-14-197828-4
- Applebaum, Anne (2018), Red Famine: Stalin's War on Ukraine (Paperback ed.), Anchor Books, ISBN 978-0-8041-7088-8

== See also ==
- Bibliography of Stalinism and the Soviet Union
- Bloodlands
- Stalin: Waiting for Hitler, 1929–1941
