= Ust-Pyzha =

Rural locality in Altai Republic, Russia

Ust-Pyzha Усть-Пыжа
- Selo
- Location within Altai Republic Location within Russia
- Coordinates: 51°51′N 87°05′E
- Country: Russia
- Region: Altai Republic
- District: Turochaksky District
- Time zone: UTC+7:00

Ust-Pyzha (Russian: Усть-Пыжа; Altay: Пыжы-Оозы, Pıjı-Oozı) is a rural locality (a selo) in Turochaksky District, the Altai Republic, Russia. Its population was 158 as of 2016. There are 5 streets.

== Geography ==
Ust-Pyzha is located 54 km south of Turochak (the district's administrative centre) by road. Kebezen is the nearest rural locality.
