= David Moscrop =

Canadian political scientist

David Moscrop PhD
- Education: University of British Columbia (PhD); University of Ottawa (post-doc)
- Notable work: Too Dumb for Democracy? (2019 book)

David Moscrop is a Canadian podcaster, political scientist, columnist, and the author of the 2019 book Too Dumb for Democracy?

== Education ==
Moscrop has a PhD in political science from the University of British Columbia and was a post-doctoral fellow at the Scholarly Communication Lab at Simon Fraser University and a SSHRC Postdoctoral Fellow at the Centre for Law, Technology and Society at the University of Ottawa.

== Career and views ==
Moscrop has written for both The Washington Post and Maclean's Magazine. He is the author of Too Dumb for Democracy? a 2019 book that documents how people make decisions against their own interests.

He hosts the podcast Open to Debate.

Moscrop advocates for deliberative democracy.

== Personal life ==
Moscrop lives in Ottawa.
