= Danube Institute =

Hungarian think tank

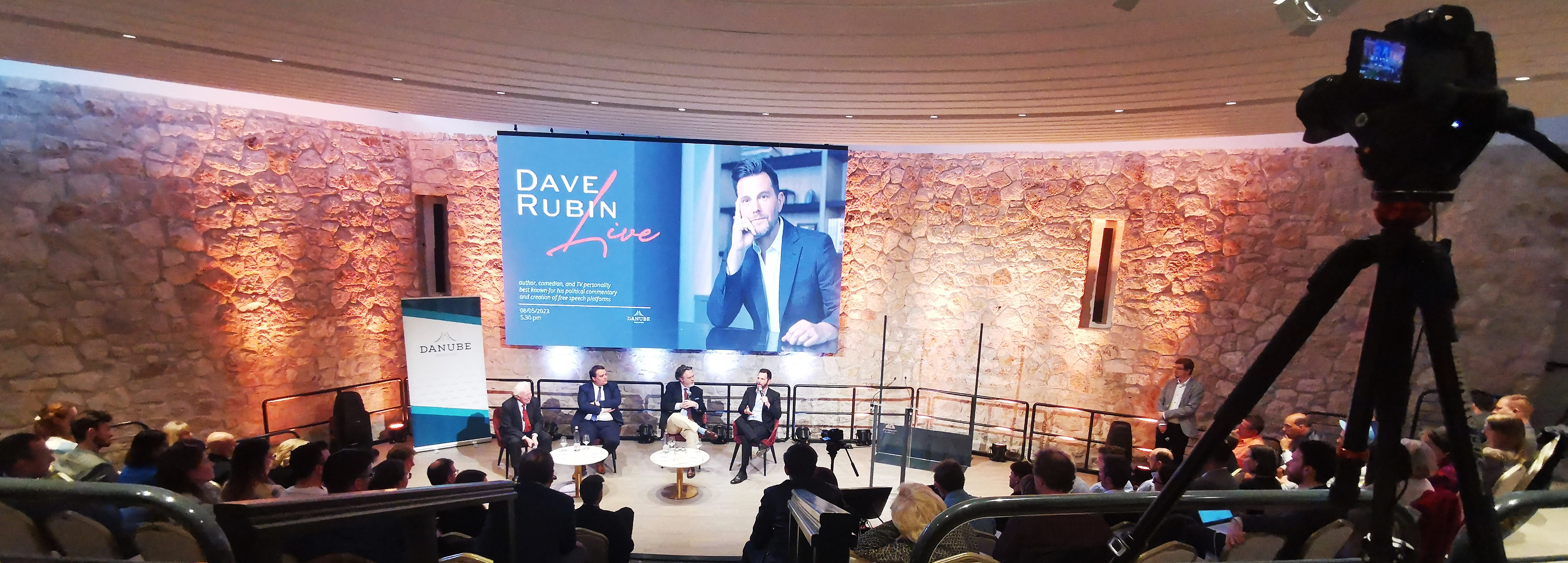
Dave Rubin Live at Danube Institute

The Danube Institute is a think tank situated in Budapest, Hungary, variously described as conservative, postliberal and far-right

In January 2025 it has been identified by the French General Secretariat for Defence and National Security, through its Viginum department, as one of the instruments of a 'Hungarian influence network' for the 'dissemination of anti-European and pro-Russian narratives'.

Following the defeat of the Orban government in the 2026 Hungarian election the Institute has been stripped of public funding and its future is in doubt.

== History ==
The Danube Institute was established in 2013 by the Batthyány Lajos Foundation (BLA).

== Description and aims ==
The Danube Institute, a conservative think tank located in Budapest, is funded by the Hungarian Government through the Batthyány Lajos Foundation.

According to its mission statement, the Danube Institute is dedicated to "a respectful conservatism in cultural, religious, and social life, the broad classical liberal tradition in economics, and a realistic Atlanticism in national security policy."

The Danube Institute focuses on the "transmission of ideas and people" among countries in "Central Europe, other parts of Europe, and the English-speaking world." In its mission statement, the institute proclaims its dedication to a belief that "the nation-state offers the only sure foundation for democracy" and that this "tolerant civic nationalism" is essential for a democratic international world.

The Danube Institute undertakes research, publishes papers and books, and engages in scholarly exchanges. It recognises its primary audience amongst the centre-right, but is committed to dialogue with the centre-left.

The institute hosted its Geopolitical Summit five times between February 2022 and September 2025.

== People ==
As of 2020 John O'Sullivan is the president of the Danube Institute. O'Sullivan is a British journalist and former advisor to Margaret Thatcher. British political scientist David Martin Jones served as the institute's director of research from 2022 until his death in 2024. The current director of research for the Danube Institute is Calum T. M. Nicholson.

Central European politicians associated with the Danube Institute include János Martonyi and Ryszard Legutko.

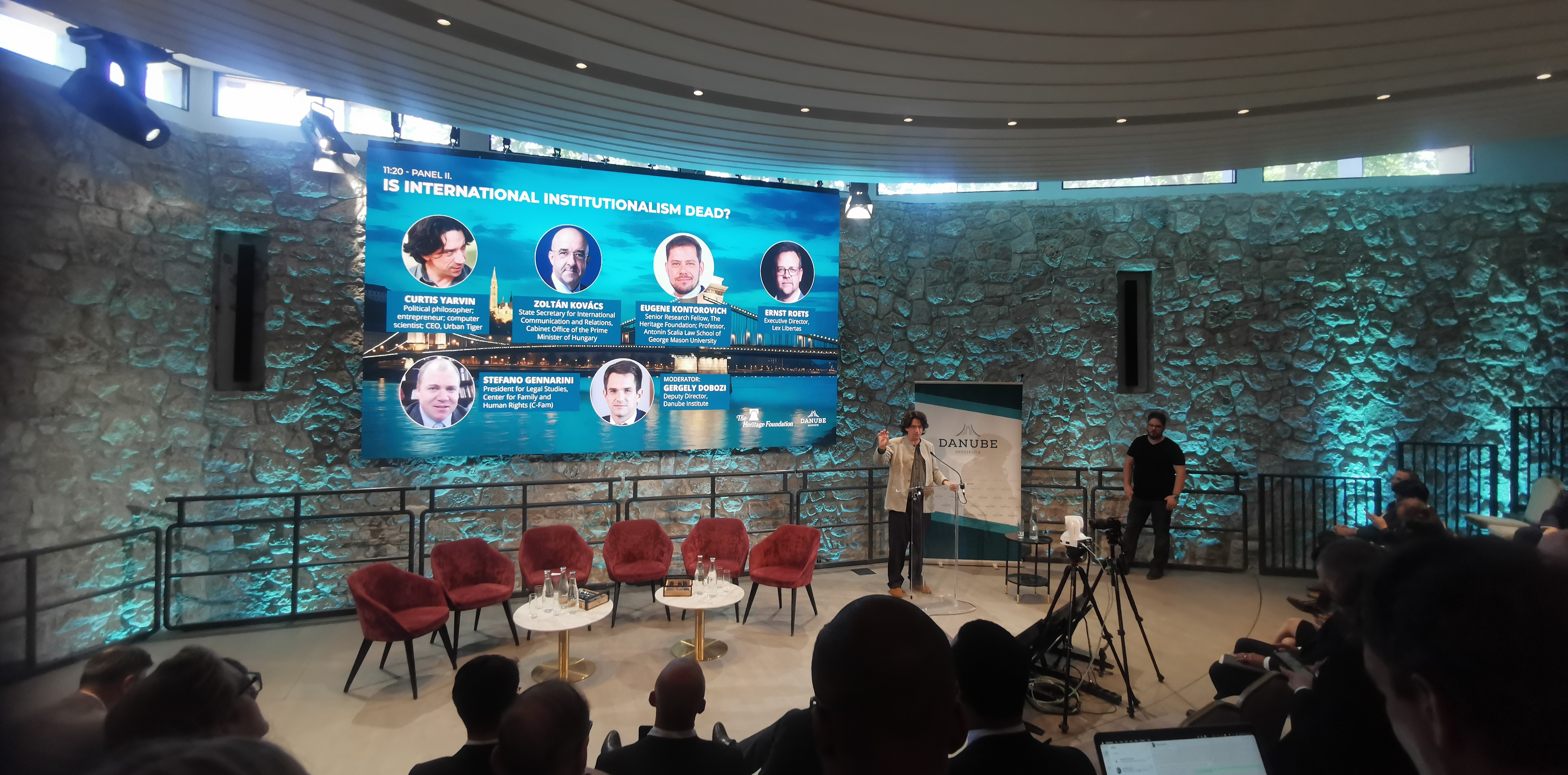
Curtis Yarvin speaking at Geopolitical Summit Budapest 2025

The Danube Institute hosts events in Budapest to present its research to the public audience. In 2019, Tim Montgomerie, former social justice advisor to Boris Johnson and as of 2024 a member of Britain's right-wing Reform Party, spoke at an event held at the Danube Institute, in which he expressed his support for Britain to have "a special relationship with Hungary", following Brexit.

In 2021, the French politician Éric Zemmour gave an interview to the institute.

Former Prime Minister of Australia, Tony Abbott, became a senior visiting fellow of the Danube Institute in 2023.
