= Twilight of Democracy =

2020 book by Anne Applebaum

- Author: Anne Applebaum
- Publisher: Doubleday
- Publication date: 2020
- Pages: 224
- ISBN: 9780385545808

Twilight of Democracy: The Seductive Lure of Authoritarianism is a 2020 book by Anne Applebaum that discusses democratic decline and the rise of right-wing populist politics with authoritarian tendencies, with three main case studies: Poland, the United Kingdom and the United States. The book also includes discussions of Hungary and Spain.

Appelbaum's analysis focuses in particular on the intellectuals, whom she labels "clercs", who provide the cognitive justifications for a descent into authoritarianism, and on Karen Stenner's concept of "authoritarian predisposition"; an interview with Stenner is incorporated in the book.

== Content ==
Applebaum, an American journalist who lives partly in Poland, opens the book with a 1999 party she held in Poland, attended by center-right proponents of democracy and "free-market liberal[ism]", from which she traces the evolution of the attendees to the modern day. According to Applebaum, over the years some of the attendees came to embrace right-wing populism and authoritarianism (with some even promoting antisemitic conspiracy theories), while others continued to be democrats. She labels the former group clercs, (Note: "Translator's Note" to the English translation of Julien Benda's book while explaining the choice of the English title, The Treason of the Intellectuals, says that the term "clerc" was defined by Benda as "all those who speak to the world in a transcendental manner".) from Julien Benda's book La Trahison des Clercs, and dedicates most of the book to explaining the evolution of these clercs from supporters of democracy to proponents of authoritarianism. She views these clercs as an essential component of the growth of authoritarianism as authoritarians, in her view, require not only mass support but also "the collaboration of people in high places".

Among the key clercs profiled in the book are Rafael Bardají (Spain), Ania Bielecka (Poland), Simon Heffer (United Kingdom), Laura Ingraham (United States), and Mária Schmidt (Hungary). They have, according to Appelbaum, "come to betray the central task of intellectuals, i.e. the search for truth". Instead, their role is "to defend the leaders, however dishonest their statements, however great their corruption, however disastrous their impact on ordinary people and institutions". Contrary to contemporary explanations of authoritarian support—economic distress, fear of terrorism, and the pressures of immigration— she notes that these clercs are highly educated, well travelled, and economically prosperous. According to John Kampfner's collated review, Applebaum places clercs' support for authoritarians instead in career advancement, revenge for slights by other elites, and a sense of "cultural despair" that existing elites have supposedly turned their countries into "dark, nightmarish place[s]". The book continues with the role Margaret Thatcher's "ghostwriter", John O'Sullivan, and the Danube Institute played in connecting Brexit to Hungarian illiberalism. Effective are Applebaum's analyses of nostalgia which she first bases on Svetlana Boym's "elegant book" The Future of Nostalgia (2001):

Radically different from the reflective nostalgics are what Boym calls the restorative nostalgics, not all of whom recognize themselves as nostalgics at all.

Applebaum also analyzes how ordinary people come to support authoritarianism. Here she has been said to blame, as Sheri Berman wrote, Arendt's authoritarian personality found in many people. In particular, in post-Communist Europe, Applebaum finds that many former anti-Communist activists felt let down by the system of meritocracy which did not give them the results they thought they deserved. Applebaum writes that many followers of the right-wing populist parties came to believe in "medium-sized lies", conspiracy theories, and alternate realities. The harsh rhetoric of right-wing populists draws international attention to the rhetoric and away from authoritarian actions and political corruption. According to Applebaum, "soft dictatorships" have been established in Poland by Law and Justice and in Hungary by Fidesz and Viktor Orbán.

[Hannah] Arendt observed the attraction of authoritarianism to people who feel resentful or unsuccessful back in the 1940s, when she wrote that the worst kind of one-party state "invariably replaces all first-rate talents, regardless of their sympathies, with those crackpots and fools whose lack of intelligence and creativity is still the best guarantee of their loyalty."

== Reception ==
In The New York Times, journalist Bill Keller wrote that the book continues the discussion of the fate of democracy carried out in the books The Death of Democracy by Benjamin Carter Hett, about how the political failings in Weimar Germany contributed to the rise of Nazism, How Democracies Die, a political science book by Steven Levitsky and Daniel Ziblatt discussing what went wrong in various recently failed democracies, and Surviving Autocracy, by Russian journalist Masha Gessen on Trumpism. Comparing the book with Applebaum's earlier substantial works, Keller describes it as "a magazine essay expanded into a book that is part rumination, part memoir".

In The Guardian, John Kampfner called the book an "engrossing" political book that is "intensely personal, and the more powerful for it".

Hungarian historian Ferenc Laczó labeled Applebaum "a Dreyfusard from the right" and states that her book lacks self-examination and "curiously fails to address in what ways the political successes and policy failures of Applebaum’s own Thatcherite camp might have enabled the rise of the new rightist political forces". He nevertheless considers the book "urgent" and an "essential read".

In The American Scholar, Charles Trueheart described the book as a "bleak account of the West's slide toward tyranny".
