= Ferenc Laczó =

Hungarian historian

Ferenc Laczó (born 1982 in Budapest) is a historian at Maastricht University.

== Works ==
- Laczó, Ferenc (2016). Hungarian Jews in the Age of Genocide: An Intellectual History, 1929–1948. BRILL. ISBN 978-90-04-32865-5.
- Laczó, Ferenc; Lisjak Gabrijelčič, Luka (2020). The Legacy of Division. East and West after 1989. CEU Press. ISBN 978-963-386-374-9.
- Magyarország Globális Története (1869-2022) ed. Ferenc Laczó and Bálint Varga (2022)
