= Anne Applebaum =

American historian (born 1964)

Anne Applebaum FRSL
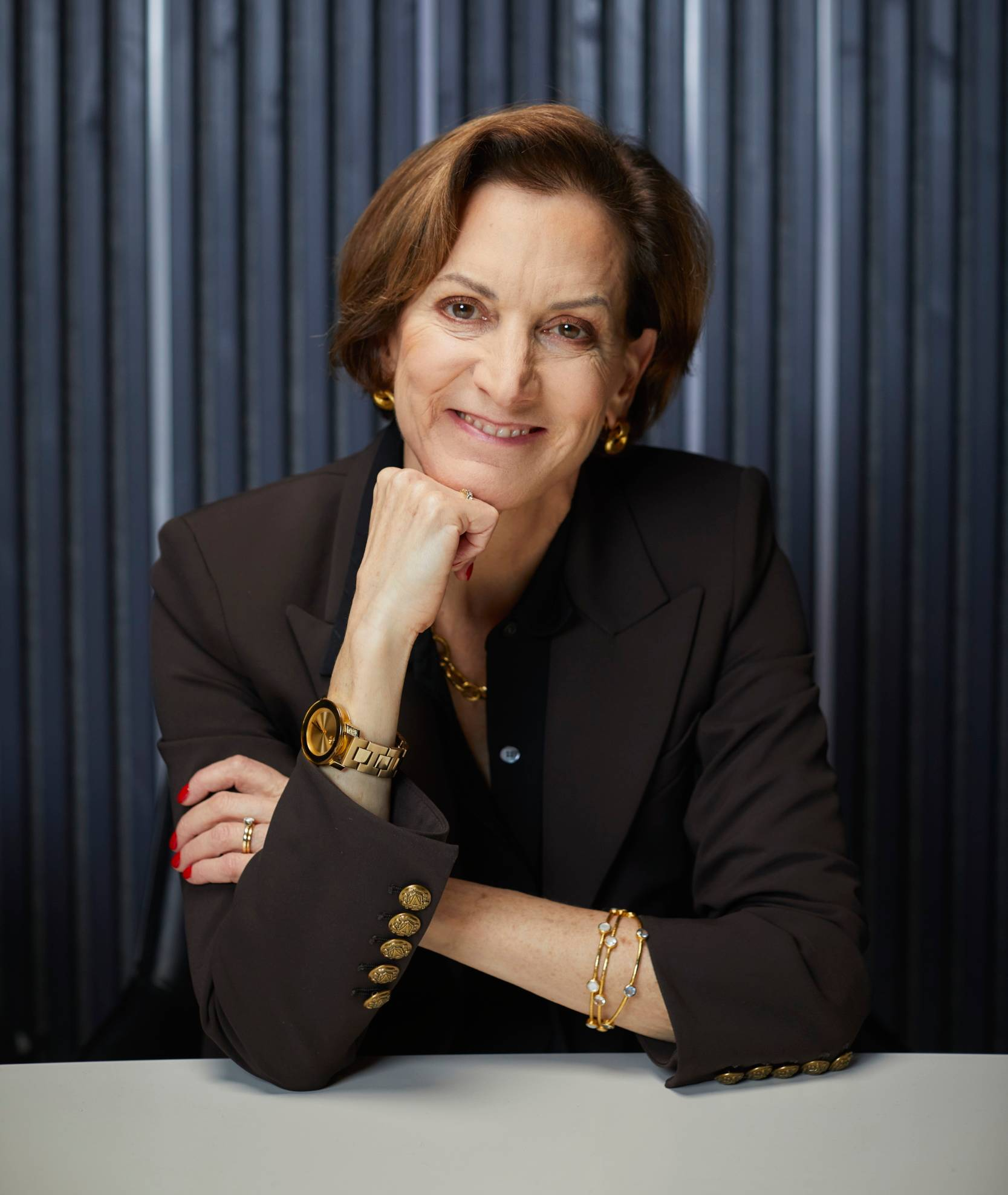
- Applebaum in 2024
- Born: Anne Elizabeth Applebaum; July 25, 1964 (age 62); Washington, D.C., U.S.
- Citizenship: United States; Poland
- Education: Yale University (BA); London School of Economics (MSc); St Antony's College, Oxford
- Known for: Writing on Soviet Union and its satellite countries
- Spouse: Radosław Sikorski (m. 1992)
- Children: 2
- Awards: Pulitzer Prize for General Nonfiction
- Website: www.anneapplebaum.com

Anne Elizabeth Applebaum (born July 25, 1964) is an American journalist, historian and foreign-policy commentator. She has written extensively about the history of Communism and the development of civil society in Central and Eastern Europe. She became a Polish citizen in 2013, and is married to Radosław Sikorski, Poland's deputy prime minister and minister of foreign affairs.

Applebaum has worked for The Economist and The Spectator and was a member of the editorial board of The Washington Post from 2002 to 2006. In 2004, she won the Pulitzer Prize for General Nonfiction for Gulag: A History. She is a staff writer and commentator for The Atlantic and a senior fellow at the SNF Agora Institute and the School of Advanced International Studies at Johns Hopkins University.

Applebaum also publishes the newsletter Open Letters.

== Early life and education ==
Applebaum was born in Washington, D.C., to a Reform Jewish family, the eldest of three daughters of Harvey M. and Elizabeth Applebaum. Her father, a Yale alumnus, was senior counsel in the antitrust and international trade practices at Covington & Burling. Her mother was a program coordinator at the Corcoran Gallery of Art. According to Applebaum, her great-grandparents immigrated to North America during the reign of Alexander III of Russia from what is now Belarus.

After attending Sidwell Friends School in Washington, D.C., Applebaum entered Yale University; there she studied Soviet history under Wolfgang Leonhard during the fall semester of 1982. While an undergraduate, she spent the summer of 1985 in Leningrad, Soviet Union (now Saint Petersburg, Russia), an experience she says helped shape her opinions.

Applebaum received her B.A. from Yale in 1986 in history and literature. She received a two-year Marshall Scholarship at the London School of Economics, where she earned a master's degree in international relations (1987). She also studied at St Antony's College, Oxford, before becoming a correspondent for The Economist and moving to Warsaw, Poland, in 1988.

In November 1989, Applebaum drove from Warsaw to Berlin to report on the collapse of the Berlin Wall.

== Career ==
As foreign correspondent for The Economist and The Independent, she covered the fall of the Berlin Wall and the fall of communism. In 1991 she returned to England to work for The Economist; she was later hired as the foreign editor and subsequently deputy editor of The Spectator, and later the political editor of the Evening Standard. In 1994, she published her first book, Between East and West: Across the Borderlands of Europe, a travelogue that described the rise of nationalism across the new states of the former Soviet Union. In 2001, she interviewed prime minister Tony Blair. She also undertook historical research for her book Gulag: A History (2003), about the Soviet prison camp system, which won the 2004 Pulitzer Prize for General Nonfiction. It was also nominated for a National Book Award, the Los Angeles Times book award, and the National Book Critics Circle Award.

External videos
- Booknotes interview with Applebaum on Gulag, May 25, 2003, C-SPAN
- Q&A interview with Applebaum on Iron Curtain, December 16, 2012, C-SPAN

Applebaum has been a member of the editorial board of The Washington Post, and was a columnist for the newspaper for 17 years. In addition, she was an adjunct fellow at the American Enterprise Institute, a conservative think tank.

Her second history book, Iron Curtain: The Crushing of Eastern Europe 1944–56, was published in 2012 by Doubleday (in the US) and Allen Lane (in the UK); it was nominated for a National Book Award and shortlisted for the 2013 PEN/John Kenneth Galbraith Award. From 2011 to 2016, she created and ran the Transitions Forum at the Legatum Institute, an international think tank and educational charity based in London. Among other projects, she ran a two-year program examining the relationship between democracy and growth in Brazil, India, and South Africa; created the Future of Syria and Future of Iran projects on institutional change in those countries; and commissioned a series of papers on corruption in Georgia, Moldova, and Ukraine.

With Foreign Policy magazine she created Democracy Lab, a website focusing on countries moving toward or away from democracy; this later became Democracy Post at The Washington Post. In 2016, she left Legatum because of its stance on Brexit after the Euroskeptic Philippa Stroud was appointed CEO; Applebaum then joined the London School of Economics (LSE) as a professor of practice at the Institute for Global Affairs. At the LSE, she ran Arena, a program on disinformation and 21st-century propaganda. In 2019, she moved the program to the SNF Agora Institute at Johns Hopkins University.

In 2017, she published her third history book, Red Famine: Stalin's War on Ukraine, a history of the Holodomor (the 1932–33 human-made famine in Soviet Ukraine). The book won the Lionel Gelber Prize and the Duff Cooper Prize, making her the only author to win the Duff Cooper Prize twice.

In November 2019, The Atlantic announced that Applebaum would join the publication as a staff writer starting in January 2020. She was included in Prospect magazine's 2020 list of the top 50 thinkers for the COVID-19 era.

External videos
- Presentation by Applebaum on Twilight of Democracy, July 21, 2020, C-SPAN

In July 2020, her book Twilight of Democracy: The Seductive Lure of Authoritarianism was published. Partly a memoir and partly political analysis, it was on the bestseller lists of Der Spiegel magazine and The New York Times. Also in July 2020, Applebaum was one of 153 signers of the "Harper's Letter" (also known as "A Letter on Justice and Open Debate"); this expressed concern that "the free exchange of information and ideas, the lifeblood of a liberal society, is daily becoming more constricted."

In November 2022, Applebaum was one of 200 US citizens sanctioned by Russia for "promotion of the Russophobic campaign and support for the regime in Kiev."

Applebaum is a member of the Council on Foreign Relations. She is on the boards of the National Endowment for Democracy and Renew Democracy Initiative. She is also on the editorial boards of The American Interest magazine and the Journal of Democracy. She was a member of the international board of directors of the Institute for War and Peace Reporting. In addition, she was a Senior Adjunct Fellow at the Center for European Policy Analysis (CEPA), where she co-led a major initiative aimed at countering Russian disinformation in Central and Eastern Europe (CEE).

== Positions ==
=== Soviet Union and Russia ===
According to Sheila Fitzpatrick, "Applebaum has been active as a political commentator highly critical of Russia and Putin's regime." Ivan Krastev wrote that the 1989 fall of the Berlin Wall "was the point of departure of everything that Applebaum did in the following three decades...For her, the end of the Cold War was not a geopolitical story; it was a moral story, a verdict pronounced by history itself."

In 2000, Applebaum described the links between the then-new president of Russia, Vladimir Putin; the former Soviet leader Yuri Andropov; and the former KGB agency. In 2008, she began speaking about Putinism as an anti-democratic ideology. However, most people at the time still considered Putin a pro-Western pragmatist.

Applebaum has been a vocal critic of Western conduct toward the Russian military intervention in Ukraine. In an article in The Washington Post on March 5, 2014, she maintained that the US and its allies should not continue to enable "the existence of a corrupt Russian regime that is destabilizing Europe", writing that Putin's actions had violated "a series of international treaties". On March 7 in another article, in The Daily Telegraph, discussing an information war, Applebaum argued that "a robust campaign to tell the truth about Crimea is needed to counter Moscow's lies". At the end of August, she asked whether Ukraine should prepare for "total war" with Russia and whether central Europeans should join them. Critics of Applebaum's, including journalist Glenn Greenwald, have called her a "warmonger" and a "neocon". On June 24, 2023, Applebaum claimed that "Russia is sliding into what can only be described as a civil war" in the midst of the Wagner insurrection, comparing Vladimir Putin to Czar Nicholas II and suggesting by implication that Russia faced imminent dissolution and collapse. Russian forces defeated the Wagner coup in several days, before capturing an additional 9,400 square kilometers of land in the Donbas region of Ukraine between 2023-2026.

In 2014, she wrote a review of Karen Dawisha's book Putin's Kleptocracy for The New York Review of Books; in it, she asked whether "the most important story of the past twenty years might not, in fact, have been the failure of democracy, but the rise of a new form of Russian authoritarianism". She has described the "myth of Russian humiliation" and argued that NATO and EU expansion have been a "phenomenal success". In July 2016, before the US election, she wrote about connections between Donald Trump and Russia; she wrote that Russian support for Trump was part of a wider Russian political campaign designed to destabilize the West. In December 2019, she wrote in The Atlantic, "in the 21st century, we must also contend with a new phenomenon: right-wing intellectuals, now deeply critical of their own societies, who have begun paying court to right-wing dictators who dislike America."

=== Press freedom ===
Applebaum's article in The Washington Post on October 14, 2018, "This Is Why So Many Journalists Are At Risk Today" highlighted attacks on press freedom by "authoritarian and autocratic regimes".

In a Slate article titled "Kill the Messenger: Why Palestine radio and TV studios are fair targets in the Palestine/Israeli war", Applebaum justified the bombing of the official Palestinian media and said that it was "a combatant—and therefore a legitimate target—in a painful, never-ending, low-intensity war". However, in a 2024 interview, she denied that "radio stations or television stations are actually legitimate military targets".

=== Central Europe ===
Applebaum has written about the history of central and eastern Europe, Poland in particular. In the conclusion to her book Iron Curtain, she argues that the reconstruction of civil society was the most important and most difficult challenge for the post-communist states of central Europe; in another essay, she argued that the modern authoritarian obsession with civil society repression dates to Vladimir Lenin. She has written essays on the Polish filmmaker Andrzej Wajda; the dual Nazi–Soviet occupation of central Europe; and why it is inaccurate to define Eastern Europe as a single entity.

=== Disinformation, propaganda, and fake news ===
Applebaum wrote about a 2014 Russian smear campaign against her while she was writing heavily about the Russian annexation of Crimea. She said that dubious online material was eventually recycled by semi-respectable American pro-Russia websites. Applebaum argued in 2015 that Facebook should take responsibility for spreading false stories and help "undo the terrible damage done by Facebook and other forms of social media to democratic debate and civilized discussion all over the world". Applebaum has been a member of the advisory panel for the organization Global Disinformation Index.

=== Nationalism ===
In March 2016, during the 2016 US election campaign, Applebaum wrote a column for The Washington Post asking, "Is this the end of the West as we know it?"; the column argued that "we are two or three bad elections away from the end of NATO, the end of the European Union and maybe the end of the liberal world order". Applebaum endorsed Hillary Clinton for president in July 2016, because she views Trump as "a man who appears bent on destroying the alliances that preserve international peace and American power".

Applebaum wrote a Washington Post column in March 2016 that led the Swiss newspaper Tages-Anzeiger and the German magazine Der Spiegel to interview her. These articles appeared in December 2016 and January 2017. She wrote that the international populist movement frequently called "far right" or "alt-right" is not conservative as this term has traditionally been defined. She wrote that populist groups in Europe share "ideas and ideology, friends and founders"; unlike Burkean conservatives, they seek to "overthrow the institutions of the present to bring back things that existed in the past—or that they believe existed in the past—by force." Applebaum has underlined the danger of a new "Nationalist International", a union of xenophobic, nationalist parties such as Law and Justice in Poland, the Northern League in Italy, and the Freedom Party in Austria.

In January 2022, Applebaum was invited to testify before the Foreign Affairs Committee of the U.S. House of Representatives; the committee hearing was entitled "Bolstering Democracy in the Age of Rising Authoritarianism".

== Personal life ==
In 1992, Applebaum married Radosław Sikorski, who was later Poland's Minister of National Defence, Minister of Foreign Affairs, Marshal of the Sejm, and a member of the European Parliament. Since December 2023 Sikorski has served as the Minister of Foreign Affairs in Donald Tusk's Third Cabinet. The couple has two sons. Applebaum gained Polish citizenship in 2013; she speaks Polish and Russian in addition to English.

In July 2025, Applebaum delivered the opening address at the Salzburg Festival.

== Awards and honors ==
- 1992 Charles Douglas-Home Memorial Trust Award
- 2003 National Book Award Nonfiction, finalist, for Gulag: A History
- 2003 Duff Cooper Prize for Gulag: A History
- 2004 Pulitzer Prize (General Nonfiction) for Gulag: A History
- 2008 Estonian Order of the Cross of Terra Mariana third class
- 2008 Lithuanian Millennium Star
- 2010 Petőfi Prize
- 2012 Officer's Cross of the Order of Merit of the Republic of Poland
- 2012 National Book Award (Nonfiction), finalist, for Iron Curtain: The Crushing of Eastern Europe 1944–1956
- 2013 Cundill Prize in Historical Literature for Iron Curtain: The Crushing of Eastern Europe 1944–1956
- 2013 Duke of Westminster's Medal for Military Literature for Iron Curtain: The Crushing of Eastern Europe 1944–1956
- 2017 Doctor of Humane Letters Honoris Causa, Georgetown University
- 2017 Honorary Doctorate, National University of Kyiv-Mohyla Academy
- 2017 Duff Cooper Prize for Red Famine: Stalin's War on Ukraine
- 2017 Antonovych Prize
- 2018 Lionel Gelber Prize for Red Famine: Stalin's War on Ukraine
- 2018 Honorary Fritz Stern Professor, University of Wrocław
- 2019 Premio Nonino "Maestro del nostro tempo" ("Master of our Time")
- 2019 Order of Princess Olga, third class
- 2021 National Magazine Awards finalist in categories "Essays and Criticism" and "Columns and Commentary"
- 2021 Premio Internacional de Periodismo de EL MUNDO
- 2021 Elected Fellow of the Royal Society of Literature
- 2022 Order of Princess Olga, second class
- 2024 Friedenspreis des Deutschen Buchhandels

== Selected publications ==
- Between East and West: Across the Borderlands of Europe, Pantheon, (1994), reprinted by Random House, 1995; Penguin, 2015; and Anchor, 2017, ISBN 0679421505
- Gulag: A History, Doubleday, (2003), 677 pages, ISBN 0-7679-0056-1; paperback, Bantam Dell, 2004, 736 pages, ISBN 1-4000-3409-4
- Gulag Voices : An Anthology, Yale University Press, (2011), 224 pages, ISBN 9780300177831; hardback
- Iron Curtain: The Crushing of Eastern Europe, 1944–1956, Allen Lane, (2012), 614 pages, ISBN 978-0-713-99868-9 / Doubleday ISBN 978-0-385-51569-6
- From a Polish Country House Kitchen with Danielle Crittenden, Chronicle Books, (2012), 288 pages, ISBN 1-452-11055-7; hardback
- Red Famine: Stalin's War on Ukraine, Penguin Randomhouse, (2017)
- Twilight of Democracy: The Seductive Lure of Authoritarianism, Doubleday, (2020), 224 pages, ISBN 978-0385545808; hardback
- Wybór (Choice), Agora, (2021), 320 pages, ISBN 978-8326838255; hardback
- Autocracy, Inc.: The Dictators Who Want to Run the World, Doubleday, (2024), 224 pages, ISBN 978-0385549936; hardback
