= Dark Continent =

Dark Continent may refer to:

- An outdated phrase to describe Africa, particularly Sub-Saharan Africa
- A phrase used in 1926 by Sigmund Freud to describe the sexual life of adult women
- Busch Gardens: The Dark Continent, a former name of Busch Gardens Tampa Bay
- Dark Continent (album), an album by Wall of Voodoo
- Dark Continent: Adventure & Exploration in Darkest Africa, a role-playing game published in 2000 by New Breed; see Timeline of tabletop role-playing games
- Dark Continent: Europe's Twentieth Century, a book on 20th-century European history by Mark Mazower
- Monsters: Dark Continent, British independent science fiction monster film
- The Jewish Dark Continent, a book about the Jewish Ethnographic Expedition
