= Verdon Gorge =

Canyon in Southeastern France

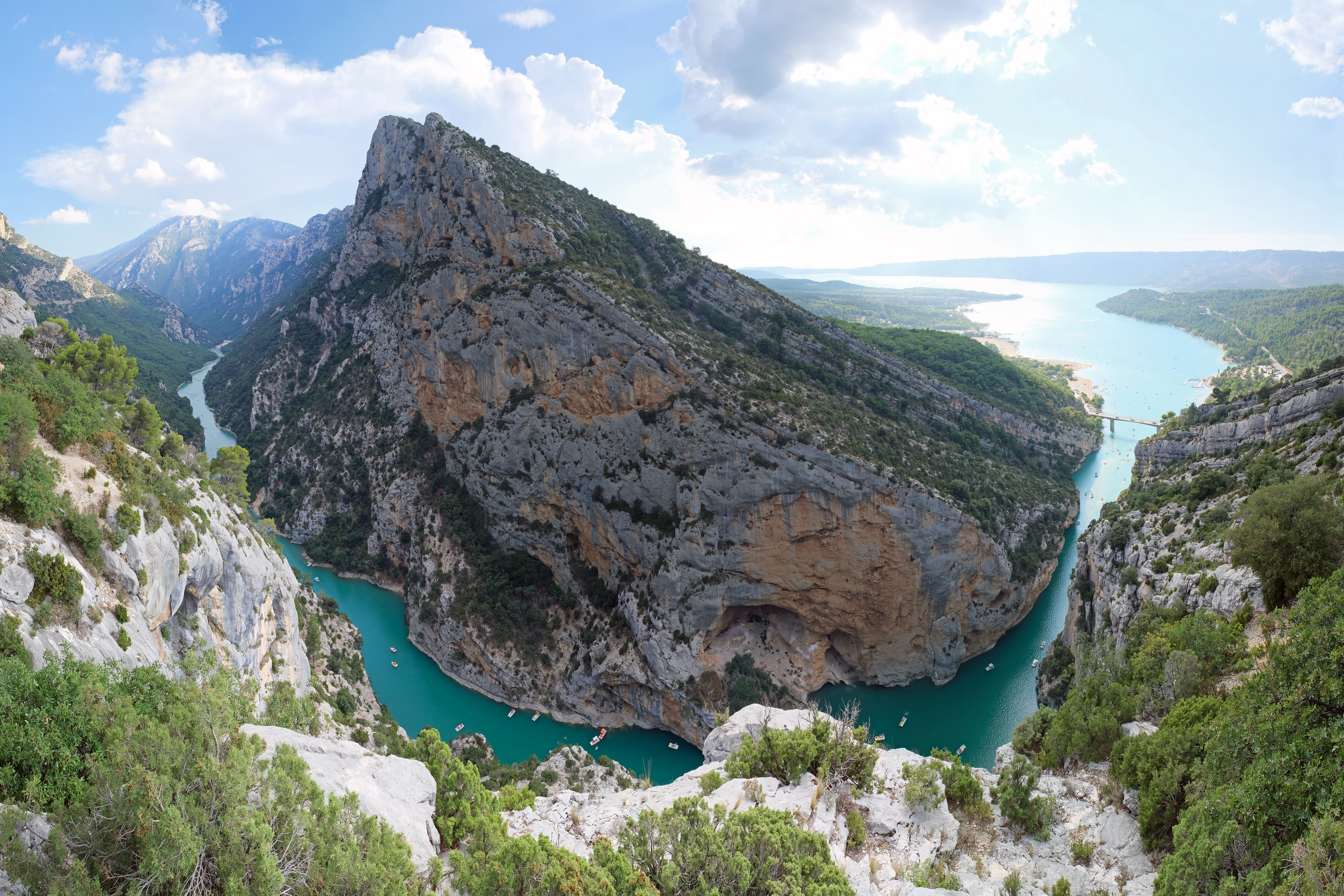
- Verdon Gorge and Lake of Sainte-Croix

Naming
- Native name: Gorges du Verdon (French)

Geography
- Location: Alpes-de-Haute-Provence and Var, France
- Coordinates: 43°44′16″N 6°21′50″E
- Interactive map of Verdon Gorge

The Verdon Gorge (French: Gorges du Verdon; Occitan: Gòrja de Verdon) is a river canyon located in the Provence-Alpes-Côte d'Azur region of Southeastern France. It is about 25 km (15.5 mi) long and up to 700 metres (0.4 mi) deep. It was formed by the Verdon River, which is named for its turquoise-green colour, one of the location's distinguishing characteristics. In between the towns of Castellane and Moustiers-Sainte-Marie, the river has cut a ravine to a depth of 700 meters through the limestone mass. At the end of the canyon, the Verdon flows into the artificial Lake of Sainte-Croix.

The gorge is very popular with tourists, who can drive around its rim, rent kayaks to travel on the river, or hike. The limestone walls, which are several hundreds of metres high, attract many rock climbers. It is considered an outstanding destination for multi-pitch climbing, with 1,500 routes available ranging from 20 metres (65 feet) to over 400 metres (1,300 feet).

== History ==
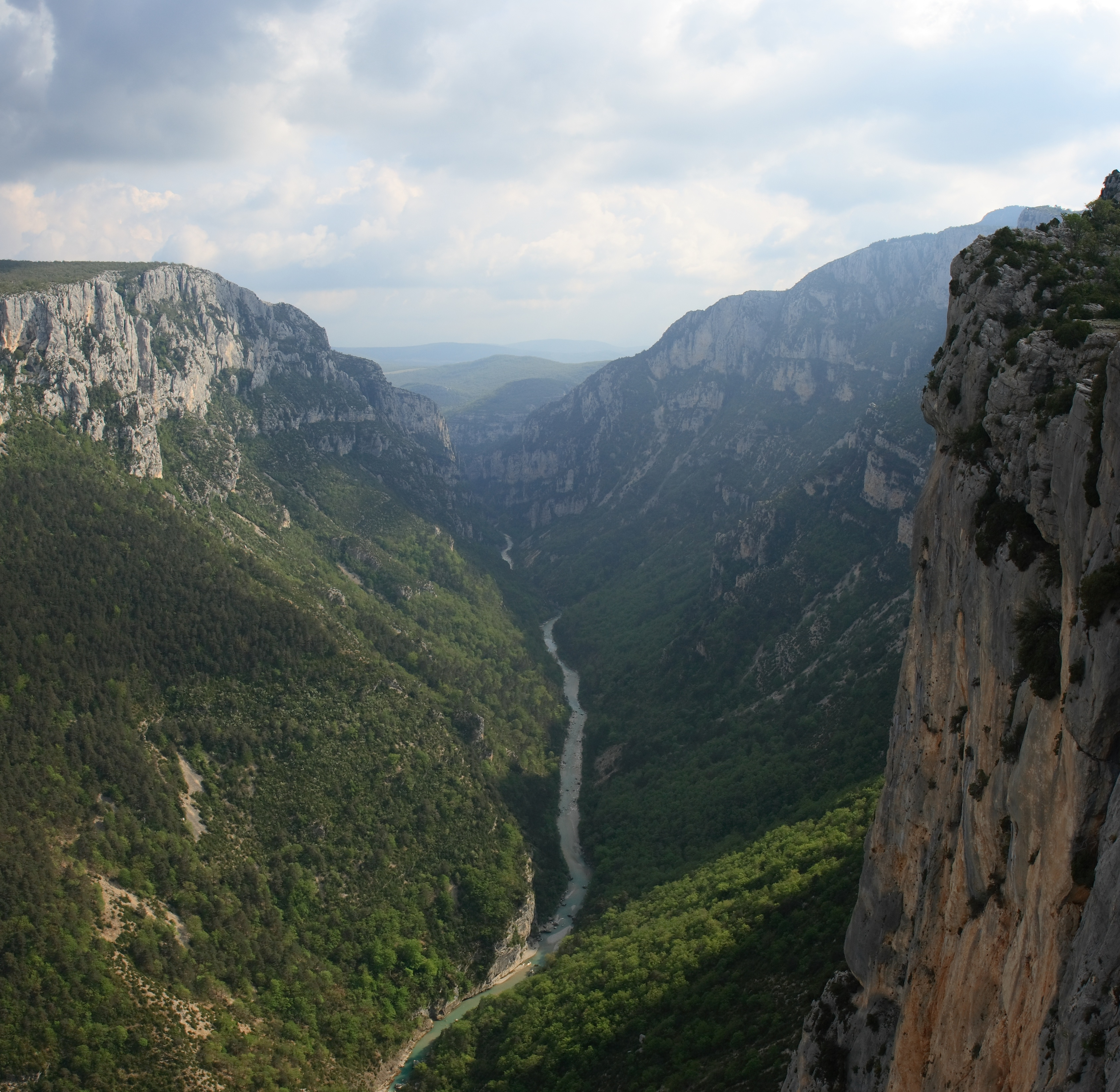
The Verdon Gorge seen from the Trescaïre viewpoint

During the Triassic period, the Provence subsided and was covered by the sea, leaving thick layers of various limestone deposits. Several million years later, with the arrival of the Jurassic period, the area was covered by a warm shallow sea, which allowed the growth of various corals. The Cretaceous period saw what is now Basse Provence being raised and the sea reaching the current location of the Alps, which were themselves erected during the tertiary era. As a result of the large-scale geological activity, many of the Jurassic limestone deposits fractured, forming relief with valleys and other such features. The origins of the Verdon Gorge can be traced to this era.

The dawn of the Quaternary period had large-scale glaciation, transforming water pockets and lakes into rivers of ice, which remodeled the topography, scouring and striating the landscape. At the end of this activity, erosion by rivers continued, forming the Gorge as it is today. The Verdon's riverbed was scoured for a second time of the accumulated coral and limestone sediments, by a water delivery rate nearing 2000 to 3000 cubic metres per second.

=== Discovery ===
The gorge was described in printed form from 1782 and 1804. By the second half of the 19th century, it was featured in French tourist guides. According to Graham Robb's book The Discovery of France, the gorge did not become known outside France until 1906.

=== Recent developments ===
On 10 July 2006, the Council of State annulled the declaration of public use of a project by EDF relating to a proposed high-voltage line which would have had to pass through the Verdon Gorge. This decision ended 23 years of struggle by public groups and associations of environmental defence to preserve a site of exceptional natural interest, of which a part contains protected animal and plant species.

During the 2022 European drought, the water levels in the river were very low and dried up completely in some parts.

== Geography ==
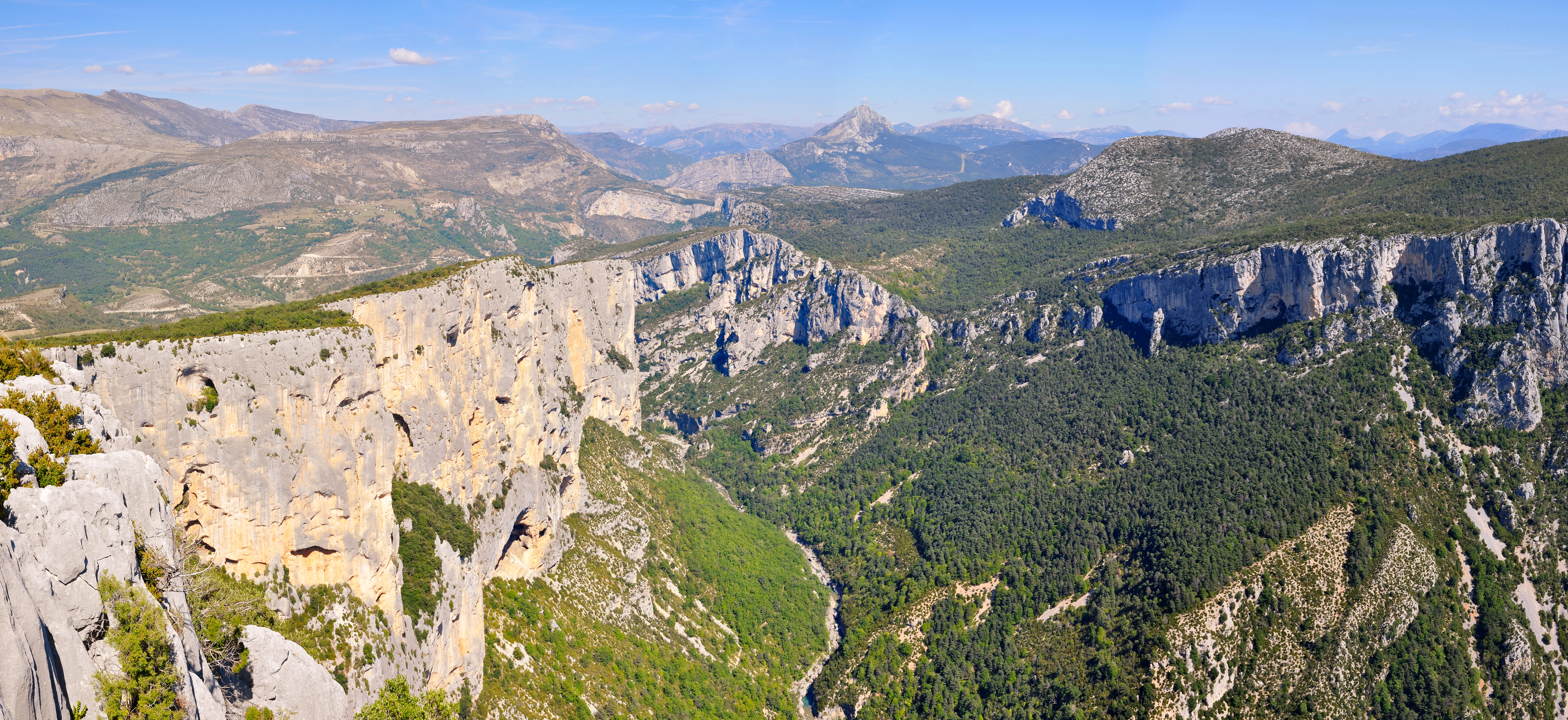
A view of the Verdon Gorge from the Falaise de l'Escalès

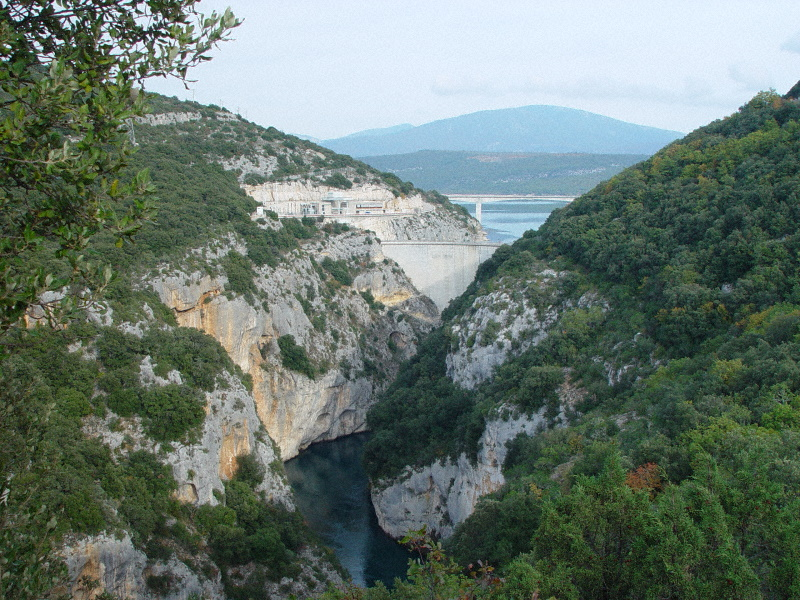
Dam of Sainte-Croix, seen from the Low-Gorges of Baudinard

The source of the Verdon is close to the col d'Allos hill in the Trois Eveches mountain range, whence it continues, flowing into the Durance river near Vinon-sur-Verdon after traveling 175 kilometres. Between Castellane and the Galetas bridge, the river passes through the lake of Sainte-Croix, created by the construction of a dam of the same name. Before the dam was constructed, the village of Les Salles-sur-Verdon occupied the river plain. To create the reservoir, the village was destroyed in 1973. Les Salles-sur-Verdon was reconstructed as a more modern settlement higher up the valley. Today, it is the youngest village in France.

For some distance the Verdon Gorge forms the border between the départements of Var to the south and Alpes-de-Haute-Provence to the north in the Provence-Alpes-Côte d'Azur région.

This region between Castellane and the Lac de Sainte-Croix is called the Gorges du Verdon, or Verdon Gorge. It is split into three distinct parts:

- "Prégorges" ('pre-gorge'), from Castellane to Pont de Soleils,
- the deepest part of the Gorge, from Pont de Soleils to l'Imbut, and
- the Canyon from l’Imbut to the Pont du Galetas.

The Verdon Gorge is narrow and deep, with depths of 250 to 700 metres and widths of 6 to 100 metres at the level of the Verdon river. It is 200 to 1500 metres wide from one side of the Gorge to the other at the summits. The Gorge has been compared to the Grand Canyon in the United States.

== Hydro-electric dams ==
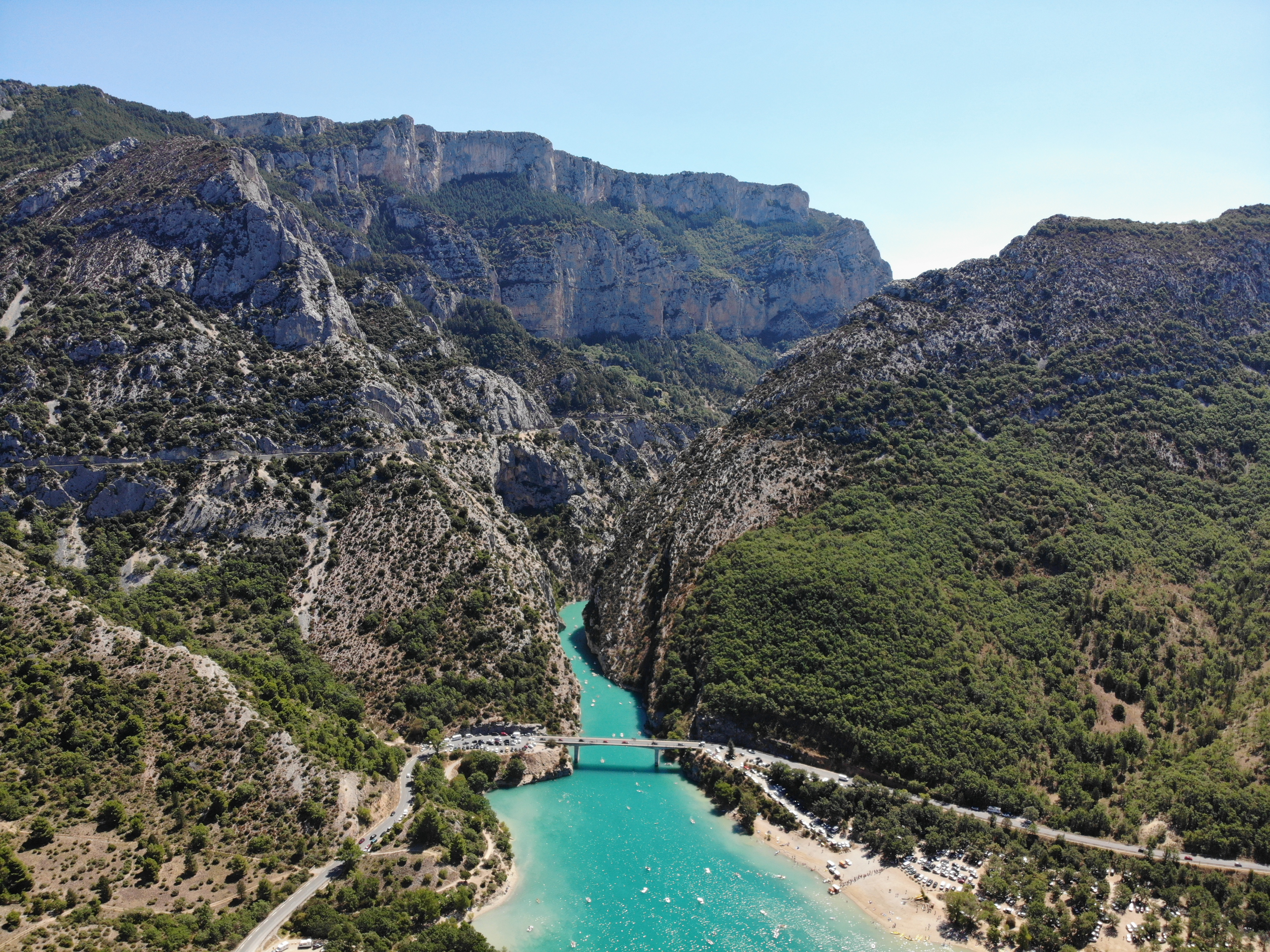
View of the entrance to the Verdon Gorge with the Lake of Sainte-Croix in the foreground.

Between 1929 and 1975, five dams were erected on the course of the Verdon, between Castellane and Gréoux-les-Bains. These dams hold back water in the following reservoirs:

- Lac de Castillon, which was created by flooding the village of the same name
- Lac de Sainte-Croix, flooded the village of des Salles-sur-Verdon
- Lac d'Esparron-Gréoux, known locally as "lac d’Esparron"
- Reservoir at Chaudanne
- Reservoir at Quinson, sometimes improperly called the "lac de Montpezat", the name of the village over which it dominates

== Notable features ==
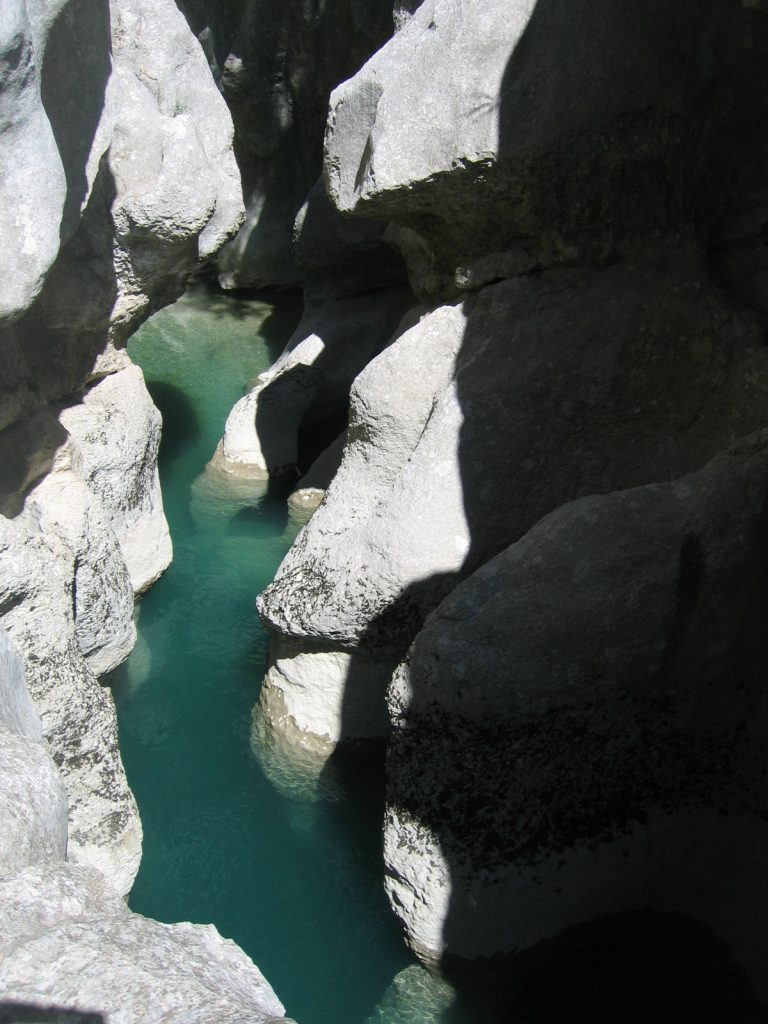
The Styx du Verdon

The Styx du Verdon, associated with the river Styx of Greek mythology, is an area of sub-canyon within the gorge.

The Imbut, also known as Embut or Embucq, is an area where the Verdon disappears underground, beneath enormous rock structures, before re-emerging above ground.

== Tourism ==
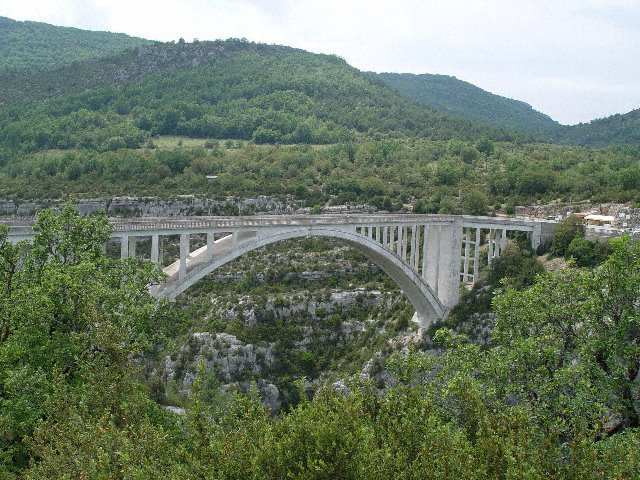
The Pont de Chaulière over the river Artuby

The Verdon Gorge attracts numerous tourists, especially during the summer period. The river's turquoise colour is associated with glacial sources and the minerals of rock flour suspended in the water.

It is easily accessible on its right bank from the north (via route D952 from Castellane to Moustiers-Sainte-Marie), and on its left bank from the south (via routes D71, D90 and D955 from Aiguines to Castellane).

== Sport ==
- The Verdon Gorge attracts many rock climbers for its more than 1,500 climbing routes on good limestone rock
- The Verdon and its Gorge are also a favoured destination for fishermen, particularly for fly fishing.
- Hiking, canoeing, paragliding, rafting, climbing and canyoning are some of the sports practised in the region.

== Hiking and scenic walks ==
The most common hikes in the gorge include:

- Le sentier (pathway) de Martel
- Le sentier de l'Imbut
- Le sentier du Bastidon
- Le belvédère de Rancoumas par le pont de Tusset (the Rancoumas panoramic viewpoint near the Tusset Bridge)

The Sentier Martel, was laid out in 1928 by the Touring Club de France. It was named in 1930 to honor the explorer Édouard-Alfred Martel (1859–1938). Martel had visited the Verdon in 1905 as an employee of the Southeast Electricity Company, carrying out precise geological surveys of the river. On 11 August, he and his team (explorer Armand Janet, schoolmaster Isidore Blanc, geographer Cuvelier, plaus Baptistin Flory, Fernand Honorat, Prosper Marcel, and Tessier Zurcher) began an expedition of the region. Their successful arrival at the Pas de Galetas marked the completion of the first expedition of the Verdon Canyon.

Other expeditions to the Verdon included Martel's team the following year; followed by Robert de Joly, who in 1928 was the first to completely cross the Verdon Gorge.

== Gallery ==
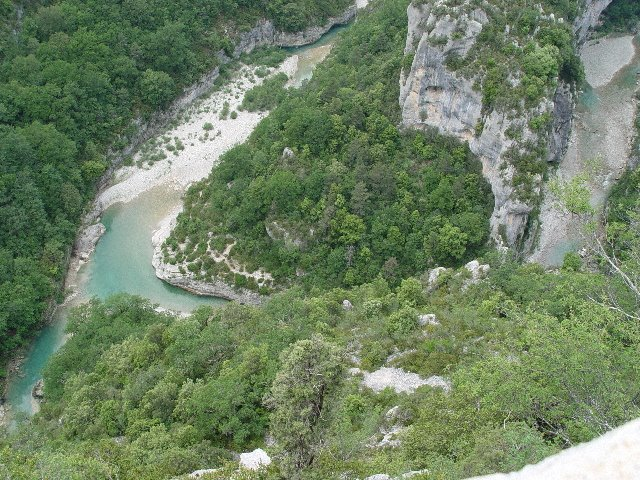
The Artuby mixes with the Verdon, at the Mescla

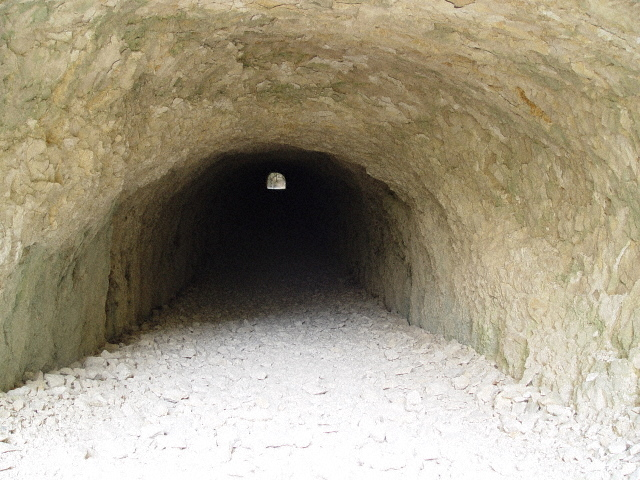
Entrance of Tunnel de Trescaire

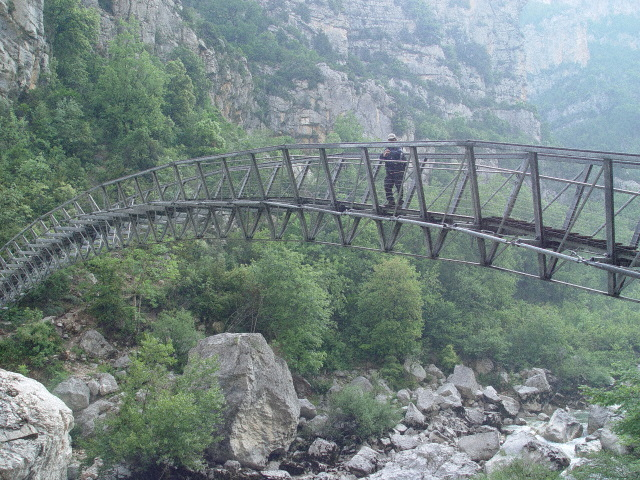
The new footbridge at L'Estellé

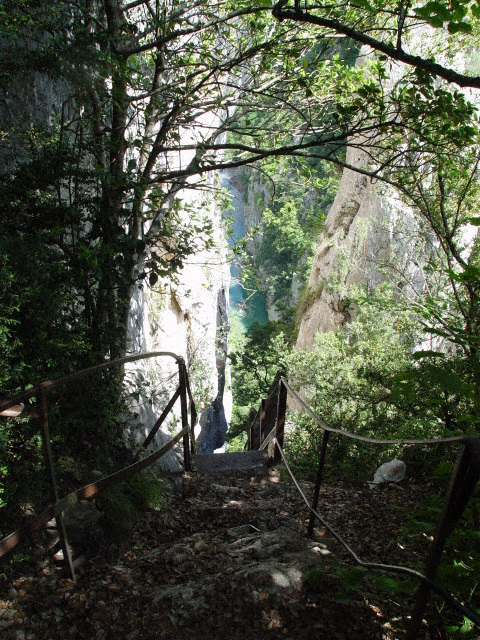
The Échelles Imbert, six stairways and 252 steps

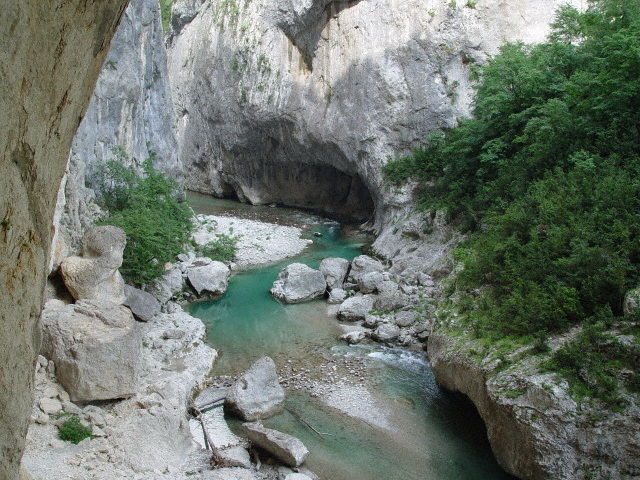
The Baume-aux-Pigeons
