= Duff Cooper Prize =

Literary prize

The Duff Cooper Prize (currently known as the Pol Roger Duff Cooper Prize) is a literary prize awarded annually for the best work of history, biography, political science or occasionally poetry, published in English or French. The prize was established in honour of Duff Cooper, a British diplomat, Cabinet member and author. The prize was first awarded in 1956 to Alan Moorehead for his Gallipoli. At present, the winner receives a first edition copy of Duff Cooper's autobiography Old Men Forget and a cheque for £5,000.

== Overview ==
After Duff Cooper's death in 1954, a group of his friends decided to establish a trust to endow a literary prize in his memory. The trust appoints five judges. Two of them are ex officio: the Warden of New College, Oxford, and a member of Duff Cooper's family (initially, Duff Cooper's son, John Julius Norwich for the first thirty-six years, and then John Julius' daughter, Artemis Cooper). The other three judges appointed by the trust serve for five years and they appoint their own successors. The first three judges were Maurice Bowra, Cyril Connolly and Raymond Mortimer. At present, the three appointed judges are biographer Mark Amory, historian Susan Brigden, and TLS history editor David Horspool.

From 2013, the prize has been known as The Pol Roger Duff Cooper Prize, following a sponsorship by Pol Roger.

== Winners ==
Duff Cooper Prize winners
Year	Author	Title	Ref.
1956	Alan Moorehead	Gallipoli	
1957	Lawrence Durrell	Bitter Lemons	
1958	John Betjeman	Collected Poems	
1959	Patrick Leigh Fermor	Mani: Travels in the Southern Peloponnese	
1960	Andrew Young	Collected Poems	
1961	Jocelyn Baines	Joseph Conrad	
1962	Michael Howard	The Franco-Prussian War	
1963	Aileen Ward	John Keats: The Making of a Poet	
1964	Ivan Morris	The World of the Shining Prince	
1965	George Painter	Marcel Proust	
1966	Nirad C. Chaudhuri	The Continent of Circe	
1967	J. A. Baker	The Peregrine	
1968	Roy Fuller	New Poems	
1969	John Gross	The Man of Letters	
1970	Enid McLeod	Charles of Orleans: Prince & Poet	
1971	Geoffrey Grigson	Discoveries of Bones and Stones	
1972	Quentin Bell	Virginia Woolf	
1973	Robin Lane Fox	Alexander the Great	
1974	Jon Stallworthy	Wilfred Owen	
1975	Seamus Heaney	North	
1976	Denis Mack Smith	Mussolini's Roman Empire	
1977	E. R. Dodds	Missing Persons	
1978	Mark Girouard	Life in the English Country House	
1979	Geoffrey Hill	Tenebrae	
1980	Robert Bernard Martin	Tennyson, The Unquiet Heart	
1981	Victoria Glendinning	Edith Sitwell: A Unicorn Among the Lions	
1982	Richard Ellmann	James Joyce	
1983	Peter Porter	Collected Poems	
1984	Hilary Spurling	Ivy When Young: The Early Life of Ivy Compton-Burnett 1884-1919	
1985	Ann Thwaite	Edmund Gosse: A Literary Landscape, 1849-1928	
1986	Alan Crawford	C. R. Ashbee: Architect, Designer, and Romantic Socialist	
1987	Robert Hughes	The Fatal Shore	
1988	Humphrey Carpenter	A Serious Character: The Life of Ezra Pound	
1989	Ian Gibson	Federico Garcia Lorca	
1990	Hugh Cecil and Mirabel Cecil	Clever Hearts: Desmond and Molly Maccarthy: A Biography	
1991	Ray Monk	Ludwig Wittgenstein: The Duty of Genius	
1992	Peter Hennessy	Never Again: Britain, 1945-1951	
1993	John Keegan	A History of Warfare	
1994	David Gilmour	Curzon: Imperial Statesman	
1995	Gitta Sereny	Albert Speer: His Battle with Truth	
1996	Diarmaid MacCulloch	Thomas Cranmer: A Life	
1997	James Buchan	Frozen Desire: An Inquiry into the Meaning of Money	
1998	Richard Holmes	Coleridge: Darker Reflections	
1999	Adam Hochschild	King Leopold's Ghost: A Story of Greed, Terror and Heroism in Colonial Africa	
2000	Robert Skidelsky	John Maynard Keynes	
2001	Margaret MacMillan	Peacemakers: The Paris Peace Conference of 1919 and Its Attempt to End War	
2002	Jane Ridley	The Architect and His Wife	
2003	Anne Applebaum	Gulag: A History	
2004	Mark Mazower	Salonica, City of Ghosts: Christians, Muslims and Jews, 1430-1950	
2005	Maya Jasanoff	Edge of Empire: Conquest and Collecting on the Eastern Frontiers of the British Empire	
2006	William Dalrymple	The Last Mughal: The Fall of a Dynasty, Delhi 1857	
2007	Graham Robb	The Discovery of France	
2008	Kai Bird and Martin J. Sherwin	American Prometheus: The Triumph and Tragedy of J. Robert Oppenheimer	
2009	Robert Service	Trotsky: A Biography	
2010	Sarah Bakewell	How to Live: A Life of Montaigne in One Question and Twenty Attempts at An Answer	
2011	Robert Douglas-Fairhurst	Becoming Dickens: The Invention of a Novelist	
2012	Sue Prideaux	Strindberg: A Life	
2013	Lucy Hughes-Hallett	The Pike: Gabriele D'Annunzio, Poet, Seducer and Preacher of War	
2014	Patrick McGuinness	Other People's Countries: A Journey into Memory	
2015	Ian Bostridge	Schubert's Winter Journey: Anatomy of an Obsession	
2016	Christopher de Hamel	Meetings with Remarkable Manuscripts	
2017	Anne Applebaum	Red Famine: Stalin's War on Ukraine	
2018	Julian Jackson	A Certain Idea of France: The Life of Charles De Gaulle	
2019	John Barton	A History of the Bible	
2020	Judith Herrin	Ravenna: Capital of Empire, Crucible of Empire	
2021	Mark Mazower	The Greek Revolution: 1821 and the Making of Modern Europe	
2022	Anna Keay	The Restless Republic: Britain without a Crown	
2023	Julian Jackson	France on Trial: The Case of Marshal Pétain	
2024	Sue Prideaux	Wild Thing: A Life of Paul Gauguin	
2025	Tim Bouverie	Allies at War: The Politics of Defeating Hitler	

== See also ==
- List of history awards
- Prizes named after people
