= Battle of Meritsa =

WWII battle in Greece

- Part of Greek resistance in World War II
Location	Modern day Oxyneia
Result	ELAS victory

Belligerents
Greek People's Liberation Army	Royal Italian Army

Commanders and leaders
Nestoras Vokas; Ilias Kafantaris; Nikos Zaralis; Aristidis Bloutsos	Unknown

Strength
800 men	One battalion (700–900 men)

Casualties and losses
7 casualties	137 men killed 160 men taken as prisoners but later released

The Battle of Meritsa (Greek: Μάχη της Μερίτσας) or Battle of Oxyneia (Μάχη της Οξύνειας) was fought from 11–12 February 1943, between 800 men of the Greek People's Liberation Army (ELAS), under Nestoras Vokas (nom de guerre "Tzavellas"), Nikos Zaralis ("Chasiotis"), Ilias Kafantaris ("Adamantios") and artillery 2nd Lieutenant Aristidis Bloutsos (MIDAS) against a Royal Italian Army battalion.

The Battle of Meritsa was the first victorious battle of the Greek National Resistance and had tremendous impact on Greek morale.

It was fought at the village of Meritsa (modern Oxyneia) near Kalambaka. In the battle, 137 Italians were killed, and 160 were taken prisoner, along with all their equipment, including 4 mortars, 20 automatic weapons, and over 2,000 grenades. The partisans released their prisoners, but kept the equipment.

The Greek side had only seven casualties.

== Sources ==
- Eudes, Dominique (1973). The Kapetanios: Partisans and Civil War in Greece, 1943-1949. Translated by John Howe. New York and London: Monthly Review Press. ISBN 978-0-85345-275-1.
- Hellenic Army History Directorate (1998). Αρχεία Εθνικής Αντίστασης, 1941-1944 [National Resistance Archives, 1941-1944]. Athens: Hellenic Army History Directorate. ISBN 978-9607897060.
- Mazower, Mark (1993). Inside Hitler's Greece: The Experience of Occupation, 1941–44. New Haven and London: Yale University Press. ISBN 0-300-06552-3.
