= Bauduen =

- Commune
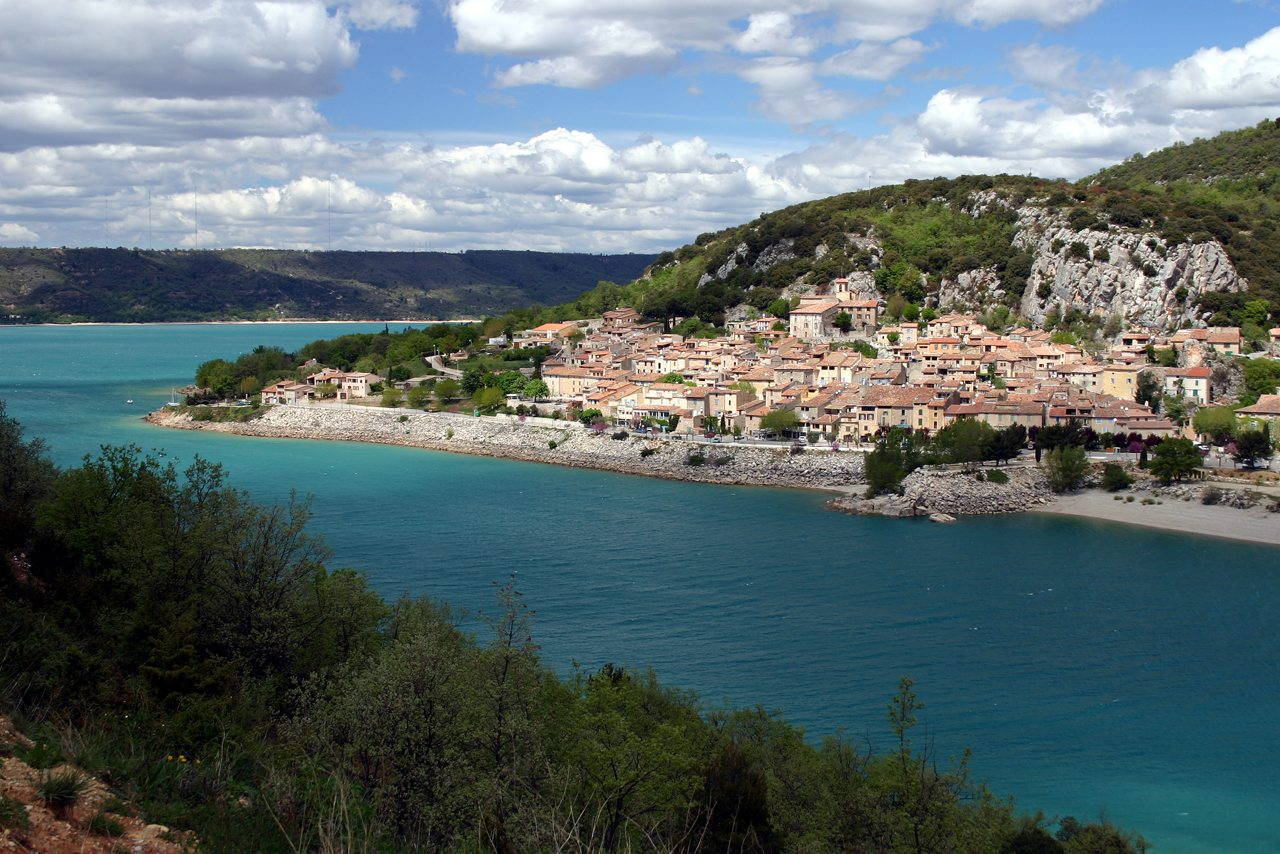
- A view of the village of Bauduen on the banks of Lake of Sainte-Croix

- Coat of arms
- Location of Bauduen
- Location within France Location within Provence-Alpes-Côte d'Azur
- Coordinates: 43°44′05″N 6°10′36″E
- Country: France
- Region: Provence-Alpes-Côte d'Azur
- Department: Var
- Arrondissement: Brignoles
- Canton: Flayosc

Government
  - Mayor (2024–2026): Joël Boulleret
- Area^{1}: 47.45 km^{2} (18.32 sq mi)
- Elevation: 484 m (1,588 ft)
- Highest elevation: 1,144 m (3,753 ft)
- Lowest elevation: 470 m (1,540 ft)
- Population (2023): 308
  - Density: 6.49/km^{2} (16.8/sq mi)
- Time zone: UTC+01:00 (CET)
  - Summer (DST): UTC+02:00 (CEST)
- INSEE/Postal code: 83015 /83630
- ^{1} French Land Register data, which excludes lakes, ponds, glaciers > 1 km^{2} (0.386 sq mi or 247 acres) and river estuaries.

Bauduen (French pronunciation: [bodɥɛ̃]) is a rural commune in the Var department in the Provence-Alpes-Côte d'Azur region in Southeastern France. As of 2023, the population of the commune was 308.

== See also ==
- Communes of the Var department
- Lac de Sainte-Croix
