= Lake of Sainte-Croix =

Lake in Var and Alpes-de-Haute-Provence, France

- Lac de Sainte-Croix (French)
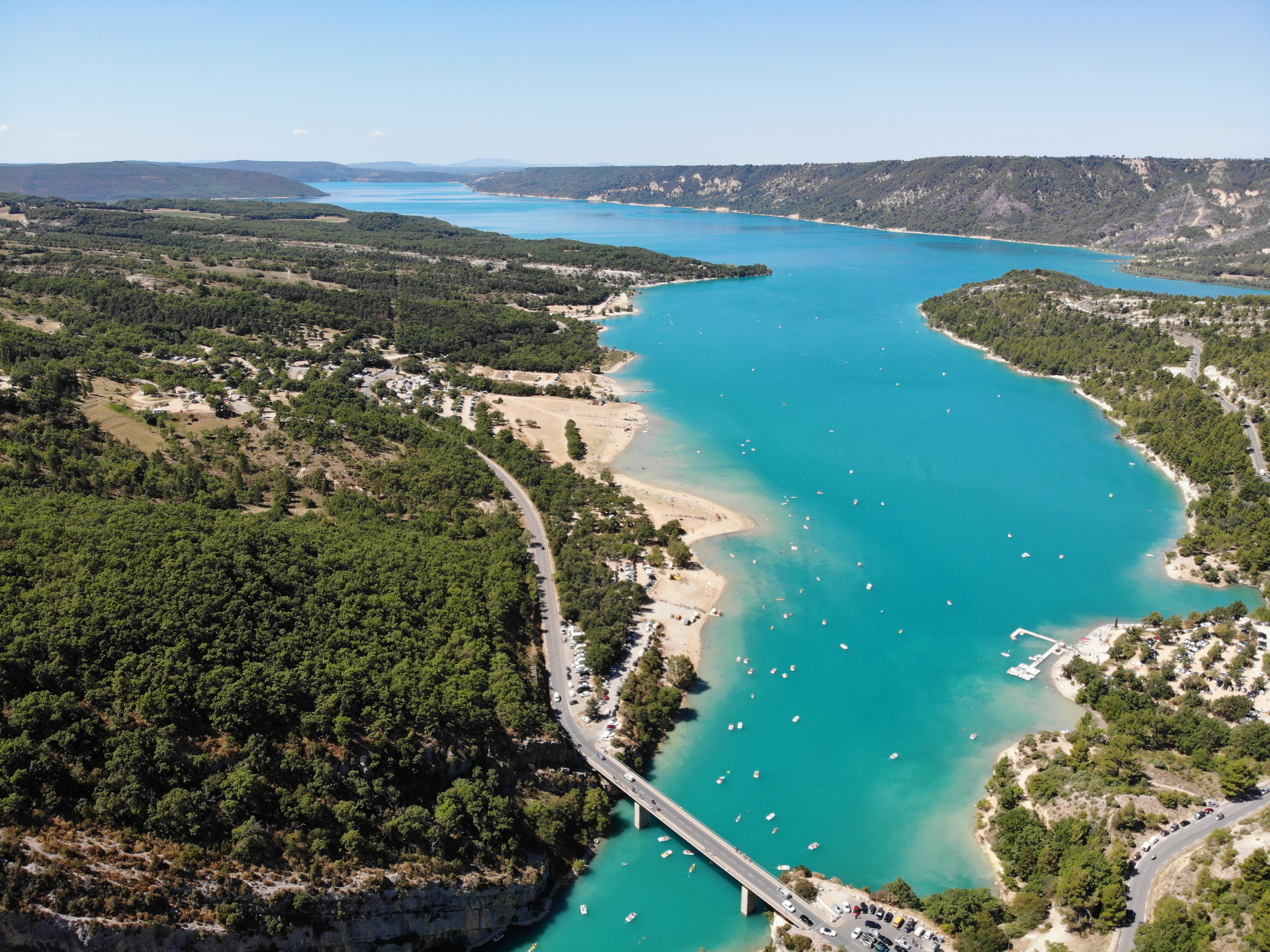
- The lake seen from the northeast, with the Pont du Galetas at the bottom, on the border between Var and Alpes-de-Haute-Provence

- Location within Provence-Alpes-Côte d'Azur
- Location: Var/Alpes-de-Haute-Provence
- Coordinates: 43°45′49″N 6°11′2″E
- Type: Reservoir
- Primary inflows: Verdon
- Primary outflows: Verdon
- Catchment area: 1,591 km^{2} (614 sq mi)
- Basin countries: France
- Surface area: 22 km^{2} (8.5 sq mi)
- Max. depth: 93 m (305 ft)
- Water volume: 760×10^{6} m^{3} (27×10^{9} cu ft)
- Surface elevation: 477 m (1,565 ft)
- Settlements: Les Salles-sur-Verdon, Sainte-Croix-du-Verdon, Bauduen

The Lake of Sainte-Croix (French: Lac de Sainte-Croix, pronounced [lak də sɛ̃tkʁwa]; Occitan: Lac de Santa Croza) is a reservoir in Southern France that was formed by the construction, between 1971 and 1974 (when it was put into service), of a reinforced-concrete arch dam, the Sainte-Croix Dam. It marks the departmental border between Var to the southeast and Alpes-de-Haute-Provence to the northwest.

== Geography ==
The reservoir is fed by the Verdon river, at the outlet of the Verdon Gorge. It holds a maximum of 761 million cubic metres of water. The dam, which generates 142 million kWh of electricity per year, is 94 metres high, 7.5 metres thick at its base and 3 metres thick at its crest.

The village of Les Salles-sur-Verdon stands by the lake; it was rebuilt on the shore after the original lower village was destroyed to make room for the reservoir. Other villages around the lake are Bauduen and Sainte-Croix-du-Verdon. The lake comprises a sole island, the Île de Costebelle (Island of Costebelle), part of the commune of Les Salles-sur-Verdon.

== Recreation ==
Rental providers of pedal, electric and sail boats, as well as canoes and kayaks exist at various locations around the lake, particularly at the shore of the village Les Salles-sur-Verdon and the entrance to the Verdon Gorge. There is also various supervised and un-supervised swimming spots and a number of rocks commonly used as jumping in points.

== Firefighting ==
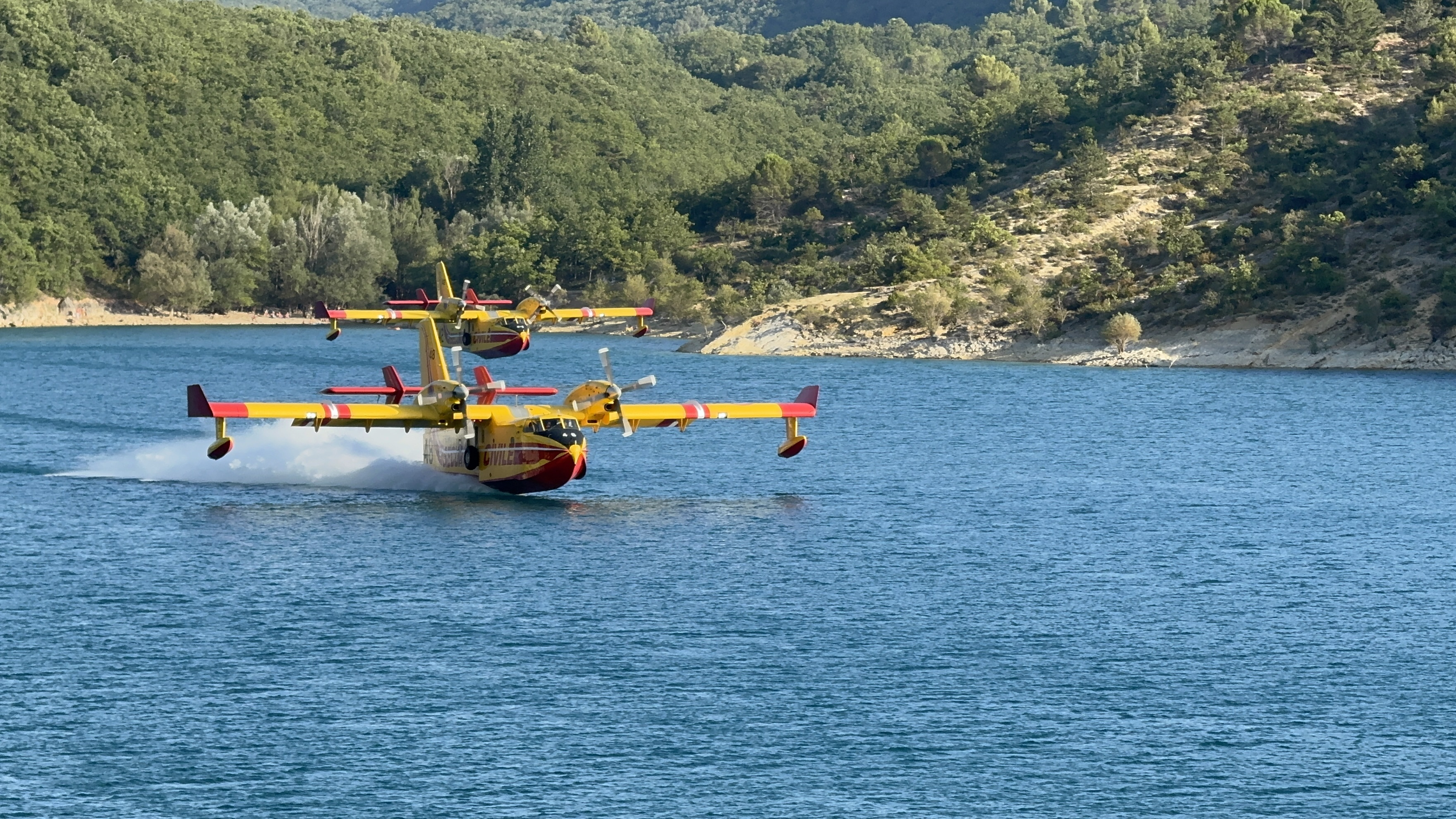
2 Canadair CL-415s at the Lake

The lake has been used as a water source for aerial firefighting craft to tackle wildfires in the region. While it is in use for this purpose, crossing the minor axis of the lake is forbidden, this being enforced by a lifeguard boat.

In 2004, a Canadair CL-415 on a training flight crashed while performing a scooping manoeuvre. One pilot was rescued but the other two occupants were killed. The wreckage sunk to a depth of 31 metres near Les Salles-sur-Verdon.

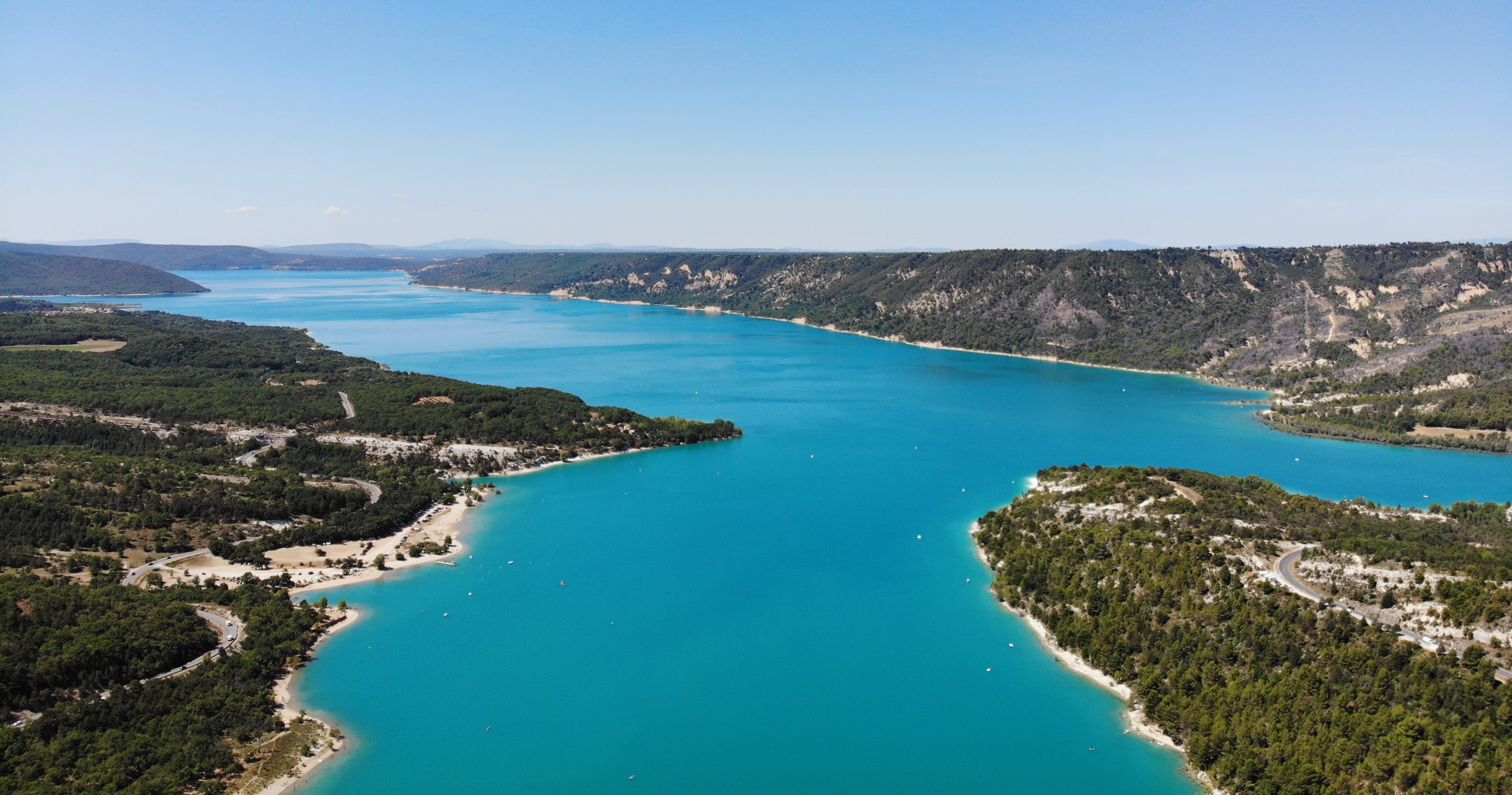
The Lake of Sainte-Croix seen from the outlet of the Verdon Gorge

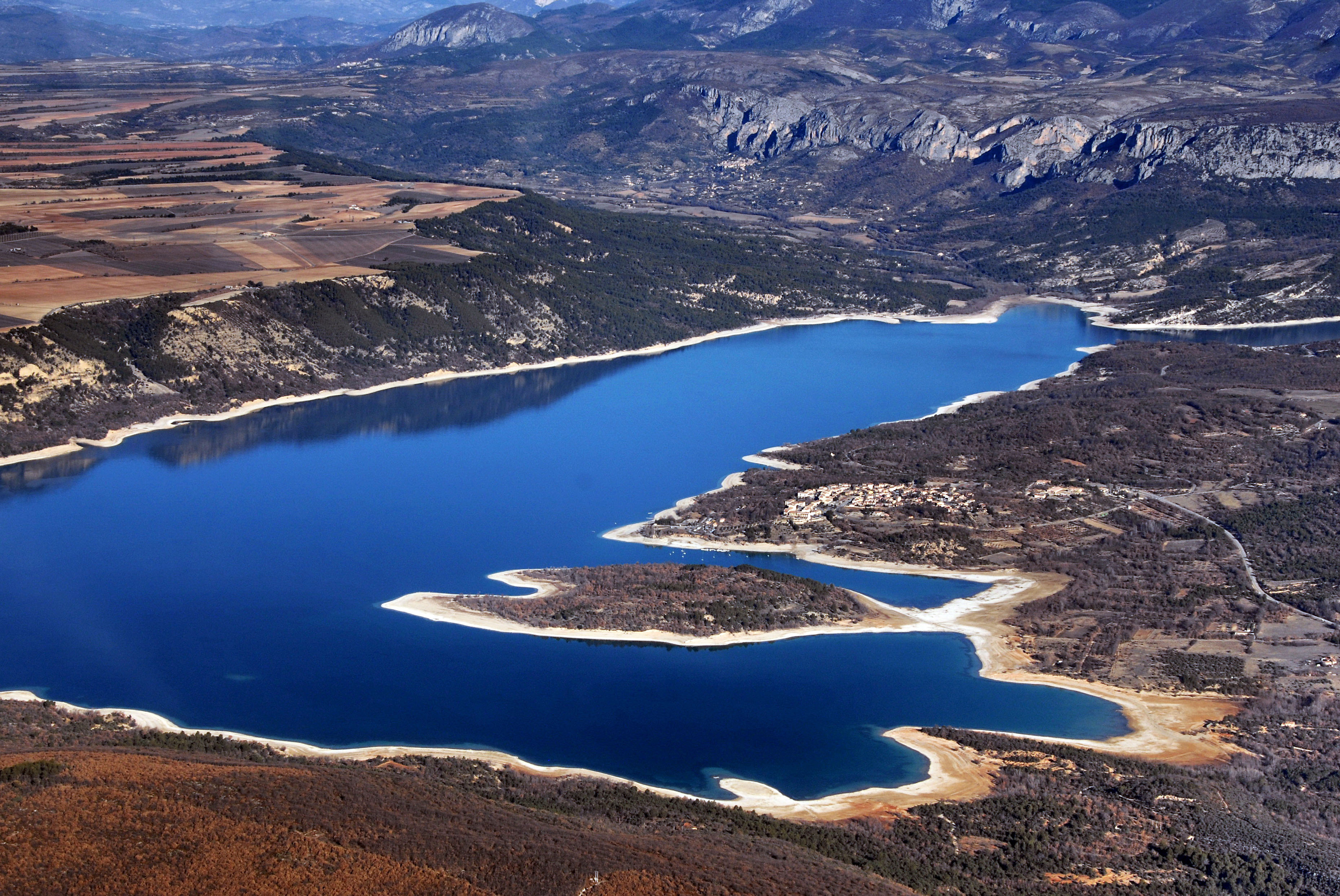
Les Salles-sur-Verdon seen from the southeast

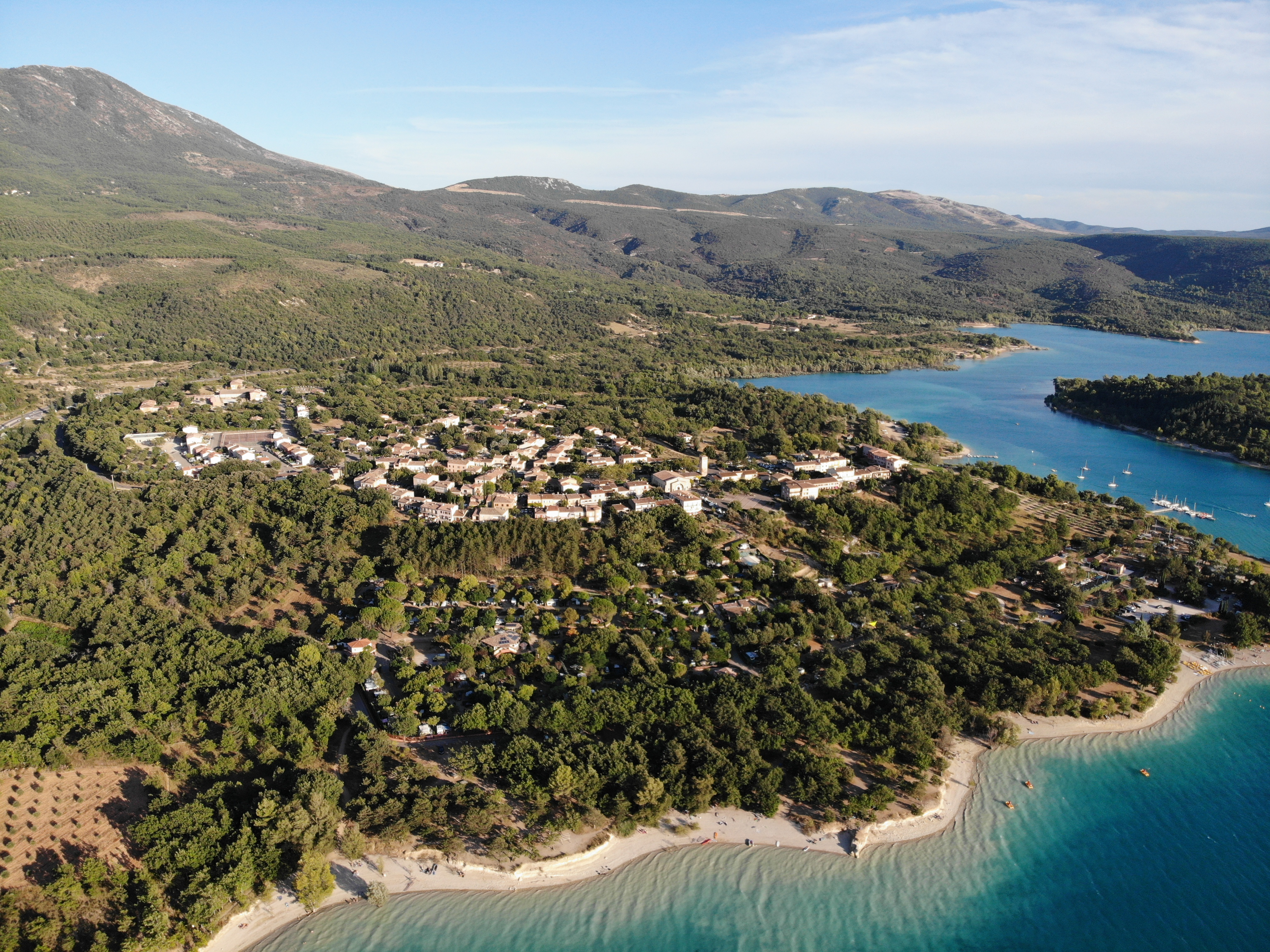
Les Salles-sur-Verdon by the lake

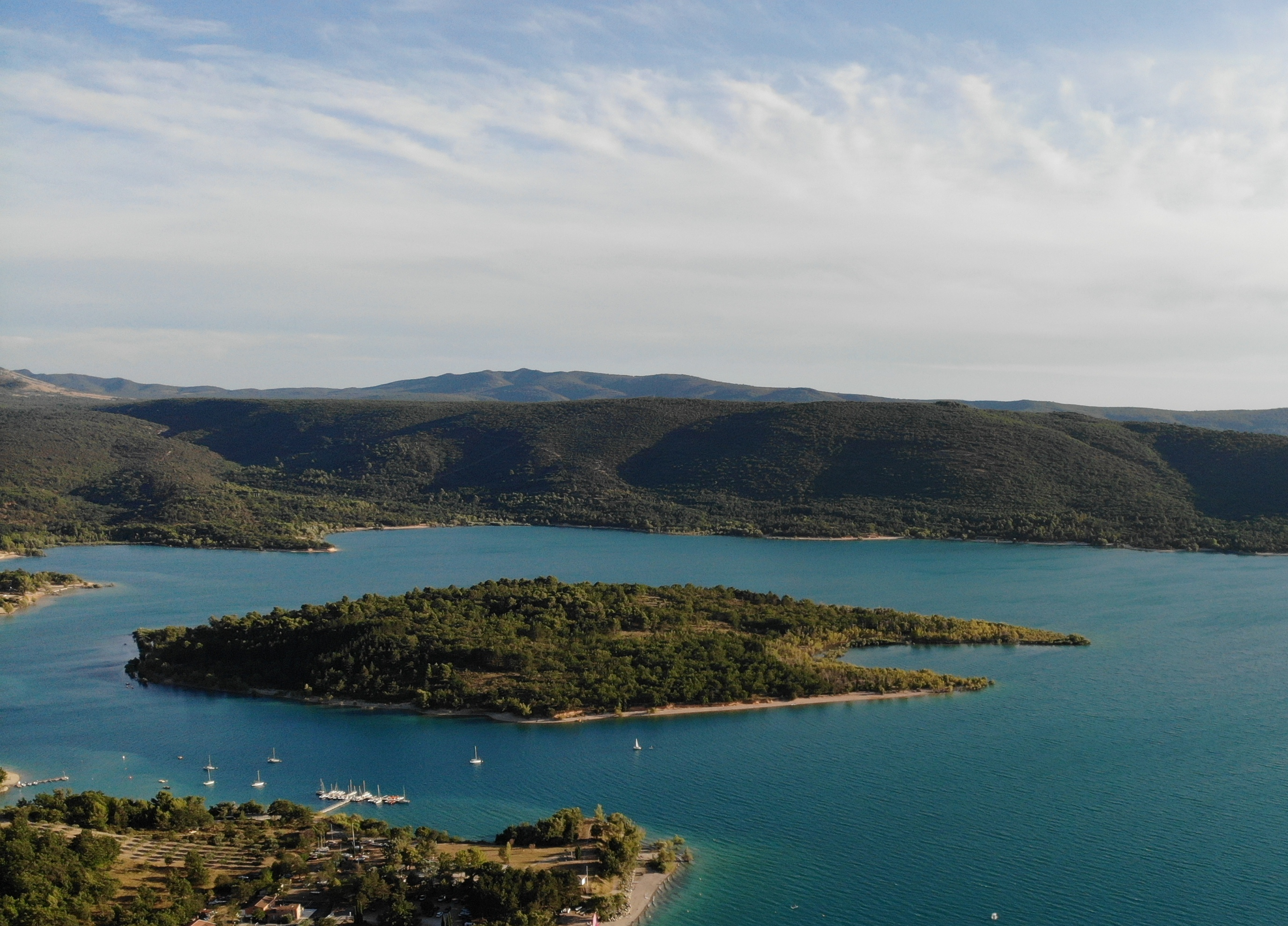
The Île de Costebelle
