= Lucy Hughes-Hallett =

British writer (born 1951)

Lucy Hughes-Hallett FRSL
- Born: 7 December 1951 (age 74)
- Notable work: The Pike: Gabriele D'Annunzio, Poet, Seducer and Preacher of War (2013)
- Spouse: Dan Franklin (m. 1984)
- Children: 2
- Awards: Samuel Johnson Prize; 2013 Costa Book Award; Duff Cooper Prize

Lucy Angela Hughes-Hallett (born 7 December 1951) is a British cultural historian, biographer and novelist.

In November 2013, she won the Samuel Johnson Prize for nonfiction for her biography of the Italian writer Gabriele D'Annunzio, entitled The Pike. The book also won the 2013 Costa Book Award (Biography) and the Duff Cooper Prize. Her most recent book is The Scapegoat: The Brilliant Brief Life of the Duke of Buckingham (2024).

== Biography ==
Lucy Hughes-Hallett has written several works of nonfiction: Cleopatra, Heroes, The Pike: Gabriele d'Annunzio, and The Scapegoat: The Brilliant Brief Life of the Duke of Buckingham. According to Hughes-Hallet, for her biography Cleopatra and Heroes she drew significantly from Lives by Plutarch. In 2013, for her book The Pike about Gabriele D'Annunzio, she won the Samuel Johnson Prize, Costa Book Award, and Duff Cooper Prize.

Her novel Peculiar Ground covers 400 years in the history of a fictional country estate in England. According to Hughes-Hallett, she grew up on a similar estate until the age of 17, where her father worked as agent. Peculiar Ground is set partly in the 1660s and partly during the Cold War.

In her collection of short stories, Fabulous, she reimagines stories from classical mythology, the Bible, and folklore, setting them in modern Britain.

Hughes-Hallett was a Vogue Talent Contest prizewinner in 1973 and subsequently worked for five years as a feature writer on the magazine. In 1978, she won the Catherine Pakenham Award for Young Female Journalists for a profile of Roald Dahl. Since then, Hughes-Hallett has written on books and arts for all of the British broadsheet newspapers including The Sunday Times and The Guardian. She was television critic of the London Evening Standard for five years.

Hughes-Hallett is a fellow of the Royal Society of Literature and an Honorary Fellow of the Historical Association. She has judged the WH Smith Literary Award, the Duff Cooper Prize, the Encore Award, the RSL Jerwood Award, the Rathbones Folio Prize, and the Hawthornden Prize. In 2021, she was the Chair of the Judges of the International Booker Prize.

In 2025, she continued to write film and literary critiques for The Telegraph and The Guardian.

== Personal life ==
In 1984, she married publisher Dan Franklin. They have two daughters.

Her brother is Thomas Hughes-Hallett.

== Selected publications ==
- 1990: Cleopatra: Histories, Dreams and Distortions. New York: Harper & Row; Revised edition, HarperCollins Publishers, 2026.
- 2004:. Heroes: Saviours, Traitors and Supermen. London: Harper Press; Heroes (Saviours, Traitors and Supermen), New York: Alfred A. Knopf.
- 2013: The Pike: Gabriele D'Annunzio, Poet, Seducer and Preacher of War, London: 4th Estate; Gabriele d'Annunzio: Poet, Seducer, and Preacher of War, New York: Alfred A. Knopf.
- 2017: Peculiar Ground: A Novel, London: 4th Estate.
- 2019: Fabulous: Stories, London: 4th Estate.
- 2024: The Scapegoat: The Brilliant Brief Life of the Duke of Buckingham, London: 4th Estate; New York: HarperCollins Publishers.
