= Sainte-Croix-du-Verdon =

- Commune
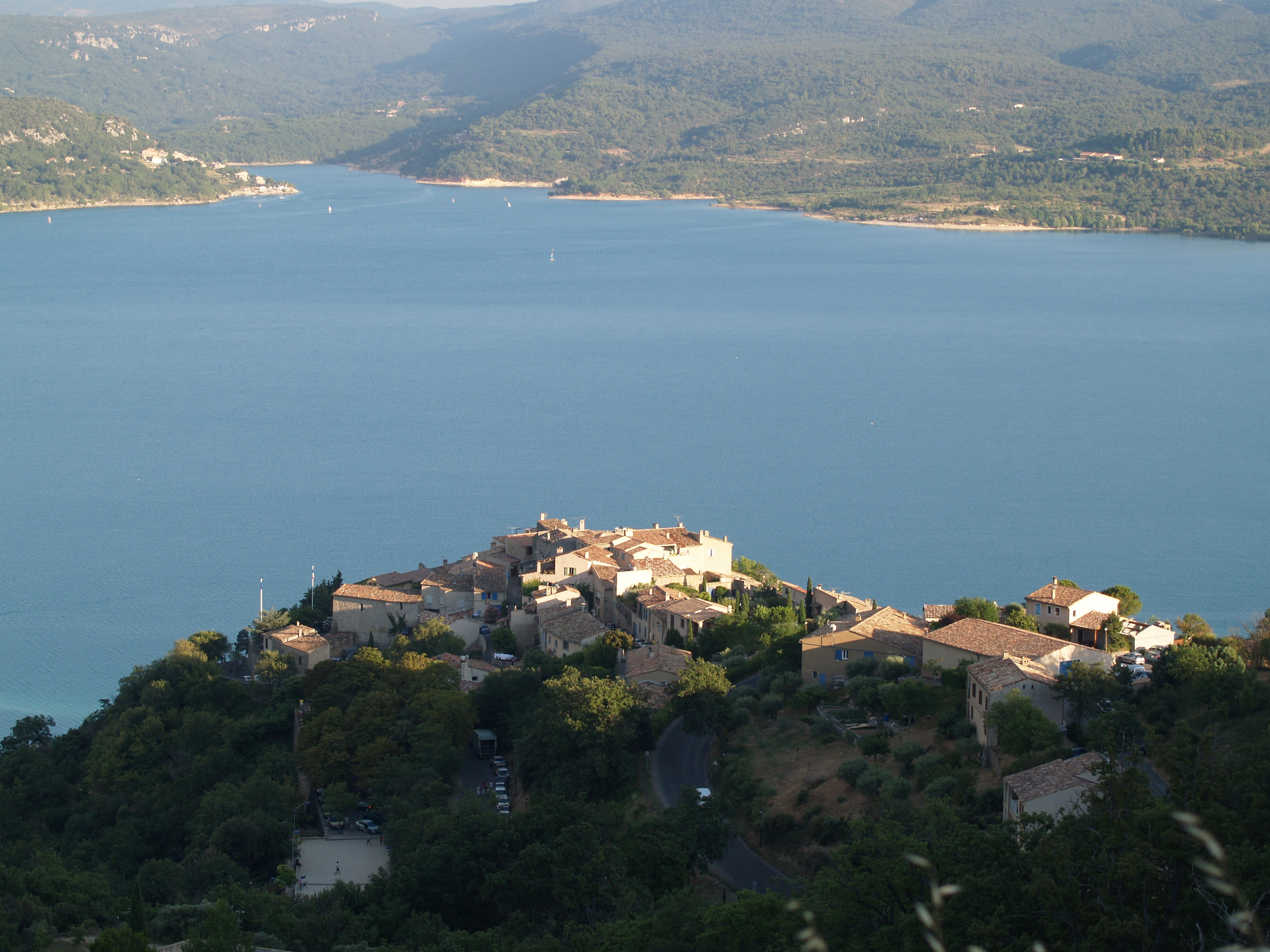
- A general view of the village of Sainte-Croix-du-Verdon and the Lake of Sainte-Croix

- Coat of arms
- Location of Sainte-Croix-du-Verdon
- Location within France Location within Provence-Alpes-Côte d'Azur
- Coordinates: 43°45′35″N 6°09′07″E
- Country: France
- Region: Provence-Alpes-Côte d'Azur
- Department: Alpes-de-Haute-Provence
- Arrondissement: Digne-les-Bains
- Canton: Valensole
- Intercommunality: CA Provence-Alpes

Government
  - Mayor (2026–32): Bruno Bourjac
- Area^{1}: 13.7 km^{2} (5.3 sq mi)
- Elevation: 513 m (1,683 ft)
- Highest elevation: 669 m (2,195 ft)
- Lowest elevation: 443 m (1,453 ft)
- Population (2023): 113
  - Density: 8.25/km^{2} (21.4/sq mi)
- Time zone: UTC+01:00 (CET)
  - Summer (DST): UTC+02:00 (CEST)
- INSEE/Postal code: 04176 /04500
- ^{1} French Land Register data, which excludes lakes, ponds, glaciers > 1 km^{2} (0.386 sq mi or 247 acres) and river estuaries.

Sainte-Croix-du-Verdon (French pronunciation: [sɛ̃t kʁwa dy vɛʁdɔ̃], literally Sainte-Croix of Verdon; Provençal: Santa Crotz de Verdon) is a commune in the Alpes-de-Haute-Provence department in southeastern France.

Prior to 16 September 2005, the commune was known as Sainte-Croix-de-Verdon.

== Population ==
Historical population
Year	Pop.	±% p.a.
1968	107	—
1975	61	−7.71%
1982	77	+3.38%
1990	87	+1.54%
1999	102	+1.78%
2007	140	+4.04%
2012	122	−2.71%
2017	119	−0.50%
2023	113	−0.86%
Source: INSEE

== See also ==
- Lac de Sainte-Croix
- Communes of the Alpes-de-Haute-Provence department
