= The Discovery of Middle Earth: Mapping the Lost World of the Celts =

2013 non-fiction book by Graham Robb

- Author: Graham Robb
- Genre: Non-fiction
- Publisher: Norton and Company
- Publication date: October 2013
- Pages: 416
- ISBN: 978-0-393-34992-4

The Discovery of Middle Earth is a 2013 non-fiction book by British author Graham Robb. Drawing on ancient maps and other archival sources, Robb argues that the ancient Celts organized territories and determined the locations of settlements, potential battle sites, and tribal migration routes based on solstice lines and latitude lines related to the Greek system of klimata.

As evidence, Robb presents interpretations of artistic geometries, road surveying, and Greek "centuriations." He suggests these alignments predate the Roman Empire. The book was published by Norton and Company. It was well received for its contributions to ancient geography, mathematics, and European ethnography. The New York Times cited its "intricacies of archaeological methods" in building an ancient Celtic detective story.

== Summary ==
The book is divided into four sections, beginning in the Iron Age, moving the through Druidic history, and culminating with an argument for a modern appreciation of Europe as a Celtic "middle Earth." Roads are central to Robb's analysis: he details the Heraklean Way, which ran across the Iberian Peninsula as early as the sixth century BCE. Two chapters are spent on the Mediolanum mystery, an archeological debate over the dates of first sophisticated settlements in the Po Valley of Italy.

=== Part one ===
With roads used as indicators, Robb connects towns, battle sites, and solstice sites across Europe. His analysis of Celtic toponyms suggest not just clusters of settlements but very precise dividing lines between Celtic and non-Celtic territories in places like ancient Iberia and France.

The documentation of linguistic and archeological evidence serves to illustrate the wider European movement from the Bronze Age to the Iron Age through the La Tène culture. Pre-Roman Gaul or Celtica may fairly be described as a Celtic civilization, encompassing not just modern-day France but parts of the low countries and Alpine Europe approximately 2,500 YBP. Robb pays particular attention to field boundaries or survey points, areas where settlements and crop and topography types were divided. He finds that where the "protohistoric past falls silent, the figures of Celtic legend sometimes appear along the field boundaries, speaking an unexpectedly comprehensible tongue." The Bituriges appear to be the first large tribe that definitively enters written history.

=== Part two ===
Robb ties this cultural transmission of latitude and longitude coordination to Greek seafaring as well as Celtic pathmaking within the European interior. He traces the routes of Pytheas, for instance, around Northern Europe, the British Isles, and the French Mediterranean when the Roman Republic was still young. The later expansion of the Roman Empire would bury much of this Greco-Celtic past. The book is often at a degree's remove from the original source, detailing the Roman and later medieval archivists who knew of Greek originals as well Celtic standing stones and other archeological remnants.

The "Druidic syllabus" occupies much of the book's second portion. No physical Druidic school has been identified but from Timagenes in the century before Christ through Welsh epic poetry half-a-millennium later, the Druids are consistently identified with learning and oral transfer of knowledge. They appear to have been particularly interested in Pythagorean philosophy as well as animal husbandry and the medicinal properties of plants, typical of early agrarian societies. Historians of wider Indo-European history have identified corollaries with the Hindu Brahmin tradition.

=== Part three ===
Consistency in town layout and the emergence of coinage is another clue that Robb identifies in arguing for widespread societies. These oppida (singular oppidum) have been found from Britain to the Balkans. Dating from before Christ, they occupy high ground and are almost always adjacent to watercourses with defensive characteristics. Coinage, often stamped with horse and forest mythos, emerged alongside the oppida. Mercenary Celts found their way to Galatia (modern-day Turkey), Ptolemaic Egypt, and were among the elite troops of Herod the Great in Second Temple Israel. The ancient Celts were willing to adopt the customs of local societies, whether of the simple pre-Indo-European or more sophisticated Mediterranean types.

"Celt" has thus come down to history as a sociolinguistic and warrior identity rather than an ethnic one: the "most ardent Celtic supremacist despair[s] of ever identifying any fundamental ethnic trait of Homo celticus." Celticity is identifiable in time, emerging with the first Indo-European waves 3,000 to 4,000 YPB and cohering around 2,500 YPB, but not with a particular place. This is evidenced by modern efforts to locate a "homeland" across Celtic territory from Ireland, to Germany, to the Caucasus.

=== Part four ===
Throughout the third and into the fourth sections, Robb documents Celtic polytheism. The most important deity was likely Lugh, the sun god, seen on coinage and believed to be the initiator of warrior reincarnation as late as the Gallic Wars. A handful of powerful Druidic priests helped organize the Celtic resistance to Rome. Robb notes that in retrospect the "stubbornness of the Celtic armies seems tragically self-defeating."

The cartographic genius inherent in the gridlines was fundamentally geometric and mathematical, passed through the Druidic traditions of temple consecration, boundary settling, and kingly counsel. They may have advanced as far as understanding irrational numbers such as the square root of pi. The Christianization of Celtic lands enriched the iconographic tradition of the tribes but may have served to bury this earlier system of cultural mapping and mathematics. Beginning with Pope Gregory circa 600 CE the church "absorbed rather than abolished" this earlier cultural heritage. The Celtic world was also still reeling at this point from Caesar's conquest of Gaul, a civilizational blow from which it would never fully recover. Toward the work's conclusion Robb elucidates surviving Celtic identity in the "poetic Isles," Ireland and Britain, still replete with Celtic place names and long-standing Celtic mythologies.

== Reception ==
The book was well received by critics, particularly its presentation of novel synthesis from evidence hidden in plain sight. Publishers Weekly writes that Robb "upends nearly everything we believe about the history...of early Europe and its barbarous Celtic tribes and semimythical Druids. Popularly dismissed as superstitious, wizarding hermits, Robb demonstrates how the Druids were perhaps the most intellectually advanced thinkers of their age."

In his New York Times review, Ian Morris similarly praised the book's ground-level observations while questioning some of its findings. He calls the data presentation "undisciplined," suggesting that speculations on links between worship of Celtic gods and astronomical knowledge is an overreach. A short review in the Library Journal argues that the lay reader might have trouble with the details of the solstice lines but that Robb's work ought to please specialists with its etymologies, battle sites, and ancient earthworks. A better understanding of the relationship between Celt and Roman is praised in the reviews.
