= Aileen Ward =

American professor of English literature (1919 – 2016)

- Born: April 1, 1919
- Died: May 31, 2016
- Occupation: Professor of English Literature
- Known for: "John Keats: The Making of a Poet"

Aileen Ward (1 April 1919 – 31 May 2016), was an American professor of English literature who won both a National Book Award and a Duff Cooper Memorial Prize for her book "John Keats: The Making of a Poet".

== Early life and education ==
Aileen Coursen Ward was born on April 1, 1919, in Newark, New Jersey and grew up in Summit, N.J. Her father, Waldron, was a lawyer; her mother was the former Aline Coursen.

After earning a B.A. in English from Smith College in 1940, she enrolled in Radcliffe College, where she was awarded her M.A. in 1942 and a doctorate in 1953. Her dissertation was on poetic metaphor.

== Academic career ==
Professor Ward taught at Wellesley and Barnard. She joined the Vassar English department in 1954. Later in her career Ward taught at Sarah Lawrence, Brandeis and New York University. She retired in 1990.

Ward spent nine years researching “John Keats: The Making of a Poet". The book won two major awards, the 1964 National Book Award (in the category Arts and Letters (nonfiction)), and the Duff Cooper Memorial Prize of 1963.

She was awarded a Guggenheim Fellowship in 1966.

== Selected works ==
- Ward, Aileen. John Keats: The Making of a Poet. New York: Viking Press, 1963.
- Ward, Aileen. The Unfurling of Entity: Metaphor in Poetic Theory. New York: Garland Pub, 1987. ISBN 9780824000813
- De, Quincey T, and Aileen Ward. Confessions of an English Opium-Eater, and Other Writings ... Edited and with a Foreword by Aileen Ward. New American Library; New York & Toronto; New English Library: London, 1966.
- Keats, John, Aileen Ward, and David Gentleman. The Poems of John Keats. New York: Heritage Press, 1966.
- Ward, Aileen. "Canterbury Revisited: The Blake-Cromek Controversy." Blake: An Illustrated Quarterly 22 (1988).
- Ward, Aileen. "The forging of Orc: Blake and the idea of revolution." TriQuarterly 23 (1972): 204.

== Personal life ==
Ward died on May 31, 2016. At the time she was still working on a biography of William Blake, as she had been for nearly 50 years.
