= John Keats: The Making of a Poet =

Biography of Keats, by Aileen Ward

- First edition
- Author: Aileen Ward
- Published: Secker & Warburg (1963)
- Media type: Print
- Pages: 488
- Awards: National Book Award for Arts and Letters (1964), Duff Cooper Prize (1963)
- ISBN: 0374520291

John Keats: The Making of a Poet is a biography about the poet written by Aileen Ward. After nine years of research, the work was initially published in 1963 by Viking (New York) and Secker & Warburg (London). Revised editions were published in 1986 by Farrar, Straus & Giroux (New York) and Faber & Faber (London).

John Keats: The Making of a Poet was the first major account of the poet's life since the two-volume work, Keats, was written by Amy Lowell in 1925. Ward received a National Book Award for Arts and Letters for the work in 1964.

== Author's personal life and education ==
Ward was born and raised in Newark, New Jersey to Waldron and Aline Coursen. She attended Smith College, where she earned her B.A. in 1940. She then attended Radcliffe, where she earned her MA in 1942 before earning her doctoral degree in 1953.

Eileen Ward died on May 31, 2016, at her home in Santa Monica, California. She was 97.

== Author's career ==
After receiving her doctorate, Ward taught in the Northeast United States at Wellesley College and Barnard College. She then joined the Vassar College English Department in 1954 before later teaching at Sarah Lawrence, Brandeis University, and New York University prior to her retirement in 1990.

== Reviews ==
- " for Aileen Ward, his latest biographer, both the poems and letters are merely reflections of the more important ""inner drama"" which was his life." -Kirkus Reviews
- "My favorite Keats biography is Aileen Ward's John Keats: The Making of a Poet." -Anthony deMello (John Keats Forum)

== Awards ==
- Winner of the Duff Cooper Memorial Prize
- 1964 National Book Award for Arts and Letters (Non-fiction)
