= The Pike: Gabriele D'Annunzio, Poet, Seducer and Preacher of War =

2013 book by Lucy Hughes-Hallett

The Pike: Gabriele d'Annunzio, Poet, Seducer and Preacher of War
- First edition
- Author: Lucy Hughes-Hallett
- Publisher: Fourth Estate
- Publication date: January 1, 2013
- Pages: 694
- ISBN: 9780007213962 Paperback

The Pike: Gabriele d'Annunzio, Poet, Seducer and Preacher of War is a 2013 book by the writer Lucy Hughes-Hallett first published in London by Fourth Estate. The American edition, published by Knopf in 2013, is titled Gabriele d'Annunzio: Poet, Seducer, and Preacher of War. The book is a biography of Gabriele d'Annunzio, although it is written in a style more commonly seen in fiction, which echoes that of d'Annunzio's autobiography. Finding mere chronology insufficient for telling the story of her "extraordinary, unstoppable and in many ways quite ridiculous" subject, Hughes-Hallett "tries out a variety of cross-sections and settings, mosaics and micro-narratives," as Robert Gordon wrote in Literary Review.

It won the Samuel Johnson Prize, the Duff Cooper Prize, and the Costa Book Award for Biography.

== Reviews ==
- The Economist book review
- The Financial Times book review
- The Guardian book review
- The Independent book review
- New York Times book review
- The Observer book review
- The Telegraph book review
- Times Higher Education book review
