= The Discovery of France =

2007 book by Graham Robb

- First edition (UK)
- Author: Graham Robb
- Language: English
- Publisher: Picador (UK)
- Publication date: September 2007
- Publication place: United Kingdom
- Media type: Print (hardback & paperback)
- Pages: 454
- ISBN: 0330427601
- Website: The Discovery of France

The Discovery of France: A Historical Geography, from the Revolution to the First World War is a book by Graham Robb. It was published in September 2007 in the United Kingdom by Picador and in October 2007 in the United States by W. W. Norton and Company. The book, a result of cycling 14,000 miles (23,000 km) around France coupled with four years of research, is an in-depth examination of French national identity as seen through the diverse cultures and languages contained within the country.

== Reception ==
=== In the popular press ===
Writing for The Guardian, British historian Andrew Hussey described it as an "elegant, entertaining and occasionally brilliant overview of France past and present", noting that despite Robb's academic background in French literature, it is written in the style of an accomplished novelist, and lamented that the "discovery" of this element of French history was identified by an English writer, and was yet to be "discovered" by the French themselves. In the Boston Globe, Richard Eder suggested that the time spent on the bicycle provided Robb with a fresh approach to telling the history of France, but the four years he spent in the library meant there was a "conscientious pursuit" of detail within the book, covering such a wide variety of topics such as road building, touring, postcards, seaside development, spas, cave exploration, marsh reclamation, and the mountaineering vogue, which weighed the book down and detracted from the core themes.

On April 28, 2008, the book was awarded the £10,000 Ondaatje Prize by the Royal Society of Literature in London. It also won the 2007 Duff Cooper Prize, earning Robb £5,000.

=== Among scholars of modern French history ===
Compared to its reception in the popular press, the response the book elicited among scholars of modern French history was "uniformly negative, even indignant", according to Steven Kale, Professor of History at Washington State University. Writing in H-France Review, he said that its "pervasive ahistorical anti-modernism is almost as irritating as its scholarly inadequacies". He detected that "its appeal has more to do with….the opinion of a certain segment of the Anglo-American middle class, for whom Robb’s anti-modernist green progressivism has broad resonance".

David Bell, Professor of History at Princeton University, specialising in French history, called it "a distressingly bad book", being little more than a "recycling of nineteenth-century myths". In a lengthy and detailed review in The New Republic, Bell said that Robb "failed to read or failed to understand most of the secondary works in his own bibliography". Robb was "trying to resuscitate a vision of pre-modern French rural life that serious scholarship has by now thoroughly discredited".

Another historian from the United States, Joseph A. Amato, said the book would please those who like evocative stories of history, but that it does not provide much in the way of extended analyses and argumentations.

== Translations ==
It has been translated into French under the title of Une Histoire buissonnière de la France, published by Libres Champs and into Dutch under the title De ontdekking van Frankrijk by Atlas and Olympos.
