= The Greek Revolution =

Book by Mark Mazower

The Greek Revolution: 1821 and the Making of Modern Europe
- Cover art
- Author: Mark Mazower
- ISBN: 978-0-698-16398-0

The Greek Revolution: 1821 and the Making of Modern Europe is a book by historian Mark Mazower, published by Penguin Press in 2021.

== Content ==
In the book Mazower retells the 1821 Greek Revolution, also known as the Greek War of Independence—a revolt in which Greece gained independence from the Ottoman Empire after several years of fighting—from Greek and international perspectives. Initially, the Great Powers opposed Greece's independence, but later changed their mind and defeated an Ottoman fleet at the Battle of Navarino that led to the Ottoman Empire's defeat. Mazower explores the philhellenic movement popular in Europe and argues that outside views of the Greek Revolution gave rise to the rise of nationalism in Europe and the modern nation-state system. The events in Greece became a hook for contemporary discussions of issues such as slavery, humanitarian intervention, European identity, and population transfer.

== Reception ==
A New York Times review by Alan Mikhail states that Mazower wrote "a largely internationalist history of what is often seen as a local event". However, he faults Mazower for not fleshing out the Ottoman part of the story and sometimes presenting a one-sided view of Ottoman Turks.

The Economist's review states that Mazower's book "holds lessons for modern geopolitics: about the galvanising effects of violence, the role of foreign intervention and the design flaws in dreams".
