= Les Salles-sur-Verdon =

- Commune
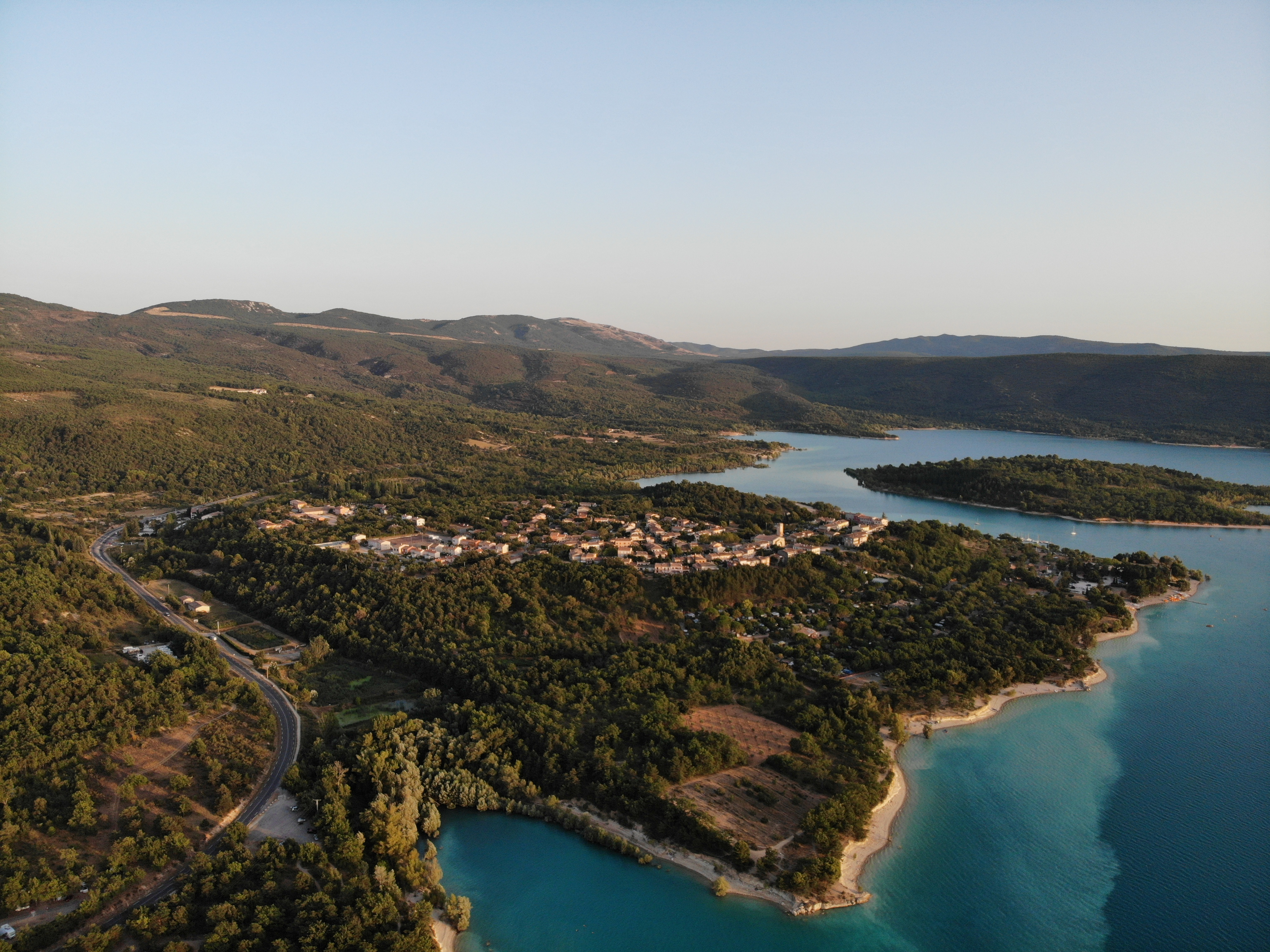

- Coat of arms
- Location of Les Salles-sur-Verdon
- Location within France Location within Provence-Alpes-Côte d'Azur
- Coordinates: 43°46′26″N 6°12′33″E
- Country: France
- Region: Provence-Alpes-Côte d'Azur
- Department: Var
- Arrondissement: Brignoles
- Canton: Flayosc

Government
  - Mayor (2020–2026): Denise Guigues
- Area^{1}: 4.97 km^{2} (1.92 sq mi)
- Elevation: 500 m (1,600 ft)
- Highest elevation: 685 m (2,247 ft)
- Lowest elevation: 475 m (1,558 ft)
- Population (2023): 236
  - Density: 47.5/km^{2} (123/sq mi)
- Time zone: UTC+01:00 (CET)
  - Summer (DST): UTC+02:00 (CEST)
- INSEE/Postal code: 83122 /83630
- ^{1} French Land Register data, which excludes lakes, ponds, glaciers > 1 km^{2} (0.386 sq mi or 247 acres) and river estuaries.

Les Salles-sur-Verdon (French pronunciation: [le sal syʁ vɛʁdɔ̃]; Occitan: Lei Salas de Verdon) is a commune in the Var department in the Provence-Alpes-Côte d'Azur region in southeastern France.

== See also ==
- Communes of the Var department
- Lac de Sainte-Croix
