= Dark Continent: Adventure & Exploration in Darkest Africa =

Roleplaying game from New Breed

Dark Continent: Adventure & Exploration in Darkest Africa is a 2000 role-playing game published by New Breed.

== Gameplay ==
Dark Continent: Adventure & Exploration in Darkest Africa is a game in which a Victorian‑era game lets players become intrepid explorers venturing into a mythicized Africa, equipped with guides, scenarios, and setting material to create expeditions.

== Reviews ==
- Pyramid
- Backstab #36
