= Dark Continent: Europe's Twentieth Century =

1998 non-fiction book by Mark Mazower

- Author: Mark Mazower
- Language: English
- Subject: History
- Published: 1998
- Publisher: Allen Lane
- Media type: Print
- Pages: 495
- ISBN: 0713991593

Dark Continent: Europe's Twentieth Century is a 1998 book by Mark Mazower. The book deals with European history from the end of World War I until the Yugoslav Wars in the 1990s. Mazower emphasized the fragility of democracy and argued that a democratic Europe was just one of many possible outcomes of the European 20th century.

== Reception ==
The book received positive reviews from academics.

Mirna Zakic called it "a comprehensive, fresh and incisive analysis". Tony Judt characterized it as an excellent book but argued that Mazower might have overstated his thesis of Europe coming close to following Nazism in the late 30s. According to Judt "the virtues of democracy ... had not been completely forgotten, even in the darkest hours of 1939–40." Donald Sassoon called the book "a stimulating and original interpretation". He praised the book for its breadth and on "containing apposite comments on countries ranging from Bulgaria and Romania to Finland and Denmark." He criticized the book for becoming a little journalistic when turning to recent history.
