= Graham Robb =

British author and critic

Graham Robb FRSL
- Born: June 2, 1958 (age 68); Manchester, England
- Occupations: Author, critic, historian
- Known for: Biographies of French authors, cultural history of France, Celtic studies
- Spouse: Margaret Hambrick (m. 1986)

Academic background
- Education: Royal Grammar School
- Alma mater: Exeter College, Oxford, Vanderbilt University

Academic work
- Discipline: French literature, cultural history
- Sub-discipline: Biography, historical geography

Graham Macdonald Robb FRSL (born 2 June 1958) is a British author and critic specialising in French literature. Historical biography has been his main form of non-fiction.

== Biography ==
Born at Manchester, Robb attended the Royal Grammar School, Worcester, before going up to Exeter College, Oxford to read Modern Languages, graduating with first-class honours in 1981 (BA (Oxon) proceeding MA). In 1982, Robb entered Goldsmiths' College, London to undertake teacher training, before pursuing postgraduate studies at Vanderbilt University in Tennessee where he received a PhD in French literature. He was then awarded a junior research fellowship at Exeter College in the University of Oxford (1987–1990), before leaving academia.

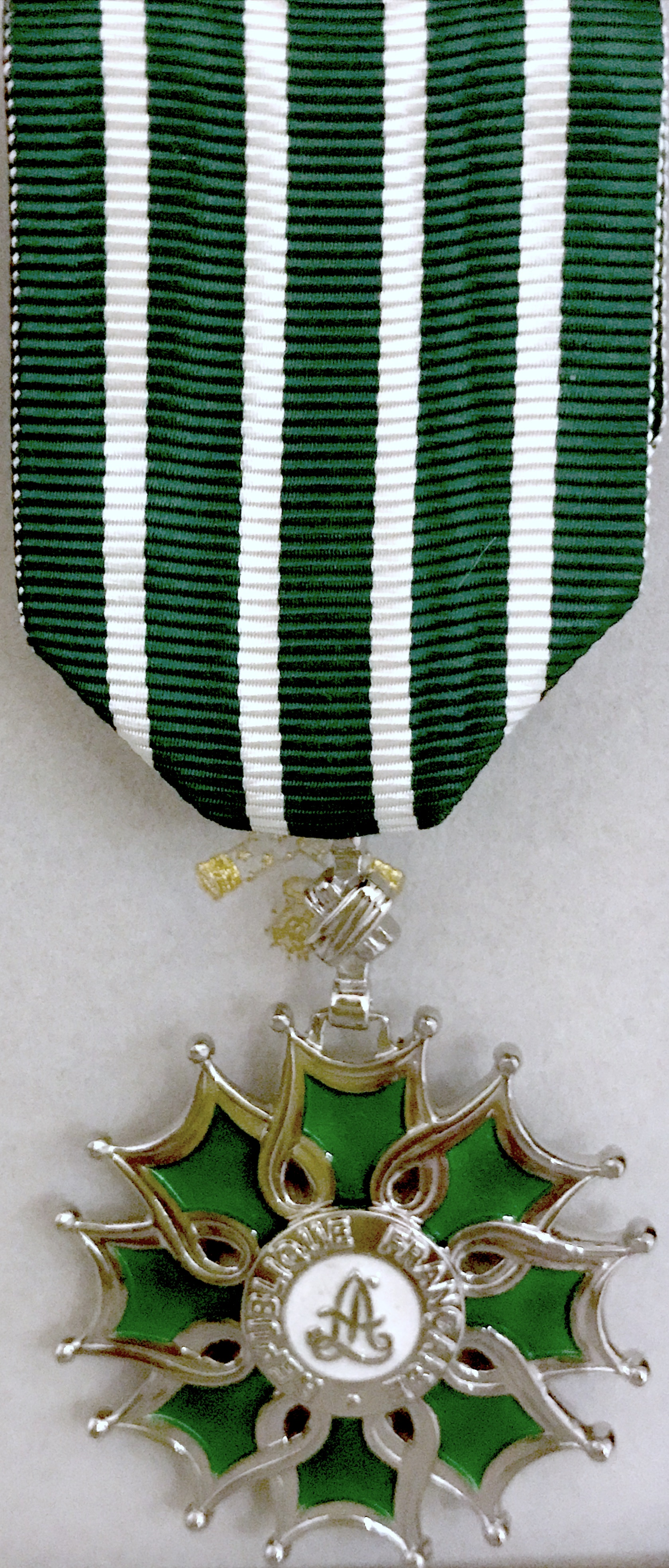
Chevalier des Arts et des Lettres insignia

Robb won the 1997 Whitbread Best Biography Award for Victor Hugo, and was shortlisted for the Samuel Johnson Prize for Rimbaud in 2001. Unlocking Mallarmé had won the Modern Language Association Prize for Independent Scholars in 1996. All three of his biographies (Victor Hugo, Rimbaud and Balzac) became The New York Times "Best Books of the Year". The Discovery of France by Robb won the Duff Cooper Prize in 2007 and the RSL Ondaatje Prize in 2008.

Elected a Fellow of the Royal Society of Literature in 1999, Robb was appointed a Chevalier of the Ordre des Arts et des Lettres in 2009. Following the publication of his French translation of Parisians: An Adventure History of Paris, he was awarded the Medal of the City of Paris in 2012.

Robb married academic Margaret Hambrick in 1986.

== The Discovery of Middle Earth: Mapping the Lost World of the Celts ==
In The Discovery of Middle Earth: Mapping the Lost World of the Celts (2013), he argues that the ancient Celts organized their territories, determined the locations of settlements and battles, and set the trajectories of tribal migrations by establishing a network of solstice lines based on an extension of the Greek system of klimata; as evidence he presented his interpretations of artistic geometries, road surveying, centuriations and what he saw as pre-Roman alignments.

Referring to Robb's discussion of meridians, Sean Rafferty said that "There are of course many problems with this interpretation. Robb’s evidence is either pure speculation or cherry-picking from ambiguous textual sources. There is no reason to suppose any direct ideological connection between the Greeks and the Celtic tribes of Europe, though the two cultures did interact in Eastern Europe. Assuming that mythological stories are true relations of history is highly problematic but regrettably quite common."

In a New York Times book review, historian Ian Morris describes the book as "engaging" and combining "travelogue and historical detective story". He also says it lacks discipline and that "shows little hesitation about going with whatever works and ignoring what doesn't. From the three or four possible sites for the home of the Parisii tribe, he picks the one that falls closest to a meridian. He also rejects the most popular scholarly suggestions for where the Ambiani built their capital and Julius Caesar fought one of his most important battles in favor of less-popular locations that are closer to his lines. Similarly, pointing out that no single place has emerged as the favorite for the location of Mons Graupius, where Rome fought its northernmost battle, Robb puts it where two of his lines intersect." Morris quotes Rafferty who said "At the Euston Road entrance to the British Library, a voice proclaimed the 'druid network' to be nothing but a huge and complex system of personal reference, a testament, not to the druids' genius, but to the ruthless ingenuity of the unconscious mind.

== Bibliography ==
=== Books ===
- Le corsaire-satan en silhouette : le milieu journalistique de la jeunesse de Baudelaire (in French). 1985.
- Baudelaire lecteur de Balzac (1988), ISBN 2-7143-0279-3 (in French)
- Baudelaire (1989), ISBN 0-241-12458-1, translation of 1987 French text by Prof. Claude Pichois
- La Poésie de Baudelaire et la poésie française, 1838–1852 (1993), ISBN 2-7007-1657-4, criticism (in French)
- Balzac: A Biography (1994), ISBN 0-330-33237-6
- Unlocking Mallarmé (1996), ISBN 0-03-000648-1
- Victor Hugo (1997), ISBN 0-330-33707-6
- Rimbaud (2000), ISBN 0-330-48282-3
- Strangers: Homosexual Love in the 19th Century (2003), ISBN 0-330-48223-8
- The Discovery of France. A Historical Geography from the Revolution to the First World War (2007), illustrated, 454 pp. W. W. Norton ISBN 0-393-05973-1
- Parisians: An Adventure History of Paris (2010), W. W. Norton ISBN 978-0-393-06724-8
- The Ancient Paths: Discovering the Lost Map of Celtic Europe, ISBN 0-330-53150-6; US title: The Discovery of Middle Earth: Mapping the Lost World of the Celts, ISBN 0-393-08163-X
- Cols and Passes of the British Isles (2016), ISBN 978-1846148736
- The Debatable Land: The Lost World Between Scotland and England (2018), ISBN 978-0393285321
- France: An Adventure History. 2022. (Note: Briefly reviewed in the September 5, 2022 issue of The New Yorker, p.59.)

=== Book reviews ===
Year	Review article	Work(s) reviewed
2007	Robb, Graham (June 28, 2007). "In his nightmare city". The New York Review of Books. 54 (11): 52–54.	Vargas Llosa, Mario. The temptation of the impossible : Victor Hugo and Les Misérables. Translated from the Spanish by John King.

———————

== See also ==
- Royal Society of Literature
