= Mark Mazower =

British historian (born 1958)

- Born: Mark A. Mazower; 20 February 1958 (age 68); London, England
- Occupations: Writer, historian

Academic background
- Education: University of Oxford

Academic work
- Era: 20th and 21st century
- Discipline: History
- Institutions: Columbia University; Birkbeck, University of London; University of Sussex; Princeton University
- Notable works: Dark Continent: Europe's Twentieth Century
- Website: www.mazower.com

Mark Mazower (/məˈzaʊ.ər/; born 20 February 1958) is a British historian. His areas of expertise are Greece, the Balkans, and more generally, 20th-century Europe. He is Ira D. Wallach Professor of History at Columbia University in New York City.

== Early life ==
Mazower was born in Golders Green and spent most of his early life in north London. His mother was a physiotherapist and his father worked for Unilever. His great-grandfather was Yiddish author Sholem Asch. During his youth, Mazower enjoyed playing the French horn and composing classical music, as well as reading classical literature and philosophy.

Mazower's father was of Russian Jewish descent. When Mazower began to write his book What You Did Not Tell: A Russian Past and the Journey Home, he discovered that his grandfather, Max, was a member of the Bund, a Jewish socialist party, was involved in revolutionary activities, and helped print illegal books in Yiddish advocating socialism. Max was regularly arrested by the Tsarist police and was imprisoned twice in Siberia, before eventually fleeing the country and settling in England in 1924.

Mazower also discovered that his grandparents continued to socialize with Russian-Jewish revolutionaries in Golders Green. Reflecting on the discovery, Mazower said:

Growing up in Golders Green was a weird experience for me because this place has no history. It was a big revelation to discover that Golders Green in the 1920s was full of these super-important world anarchists, who were hanging out with my grandparents and recovering from the revolution. It suddenly made the whole place make sense.

== Career ==
Mazower received his BA in Classics and Philosophy from the University of Oxford in 1981 and his doctorate from the same university in 1988. He also holds an MA in International Affairs from Johns Hopkins University (1983). Prior to his arrival at Columbia, Mazower taught at Birkbeck, University of London, the University of Sussex and Princeton University.

Mazower has also written for newspapers since 2002 such as the Financial Times and for The Independent contributing articles on international affairs and book reviews.

He has been appointed to the Advisory Board of the European Association of History Educators (EUROCLIO).

He is a member of the Editorial Board for Past & Present.

== Fields of interest ==
Mazower has written extensively on Greek and Balkan history. His book The Balkans won the Wolfson History Prize and Inside Hitler's Greece: The Experience of Occupation, 1941–44, both won the Longman History Today Award for Book of the Year. Salonica, City of Ghosts: Christians, Muslims and Jews 1430–1950 was the Runciman Prize and Duff Cooper Prize winner and was shortlisted for the Hessell-Tiltman Prize.

In addition, Mazower is more broadly concerned with 20th-century European history. His book Dark Continent: Europe's Twentieth Century argued that the triumph of democracy in Europe was not inevitable but rather the result of chance and political agency on the part of citizens, subjects and leaders.

In Hitler's Empire: Nazi Rule in Occupied Europe, Mazower compared Nazi German occupation policy in different European countries.

Mazower's book, No Enchanted Palace, was published in 2009. It narrates the origins of the United Nations and its strict ties to colonialism and its predecessor organisation, the League of Nations. In Governing the World (2012), this narrative is taken one step further, and the history of international organisations in general is evaluated, beginning with the Concert of Europe at the start of the nineteenth century.

Mazower's 2018 inter-generational biography of his own family, What you did not tell, described their lives, education and politics and how it influences his interest in history, place, and the writing of biography. Caroline Moorehead, an acclaimed biographer, on reviewing this book, wrote of his scholarly reconstruction of a family's life meticulously drawn from archives and collections of papers in the UK, Russia, Belgium and Israel and family diaries, letters and interviews. Not simply a biographical narrative, Moorehead explains, since woven into it is a vast and rich picture of left wing European Jewry from the founding of the Bund workers' union. His prodigious historical reach is matched by his affectionate portrait of a family and a people 'whose fight for justice was based on their own personal knowledge of poverty and exploitation.'

== Personal life ==
In his interview with Mazower, John Crace wrote Mazower "likes walking, football, swimming in Hampstead ponds and dislikes commuting and celebrity culture". In 2021, he was awarded an honorary Greek citizenship for "the promotion of Greece, its long history and culture to the international general public."

== Awards and honours ==
- Dido Sotiriou Award of the Hellenic Authors Society, 2012
- Society of Columbia Graduates Great Teacher Award - 2011
- Honorary doctorate from KU Leuven (during the celebrations of the 30th anniversary of the Master of European Studies) - 2019
- Gennadius Prize of the American School of Classical Studies at Athens - 2022

=== Book Awards ===
- The Greek Revolution: Duff Cooper Prize - 2022
- Hitler's Empire: Trilling Award - 2009
- Hitler's Empire: LA Times Book Prize for History - 2009
- Salonica, City of Ghosts: Duff Cooper Prize - 2005
- Salonica, City of Ghosts: John Criticos Prize - 2005
- Salonica, City of Ghosts: Runciman Prize - 2005
- Salonica, City of Ghosts: National Jewish Book Award - 2005
- Dark Continent: German History Book Prize - 2002
- The Balkans: Wolfson Prize for History - 2001
- The Balkans: Adolphe Bentinck Prize - 2001
- Dark Continent: Premio Acqui Storia - 2001

==== Shortlisted for ====
- Governing the World: Hessell-Tiltman Prize - 2013

== Publications ==
Mazower's publications include:

- On Antisemitism: A Word in History (Penguin, 2025) ISBN 978-0593833797
- The Greek Revolution: 1821 and the Making of Modern Europe (Penguin Press, 2021)
- "The Man Who Was France" (review of Julian Jackson, De Gaulle, Belknap Press / Harvard University Press, 2018, 887 pp.), The New York Review of Books, vol. LXVII, no. 1 (16 January 2020), pp. 45–46, 48.
- What You Did Not Tell: A Russian Past and the Journey Home, (Penguin, 2018. ISBN 9780141986845), family memoir
- Governing the World: The History of an Idea (Penguin Group, 13 September 2012. ISBN 978-1-5942-0349-7)
- No Enchanted Palace: The End of Empire and the Ideological Origins of the United Nations (Princeton University Press, Princeton and Oxford 2009. ISBN 978-1-4008-3166-1)
- Hitler's Empire: Nazi Rule in Occupied Europe (Allen Lane, 2008)
- Networks of Power in Modern Greece, (as editor, C Hurst & Co Publishers Ltd, 2008)
- Salonica, City of Ghosts: Christians, Muslims and Jews, 1430–1950 (HarperCollins, 2004)
- Ideologies and National Identities: The Case of Twentieth-Century South-Eastern Europe (as co-editor, Central European University Press, 2003)
- After the War was Over: Reconstructing the Family, Nation and State in Greece, 1943–1960 (as an editor, Princeton UP, 2000)
- The Balkans (Weidenfeld and Nicolson, 2000) from the 'Universal History' series, reprinted as The Balkans: From the End of Byzantium to the Present Day (Phoenix, 2002)
- Dark Continent: Europe's Twentieth Century (Knopf, 1998)
- The Policing of Politics in the Twentieth Century: Historical Perspectives (as editor, Berghahn, 1997)
- Inside Hitler's Greece: The Experience of Occupation, 1941–44 (Yale UP, 1993)
- Greece and the Inter-War Economic Crisis, Clarendon Press, 1991 (first published 1989), ISBN 0-19-820205-9, also translated in Greek by MIET (2002).
