= Nick Salvatore =

American historian (1943–2025)

- Born: Nicholas Anthony Salvatore; 1943; New York City, New York, U.S.
- Died: November 29, 2025 (aged 82); Ithaca, NY
- Title: Maurice and Hinda Neufeld Founders Professor of Industrial and Labor Relations
- Spouse: Ann Sullivan

Academic background
- Education: Hunter College (BA); University of California, Berkeley (MA, PhD)
- Thesis: A Generation in Transition (1977)
- Academic advisor: Leon F. Litwack

Academic work
- Discipline: American studies; history; industrial relations
- Institutions: College of the Holy Cross; Cornell University

Nicholas Anthony Salvatore (1943–2025) was an American historian who served as the Maurice and Hinda Neufeld Founders Professor of Industrial and Labor Relations and Professor of American Studies at Cornell University.

== Biography ==
Salvatore was born in 1943 in the New York City borough of Brooklyn, one of three children born to Nicholas and Katherine Salvatore. Salvatore's father died in 1945. Salvatore attended St. Savior's parochial school followed by Brooklyn Prep High School. Salvatore attended Saint Andrew-On-Hudson seminary for a year, before going to Fordham University and dropping out before working for the Railway Express Agency. During this time, Salvatore "became active in the Civil Rights and Vietnam Anti-War movements" and worked "to organize against a system he had come to understand as unjust and inhumane".

Salvatore graduated from Hunter College in 1968, and graduated from the University of California, Berkeley, with an MA and PhD, where he studied with Leon F. Litwack.

In 1976, Salvatore started teaching American history at the College of the Holy Cross, where he "earned a reputation as a demanding, impassioned, charismatic lecturer". In 1981, Salvatore began working at the New York State School of Industrial Relations at Cornell University. Salvatore was a visiting lecturer at universities in Turin and Paris, and also spent one year at the Divinity School at Yale University.

=== Personal life ===
Salvatore had two daughters, Gabriella and Nora, and two grandsons, Joseph and Oscar. Salvatore lived with his wife, Ann Sullivan, in Ithaca, New York. Salvatore suffered with Alzheimer's disease in his later years. He died on 29 November 2025. In an obituary published in The Ithaca Voice, Salvatore was described as someone who "loved life and never took its magic for granted. Julie Greco wrote that Salvatore was a "lifelong champion for working people".

== Awards ==
- National Endowment for the Humanities fellowships
- Senior Fellow in Residence at the Institute for the Advanced Study of Religion at Yale University.
- Bancroft Prize, for Eugene V. Debs: Citizen and Socialist
- John H. Dunning Prize, for Eugene V. Debs: Citizen and Socialist
- New England History Association's Outstanding Book Prize, for We All Got History

== Works ==
- Salvatore, Nick (1982). Eugene V. Debs: Citizen and Socialist. University of Illinois Press. ISBN 978-0-252-01148-1.
- We All Got History: The Memory Books of Amos Webber. Times Books. 1996. ISBN 978-0-8129-2681-1.
- Singing in a Strange Land: Rev. C. L. Franklin, the Black Church, and the Transformation of America. Little, Brown and Company. 2005. ISBN 978-0-316-16037-7.
- "Biography and Social History : an Intimate Relationship", Labour History, November 2008

=== Edited ===
- Faith and the Historian: Catholic Perspectives. University of Illinois Press. 2007. ISBN 978-0-252-07382-3.
- Richard Schneirov; Shelton Stromquist; Nick Salvatore, eds. (1999). The Pullman Strike and the crisis of the 1890s: essays on labor and politics. University of Illinois Press. ISBN 978-0-252-06755-6.

Awards
| Preceded by Edward Countryman | Bancroft Prize; 1983; With: John Putnam Demos | Succeeded by Louis R. Harlan |
| Preceded by Mary P. Ryan | Bancroft Prize; 1983; With: John Putnam Demos | Succeeded by Paul Starr |
