= Independence Lost =

2015 nonfiction book by historian Kathleen DuVal

Independence Lost: Lives on the Edge of the American Revolution
- Author: Kathleen DuVal
- Publisher: Random House
- Publication date: July 7, 2015
- Pages: 464
- ISBN: 9780812981209
- Dewey Decimal: 973.3

Independence Lost: Lives on the Edge of the American Revolution is a 2015 nonfiction book by American historian Kathleen DuVal. Focusing on the effects of the American Revolution on the frontiers of Spanish Louisiana and British West Florida, Independence Lost incorporates biographies of eight individual historical figures alongside more general analysis of the Gulf Coast during the 18th and early 19th centuries. While the first part of the book serves as introductions for each of the historical figures featured throughout the work, later parts thread together each individual's story. The narrative details the Spanish entrance into the war against Great Britain, culminating in the Siege of Pensacola and the Spanish annexation of Florida in the Treaty of Paris.

Academic reviews of the book were positive, praising DuVal's focus on a region typically ignored by histories of the Revolution, alongside the work's character narratives and vivid description of period warfare. Criticism generally focused on DuVal's historiographical embrace of Continental history as a school of thought more generally.

== Background ==
Kathleen DuVal is a professor of early American history at University of North Carolina, Chapel Hill, with a primary focus on the societal positions and interactions of men and women from different racial backgrounds during the history of the broader colonial period and early United States. Her first book, The Native Ground, is a broad colonial history of the Arkansas River basin, with a focus on the interactions between native nations and various colonial powers. Her 2009 follow-up work, Interpreting a Continent, has a similar theme, drawing on a range of colonial North American sources from different historical backgrounds, in the form of a compilation of historical documents from various eras and nationalities.

The historiography of the American Revolution and American studies more broadly underwent a "transnational turn" beginning in the 1990s and continuing into the 2020s, shifting the study of the United States' social and political history to its place within a broader international context. A historiographical school drawing from the transnational turn, Continental history forms a dominant focus of DuVal's work, as well as the work of her mentor Alan Taylor. Both incorporate a range of historical Spanish and Native American perspectives to broaden the focus from British North America, which had been the intense focus of other schools of thought. This approach drew comparison to far older Imperial school historiography, with its focus on the European settlement and colonization of North America, combined with the modern critical theory focus on race and subaltern populations.

== Synopsis ==
Independence Lost presents a history of the peripheral areas of North America along the Gulf Coast contemporary to the American Revolution, then comprising Spanish Louisiana and the British colonies of East and West Florida, mainly retelling the British defeat in the region during the Spanish reconquest of Florida. A core focus of the work is dismantling the conceptualization of Loyalist and Patriot support as an ideological struggle. Writing in the introduction, DuVal notes that "most people chose sides for reasons besides genuine revolutionary or loyalist fervor".

=== Structure ===
Following a short introduction detailing the social and geopolitical environment of the Gulf Coast during the period, the structure of the book threads between biographical explorations of eight historical figures from the region.

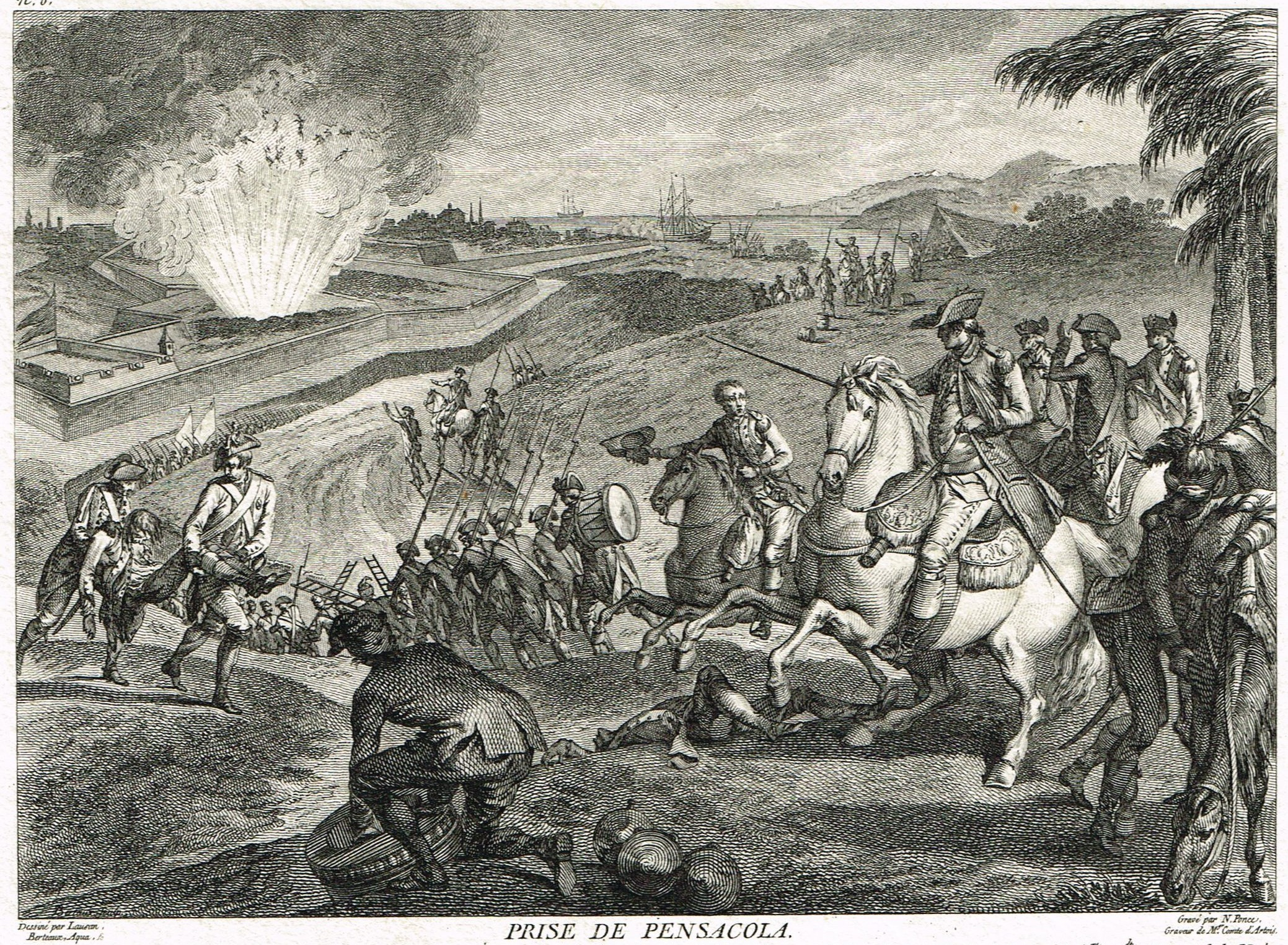
The Spanish conquest of Pensacola serves as the climax of the book's third part.

Alongside another chapter expanding on the recent geopolitics, Part I ("The Place and Its People") branches into separate introductions to each of the main "characters" of the book, although married couples are covered at once – Oliver Pollock with Margaret O'Brien, as well as James Bruce with Isabella Chrystie. It mainly covers their activities prior to the revolution, with a focus on the 1760s and early 1770s, up to the outbreak of the Revolutionary War.

Parts II, III, and IV each advance forward in time through the revolutionary era, incorporating various regional and personal perspectives, and frequent returns to the character narratives covered in Part I. Part II ("What to Do About This War?") covers the period between 1777 and the Spanish declaration of war on Great Britain in June 1779, with three chapters focused on the Creek and Chickasaw, British territories, and Spanish territories respectively. Part III ("The Revolutionary War") takes place over the Gulf Coast campaign and the height of Spanish conflict with British forces in North America, culminating in the 1781 Siege of Pensacola. Part IV concludes with regional developments over the 1780s, including the effects of American and Spanish rule in the area granted by the Treaty of Paris. A conclusion chapter serves as an epilogue, describing the achievement and effects of American hegemony along the Gulf Coast through the Louisiana Purchase and the War of 1812.

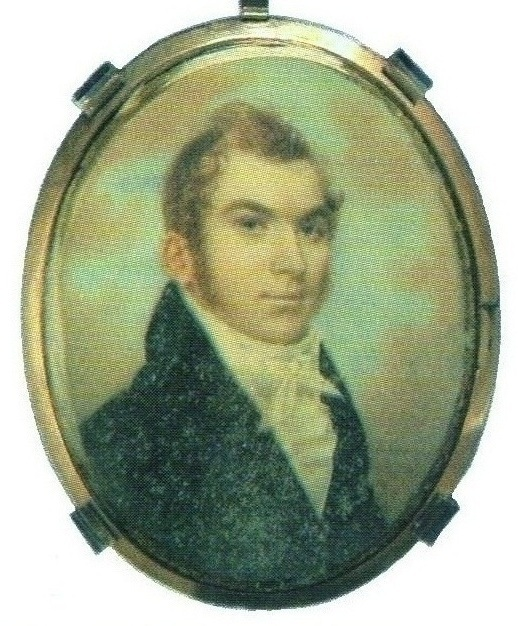
Miniature of Alexander McGillivray

=== Character narratives ===
Eight historical figures, introduced by DuVal as the book's "characters", are detailed throughout the text. In order of introduction:

- Payamataha, a Chickasaw warrior and chieftain. He negotiated a longstanding peace with the British, although offered little in the way of military support despite overtures of military alliance. He positioned the Chickasaw as friendly to both Spanish and British forces, and was ultimately able to keep the nation out of the war through a policy of neutrality.
- Alexander McGillivray, a mixed-race Muscogee Creek leader who fought alongside the British, ultimately negotiating for Creek sovereignty with both Spain and the United States following the Treaty of Paris.
- Oliver Pollock and Margaret O'Brien, wealthy New Orleans merchants who financed the American revolutionaries and urged Spanish support, ultimately accruing massive debts due to Congressional delay of interest payments.
- James Bruce and Isabella Chrystie, prominent British loyalists and slaveholders in West Florida. They survived the Siege of Pensacola, but lost their wealth and properties in the Spanish annexation of the region, returning to Britain before possibly returning to other British colonies in North America.
- Petit Jean, a slave from French Louisiana, later enslaved as a cattle driver by a British master in Mobile. He served as a spy for the Spanish during the war, ultimately earning freedom for himself and his wife.
- Amand Broussard, a survivor of the Expulsion of the Acadians who settled in Louisiana as a child, ultimately becoming a successful cattle rancher in Attakapas. He fought alongside the Spanish during the Revolutionary War, before later serving under Andrew Jackson during the War of 1812.

== Reception ==
Academic reviewers praised the book's focus on the Gulf Coast region, moving away from traditional American Revolution histories' exclusive focus on the Thirteen Colonies themselves, while also connecting the region to the broader political and social environment of North America, especially to the relatively obscurity of the 18th century Gulf Coast. DuVal's emphasis on Native American groups to Revolution-era North America was also emphasized. Historian James F. Brooks favorably described DuVal's use of "kaleidoscopic narrative" in the diversity of biographical vignettes to present a varied view of the Revolutionary era, specifically praising the parallels drawn by DuVal between the evolution of Native American confederacies and the transformation of the United States into a unified state during the Confederation period. DuVal's narrative abilities received praise, particularly in her abilities to develop the historical characters analyzed in the book, her ability to unite the individual biographies into a single narrative, as well as in her vivid descriptions of battles and warfare. The New Yorker described the book as an "intrepid history", with praise for its expansive detail echoed by the Library Journal and The Journal of American History. The book's extensive use of primary materials has been noted as particularly admirable.

Perhaps the greatest underlying unity may be that these approaches are based on the premise that there is a need to keep debunking the story you learned from your high school textbook about the Revolution and America’s post-revolutionary expansion if you are over the age of 45.

— Brendan McConville, Journal of the Early Republic, 2019

The book drew scholarly comparison to Alan Taylor's 2016 American Revolutions due to their shared focus on transnational and Continental history, albeit with Independence Lost taking a narrower geographical scope. Continental history has been critiqued for its broadness and ill-defined motivations and form, with historian Brendan McConville describing the school as comprising "at least five types", ranging from focuses on the border regions effects on the Thirteen Colonies and the Revolution, to centering geographical and biological factors across the North American continent.

Woody Holton, reviewing the book in The New York Times and later the Journal of the Early Republic, praised the book's consideration of counterfactuals and alternate contingencies, but described DuVal's lack of demographic analysis as inadvertently reinforcing the frontier mythos of a "rugged pioneer outsmarting and out-fighting the Injun", as well as a tendency for the narrative to retread events already covered. Taylor and DuVal's works in Continental history were critiqued as continuing their criticism of the already long-discredited narrative of the American Revolution and westward expansion as heroic and positive transformations. In contrast, Mark G. Spencer, writing for The Wall Street Journal, stated that Independence Lost was most useful to those already quite familiar with the history of the Revolution, cautioning that "the uninitiated may come away thinking that books and reading and high-level political thought were absent from the American Revolution."
