= Dawley (surname) =

Dawley is a surname. Notable people with the surname include:

- Alan Dawley, American professor
- Bill Dawley, American baseball player
- Ernest J. Dawley
- Fred Dawley, American football player
- Garth Dawley
- J. Searle Dawley
- Joey Dawley, American baseball player
