= INAS =

INAS, InAs of Inas may refer to:

- Inas X, an American musician from New York City, New York, United States
- Indian Naval Air Squadron, a flying unit of the Indian Naval Air Arm
- Indian Naval Armament Service, part of the Indian Engineering Services exam conducted by UPSC.
- Indium arsenide, a semiconductor
- Institute of Native American Studies, at the University of Georgia, Athens, Georgia, United States
- International Near-Earth Asteroid Survey
- International Sports Federation for Persons with Intellectual Disability
- École Nationale des Beaux Arts (Senegal), formerly Institut National des Arts du Sénégal, or INAS, in Dakar, Senegal
