= Claudio Saunt =

American historian

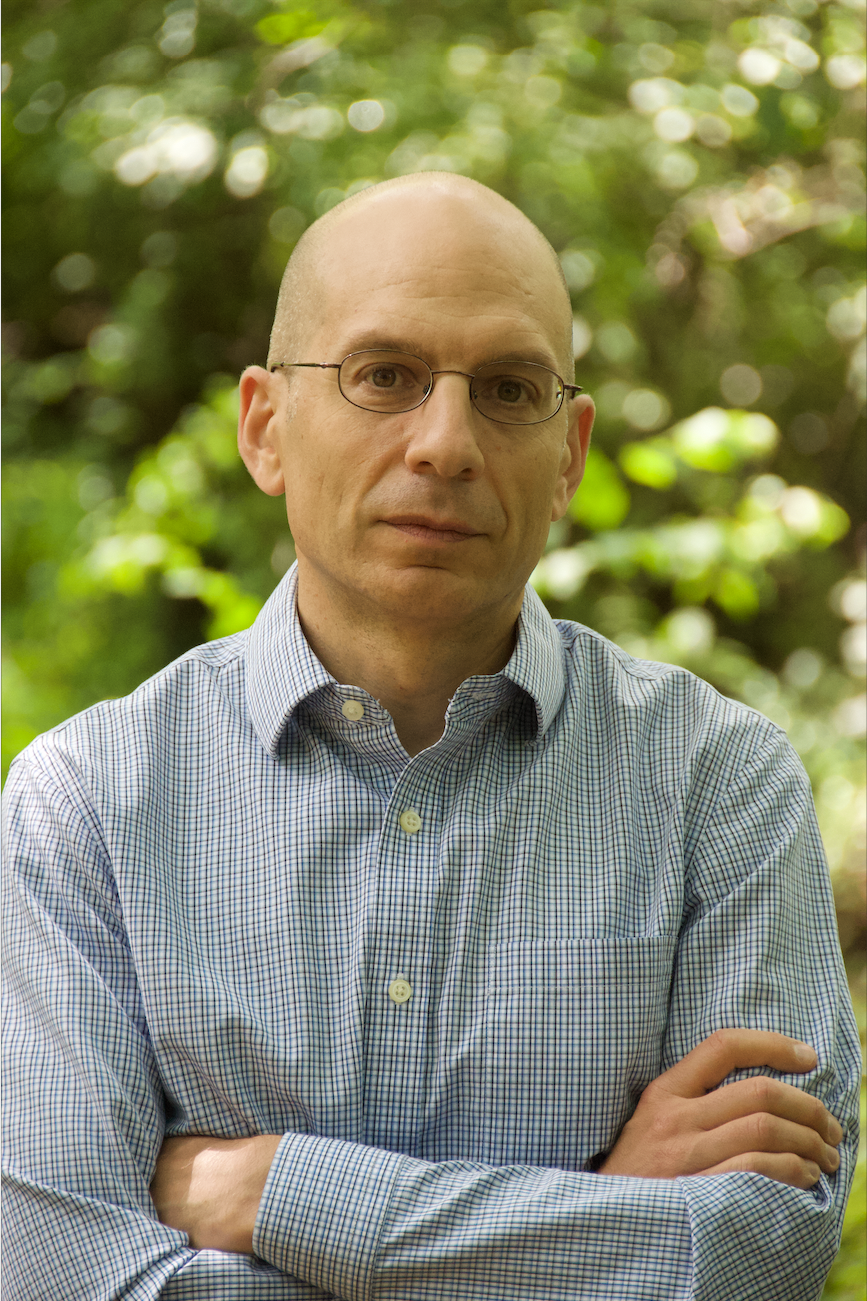
- Saunt in 2020
- Born: San Francisco, California
- Education: Columbia University (BA); Duke University (MA, PhD)
- Occupation: historian

Claudio Saunt (born 1967) is a professor, author, and historian of early America, the U.S. South, and Native American studies. Saunt is the prize-winning author of Unworthy Republic: The Dispossession of Native Americans and the Road to Indian Territory (2020), West of the Revolution: An Uncommon History of 1776 (2014), Black, White, and Indian: Race and the Unmaking of an American Family (2005), A New Order of Things: Property, Power, and the Transformation of the Creek Indians, 1733–1816 (1999). Saunt received his Ph.D. in Early America from Duke University in 1996 and presently works as a Richard B. Russell Professor in American History at the University of Georgia, Athens. Saunt is also Co-Director of the Center for Virtual History and Associate Director of the Institute of Native American Studies. He was named a Guggenheim Fellow in 2022.

== Education and career ==
Born in San Francisco, Saunt graduated from Columbia University in 1989 with a Bachelor of Arts degree in history and received his Master of Arts in American history from Duke University in 1991. In 1996, Saunt completed his Ph.D. in early America at Duke. Saunt briefly worked as an instructor and lecturer at Duke and Columbia, respectively, before beginning work as a professor at the University of Georgia in 1998. Presently, Saunt is a Richard B. Russell Professor in American History at the University of Georgia, Athens. Saunt additionally serves as the associate director of the Institute of Native American Studies, a program which offers students the opportunity to receive certificates in Native American Studies alongside their officially declared field of study. As the co-founder and co-director of the Center for Virtual History, Saunt leads initiatives focused on the intersection of research, emerging technologies, and the public.

== Published works ==
Saunt is the author of multiple prize-winning books and articles.

Saunt's first monograph, A New Order of Things: Property, Power, and the Transformation of the Creek Indians, 1733–1816 (1999), documents the eighteenth-century transformation of the Deep South sparked by the Creek Indians' accumulation of cattle and slaves. A New Order of Things was the 2000 winner of the Southern Historical Association's Charles S. Snydor Award for best book on Southern history and of the American Society for Ethnohistory's Wheeler-Voegelin Award for best book in ethnohistory.

Black, White, and Indian: Race and the Unmaking of an American Family, Saunt's 2005 text, explores the impact of racial hierarchy on eighteenth-century mixed-race families in the Native American South. Black, White, and Indian received the Clements Prize in 2005 from Southern Methodist University's Clements Center for Southwest Studies for best non-fiction book on Southwestern America.

Saunt's book West of the Revolution: An Uncommon History of 1776 (2014) reveals the multiple histories of Native American revolutionary actions which took place in the same year as many well-known moments in American Revolution history.

In Unworthy Republic: The Dispossession of Native Americans and the Road to Indian Territory (2020), Saunt provides a multilayered account of the expulsions of Native Americans from their homes in the eastern United States to territories west of the Mississippi, under the Indian Removal Act of 1830, which was signed into law by U.S. president Andrew Jackson. It received the 2021 Robert F. Kennedy Book Award and the 2021 Bancroft Prize. Unworthy Republic was a finalist for the 2020 National Book Award for Nonfiction. Saunt is also the creator of "The Invasion of America", an interactive map that documents every Native American land cession between the founding of the Republic and the 1880s, with links to corresponding treaties and executive orders.

== List of selected works ==
=== Books ===
- A New Order of Things: Property, Power, and the Transformation of the Creek Indians, 1733–1816. New Orleans: Cambridge University Press, 1999.
- Black, White, and Indian: Race and the Unmaking of an American Family. Oxford: Oxford University Press, 2006. ISBN 978-0195313109
- West of the Revolution: An Uncommon History of 1776. New York: W. W. Norton and Co., 2014. ISBN 978-0393240207.
- Unworthy Republic: The Dispossession of Native Americans and the Road to Indian Territory. New York: W. W. Norton & Co, 2020. ISBN 9780393609851.

=== Articles ===
- "The Paradox of Freedom: Tribal Sovereignty and Emancipation During the Reconstruction of Indian Territory," Journal of Southern History (Feb. 2004).
- "Telling Stories: The Political Uses of Myth and History in the Cherokee and Creek Nations", Journal of American History (Dec. 2006).
- "Go West: Mapping Early American Historiography," William and Mary Quarterly (Oct. 2008).
- "'My Medicine is Punishment': A Case of Torture in Early California, 1775–1776," Ethnohistory, vol. 57 (2010): 679–708.
- "The Age of Imperial Expansion," The Oxford Handbook of American Indian History, ed. Frederick Hoxie (Oxford University Press, 2016), 77-92.
- "Financing Dispossession: Stocks, Bonds, and the Deportation of Native Peoples in the Antebellum United States," The Journal of American History, 106 (Sept. 2019): 315-37.
