= Bancroft Prize =

Annual American book award

The Bancroft Prize is awarded each year by the trustees of Columbia University for books about diplomacy or the history of the Americas.

It was established in 1948, with a bequest from Frederic Bancroft, in his memory and that of his brother, diplomat and attorney, Edgar Addison Bancroft.

The Bancroft Prize has been generally considered to be among the most prestigious awards in the field of American history writing. It comes with a $10,000 stipend (raised from $4,000 beginning in 2004). Seventeen winners had their work supported by the National Endowment for the Humanities, and 16 winners were also recipients of the Pulitzer Prize for History.

Following independent investigations, the Bancroft Prize was rescinded from Michael A. Bellesiles after he had received it in 2000.

== Winners of the Bancroft Prize ==
Year	Book
1948	Nevins, Allan. Ordeal of the Union. New York : Charles Scribner and Sons, 1947.
1948	DeVoto, Bernard. Across the Wide Missouri. New York : Houghton Mifflin, 1947.
1949	Sherwood, Robert E. Roosevelt and Hopkins. New York : Harper & Brothers, 1948.
1949	Morison, Samuel E. The Rising Sun in the Pacific. New York : Little, Brown, 1948.
1950	Gipson, Lawrence H. The Victorious Year, 1758–1760. New York : Alfred A. Knopf, 1949. Vol. VII of The Great War for Empire.
1950	Bolton, Herbert E. Coronado. Whittlesey House and the University of New Mexico Press, 1949.
1951	Holcombe, Arthur N. Our More Perfect Union. Cambridge, Massachusetts : Harvard University Press, 1950.
1951	Smith, Henry N. Virgin Land. Cambridge, Massachusetts : Harvard University Press, 1950.
1952	Pusey, Merlo J. Charles Evans Hughes. New York : Macmillan, 1951.
1952	Woodward, C. Vann. Origins of the New South, 1877–1913. Baton Rouge, LA : Louisiana State University Press, 1951.
1953	Dangerfield, George. The Era of Good Feelings. New York : Harcourt, Brace, 1952.
1953	Goldman, Eric F. Rendezvous with Destiny. New York : Alfred A. Knopf, 1952.
1954	Rossiter, Clinton. Seedtime of the Republic. New York : Harcourt, Brace, 1953.
1954	Langer, William L. and S. Everett Gleason. The Undeclared War. New York : Harper & Bros., 1953.
1955	Horgan, Paul. Great River: The Rio Grande in North American History. Rinehart, 1954.
1955	White, Leonard D. The Jacksonians. New York : Macmillan, 1954.
1956	Stevenson, Elizabeth. Henry Adams. New York : Macmillan, 1955.
1956	Randall, J. G. and Richard N. Current. Last Full Measure: Lincoln the President. New York : Dodd, Mead, 1955.
1957	Kennan, George F. Russia Leaves the War. Princeton, NJ : Princeton University Press, 1956.
1957	Link, Arthur S. Wilson: The New Freedom. Princeton, NJ : Princeton University Press, 1956.
1958	Schlesinger, Arthur M., Jr. The Crisis of the Old Order. New York : Houghton Mifflin, 1957.
1958	Mott, Frank Luther. A History of American Magazines. Vol. 4. Cambridge, Massachusetts : The Belknap Press of Harvard University Press, 1957.
1959	Samuels, Ernest. Henry Adams, The Middle Years. Cambridge, Massachusetts : The Belknap Press of Harvard University Press, 1958.
1959	Boorstin, Daniel J. The Americans: The Colonial Experience. New York : Random House, 1958.
1960	Palmer, R. R. The Age of the Democratic Revolution: A Political History of Europe and America, 1760–1800. Princeton, NJ : Princeton University Press, 1959.
1960	Leech, Margaret. In the Days of McKinley. New York : Harper & Bros., 1959.
1961	Peterson, Merrill D. The Jefferson Image in the American Mind. Oxford, Eng. : Oxford University Press, 1960.
1961	Link, Arthur S. Wilson: The Struggle for Neutrality, 1914–1915. Princeton, NJ : Princeton University Press, 1960.
1962	Cremin, Lawrence A. The Transformation of the School. New York : Alfred A. Knopf, 1961.
1962	Gilbert, Felix To the Farewell Address: Ideas of Early American Foreign Policy. Princeton, NJ : Princeton University Press, 1961.
1962	Duberman, Martin B. Charles Francis Adams, 1807–1866. New York : Houghton Mifflin, 1961.
1963	Smith, Page. John Adams. New York : Doubleday, 1962.
1963	Wohlstetter, Roberta. Pearl Harbor: Warning and Decision. Palo Alto, CA : Stanford University Press, 1962.
1963	Stoessinger, John G. The Might of Nations: World Politics in Our Time. New York : Random House, 1962.
1964	Leuchtenburg, William E. Franklin D. Roosevelt and the New Deal, 1932–1940. New York : Harper & Row, 1963.
1964	Thomas, John L. The Liberator: William Lloyd Garrison. New York : Little, Brown, 1963.
1964	Seabury, Paul. Power, Freedom, and Diplomacy: The Foreign Policy of the United States of America. New York : Random House, 1963.
1965	Perkins, Bradford. Castlereagh and Adams: England and the United States, 1812–1823. Berkeley, CA : University of California Press, 1964.
1965	Willcox, William B. Portrait of a General: Sir Henry Clinton in the War of Independence. New York : Alfred A. Knopf, 1964.
1965	Borg, Dorothy. The United States and the Far Eastern Crisis of 1933–1938. Cambridge, Massachusetts : Harvard University Press, 1964.
1966	Morris, Richard B. The Peacemakers: The Great Powers and American Independence. New York : Harper & Row, 1965.
1966	Friend, Theodore W., III. Between Two Empires: The Ordeal of the Philippines, 1929–1946. New Haven, CT : Yale University Press, 1965.
1967	Freehling, William W. Prelude to Civil War: The Nullification Controversy in South Carolina, 1816–1836. New York : Harper & Row, 1966.
1967	Sellers, Charles Grier. James K. Polk, Continentalist, 1843–1846. Vol. II. Princeton, NJ : Princeton University Press, 1966.
1967	Young, James Sterling. The Washington Community, 1800–1828. Princeton, NJ : Princeton University Press, 1966.
1968	Bullock, Henry Allen. A History of Negro Education in the South from 1619 to the Present. Cambridge, Massachusetts : Harvard University Press, 1967.
1968	Bushman, Richard L. From Puritan to Yankee: Character and Social Order in Connecticut, 1690–1765. Cambridge, Massachusetts : Harvard University Press, 1967.
1968	Bailyn, Bernard. The Ideological Origins of the American Revolution. Cambridge, Massachusetts : The Belknap Press of Harvard University Press, 1967.
1969	Jordan, Winthrop D. White over Black: American Attitudes Toward the Negro, 1550–1812. Chapel Hill, NC : University of North Carolina Press for the Institute of Early American History and Culture, 1968.
1969	Levin, N. Gordon, Jr. Woodrow Wilson and World Politics: America's Response to War and Revolution. Oxford, Eng. : Oxford University Press, 1968.
1969	Tugwell, Rexford Guy. The Brains Trust. New York : The Viking Press, 1968.
1970	Sellers, Charles Coleman. Charles Willson Peale. New York : Charles Scribner's Sons, 1969.
1970	Wood, Gordon S. The Creation of the American Republic, 1776–1787. Chapel Hill, NC : University of North Carolina Press for the Institute of Early American History and Culture, 1969.
1970	Carter, Dan T. Scottsboro: A Tragedy of the American South. Baton Rouge, LA : Louisiana State University Press, 1969.
1971	Barnouw, Erik. The Image Empire: A History of Broadcasting in the United States from 1953. Vol. III. Oxford, Eng. : Oxford University Press, 1970.
1971	Kennedy, David M. Birth Control in America: The Career of Margaret Sanger. New Haven, CT : Yale University Press, 1970.
1971	Wall, Joseph Frazier. Andrew Carnegie. Oxford, Eng. : Oxford University Press, 1970.
1972	Degler, Carl N. Neither Black Nor White. New York : Macmillan, 1971.
1972	Middlekauff, Robert. The Mathers: Three Generations of Puritan Intellectuals, 1596–1728. Oxford, Eng. : Oxford University Press, 1971.
1972	Morison, Samuel E. The European Discovery of America: The Northern Voyages. Oxford, Eng. : Oxford University Press, 1971.
1973	FitzGerald, Frances. Fire in the Lake: The Vietnamese and the Americans in Vietnam. Boston : Atlantic, Little, Brown, 1972.
1973	Gaddis, John Lewis. The United States and the Origins of the Cold War. New York : Columbia University Press, 1972.
1973	Harlan, Louis R. Booker T. Washington. Oxford, Eng. : Oxford University Press, 1972.
1974	Billington, Ray Allen. Frederick Jackson Turner: Historian, Scholar, Teacher. Oxford, Eng. : Oxford University Press, 1973.
1974	Hoopes, Townsend. The Devil and John Foster Dulles. Boston : Atlantic, Little, Brown, 1973.
1974	Thernstrom, Stephan. The Other Bostonians: Poverty and Progress in the American Metropolis, 1880–1970. Cambridge, Massachusetts : Harvard University Press, 1973.
1975	Fogel, Robert William and Stanley L. Engerman. Time on the Cross: The Economics of American Negro Slavery and Time on the Cross: Evidence and Methods. Boston : Atlantic, Little, Brown, 1974.
1975	George, Alexander L. and Richard Smoke. Deterrence in American Foreign Policy: Theory and Practice. New York : Columbia University Press, 1974.
1975	Genovese, Eugene. Roll, Jordan, Roll: The World the Slaves Made. New York : Pantheon, 1974.
1976	Davis, David Brion. The Problem of Slavery in the Age of Revolution, 1770–1823. Ithaca, NY : Cornell University Press, 1975.
1976	Lewis, R. W. B. Edith Wharton: A Biography. New York : Harper & Row, 1975.
1977	Dawley, Alan. Class and Community: The Industrial Revolution in Lynn. Cambridge, Massachusetts : Harvard University Press, 1976.
1977	Gross, Robert A. The Minutemen and Their World. New York : Hill and Wang, 1976.
1977	Higman, Barry W. Slave Population and Economy in Jamaica, 1807–1834. Cambridge, Eng. : Cambridge University Press, 1976.
1978	Chandler, Alfred D., Jr. The Visible Hand: The Managerial Revolution in American Business. Cambridge, Massachusetts : Harvard University Press, 1977.
1978	Horwitz, Morton J. The Transformation of American Law, 1780–1860. Cambridge, Massachusetts : Harvard University Press, 1977.
1979	Thorne, Christopher. Allies of a Kind: The United States, Britain, and the War Against Japan, 1941–1945. Oxford, Eng. : Oxford University Press, 1978.
1979	Wallace, Anthony F. C. Rockdale: The Growth of An American Village in the Early Industrial Revolution. New York : Alfred Knopf, 1978.
1980	Dallek, Robert. Franklin D. Roosevelt and American Foreign Policy, 1932–1945. Oxford, Eng. : Oxford University Press, 1979.
1980	Dublin, Thomas. Women at Work: The Transformation of Work and Community in Lowell, Massachusetts, 1826–1860. New York : Columbia University Press, 1979.
1980	Worster, Donald. Dust Bowl: The Southern Plains in the 1930s. Oxford, Eng. : Oxford University Press, 1979.
1981	Steel, Ronald. Walter Lipmann and the American Century. New York : Little, Brown, 1980.
1981	Strouse, Jean. Alice James: A Biography. New York : Houghton Mifflin, 1980.
1982	Countryman, Edward. A People in Revolution: The American Revolution and Political Society in New York, 1760–1790. Baltimore, MD : The Johns Hopkins University Press, 1981.
1982	Ryan, Mary P. Cradle of the Middle Class: The Family in Oneida County, New York, 1790–1865. Cambridge, Eng. : Cambridge University Press, 1981.
1983	Demos, John Putnam. Entertaining Satan: Witchcraft and the Culture of Early New England. Oxford, Eng. : Oxford University Press, 1982.
1983	Salvatore, Nick. Eugene V. Debs: Citizen and Socialist. Champaign, IL : University of Illinois Press, 1982.
1984	Harlan, Louis R. Booker T. Washington: The Wizard of Tuskegee, 1901–1915. Oxford, Eng. : Oxford University Press, 1982.
1984	Starr, Paul. The Social Transformation of American Medicine: The Rise of a Sovereign Profession and the Making of a Vast Industry. New York : Basic Books, 1983.
1985	Lebsock, Suzanne. The Free Women of Petersburg: Status and Culture in a Southern Town, 1784–1860. New York : Norton, 1984.
1985	Silverman, Kenneth. The Life and Times of Cotton Mather. New York : Harper & Row, 1984.
1986	Jackson, Kenneth T. Crabgrass Frontier: The Suburbanization of the United States. Oxford, Eng. : Oxford University Press, 1985.
1986	Jones, Jacqueline. Labor of Love, Labor of Sorrow: Black Women, Work, and the Family from Slavery to the Present. New York : Basic Books, 1985.
1987	Doerflinger, Thomas. A Vigorous Spirit of Enterprise: Merchants and Economic Development in Revolutionary Philadelphia. Chapel Hill, NC : University of North Carolina Press for the Institute of Early American History and Culture, 1986.
1987	Lane, Roger. Roots of Violence in Black Philadelphia, 1860–1900. Cambridge, Massachusetts : Harvard University Press, 1986.
1988	Sherry, Michael S. The Rise of American Air Power: The Creation of Armageddon. New Haven, CT : Yale University Press, 1987.
1988	Kolchin, Peter. Unfree Labor: American Slavery and Russian Serfdom. Cambridge, Massachusetts : Harvard University Press, 1987.
1989	Foner, Eric. Reconstruction: America's Unfinished Revolution, 1863–1877. New York : Harper & Row, 1988.
1989	Morgan, Edmund S. Inventing the People: The Rise of Popular Sovereignty in England and America. New York : W. W. Norton, 1988.
1990	Merrell, James H. The Indians' New World: Catawbas and Their Neighbors from European Contact through the Era of Removal. Chapel Hill, NC : University of North Carolina Press for the Institute of Early American History and Culture, 1989.
1990	McMillen, Neil R. Dark Journey: Black Mississippians in the Age of Jim Crow. Champaign, IL : University of Illinois Press, 1989.
1991	Cohen, Lizabeth. Making a New Deal: Industrial Workers in Chicago, 1919–1939. Cambridge, Eng. : Cambridge University Press, 1990.
1991	Ulrich, Laurel Thatcher. A Midwife's Tale: The Life of Martha Ballard, Based on Her Diary, 1785–1812. New York : Alfred A. Knopf, 1990.
1992	Cronon, William. Nature's Metropolis: Chicago and the Great West. New York : W. W. Norton, 1991.
1992	Royster, Charles. The Destructive War: William Tecumseh Sherman, Stonewall Jackson, and the Americans. New York : Alfred A. Knopf, 1991.
1993	Capper, Charles. The Private Years. Oxford, Eng. : Oxford University Press, 1992. Vol. 1 of Margaret Fuller: An American Romantic Life.
1993	Leffler, Melvyn P. A Preponderance of Power: National Security, the Truman Administration, and the Cold War. Palo Alto, CA : Stanford University Press, 1992.
1994	Elkins, Stanley and Eric McKitrick. The Age of Federalism: The Early American Republic, 1788–1800. Oxford, Eng. : Oxford University Press, 1993.
1994	Jordan, Winthrop D. Tumult and Silence at Second Creek: An Inquiry into a Civil War Slave Conspiracy. Baton Rouge, LA : Louisiana State University Press, 1993.
1994	Lewis, David Levering. W. E. B. Du Bois: Biography of a Race, 1868–1919. New York : Henry Holt, 1993.
1995	Brooke, John L. The Refiner's Fire: The Making of Mormon Cosmology, 1644–1844. Cambridge, Eng. : Cambridge University Press, 1994.
1995	Dittmer, John. Local People: The Struggle for Civil Rights in Mississippi. Champaign, IL : University of Illinois Press, 1994.
1996	Taylor, Alan. William Cooper's Town: Power and Persuasion on the Frontier of the Early American Republic. New York : Alfred A. Knopf, 1995.
1996	Reynolds, David S. Walt Whitman's America: A Cultural Biography. New York : Alfred A. Knopf, 1995.
1997	Kyvig, David E. Explicit and Authentic Acts: Amending the U.S. Constitution, 1776–1995. Lawrence, KS : University of Kansas Press, 1996.
1997	Patterson, James T. Grand Expectations: The United States, 1945–1974. Oxford, Eng. : Oxford University Press, 1996.
1998	Heyrman, Christine Leigh. Southern Cross: The Beginnings of the Bible Belt. New York : Alfred A. Knopf, 1997.
1998	LaFeber, Walter. The Clash: A History of U.S.-Japan Relations. New York : W. W. Norton, 1997.
1998	Sugrue, Thomas J. The Origins of the Urban Crisis: Race and Inequality in Postwar Detroit. Princeton, NJ : Princeton University Press, 1997.
1999	Berlin, Ira. Many Thousands Gone: The First Two Centuries of Slavery in North America. Cambridge, Massachusetts : Harvard University Press, 1998.
1999	Morgan, Philip D. Slave Counterpoint: Black Culture in Eighteenth-Century Chesapeake and Low Country. Chapel Hill, NC : University of North Carolina Press for the Omohundro Institute of Early American History and Culture, 1998.
1999	Lepore, Jill. The Name of War: King Philip's War and the Origins of American Identity. New York : Alfred A. Knopf, 1998.
2000	Merrell, James H. Into the American Woods: Negotiators on the American Frontier. New York : W. W. Norton, 1999.
2000	Dower, John Embracing Defeat: Japan in the Wake of World War II. New York : W. W. Norton and The New Press, 1999.
2000	Gordon, Linda. The Great Arizona Orphan Abduction. Cambridge, Massachusetts : Harvard University Press, 1999.
2001	Bellesiles, Michael. Arming America: The Origins of a National Gun Culture. New York : Alfred A. Knopf, 2000. (Award rescinded in 2002 because of scholarly misconduct by the author.)
2001	Johnson, Susan Lee. Roaring Camp: The Social World of the California Gold Rush. New York : W. W. Norton, 2000.
2001	Nasaw, David. The Chief: The Life of William Randolph Hearst. New York : Houghton Mifflin, 2000.
2002	Blight, David W. Race and Reunion: The Civil War in American Memory. Cambridge, Massachusetts : Belknap Press of Harvard University Press, 2001.
2002	Kessler-Harris, Alice. In Pursuit of Equity: Women, Men, and the Quest for Economic Citizenship in 20th-Century America. Oxford, Eng. : Oxford University Press, 2001.
2003	Brooks, James F. Captives and Cousins: Slavery, Kinship, and Community in the Southwest Borderlands. Chapel Hill, NC : University of North Carolina Press for the Omohundro Institute of Early American History and Culture, 2002.
2003	Gallay, Alan. The Indian Slave Trade: The Rise of the English Empire in the American South, 1670–1717. New Haven, CT : Yale University Press, 2002.
2004	Ayers, Edward L. In the Presence of Mine Enemies: War in the Heart of America, 1859–1863. New York : W. W. Norton, 2003.
2004	Hahn, Steven. A Nation Under Our Feet: Black Political Struggles in the Rural South from Slavery to the Great Migration. Cambridge, Massachusetts : Belknap Press of Harvard University Press, 2003.
2004	Marsden, George M. Jonathan Edwards: A Life. New Haven, CT : Yale University Press, 2003.
2005	Ely, Melvin Patrick. Israel on the Appomattox: A Southern Experiment in Black Freedom from the 1790s Through the Civil War. New York : Alfred A. Knopf, 2004.
2005	Klarman, Michael J. From Jim Crow to Civil Rights: The Supreme Court and the Struggle for Racial Equality. Oxford, Eng. : Oxford University Press, 2004.
2005	O'Brien, Michael. Conjectures of Order: Intellectual Life and the American South, 1810–1860. Chapel Hill, NC : University of North Carolina Press, 2004.
2006	Clarke, Erskine. Dwelling Place: A Plantation Epic. New Haven : Yale University Press, 2005.
2006	Westad, Odd Arne. The Global Cold War: Third World Interventions and the Making of Our Times. Cambridge and New York : Cambridge University Press, 2005.
2006	Wilentz, Sean. The Rise of American Democracy: Jefferson to Lincoln. New York : W. W. Norton, 2005.
2007	Kirby, Jack Temple. Mockingbird Song: Ecological Landscapes of the South. Chapel Hill, NC : University of North Carolina Press, 2006.
2007	Richardson, Robert D. William James: In the Maelstrom of American Modernism. Boston, MA : Houghton Mifflin, 2006.
2008	Brandt, Allan M. The Cigarette Century: The Rise, Fall, and Deadly Persistence of the Product that Defined America. New York : Basic Books, 2007.
2008	Postel, Charles. The Populist Vision. New York : Oxford University Press, 2007.
2008	Silver, Peter. Our Savage Neighbors: How Indian War Transformed Early America. New York : W. W. Norton, 2007.
2009	Andrews, Thomas G. Killing for Coal: America's Deadliest Labor War. Cambridge, Massachusetts : Harvard University Press, 2008.
2009	Faust, Drew Gilpin. This Republic of Suffering: Death and the American Civil War. New York : Alfred A. Knopf, 2008.
2009	Hämäläinen, Pekka. The Comanche Empire. New Haven, CT: Yale University Press, 2008.
2010	Gordon, Linda. Dorothea Lange: A Life Beyond Limits. New York : W.W. Norton & Company, 2009.
2010	Holton, Woody. Abigail Adams. New York : Free Press, 2009.
2010	Jacobs, Margaret D. White Mother to a Dark Race: Settler Colonialism, Maternalism, and the Removal of Indigenous Children in the American West and Australia, 1880-1940. Lincoln, NE : University of Nebraska Press, 2009.
2011	Dubow, Sara. Ourselves Unborn: A History of the Fetus in Modern America. New York : Oxford University Press, 2010.
2011	Foner, Eric. The Fiery Trial: Abraham Lincoln and American Slavery. New York : W. W. Norton & Company, 2010.
2011	Tomlins, Christopher. Freedom Bound: Law, Labor, and Civic Identity in Colonizing English America, 1580-1865. Cambridge, Eng., and New York : Cambridge University Press, 2010.
2012	Hyde, Anne. Empires, Nations and Families: A History of the North American West, 1800-1860. Lincoln, NE : University of Nebraska Press, 2011.
2012	Rodgers, Daniel. Age of Fracture. Cambridge, Massachusetts : Belknap Press of Harvard University, 2011.
2012	Brown-Nagin, Tomiko Courage to Dissent: Atlanta and the Long History of the Civil Rights Movement. Oxford, Eng. : Oxford University Press, 2011.
2013	Bolster, W. Jeffrey. The Mortal Sea: Fishing the Atlantic in the Age of Sail. Cambridge, Massachusetts : Belknap Press of Harvard University, 2012.
2013	Witt, John Fabian. Lincoln's Code: The Laws of War in American History. New York : Free Press, 2012.
2014	Kelman, Ari. A Misplaced Massacre: Struggling over the Memory of Sand Creek. Cambridge, Massachusetts : Harvard University Press, 2013.
2014	Katznelson, Ira. Fear Itself: The New Deal and the Origins of Our Time. New York : Liveright Publishing Corporation / W.W. Norton & Company, 2013.
2015	Beckert, Sven. Empire of Cotton: A Global History. New York : Alfred Knopf, 2014.
2015	Grandin, Greg. The Empire of Necessity: Slavery, Freedom, and Deception in the New World. New York : Metropolitan Books/Henry Holt & Company, 2014.
2016	Bilder, Mary Sarah. Madison's Hand: Revising the Constitutional Convention. Cambridge, Massachusetts : Harvard University Press, 2015.
2016	Rosen, Deborah. Border Law: The First Seminole War and American Nationhood. Cambridge, Massachusetts : Harvard University Press, 2015.
2016	Lipman, Andrew. The Saltwater Frontier: Indians and the Contest for the American Coast. New Haven, CT : Yale University Press, 2015.
2017	Resendez, Andres. The Other Slavery: The Uncovered Story of Indian Enslavement in America. New York : Houghton Mifflin Harcourt, 2016.
2017	Thompson, Heather Ann. Blood in the Water: The Attica Prison Uprising of 1971 and Its Legacy. New York : Pantheon Books, 2016.
2017	Tomes, Nancy. Remaking the American Patient: How Madison Avenue and Modern Medicine Turned Patients Into Consumers. Chapel Hill, NC : University of North Carolina Press, 2016.
2018	Heinrichs, Waldo and Marc Gallicchio. Implacable Foes: War in the Pacific, 1944-1945. Oxford, Eng. : Oxford University Press, 2017.
2018	Warren, Louis S. God's Red Son: The Ghost Dance Religion and the Making of Modern America. New York : Basic Books, 2017.
2018	Winiarski, Douglas L. Darkness Falls on the Land of Light: Experiencing Religious Awakenings in Eighteenth-Century New England. Chapel Hill, NC : University of North Carolina Press for the Omohundro Institute of Early American History and Culture, 2017.
2019	Blight, David W. Frederick Douglass: Prophet of Freedom. New York : Simon and Schuster, 2018.
2019	Brooks, Lisa. Our Beloved Kin: A New History of King Philip's War. New Haven : Yale University Press, 2018.
2020	Cohen, Lizabeth. Saving America's Cities: Ed Logue and the Struggle to Renew Urban America in the Suburban Age. New York : Farrar, Straus and Giroux, 2019.
2020	Reidy, Joseph P. Illusions of Emancipation: The Pursuit of Freedom and Equality in the Twilight of Slavery. Chapel Hill : The University of North Carolina Press, 2019.
2021	Saunt, Claudio. Unworthy Republic: The Dispossession of Native Americans and the Road to Indian Country. New York : W. W. Norton & Company, 2020.
2021	Horowitz, Andy. Katrina: A History, 1915-2015. Cambridge : Harvard University Press, 2020.
2022	Bay, Mia. Traveling Black: A Story of Race and Resistance. Cambridge, Massachusetts : The Belknap Press of Harvard University Press, 2021.
2022	Ngai, Mae. The Chinese Question: The Gold Rushes and Global Politics. New York : W.W. Norton & Company, 2021.
2023	Gage, Beverly. G-Man: J. Edgar Hoover and the Making of the American Century: Viking, 2022.
2023	Hernández, Kelly L. Bad Mexicans: Race, Empire, and Revolution in the Borderlands: W.W. Norton & Company, 2022.
2023	Sweet, John W. The Sewing Girl's Tale: A Story of Crime and Consequences in Revolutionary America: Henry Holt and Company, 2022.
2024	West, Elliott. Continental Reckoning: The American West in the Age of Expansion. Lincoln : University of Nebraska Press, 2023.
2024	Eisenberg, Carolyn Woods. Fire and Rain: Nixon, Kissinger and the Wars in Southeast Asia. New York : Oxford University Press, 2023.
2025	DuVal, Kathleen. Native Nations: A Millennium in North America. New York: Random House, 2024.
2025	Tejani, James. A Machine to Move Ocean and Earth: The Making of the Port of Los Angeles and America. New York: W.W. Norton, 2024.
2026	Lew-Williams, Beth. John Doe Chinaman: A Forgotten History of Chinese Life under American Racial Law. Cambridge: Harvard University Press, 2025.
2026	Connolly, Emilie. Vested Interests: Trusteeship and Native Dispossession in the United States. Princeton: Princeton University Press, 2025.

== See also ==
- List of history awards
- List of American literary awards
- List of literary awards
