= Israel Hill =

Coordinates: 37°18.794′N 78°25.354′W

Israel Hill was an unincorporated community in Prince Edward County, Virginia, United States along the Appomattox River. Founded in 1810 as a community for free black people in the area, Israel Hill has since become part of Farmville, Virginia.

== History ==
Israel Hill developed as a community of free Black people in Prince Edward County, Virginia along the Appomattox River around 1810. The will of Richard Randolph emancipated all of his slaves at Randolph's death in 1796. Israel Hill was established by Judith Randolph after the death of her husband Richard Randolph who inherited land and slaves from his father. He was a nephew of Thomas Jefferson.

In 2009 a historical marker commemorating the community was erected. The community is now part of Farmville, Virginia.

Melvin Patrick Ely, a history professor at the College of William and Mary, wrote Israel on the Appomattox about the community.
