= N. Gordon Levin Jr. =

American historian

- Awards: Bancroft Prize (1969)

Academic background
- Education: Yale University (BA); Harvard University (PhD)

Norman Gordon Levin Jr. is an American historian, and Emeritus Dwight Morrow Professor of History and American Studies at Amherst College.

He earned a B.A. from Yale University in 1956, and graduated from Harvard University with a Ph.D. in 1967. He has taught at Amherst College since 1964, where he specializes in diplomatic history, Israeli history, and the history of nationalism. He was a recipient of the Bancroft Prize in 1969 for his book Woodrow Wilson and World Politics.

== Works ==
- Woodrow Wilson and World Politics. Oxford University Press. 1968. ISBN 978-0-19-500803-6.
- Norman Gordon Levin; Theodore P. Greene (1972). Woodrow Wilson and the Paris Peace Conference. Heath. ISBN 978-0-669-83915-9.
- The Zionist movement in Palestine and world politics, 1880-1918. D. C. Heath. 1974.
- Michael Ira Barach; Norman Gordon Levin (1980). The origins of the Yom Kippur war. Amherst College.
