= Daniel T. Rodgers =

American historian (born 1942)

- Education: Brown University; Yale University (Ph.D.)
- Awards: Bancroft Prize (2012)
- Scientific career
- Fields: American cultural and intellectual history
- Workplaces: Princeton University

Daniel T. Rodgers (born 1942) is an American historian. He is an emeritus professor at Princeton University, and the author of several books.

== Early life ==
Rodgers was born in 1942 in Pennsylvania. He graduated from Brown University in Engineering, and from Yale University with a Ph.D.

== Career ==
Rodgers was Henry Charles Lea Professor at Princeton University until 2012. He was a Guggenheim Fellow in 2007.

His work appeared in Harper's. He has written a history of social ideas across the last three decades of the twentieth century in the United States.

== Awards ==
- 1978; Frederick Jackson Turner Award for The Work Ethic in Industrial America
- 1999: Ellis W. Hawley Prize for Atlantic Crossings
- 1999: George Louis Beer Prize for Atlantic Crossings
- 2011: Bancroft Prize for Age of Fracture

== Works ==
- The Work Ethic in Industrial America, 1850-1920. University of Chicago Press. 1979. ISBN 978-0-226-72352-5.
- Contested Truths: Keywords in American Politics since Independence. Basic Books. 1987. ISBN 978-0-674-16711-7.
- Atlantic Crossings: Social Politics in a Progressive Age. Harvard University Press. 2000. ISBN 978-0-674-00201-2.
- Age of Fracture. Harvard University Press. 2011. ISBN 978-0-674-05744-9.
- As a City on a Hill: The Story of America's Most Famous Lay Sermon. Princeton University Press. 2018. ISBN 978-0-691-18437-1.
