= Lisa Brooks =

American historian

Lisa Brooks is a historian, writer, and professor of English and American studies at Amherst College in Massachusetts where she specializes in the history of Native American and European interactions from the American colonial period to the present.

Brooks is a member of the state-recognized Missisquoi Abenaki Tribe, an Abenaki heritage group in Vermont, and is predominantly of Polish, French, and English heritage. She received her B.A. at Goddard College (1993), her M.A. at Boston College (1995) and her Ph.D. at the Cornell University (2004). She is the author of many articles, essays and popular books including The Common Pot: The Recovery of Native Space in the Northeast, (2008) and Our Beloved Kin (2018). Brooks taught at Harvard University before moving to teach at Amherst College. Brooks teaches several classes on "Native American & Indigenous studies, early American literature, contemporary literature, and comparative American Studies"

In 2019, Our Beloved Kin was one of the winners of the Bancroft Prize.

There is a significant controversy around the veracity of Lisa Brooks' Indigenous ancestry claims. Leaders of recognized Abenaki Nations and heritage organizations have publicly accused Brooks of misrepresenting her background, claiming she has falsely identified as Abenaki for decades.

== Works ==
- The Common Pot: The Recovery of Native Space in the Northeast, Minneapolis: University of Minnesota Press, 2008. ISBN 9780816647835
- Our Beloved Kin: A New History of King Philip's War, New Haven; London: Yale University Press, 2018. ISBN 9780300196733
