= Michael S. Sherry =

American historian

- Occupation: Historian

Michael S. Sherry (born 1945) is an American historian, and professor of history emeritus at Northwestern University.

== Life ==
He graduated from Washington University in St. Louis summa cum laude, and from Yale University with an MA and Ph.D. in 1975.

== Awards ==
- 1988 Bancroft Prize
- 2008 LGBT Award for Nonfiction from the Lambda Literary Foundation

== Works ==
- The Punitive Turn in American Life: How the United States Learned to Fight Crime Like a War (UNC Press Books, 2020). online reviews
- "Patriotic orthodoxy and American decline." in Living with the Bomb: American and Japanese Cultural Conflicts in the Nuclear Age (Taylor and Francis, 2015) pp. 134–152.
- "The United States and Strategic Bombing: From Prophecy to Memory." in Bombing Civilians: A Twentieth-Century History (Free Press, 2008).
- Gay Artists in Modern American Culture: An Imagined Conspiracy. UNC Press. 2007. ISBN 978-0-8078-3121-2.
- In the Shadow of War: The United States Since the 1930s. Yale University Press. 1997. ISBN 978-0-300-07263-1.
- Edward Tabor Linenthal; Tom Engelhardt, eds. (1996). "Patriotic Orthodoxy and American Decline". History wars: the Enola Gay and other battles for the American past. Macmillan. ISBN 978-0-8050-4387-7.
- "Patriotic orthodoxy and US decline." Bulletin of Concerned Asian Scholars 27.2 (1995): 19-25. online
- "The language of war in AIDS discourse." in Writing AIDS: gay literature, language, and analysis (1993): 39-53.
- “War and Weapons: The New Cultural History.” Diplomatic History 14#3 1990, pp. 433–46, online
- The rise of American air power: the creation of Armageddon. Yale University Press. 1989. ISBN 978-0-300-04414-0.
- "The Military." American Quarterly 35.1/2 (1983): 59-79. online
- Preparing For the Next War: American Plans for Postwar Defense, 1941-45 (Yale UP, 1977)
- “Making Military Policy and Military History.” American Quarterly 28#5 1976, pp. 589–600, online
