= Andy Horowitz =

American historian

Andy Horowitz is an American historian and author. In 2021, he won a Bancroft Prize for his book Katrina: A History, 1915-2015 about the flooding caused by Hurricane Katrina in New Orleans, Louisiana and the aftermath of the disaster.

He is an associate professor of history at the University of Connecticut. He also serves as the Connecticut State Historian.

== Publications ==
- Katrina: A History, 1915-2015, Harvard University Press (2020) (ISBN 978-0-674-27107-4)

== Awards and honours ==
- 2021: Bancroft Prize for Katrina: A History, 1915-2015
