= Anne F. Hyde =

American historian and academic

Professor Anne F. Hyde
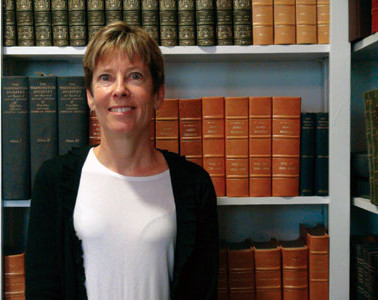
- Born: 1960 (age 65–66); St. Louis, Missouri, U.S.
- Occupations: Historian, Professor, Author

Academic background
- Education: Ph.D. in History; M.A. in History; B.A. in History
- Alma mater: University of California at Berkeley

Academic work
- Discipline: American History
- Sub-discipline: American Culture
- Institutions: University of Oklahoma - Department of History

Anne Farrar Hyde (born 1960) is an American historian, author, and professor, specializing in the U.S. West and comparative North American history. Hyde wrote award-winning books such as Empires, Nations, and Families: A History of the North American West, 1800–1860 and An American Vision: Far Western Landscape and National Culture, 1820–1920. Her most recent book, Born of Lakes and Plains: Mixed Descent Families and the Making of the American West, 2021, is published by W. W. Norton.

== Education ==
Anne Hyde was born in St. Louis, Missouri, but was raised in Reno, Nevada. In 1982, Hyde received her Bachelor of Arts in American Studies at Mount Holyoke College.

In 1984, she completed her Master of Arts in History at the University of California, Berkeley. Four years later, in 1988, Hyde received her Ph.D. in History at the same university.

== Teaching ==
Upon completing her Ph.D., Hyde first began teaching at the Louisiana State University in Baton Rouge as an assistant professor.

In 1991, Anne Hyde began teaching at the Colorado College, where she taught World History, American history, and Race and Ethnic Studies. She joined the Race and Ethnic Studies program in 1992. She became a department chair between 1996 and 1999 and program head between 2003 and 2004. Hyde worked as an assistant professor between 1991 and 1994, and an associate professor between 1994 and 2003. She became a full professor in 2004 and ran the Hulbert Center for Southwest Studies.

In 2016, Professor Hyde moved on to the University of Oklahoma's history faculty. She is editor-in-chief of the Western Historical Quarterly, the major journal in the history of the U.S. West.

In 2011 she was elected to serve on the American Historical Association's Council. She began working on the AHA's Tuning Project, serving as its Faculty Director, starting in 2012. She edited, with dozens of others, the 2013 and 2016 History Discipline Core.

== Works ==
Anne Hyde wrote many pieces during her career. One of her first ones, "An American Vision: Far Western Landscape and American Culture, 1820–1920" was written in 1991 — and won the 1992 W. Turrentine Jackson Award.

In 2000, Professor Hyde co-wrote "The West in the History of the Nation" with William Deverell.

In 2012, Professor Hyde published "Empires, Nations, and Families: A History of the North American West, 1800–1860" — which won the 2012 Bancroft Prize, and the Caughey Western History Prize. This book was also a Pulitzer Prize finalist in History.

Professor Hyde also wrote the introduction to "Frémont's First Impressions: The Original Report of His Exploring Expeditions of 1842–1844" that was published in 2012.

Most recently, her book, Born of Lakes and Plains: Mixed Descent Families and the Making of the American West, 2021, is published by W. W. Norton. According to Publishers Weekly, the book, "upends prevailing narratives about relations between Indigenous people and white Americans in this sweeping history of “the families and relationships that enabled Native peoples to survive into the present.”
