= The Origins of the Urban Crisis =

Nonfiction book by Thomas J. Sugrue

The Origins of the Urban Crisis: Race and Inequality in Postwar Detroit
- Author: Thomas J. Sugrue
- Language: English
- Subject: Sociology, Urban planning, History
- Genre: nonfiction
- Publisher: Princeton University Press
- Publication date: April 1996
- Publication place: United States
- Pages: 375 pp
- ISBN: 0-691-12186-9
- OCLC: 59879791
- Dewey Decimal: 305.8/00977434 22
- LC Class: F574.D49 N4835 2005

The Origins of the Urban Crisis: Race and Inequality in Postwar Detroit is the first book by historian and Detroit native Thomas J. Sugrue in which he examines the role race, housing, job discrimination, and capital flight played in the decline of Detroit. Sugrue argues that the decline of Detroit began long before the 1967 race riot. Sugrue argues that institutionalized and often legalized racism resulted in sharply limited opportunities for African Americans in Detroit for most of the 20th century. He also argues that the process of deindustrialization, the flight of investment and jobs from the city, began in the 1950s as employers moved to suburban areas and small towns and also introduced new labor-saving technologies. The book has won multiple awards including Bancroft Prize in 1998.

== Awards ==
Origins of the Urban Crisis won the 1998 Bancroft Prize in American History, the 1996 Social Science History Association President's Book Award for a first work by a beginning scholar, the 1996 Philip Taft Prize in Labor History, and the 1997 Urban History Association Prize for Best Book in North American Labor History. In 2005, Princeton University Press selected Origins of the Urban Crisis as one of its 100 most influential books of the preceding century and issued it as a Princeton Classic. In 2014, Princeton published a new edition of the book, with a new preface discussing Detroit's bankruptcy.
