= Elizabeth Stevenson (academic) =

American writer (1919–1999)

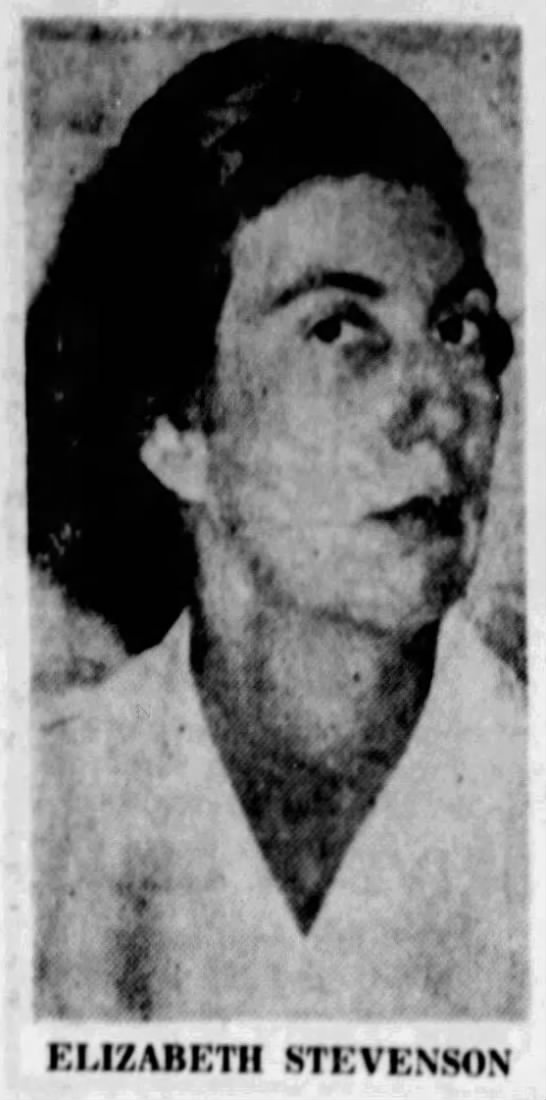
- Born: June 13, 1919; Ancón, Panama
- Died: July 30, 1999 (aged 80); Decatur, Georgia
- Writing career
- Notable awards: Bancroft Prize (1956), Guggenheim Fellowship (1951 and 1958)

Elizabeth Stevenson (June 13, 1919 – July 30, 1999) was an American author between the late 1940s to mid 1990s. Stevenson began her writing career in 1949 with The Crooked Corridor: A Study of Henry James. Leading up to the 1970s, she wrote biographies on Henry Adams, Lafcadio Hearn and Frederick Law Olmsted. Additional works by Stevenson were Babbitts and Bohemians: The American 1920s in 1967 and Figures in a Western Landscape: Men and Women of the Northern Rockies in 1994. She was the Bancroft Prize's first female recipient during 1956 with Henry Adams: A Biography.

Apart from her writing career, Stevenson began working at Southern Bell during the 1940s. She joined the Atlanta Public Library as an assistant in 1948 and remained there until 1956. Stevenson went to Emory University in the early 1960s. She started out as a secretary before becoming the "first female faculty member" at their Institute for the Liberal Arts in 1975. Stevenson was given the title of emeritus following her retirement in 1986.

== Early life and education ==
Stevenson was born at Ancón, Panama, on June 13, 1919, in the Panama Canal Zone. She spent her childhood with two siblings in Great Falls, Montana, then lived in Atlanta, Georgia, as a teenager. For her post-secondary education, Stevenson went to Agnes Scott College for a Bachelor of Arts in the early 1940s.

== Career ==
Stevenson began her career at Southern Bell during the 1940s. She also worked for the War Production Board and War Assets Administration by 1947. The following year, she joined the Atlanta Public Library as an assistant and remained there until 1956. From the early 1960s to late 1970s, Stevenson was a secretary at Emory University. In 1975, she was the "first female faculty member" at the Institute for the Liberal Arts with Emory. Stevenson remained at the university until her retirement in 1986 and given the title of emeritus.

As an author, Stevenson wrote about Henry James's publications with her 1949 book titled The Crooked Corridor: A Study of Henry James. In 1955, Stevenson moved on to Henry Adams with Henry Adams: A Biography. Stevenson continued her publications on Adams as the editor for A Henry Adams Reader during 1958. In 1960, Stevenson was chosen to work as a judge for the National Book Award for Nonfiction.

She then moved on to Lafcadio Hearn when she released Lafcadio Hearn: A Biography the following year. As a contributor, she was a part of Pride and Prejudice's 1962 re-release. She expanded her writings in 1967 with the release of Babbitts and Bohemians: The American 1920s. Her book on Frederick Law Olmsted, Park Maker: A Life of Frederick Law Olmsted, was released ten years later.

During 1979, Stevenson planned to use the history of Montana as the subject of her publication. Stevenson continued to write with her 1994 book titled Figures in a Western Landscape: Men and Women of the Northern Rockies. Some people in her book included Calamity Jane, Osborne Russell and Pretty Shield.

== Writing process and reception ==
Before conducting research, Stevenson created bibliographies for her publications. Some places she went to for her book on Hearn include Japan and Martinique. Ray Murphy of The Boston Globe said "maps or diagrams ... would have been helpful" for Stevenson's biography on Olmsted.

== Awards and honors ==
From the Georgia Writers Association, The Crooked Corridor won the Literary Achievement category in 1950. Henry Adams was the non-fiction recipient during the 1956 edition of the GWA awards. That year, Henry Adams received the Bancroft Prize. With her win, Stevenson was the Bancroft Prize's first female recipient. While in Atlanta, Stevenson won the city's 1955 Woman of the Year in Arts award during 1956. Her book on Hearn was selected as a GWA winner in 1962.

Stevenson was awarded the Guggenheim Fellowship twice in 1951 and 1958. She received a research stipend for her Olmsted biography from the National Endowment for the Humanities in 1974. The following year, she was given a grant from the American Council of Learned Societies for this book.

== Death ==
Stevenson died of cancer on July 30, 1999, at Peachtree Hospice in the DeKalb Medical Center, Decatur, Georgia. Her remains were cremated and a memorial service was held at Decatur on August 1, 1999.
