= Martin D. Smith (environmental economist) =

American environmental economist

- Occupation: George M. Woodwell Distinguished Professor of Environmental Economics

Academic background
- Education: Ph.D., University of California - Davis (2001); B.A., Stanford University (1992); Stanford University; University of California, Davis

Academic work
- Discipline: Economics
- Sub-discipline: Environmental Economics, Marine Conservation
- Institutions: Duke University

Martin D. Smith (born September 12, 1970) is an American environmental economist and the George M. Woodwell Distinguished Professor of Environmental Economics at Duke University's Nicholas School of the Environment. He is known for his research on fisheries economics, marine conservation, seafood markets, and climate change impacts on coastal areas.

== Education ==
Smith received his B.A. in Public Policy from Stanford University in 1992 and his Ph.D. in Agricultural and Resource Economics from the University of California, Davis in 2001. For his Ph.D. thesis "Spatial Behavior, Marine Reserves, and the California Red Sea Urchin Fishery” he was awarded "outstanding dissertation" by the American Agricultural Economics Association.

== Career ==
Smith joined the faculty at Duke University in 2001 as an assistant professor in the Nicholas School of the Environment. He was promoted to associate professor in 2008 and full professor in 2011. In 2016, he was named the George M. Woodwell Distinguished Professor of Environmental Economics.

Smith has held a number of leadership positions at Duke. He served chaired the Nicholas School's Education Committee from 2010 to 2014. He also holds a Secondary Appointment at Department of Economics. He has served on several university committees including the Advisory Committee on Appointment, Promotion and Tenure.

== Research ==
Smith's research focuses on the economics of marine conservation and fisheries management. He has published extensively on topics such as marine protected areas, individual fishing quotas, climate change adaptation in coastal zones, and seafood markets.

His research has been published in leading journals including Science, Proceedings of the National Academy of Sciences,Nature, and the American Economic Review.

Smith is known for combining economic theory and advanced econometric methods to analyze fisher behavior, evaluate policy impacts, and model coupled human-natural systems. His interdisciplinary approach integrates biology, ecology, and geoscience with economics.

== Honors and awards ==
Smith has received the Quality of Research Discovery from the Agricultural and Applied Economics Association, Outstanding Article in Marine Resource Economics, and an Aldo Leopold Leadership Fellowship. In 2022 Martin Smith was named Fellow of the International Institute of Fisheries Economic & Trade (IIFET).

His research has been funded by the National Science Foundation, the National Oceanic and Atmospheric Administration, the National Center for Ecological Analysis and Synthesis, and the Research Council of Norway. Smith has served as Editor-in-Chief of the journal Marine Resource Economics, Co-Editor of the Journal of the Association of Environmental and Resource Economists, and Co-Editor of the Journal of Environmental Economics and Management. He served as a member of the Scientific and Statistical Committee of the Mid-Atlantic Fishery Management Council and currently serves on the Ocean Studies Board of the National Academies.

== Personal life ==
In addition to being an academic scholar, Smith is also a singer songwriter. Together with Peter Giuliano and Mehran Sahami, he forms the band The Gland, which has released the album "Ode to Mern Blenston". Smith is married to historian Kathleen Duval, and together they have two sons.
