= Native Nations =

Native American history book by Kathleen DuVal

Native Nations: A Millennium in North America
- Author: Kathleen DuVal
- Language: English
- Subject: Indigenous peoples of North America; United States history
- Genre: History
- Publisher: Random House
- Publication date: April 9, 2024
- Publication place: United States
- Media type: Print (hardcover & paperback), e-book, audiobook
- Pages: 752
- ISBN: 978-0-525-51103-8

Native Nations: A Millennium in North America is a nonfiction history book by American historian Kathleen DuVal published in 2024. The book surveys a millennium of Indigenous history across North America, and highlights the political power, diplomacy, and endurance that the indigenous North Americans exercised both among themselves and against later European explorers and settlers over the centuries.

The book has won the 2025 Pulitzer Prize for History, the 2025 Bancroft Prize, the 2025 Mark Lynton History Prize, and the 2024 Cundill History Prize.

== See also ==
- History of Native Americans in the United States
- Indigenous peoples of North America
- 1491
- An Indigenous Peoples' History of the United States
