= The Social Transformation of American Medicine =

Book by Paul Starr

- First edition
- Author: Paul Starr
- Language: English
- Genre: Non-fiction
- Publisher: Basic Books
- Publication date: 1982

The Social Transformation of American Medicine is a book written by Paul Starr and published by Basic Books in 1982. It won the 1984 Pulitzer Prize for General Nonfiction as well as the Bancroft Prize.

Capers Jones wrote, "Paul Starr's book detailed the attempts of the American Medical Association to improve academic training of physicians, establish a canon of professional malpractice to weed out quacks, and to improve the professional status of physicians."

According to Lester S. King, the book "offers illumnation and stimulation to physicians and laymen alike and can serve as a reference for scholars. It will give a deeper insight into medical sociology, whose importance to modern life is constantly expanding."

A second edition with a new epilogue by Starr was published in 2017.
