= Great River: The Rio Grande in North American History =

1954 book by Paul Horgan

- Author: Paul Horgan
- Language: English
- Genre: Non-fiction
- Publisher: RINEHART & COMPANY, INC.
- Publication date: 1954
- Publication place: United States

Great River: The Rio Grande in North American History is a book by Paul Horgan. It won the Pulitzer Prize for History and the Bancroft Prize in 1955.
