= Unworthy Republic =

2020 non-fiction book by Claudio Saunt

- First edition
- Author: Claudio Saunt
- Subject: History
- Publisher: W. W. Norton & Company
- Publication date: 2020
- Pages: 416
- ISBN: 978-0393609844

Unworthy Republic: The Dispossession of Native Americans and the Road to Indian Territory is a 2020 book by historian Claudio Saunt that focuses on the forced removal of Native Americans from the eastern United States during the early 19th century. It was awarded the Bancroft Prize in American history, and was a finalist for the National Book Award for Nonfiction.

== Synopsis ==
Saunt describes the US policy of Indian removal in the Eastern United States. He highlights the relationship between slavery and the expulsion of Native Americans. He shows that the deportation of Native Americans allowed for the expansion of southern slavery, and for investment by Wall Street Bankers and the northern financial industry. Saunt covers numerous important events including but not limited to the Black Hawk War, the Trail of Tears, and the Seminole Wars.

== Awards ==
- Finalist for National Book Award for Nonfiction
- Longlisted for the Cundill History Prize
- Publishers Weekly Top 10 Books of the Year
- Washington Post Top 10 Books of the Year
- New York Times Critics' Top Books of the Year
- Bancroft Prize
- Robert F. Kennedy Book Award
- Ridenhour Book Prize
