= Age of Fracture =

2011 book by Daniel T. Rodgers

- Author: Daniel T. Rodgers
- Subject: 20th century United States history, social history
- Published: 2011 (Belknap Press)
- Pages: 360
- ISBN: 9780674057449

Age of Fracture is a 2011 history book about the disintegration of shared values in American social debate around the 1980s. It was written by Daniel T. Rodgers and published by Belknap Press. It won the 2012 Bancroft Prize.
