= Thomas J. Sugrue =

American historian (born 1962)

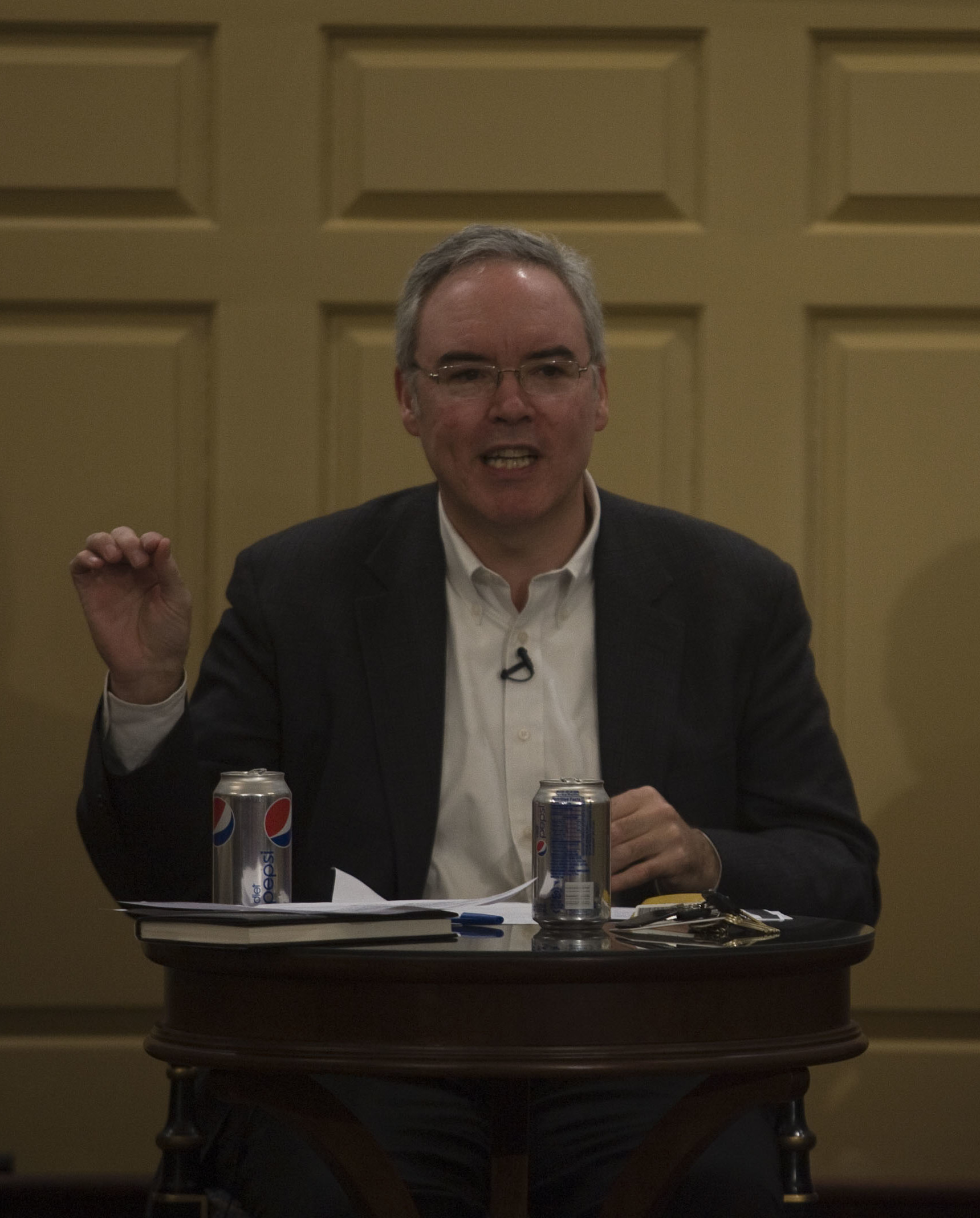
- Born: 1962 (age 63–64); Detroit, Michigan, U.S.
- Education: Columbia University; University of Cambridge; Harvard University (PhD)
- Awards: Bancroft Prize (1998)
- Scientific career
- Workplaces: University of Pennsylvania (1991-2015); New York University (2015-)

Thomas J. Sugrue (born 1962) is an American historian of the 20th-century United States currently serving as a professor at New York University. From 1991 to 2015, he was the David Boies Professor of History and Sociology at the University of Pennsylvania and founding director of the Penn Social Science and Policy Forum. His areas of expertise include American urban history, American political history, housing and the history of race relations. He has published extensively on the history of liberalism and conservatism, on housing and real estate, on poverty and public policy, on civil rights, and on the history of affirmative action.

== Early life ==
Sugrue was born in 1962 in Detroit, Michigan and lived there until the age of ten, when his family moved to the suburbs. He graduated from Brother Rice High School (Michigan) in 1980 and from Columbia University (Summa Cum Laude, Phi Beta Kappa) in 1984, with a degree in history. One of his mentors at Columbia was James P. Shenton. From 1984 to 1986, Sugrue attended King's College, Cambridge, on a Kellett Fellowship and earned a B.A. (honours) in British History and the Doncaster History Prize of King's College. He earned his Ph.D. in history from Harvard University in 1992 working with Stephan Thernstrom and Barbara Gutmann Rosenkrantz.

== Academic ==
Sugrue began his teaching career at the University of Pennsylvania in 1991. He has been a visiting faculty member at New York University, Harvard University, and the Ecole des Hautes Etudes en Sciences Sociales in Paris. Sugrue's first book, The Origins of the Urban Crisis (Princeton University Press, 1996) won the Bancroft Prize in History, the President's Book Award of the Social Science History Association, the Philip Taft Prize in Labor History, the Urban History Association Prize for Best Book in North American Labor History, and was selected as a Choice Outstanding Book. In 2005, Princeton University Press selected Origins of the Urban Crisis as one of its 100 most influential books of the preceding century and issued it as a Princeton Classic. Sugrue has also co-edited five books, including W.E.B. DuBois, Race, and the City (University of Pennsylvania Press, 1998), with Michael B. Katz, and The New Suburban History (University of Chicago Press, 2005), with Kevin M. Kruse. His 2008 book Sweet Land of Liberty: The Forgotten Struggle for Civil Rights in the North was a finalist for the Los Angeles Times Book Prize in History, and a main selection of the History Book Club. He is also author of Not Even Past: Barack Obama and the Burden of Race. and These United States: The Making of a Nation, 1890 to the Present with Glenda Gilmore.

He has also published essays and reviews in The Wall Street Journal, The New York Times, The Washington Post, The Nation, London Review of Books, Chicago Tribune, The Philadelphia Inquirer, and Detroit Free Press. In 2010 he served as a guest-blogger for Ta-Nehisi Coates at The Atlantic.

Sugrue has won fellowships and grants from the Brookings Institution, the Social Science Research Council, the Guggenheim Foundation, the American Council of Learned Societies, the American Philosophical Society, and the Institute for Advanced Study in Princeton. He was an inaugural Alphonse Fletcher Foundation Fellow, and was in the first class of Andrew Carnegie Fellows in 2015. He is an elected Fellow of the American Academy of Arts and Sciences, the New York Institute for the Humanities, and is the Walter Lippmann Fellow of the American Academy of Political and Social Science. In 2013–14, he served as President of the Urban History Association. In 2016, he received an honorary doctorate from Wayne State University.

== Background ==
Sugrue acted as an expert for the University of Michigan in two federal court cases regarding affirmative action in undergraduate and law school admissions - Grutter v. Bollinger and Gratz v. Bollinger, decided by the U.S. Supreme Court in 2003. He was vice chair of the City of Philadelphia Historical Commission from 2001 to 2008.

Sugrue has won two teaching awards and been mentor to dissertation students. He is a public speaker, having given more than 300 talks to audiences at universities, foundations, community groups, and religious congregations throughout the United States and in Canada, Britain, France, Argentina, Japan, Israel, and Germany. Sugrue has appeared in several television series and documentary films.

== Selected works ==
- The Origins of the Urban Crisis: Race and Inequality in Postwar Detroit (1996, Princeton Classic Edition, 2005, Princeton Classic Paperback, 2014)
- W.E.B. DuBois, Race, and the City: The Philadelphia Negro and Its Legacy (1998), with Michael B. Katz
- The New Suburban History (2005), with Kevin M. Kruse
- Sweet Land of Liberty: The Forgotten Struggle for Civil Rights in the North (2008)
- Not Even Past: Barack Obama and the Burden of Race (2010)
- These United States: The Making of a Nation, 1890 to the Present (2015), with Glenda Gilmore
- Immigration and Metropolitan Revitalization (2017), with Domenic Vitiello
- Neoliberal Cities: The Remaking of Postwar Urban America (2020), with Andrew J. Diamond
- The Long Year: A 2020 Reader (2022), with Caitlin Zaloom
