= Lamy of Santa Fe =

1975 biography of Catholic Archbishop Jean Baptiste Lamy

- First edition
- Author: Paul Horgan
- Genre: History
- Publisher: Farrar, Straus and Giroux
- Publication date: 1975
- Publication place: United States
- Pages: 560
- Awards: Pulitzer Prize for History
- ISBN: 9780819565327

Lamy of Santa Fe, his life and times is a 1975 biography of Catholic Archbishop Jean Baptiste Lamy, written by American author Paul Horgan and published by Farrar, Straus and Giroux. The book won the 1976 Pulitzer Prize for History. In 2012, the Catholic organisation Southwest Indian Foundation commissioned a special printing of a hardcover edition from RR Donnelley.
