= Thomas Doerflinger =

American historian (1952–2015)

- Born: Thomas M. Doerflinger; 1952
- Died: 2015 (aged 62–63)
- Education: Princeton University
- Occupation: Historian
- Awards: Bancroft Prize (1987)

Thomas M. Doerflinger (1952–2015) was an American historian.

== Life ==
He is the son of William Main Doerflinger. He was a MCEAS Dissertation Fellow, at Harvard University in 1978-1979.

He trained as a historian at Princeton and Harvard.

He died on August 23, 2015.

== Awards ==
- 1987 Bancroft Prize
- 1980 Bowdoin Prize for Graduate Essays

== Works ==
- "How to Succeed in Business: An Exchange", The New York Review of Books, July 11, 1996
- "Rural Capitalism in Iron Country: Staffing a Forest Factory, 1808–1815", William & Mary Quarterly, January 2002
- "The Antilles Trade of the Old Regime: A Statistical Overview", Journal of Interdisciplinary History, Winter 1976
- A Vigorous Spirit of Enterprise: Merchants and Economic Development in Revolutionary Philadelphia. UNC Press. 1986. ISBN 978-0-8078-4946-0.
- Thomas M. Doerflinger; Jack L. Rivkin (1987). Risk and reward: venture capital and the making of America's great industries. Random House. ISBN 978-0-394-54929-3.
- Enterprise on the Delaware. Harvard University. 1980.
