= Neil R. McMillen =

American historian and professor

- Born: 1939 (age 86–87); Michigan, U.S.

Academic background
- Education: University of Southern Mississippi (BA, MA); Vanderbilt University (PhD)
- Thesis: The Citizens' Council: A History of Organized Southern White Resistance to the Second Reconstruction (1969)
- Doctoral advisor: Dewey W. Grantham

Academic work
- Discipline: Historian
- Sub-discipline: Southern U.S. history; U.S. Civil Rights history
- Institutions: University of Southern Mississippi

Neil R. McMillen (born 1939) is an American historian, and professor emeritus at University of Southern Mississippi.

== Life ==
He graduated from the University of Southern Mississippi with a BA and MA, and from Vanderbilt University with a Ph.D. His papers are held at University of Southern Mississippi.

== Awards ==
- 1990 Bancroft Prize
- 1990 Gustavus Myers Prize
- 1990 McLemore Prize
- 1990 Pulitzer Prize finalist
- 2005 B. L. C. Wailes Award

== Works ==
- "The American Reaction to the Rise of Nazi Germany, March, 1933 – March, 1934" (USM thesis, 1963)
- Thomas Jefferson: Philosopher of Freedom. Chicago: Rand McNally. 1973. ISBN 978-0-528-82487-6.
- Charles Grier Sellers; Henry Farnham May; Neil R. McMillen (1974). A synopsis of American history. I.R. Dee. Chicago: Rand McNally College Pub. Co. ISBN 978-0-929587-74-5. (7th Edition 1992)
- Dark Journey: Black Mississippians in the Age of Jim Crow. Urbana: University of Illinois Press. 1989. ISBN 978-0-252-06156-1.
- The Citizens' Council: Organized Resistance to the Second Reconstruction, 1954-64. Urbana: University of Illinois Press. 1994. ISBN 978-0-252-06441-8. (1st edition 1971)
- Neil R. McMillen, ed. (1997). Remaking Dixie: The Impact of World War II on the American South. Jackson, Miss.: University Press of Mississippi. ISBN 978-0-87805-928-7.
- Geoffrey Jensen; Andrew Wiest, eds. (2001). "World War II and the Origins of the Civil Rights Movement". War in the age of technology: myriad faces of modern armed conflict. NYU Press. ISBN 978-0-8147-4251-8.
