= Sara Dubow =

American history professor

- Born: United States
- Education: Williams College (BA); University of Massachusetts Amherst (MA); Rutgers University (PhD)
- Occupations: Professor of history, Williams College
- Known for: 2011 recipient of Columbia University’s Bancroft Prize for her first book, Ourselves Unborn: A History of the Fetus in Modern America (Oxford University Press, 2010)

Sara Dubow is an American professor of history at Williams College in Williamstown, Massachusetts. Her research and teaching have focused on the ways in which gender, law, and politics shaped American history during the twentieth century.

In 2011, she was awarded the Bancroft Prize from Columbia University for her first book, Ourselves Unborn: A History of the Fetus in Modern America (Oxford University Press, 2010).

== Education ==
Dubow earned her Bachelor of Arts degree at Williams College in 1991. She was then awarded her Master of Arts by the University of Massachusetts Amherst in 1996 and a Doctor of Philosophy in history by Rutgers University in 2003.

== Academic career ==
Dubow began her academic career as an educator at the Brearley School in New York City, and also taught at that city's Hunter College High School, and Hunter College. She was then hired by Williams College as a member of its history department faculty in 2007 after having initially served as a visiting professor at Williams.

In 2011, while still an assistant professor at Williams College, she was awarded Columbia University's Bancroft Prize for her 2010 book, Ourselves Unborn: A History of the Fetus in Modern America, which was published by the Oxford University Press. In 2012, she was promoted to the position of associate professor with tenure by the Williams College Board of Trustees.

Subsequently awarded a New Directions Fellowship by the Andrew W. Mellon Foundation to develop research projects related to the legal history of reproductive and sexual politics, she then spent the 2013–2014 academic year as a visiting researcher at the Yale Law School.

In 2017, she was awarded a Princeton University library research grant for her project, “Conscience Wars: Conscientious Objection and Religious Accommodations in Modern America, 1965-2016.”

From 2020 to 2023, Dubow served as an associate dean of the faculty at Williams College.

The courses she has taught during her tenure at Williams College have included:

- Approaching the Past: Biographical Methods
- Modern U.S. History
- Recent U.S. History: The 1970s and 1980s
- Sex, Gender, and the Law in U.S. History
- The Fourteenth Amendment and the Meaning of Equality

== Publications and presentations ==
An abridged list of Dubow's publications and presentations includes:

- Dubow, Sara. “‘I Always Pick the Losing Cause’: Dorothy Kenyon, the ACLU, and the Development of Feminist Jurisprudence,” the 2023 UMass Amherst Distinguished Annual Lecture in History. Amherst, Massachusetts: University of Massachusetts Amherst, April 20, 2023.
- Dubow, Sara. “‘A Constitutional Right Rendered Utterly Meaningless’: Religious Exemptions and Reproductive Politics, 1973–2014,” in Journal of Policy History (2015), vol. 27, no. 1, pp. 1–35. Cambridge University Press, December 8, 2014.
- Dubow, Sara. Ourselves Unborn: Fetal Meanings in Modern America. New York, New York: Oxford University Press, 2011.
