= David E. Kyvig =

American historian

David Edward Kyvig
- Born: March 8, 1944
- Died: June 22, 2015 (aged 71)
- Education: Ph.D.
- Alma mater: Northwestern University
- Occupation: Historian
- Employer: Northern Illinois University

David Edward Kyvig (March 8, 1944 – June 22, 2015) was an American historian, and Distinguished Research Professor at Northern Illinois University.

== Life ==
Kyvig graduated from Kalamazoo College cum laude in 1966, and from Northwestern University with a Ph.D. in 1971. He taught at Kalamazoo College, University of Tromsø, the University of Akron, and Northern Illinois University.

== Awards ==
- 2004–2005 Woodrow Wilson International Center for Scholars resident fellow
- 1997 Bancroft Prize
- 1987–1988 Fulbright Professor of American Civilization

== Works ==
- David E. Kyvig, ed. (1976). FDR's America. Forum Press. ISBN 978-0-88273-201-5.
- David E. Kyvig; Myron A. Marty (1978). Your Family History, A Handbook for Research and Writing. Harlan Davidson.
- Repealing National Prohibition (1st ed.). Chicago: The University of Chicago Press. 1979. ISBN 0-226-46641-8.
- David E. Kyvig; Myron A. Marty (1982). Nearby History: Exploring the Past Around You. Rowman & Littlefield. ISBN 978-0-7425-0271-0. (2nd ed., 2000)
- David E. Kyvig, ed. (1985). Law, Alcohol, and Order. Greenwood Press. ISBN 978-0-313-24755-2. (Japanese ed., 1999)
- David E. Kyvig, ed. (1990). "Foreign Relations of the Reagan Administration". Reagan and the world. ABC-CLIO. ISBN 978-0-275-93565-8.
- Explicit and Authentic Acts: Amending the U.S. Constitution, 1776–1995. University Press of Kansas. 1996. ISBN 978-0-7006-0792-1.
- Unintended Consequences of Constitutional Amendment. University of Georgia Press. 2000. ISBN 978-0-8203-2191-2.
- Daily Life in the United States, 1920–1940. Greenwood Publishing Group. 2002. ISBN 978-0-313-29555-3.
- Michael Les Benedict; John F. Winkler, eds. (2004). "Ohio and the Shaping of the U.S. Constitution". The history of Ohio law. Ohio University Press. ISBN 978-0-8214-1546-7.
- "The Unintended Consequences of an Amendment to Ban Gay Marriage", History News Network, 7-12-04
- "Past and Present: The Starr Report and Clinton Impeachment", U.S. News & World Report, September 11, 2008
