= Winthrop D. Jordan =

American historian

- Born: 11 November 1931; Worcester, Massachusetts
- Died: 23 February 2007 (aged 75); Oxford, Mississippi
- Works: White Over Black: American Attitudes Toward the Negro, 1550-1812

Winthrop Donaldson Jordan (November 11, 1931 – February 23, 2007) was an American historian and professor who specialized in the history of slavery in the United States and racism against Black Americans. His 1968 work White Over Black: American Attitudes Toward the Negro, 1550-1812 was awarded the National Book Award in History and Biography.

The work has been described in a review as "one of the most important contributions yet made to the history of racial relationships in early America", and helped to inspire serious scholarly enquiry into interracial relationships in North America, specifically President Thomas Jefferson's relationship with one of his female slaves, Sally Hemings. In 1993, Jordan won a second Bancroft Prize for Tumult and Silence at Second Creek: An Inquiry into a Civil War Slave Conspiracy. In this work, Jordan brought to light details of a previously unstudied slave revolt near Natchez, Mississippi.

== Early life and education ==
Jordan was born in Worcester, Massachusetts, to a long line of scholars and liberal thinkers. He was the son of Henry Donaldson Jordan, a professor of 19th-century British and American politics at Clark University, and Lucretia Mott Churchill, great-great-granddaughter of the Quaker abolitionists and women's rights advocates James and Lucretia Coffin Mott. One of Jordan's great uncles, Edward Needles Hallowell, was a commanding officer of the celebrated Civil War 54th Massachusetts of the United States Colored Troops (USCT).

As a young man, Jordan attended the prestigious Phillips Academy in Andover, Massachusetts before going on to receive an A.B. in social relations from Harvard University in 1953, an M.A. in history from Clark University in 1957, and a Ph.D. in history in 1960 from Brown University, which later recognized him as a distinguished alumnus. Jordan's doctoral dissertation formed the foundation of what became his master work White Over Black.

== Career ==
Jordan's teaching career began in 1955 as a history instructor at Phillips Exeter Academy. After completing graduate school, Jordan spent two years as a fellow at the College of William and Mary's Institute of Early American History and Culture. He was Professor of History at University of California, Berkeley, from 1963 to 1982, and the school's Associate Dean for Minority Group Affairs Graduate Division, 1968–70. As early as 1962, when he published an article on the status of 'mulattoes' in the Thirteen Colonies, Jordan's work helped to illuminate the so-called one-drop rule, a uniquely American example of hypodescent. It defined as "black" or African-American, persons with any amount of African ancestry, and was adopted into twentieth-century U.S. state laws, such as in 1924 in Virginia. His synthesis, White Over Black, looked at the history of race relations in the United States, and was influential for its assessment of issues of interracial sexuality. In assessing allegations about Thomas Jefferson and a liaison with his slave, Jordan was the first historian to use Dumas Malone's timeline of Jefferson's activities to demonstrate that he was at Monticello for the conception of each of Sally Hemings' children.

In 1982, Jordan relocated to the University of Mississippi, where he was the William F. Winter Professor of History and Afro-American Studies for more than 20 years. While there he influenced many graduate and undergraduate students.

== Marriage and family ==
He married Phyllis Henry. They had three sons Joshua, Mott, and Eliot Jordan, and later divorced.

With his second marriage in 1982 to attorney and author Cora Miner Reilly (d. January 10, 2011), Winthrop Jordan became the stepfather of Stephen, Michael, and Mary Beth Reilly. He and Cora Jordan helped to found the first official Quaker meeting in the state of Mississippi.

A few years after his 2004 retirement, Jordan died in his Oxford, Mississippi home at the age of 75 after suffering from Lou Gehrig's Disease and liver cancer for several years.

== Legacy and honors ==
- In 2005, some of Jordan's former students published a collection of essays inspired by his influence, entitled Affect and Power: Essays on Sex, Slavery, Race, and Religion.
- 2007, his former students established the Winthrop Jordan Memorial Research Fund "to further Professor Jordan's legacy of teaching, scholarship, and philanthropy by supporting graduate student research in slavery, race, religion, and sexuality."
