= James Merrell =

American historian (born 1953)

- Born: James Hart Merrell; 1953 (age 72–73); Saint Paul, Minnesota, U.S.
- Education: Lawrence University; Johns Hopkins University (PhD)
- Occupation: Historian
- Awards: Frederick Jackson Turner Award (1990); Merle Curti Award (1990); Bancroft Prize (1990, 2000)

James Hart Merrell (born 1953 in Minnesota) is an American historian specializing in early American history. He has written extensively on Native American history during the colonial era, and is one of only five historians to be awarded the Bancroft Prize twice. He is the Lucy Maynard Salmon Professor of History Emeritus at Vassar College.

== Education ==
Merrell was born and raised in Saint Paul, Minnesota. He earned his undergraduate degree at Lawrence University and continued his studies at Oxford University as a Rhodes Scholar. He received his Ph.D. from Johns Hopkins University in 1982.

== Career ==
Merrell was a Fellow at The Newberry Library Center for the History of the American Indian in Chicago and at the Institute of Early American History and Culture in Williamsburg, Virginia. He has also received fellowships from the American Council of Learned Societies, the John Simon Guggenheim Memorial Foundation, and the National Endowment for the Humanities.

He has taught at Vassar College since 1984, except for the 1998–1999 academic year, when he was a professor at Northwestern University.

== Awards ==
- 1991 Guggenheim Fellowship
- 1990 Frederick Jackson Turner Award, for The Indians' New World: Catawbas and their Neighbors from European Contact Through the Era of Removal
- The Merle Curti Award from the Organization of American Historians
- Bancroft Prize (twice)
  - 1990 – The Indians' New World: Catawbas and Their Neighbors from European Contact through the Era of Removal
  - 2000 – Into the American Woods: Negotiators on the Pennsylvania Frontier
- Finalist for the Pulitzer Prize for History for Into the American Woods: Negotiators on the Pennsylvania Frontier

== Bibliography ==
- The Indians' New World: Catawbas and Their Neighbors from European Contact through the Era of Removal. UNC Press. 1989. ISBN 978-0-8078-1832-9.
- Into the American Woods: Negotiators on the Pennsylvania Frontier. W. W. Norton & Company. 2000. ISBN 978-0-393-31976-7.
- Peter C. Mancall; James Hart Merrell, eds. (2000). American encounters: natives and newcomers from European contact to Indian removal, 1500-1850. Routledge. ISBN 978-0-415-92375-0.
- Daniel K. Richter; James H. Merrell, eds. (2003). Beyond the covenant chain: the Iroquois and their neighbors in Indian North America, 1600-1800. Penn State Press. ISBN 978-0-271-02299-4.
- Roger L. Nichols, ed. (1986). "The Indians' New World: The Catawba Experience". The American Indian: past and present. Verlag für die Deutsche Wirtschaft AG. ISBN 978-0-394-35238-1.
- Philip D. Morgan, ed. (1993). "The Customes of Our Countrey: Indians and Colonialists in Early America". Diversity and unity in early North America. Routledge. ISBN 978-0-415-08798-8.
- Daniel Vickers, ed. (2003). "Indian History During the English Colonial Era". A companion to Colonial America. Wiley-Blackwell. ISBN 978-0-631-21011-5.
