= Susan Lee Johnson =

American historian

- Education: Carthage College (BA); Arizona State University (MA); Yale University (PhD)
- Occupation: Historian
- Awards: Bancroft Prize (2001)

Susan Lee Johnson is an American historian.

== Life ==
In 1978 Johnson received a B.A. in history from Carthage College in Kenosha, Wisconsin, and in 1984 an M.A. at Arizona State University, and in 1993 a Ph.D. from Yale University. Johnson currently holds the Harry Reid Endowed Chair for the History of the Intermountain West at the University of Nevada, Las Vegas, and is an emeritus professor at the University of Wisconsin in Madison, Wisconsin.

Her work includes research into settlement patterns in the Western United States during the 19th century .

== Awards ==
- 2001 Bancroft Prize

== Works ==
- Writing Kit Carson: Fallen Heroes in a Changing West. Chapel Hill: University of North Carolina Press, 2020. ISBN 978-1-4696-5883-4
- Roaring Camp: The Social World of the California Gold Rush. New York: W. W. Norton. 2000. ISBN 978-0-393-32099-2.
- The Lesbian Issue: Essays from Signs (Chicago: University of Chicago Press, 1985), co-edited with Estelle Freedman, Barbara Gelpi, and Kath Weston. ISBN 978-0-226-26151-5
- “Writing Kit Carson in the Cold War: ‘The Family,’ ‘The West,’ and Their Chroniclers,” in On the Borders of Love and Power: Families and Kinship in the Intercultural American Southwest, ed. David Wallace Adams and Crista DeLuzio (Berkeley: University of California Press, 2012), pp. 278-318.
- “Nail This to Your Door: A Disputation on the Power, Efficacy, and Indulgent Delusion of Western Scholarship that Neglects the Challenge of Gender and Women’s History,” Pacific Historical Review 79, no. 4 (Fall 2010): 605–17.
- “The Last Fandango: Women, Work, and the End of the California Gold Rush,” in Riches for All: The California Gold Rush and the World, ed. Kenneth N. Owens (Lincoln: University of Nebraska Press, 2002), pp. 230–63.
- Kevin Starr; Richard Orsi, eds. (2000). "'My own private life': Toward a History of Desire in Gold Rush California". Rooted in Barbarous Soil: People, Culture, and Community in Gold Rush California. Berkeley: University of California Press. ISBN 978-0-520-22496-4.
- “‘A memory sweet to soldiers’: The Significance of Gender in the History of the ‘American West,’” Western Historical Quarterly 24, no. 4 (1993). Reprinted in:
  - Clyde Milner ed. (1996) A New Significance: Re-envisioning the History of the American West, New York: Oxford University Press, ISBN 978-0-19-510048-8
  - Mary Ann Irwin; James Brooks, eds. (2004). Women and Gender in the American West: Jensen-Miller Prize Essays from the Coalition for Western Women's History. Albuquerque: University of New Mexico Press. ISBN 978-0-8263-3599-9.
- "The United States of Jessie Benton Fremont: Corresponding with the Nation", Reviews in American History, Volume 23, Number 2, June 1995
- Vicki Ruíz; Ellen Carol DuBois, eds. (2000). ""Domestic" Live in the Diggings: The Southern Mines in the California Gold Rush". Unequal sisters: a multicultural reader in U.S. women's history. Routledge. p. 105. ISBN 978-0-415-92516-7. "Susan Lee Johnson."
