= Melvin Patrick Ely =

American historian

- Born: 1952 (age 73–74); Richmond, Virginia, US
- Awards: Bancroft Prize (2005); Fulbright Professorship (1998–1999)

Academic background
- Education: Princeton University (BA); University of Texas (MA); Princeton University (MA, PhD)

Academic work
- Discipline: Historian
- Sub-discipline: African-American history

Melvin Patrick Ely (pronounced ['ili]; born 1952 in Richmond, Virginia) is a history professor and author in Virginia. He has written books about Amos 'n' Andy and Israel Hill.

== Life ==
He grew up in Richmond and graduated from Princeton University, and from the University of Texas at Austin with a master's degree in linguistics, and from Princeton University with a master's degree in history in 1982 and with a doctoral degree in 1985. He taught at Yale University, and at the Hebrew University of Jerusalem. He is currently the William R. Kenan, Jr. Professor of Humanities at the College of William and Mary.

== Awards ==
- 2005 Bancroft Prize
- 1998–1999 Fulbright Professor of American Studies

== Works ==
- Israel on the Appomattox: A Southern Experiment in Black Freedom from the 1790s Through the Civil War. Random House, Inc. 2005. ISBN 978-0-679-76872-2.
- The Adventures of Amos 'n' Andy: A Social History of an American Phenomenon. Free Press. 1992. ISBN 978-0-02-909503-4.
- Amotz Zahavi; Avishag Zahavi; Melvin Patrick Ely (1999). The Handicap Principle: a missing piece of Darwin's puzzle. Illustrator Amir Balaban. Oxford University Press. ISBN 978-0-19-512914-4.
- Amos 'n' Andy: lineage, life, and legacy, Princeton University, 1985
- A Terrible Intimacy: Interracial life in the slaveholding South. Henry Holt. 2026.
