= Margaret D. Jacobs =

American historian

Margaret Jacobs
- Born: January 31, 1963 (age 63)

Academic background
- Education: BA, history, 1986, Stanford University; MA, 1992, PhD, 1996, University of California, Davis
- Thesis: Uplifting cultures: encounters between white women and Pueblo Indians, 1890-1935 (1996)

Margaret Davis Jacobs (born January 31, 1963) is an American historian. She is the Chancellor's Professor of History and Charles Mach Professor at the University of Nebraska–Lincoln.

== Early life and education ==
Jacobs was born on January 31, 1963. She grew up in Colorado but also lived in California and Oregon. Jacobs completed her Bachelor of Arts degree in history at Stanford University in 1986 before enrolling at the University of California, Davis for her graduate degrees.

== Career ==
Following her PhD, Jacobs taught history at New Mexico State University for seven years before joining the faculty at the University of Nebraska–Lincoln (UNL) in 2004. As a professor of history and the director of the Women's and Gender Studies Program, Jacobs published two book by 2009. Her first book was titled Engendered Encounters: Feminism and Pueblo Cultures, 1879-1934 and her second book was titled White Mother to a Dark Race: Settler Colonialism, Maternalism, and the Removal of Indigenous Children in the American West and Australia, 1880-1940. Her second book received one of three 2010 Bancroft Prizes and the 2011 Athearn Book Award. Two years later, Jacobs also received a fellowship from the American Council of Learned Societies to expand on her research from White Mother to a Dark Race. In 2015, Jacobs was appointed the Pitt Professor of American History and Institutions at the University of Cambridge for the 2015–16 academic year.

Throughout her tenure at UNL, Jacobs studied the removal of indigenous children from their families during the settlement of America’s West by white Europeans. In 2018, Jacobs became the first UNL professor to receive an Andrew Carnegie Fellowship. The following year, she was recognized for her research with an election to the American Academy of Arts and Sciences. Jacobs also received a three-year grant from the National Endowment for the Humanities to digitize, contextualize, and make available materials related to the Genoa Indian Industrial School. In 2021, Jacobs was named a Charles Mach Professor by the University of Nebraska, one of the highest forms of recognition bestowed upon faculty.

== Works ==
- Maternal Colonialism: White Women and Indigenous Child Removal in the American West and Australia, 1880–1940
- Engendered encounters: feminism and Pueblo cultures, 1879-1934 ISBN 978-0-8032-7609-3
- White Mother to a Dark Race: Settler Colonialism, Maternalism, and the Removal of Indigenous Children in the American West and Australia, 1880-1940 ISBN 978-0-8032-1100-1
- A Generation Removed: The Fostering and Adoption of Indigenous Children in the Postwar World. Lincoln, NE: University of Nebraska Press, 2014. ISBN 978-0-8032-5536-4
- "After One Hundred Winters: In Search of Reconciliation on America's Stolen Land, 2021" ISBN 9780691224336
