= Paul Horgan =

American novelist (1903–1995)

- Born: August 1, 1903; Buffalo, New York, U.S.
- Died: March 8, 1995 (aged 91); Middletown, Connecticut, U.S.
- Occupation: Writer
- Writing career
- Genre: Historical fiction
- Notable awards: Pulitzer Prizes for History

Paul George Vincent O'Shaughnessy Horgan (August 1, 1903 – March 8, 1995) was an American writer of historical fiction and non-fiction who mainly wrote about the Southwestern United States. He was the recipient of two Pulitzer Prizes for History.

Historian David McCullough wrote of Horgan in 1989: "With the exception of Wallace Stegner, no living American has so distinguished himself in both fiction and history."

== Biography ==
Paul Horgan was born in Buffalo, New York, to a Catholic family on August 1, 1903. After his father contracted tuberculosis, the family moved in 1915 to Albuquerque, New Mexico for health reasons. Horgan attended New Mexico Military Institute in Roswell, New Mexico, where he formed a lifelong friendship with classmate and future artist Peter Hurd. Horgan befriended physicist J. Robert Oppenheimer in 1922 during a visit to New Mexico. After finishing high school, Horgan spent a year working for a local newspaper.

In 1923, Horgan enrolled in the Eastman School of Music in Rochester, New York, but dropped out after the first year. He worked for the next three years in Rochester as the set designer for a new opera company being started by tenor Vladimir Rosing. Although Horgan had never designed sets before, he convinced Rosing to give him the job. The fledgling opera company later became the American Opera Company.

In 1924, Horgan returned to Albuquerque. He published his first novel, The Fault of Angels, about his experiences in Rochester in 1923; it won the Harper Prize. He continued to write 17 novels plus other works over the next five decades. Horgan served as president of the American Catholic Historical Association.

During World War II, Horgan moved to Washington, D.C., to serve as the head of the Army Information Branch of the US War Department. He would eventually receive the Legion of Merit and be promoted to lieutenant colonel. He received a Guggenheim Fellowship in 1947. In 1955, Horgan won the Pulitzer Prize for History and the Bancroft Prize for history with Great River: The Rio Grande in North American History, a history of the Rio Grande River in Mexico and the United States.

In 1959, Horgan became a fellow at the Center for Advanced Studies (CAS) at Wesleyan University in Middletown, Connecticut. Over the next 35 years, he would serve as a director of CAS, an adjunct professor of English, and as a professor emeritus and permanent author-in-residence. The author Charles Barber served as a personal assistant to Horgan when Barber was a college student. During this period, Horgan also taught seminars and workshops at Yale University and the University of Iowa.

In 1976, Horgan won the Pulitzer Prize for History for Lamy of Santa Fe (Wesleyan University Press), a biography of Archbishop Jean-Baptiste Lamy.

Horgan published 40 books and received 19 honorary degrees from universities in the United States. He received a papal knighthood from Pope Pius XII. Horgan died at Middlesex County Hospital in Middletown, Connecticut, on March 8, 1995.

== Literary works ==
In 1970, Horgan started his "Heroic Triad" of novels, about the different cultures in the Southwest, with the publication of Whitewater. It was followed by Thin Mountain Air in 1977 and Mexico Bay in 1982.

One of Horgan's most popular works was A Distant Trumpet, an historical novel based on the Apache wars in the Southwest. Horgan's 1972 book Encounters With Stravinsky, a biography of composer Igor Stravinsky, was called "an utterly irresistible book" by New York Times reviewer Simon Karlinsky. In 1960, author Robert Franklin Gish praised Horgan's literary contributions in the monograph Paul Horgan: Yankee Plainsman and a few other works.

- Ronny Baier (2003). "Paul Horgan". In Bautz, Traugott (ed.). Biographisch-Bibliographisches Kirchenlexikon (BBKL) (in German). Vol. 21. Nordhausen: Bautz. cols. 664–668. ISBN 3-88309-110-3.

=== Fiction ===
- The Fault of Angels (1933)
- No Quarter Given (1935)
- The Return of the Weed (1936), short stories
- Main Line West (1936)
- A Lamp on the Plains (1937)
- Far from Cibola (1938)
- The Habit of Empire (1939)
- Figures in the Landscape (1940)
- The Common Heart (1942)
- Devil in the Desert (1950)
- Things As They Are (1951)
- One Red Rose for Christmas (1952)
- The Saintmaker's Christmas Eve (1955) (translated into German by Annemarie Böll as Weihnachtsabend in San Cristobal)
- Give Me Possession (1957)
- A Distant Trumpet (1960)
- Mountain Standard Time (1962), contains Main Line West, Far from Cibola, and The Common Heart
- Toby and the Nighttime (1963), juvenile
- Memories of the Future (1966)
- The Peach Stone: Stories from Four Decades (1967), short stories
- Everything to Live For (1968)
- Whitewater (1970)
- The Thin Mountain Air (1977)
- Mexico Bay (1982)
- The Clerihews of Paul Horgan (1985) light verse
- The Richard Trilogy (1990) contains Things As they Are, Everything to Live For, and The Thin Mountain Air

=== Nonfiction ===
- Men of Arms (1931)
- From the Royal City (1936)
- New Mexico's Own Chronicle (with historian Maurice Garland Fulton) (1937)
- Diary and Letters of Josiah Gregg, 1840-1847 (1941)
- Look at America: The Southwest (1947)
- Great River: The Rio Grande in North American History (1951)
- The Centuries of Santa Fe (1956)
- Rome Eternal (1959)
- Citizen of New Salem (1961)
- Conquistadors in North American History (1963)
- Songs After Lincoln (1965)
- Peter Hurd: A Portrait Sketch from Life (1965), about the painter Peter Hurd
- Maurice Baring Restored (editor) (1969), an anthology of prose and a few poems by Maurice Baring
- The Heroic Triad. Essays in the Social Energies of Three Southwestern Cultures (1970)
- Encounters with Stravinsky (1972) about the composer Igor Stravinsky
- Approaches to Writing (1974)
- Lamy of Santa Fe: His Life and Times (1975), about Archbishop Jean-Baptiste Lamy
- Josiah Gregg and His Vision of the Early West (1979), about the explorer Josiah Gregg
- Henriette Wyeth (1980) about the painter Henriette Wyeth
- On the Climate of Books (1981), essays
- Of America: East & West (1984)
- Under the Sangre de Cristo (1985)
- A Certain Climate (1988), essays
- A Writer's Eye (1988)
- Tracings: A Book of Partial Portraits (1993)
