= Kathleen DuVal =

American historian

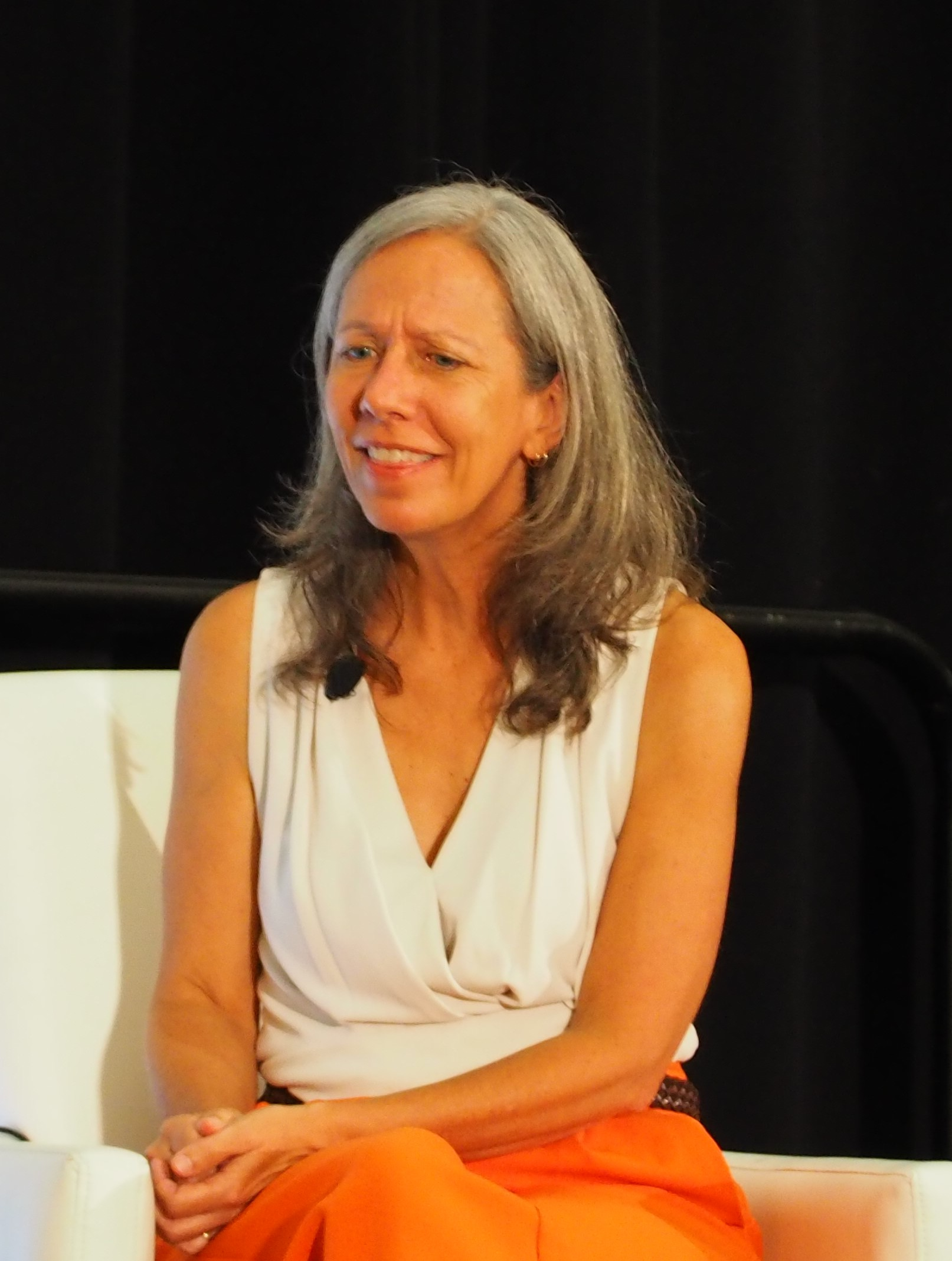
- Born: 1970
- Occupations: Historian, university teacher
- Employer: University of North Carolina at Chapel Hill
- Awards: Guggenheim Fellowship (2018)

Kathleen DuVal is an American historian and a professor of history at the University of North Carolina at Chapel Hill. Her 2024 book Native Nations: A Millennium in North America was awarded a Pulitzer Prize in History, a Bancroft Prize, the Cundill History Prize and the Mark Lynton History Prize.

== Early life and education ==
DuVal was born in 1970. Her father is the literary translator John DuVal. She obtained a bachelor of arts degree in history from Stanford University in 1992 and a Ph.D. in U.S. History from the University of California, Davis in 2001.

== Career ==
DuVal worked at the University of Pennsylvania as a visiting assistant professor from 2001 to 2003. In 2003, she joined the faculty of the University of North Carolina at Chapel Hill, where she served as an assistant professor from 2003 to 2009, and as an associate professor from 2009 to 2015. In 2015, she became a full professor of history.

DuVal's research focuses on political, economic, and social factors that shaped the early American colonies and the formation of the United States, as well as interactions among Africans, Europeans, and Native Americans, on the borderlands of North America.

In 2006, she released her first book The Native Ground: Indians and Colonists in the Heart of the Continent on interactions between Native Americans and Europeans in Colonial America. This was followed in 2009 by Interpreting a Continent: Voices from Colonial America, which co-authored with her father, about the multicultural origins of American colonists.

Her third book, Independence Lost: Lives on the Edge of the American Revolution, dealt with war on the fronts of Spanish Louisiana and British West Florida and considered the perspective of 8 historically marginalized and under-represented people in colonial America, including a slave, Native American leaders and women. The book was awarded the 2016 George Washington Book Prize for the best book about the founding of the United States.

She was awarded a Guggenheim Fellowship in 2018 in the field of U.S. History. Her fourth and fifth books were Voices of Freedom in 2019 and Give Me Liberty! in 2023.

In 2024, DuVal released Native Nations: A Millennium in North America. The details the history of North American tribes from settling in North America to the present day. DuVal drew upon written and oral histories to write the book.

== Critical reception ==
Of her book The Native Ground, the Journal of the Early Republic called it a "work of immense significance" and the American Historical Review said it persuasively argued "the varied strategies Natives used to hold (and even expand) their ground." The Journal of Southern History considering her "argument is more clear and persuasive than most."

Of her book Native Nations: A Millennium in North America, the jury for the Bancroft Prize called the work "a seamless panorama of 1,000 years of American history", and stated that the historical narrative helped one understand the renaissance of Native American culture in the present day.

== Personal life ==
DuVal is married to the environmental economist Martin Smith. The couple have two sons.

== Bibliography ==
- Foner, Eric; DuVal, Kathleen; McGirr, Lisa (2025). Give Me Liberty! an american history. New York: W.W. Norton & Company, Inc. ISBN 978-1-324-10361-5.
- DuVal, Kathleen (2024). Native nations: a millennium of indigenous change and persistence. New York: Random House. ISBN 978-0-525-51103-8.
- DuVal, Kathleen (2015). Independence Lost: Lives on the Edge of the American Revolution. New York: Random House. ISBN 978-1-4000-6895-1.
- Interpreting a continent: voices from colonial America. Lanham, Md: Rowman and Littlefield Publishers. 2009. ISBN 978-0-7425-5182-4.
- DuVal, Kathleen (2006). The native ground: Indians and colonists in the heart of the continent. Philadelphia: University of Pennsylvania Press. ISBN 978-0-8122-3918-8.
