= Brendan McConville =

American author and professor of history

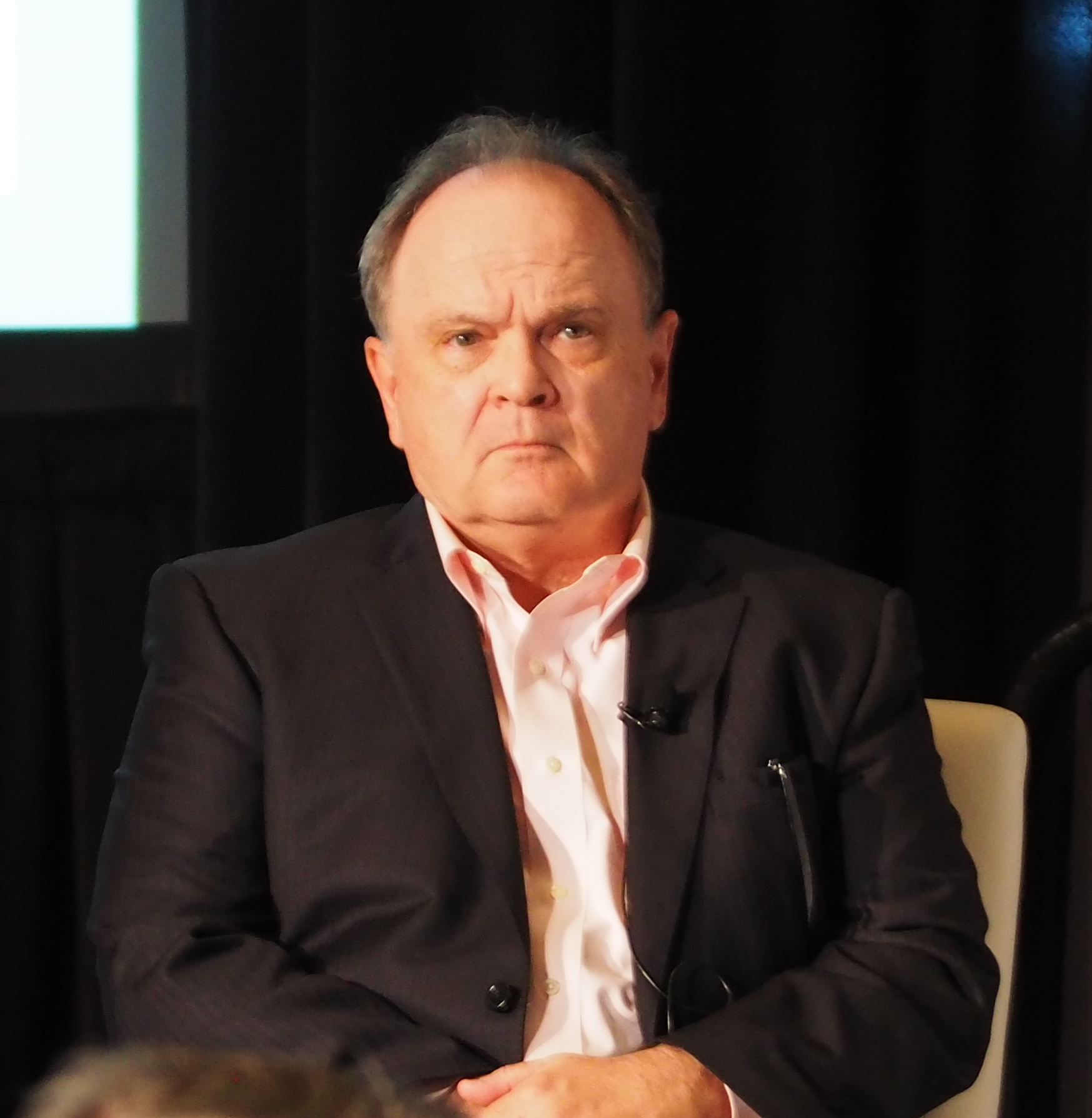
- Born: 1962 (age 63–64)
- Education: Brown University
- Scientific career
- Fields: American history
- Workplaces: Boston University

Brendan McConville (born 1965) is an American author and professor of history at Boston University. His books on American history include The King's Three Faces (University of Carolina Press, 2006) and The American Revolution, 1763-1789 (Longman, 2008).

== Career ==
McConville was educated at Brown University and Reed College, Portland. His research focuses on the intersection of politics and social developments in Early America, and his interests include colonial history and the English Reformation. He is Head of the David Center for the American Revolution at the American Philosophical Society in Philadelphia.

== Reception ==
After the release of These Daring Disturbers of the Public Peace, Michael Bellesiles wrote that "Brendan McConville has produced an outstanding work of social history. A few scholars have looked briefly at New Jersey's 1740s land riots, but McConville is the first to place these events in their deep historical context."

In a review of The King's Three Faces for Itinerario, Charles W. A. Prior writes that McConville "brings a great deal of fresh material to light." In Common-place: The Interactive Journal of Early American Life, Benjamin Irvin called the book "a brilliant, bounding study of Anglo-American political culture." The book was also reviewed in The New England Quarterly, The Journal of Military History and The American Historical Review.

== Bibliography ==
- These Daring Disturbers of the Public Peace: The Struggle for Property and Power in Early New Jersey (University of Pennsylvania Press, 1999) ISBN 9780801433894
- The Brethren: A Story of Faith and Conspiracy in Revolutionary America (Harvard University Press, 2001) ISBN 9780674249165
- The King's Three Faces: The Rise and Fall of Royal America, 1688-1776 (Omohundro Institute and UNC Press, 2006) ISBN 9780807858660
- The American Revolution, 1763-1789 (Longman, 2008) ISBN 9780582328204
- (contributor) The American Revolution at 250: Twenty-Four Historians Reflect on the Founding (University of Virginia Press, 2026) ISBN 9780813954622
