= Alan Dawley =

American historian

Alan Dawley (December 18, 1943 – March 12, 2008) was a professor of history at The College of New Jersey.

Dawley was a 1965 graduate of Oberlin College, and completed his M.A. (1966) and Ph.D. (1971) at Harvard University. He then joined the faculty of The College of New Jersey.

He received the Bancroft Prize in 1977 for his book Class and Community.

He wrote mainly on the US Progressive Era. He died in Mexico on March 12, 2008, of a heart attack.

== Selected bibliography ==
- Class and Community: The Industrial Revolution in Lynn. (Harvard University Press, 1976) Winner of the Bancroft Prize.
- Working for Democracy: American Workers from the Revolution to the Present. (co-editor with Paul Buhle) (University of Illinois Press, 1985)
- Struggles for Justice: Social Responsibility and the Liberal State. (Harvard University Press, 1991)
- Changing the World: American Progressives in War and Revolution, 1914-1924. (Princeton University Press, 2003)
