= Louis R. Harlan =

American historian (1922–2010)

- Born: Louis Rudolph Harlan; July 13, 1922; Clay County, Mississippi, U.S.
- Died: January 22, 2010 (aged 87); Lexington, Virginia, U.S.
- Occupation: Academic historian
- Awards: Bancroft Prize; Pulitzer Prize for Biography or Autobiography

Academic background
- Education: Emory University; Vanderbilt University (M.A.); Johns Hopkins University (Ph.D.)

Academic work
- Institutions: East Texas State Teachers College], University of Cincinnati, University of Maryland

Louis Rudolph Harlan (July 13, 1922 – January 22, 2010) was an American academic historian who wrote a two-volume biography of the African-American educator and social leader Booker T. Washington and edited several volumes of Washington materials. He won the Bancroft Prize in 1973 and 1984, once for each volume, and the 1984 Pulitzer Prize for Biography or Autobiography for the second volume.

== Early years ==
Harlan was born in Clay County, Mississippi, near the small city West Point. When he was three, his father was financially unable to retain their farm and moved the family to another small city, Decatur, Georgia. At the start of World War II, while he was a history student at nearby Emory University, Harlan enlisted in the Navy and, upon receiving his degree (B.A., 1943), entered midshipman's school in 1943. Serving as an officer on an infantry landing craft, he participated in the D-Day Normandy Landings as well as subsequent invasions in southern France. In the wake of V-E Day, he was assigned to Enewetak Atoll in the Marshall Islands, in anticipation of the planned invasion of Japan. Over fifty years later, in his 1996 wartime memoir, All at Sea: Coming of Age in World War II, published by University of Illinois Press, he recalled the long-ago conflict and drew historical lessons and parallels for future generations. Discharged in 1945, with the rank of lieutenant, he returned to the study of history, earning an M.A. at Vanderbilt University (1948) and a Ph.D. at Johns Hopkins University (1955) where, upon hearing a presentation by African-American historian John Hope Franklin, he determined to make race relations in the South his main field of endeavor. At Johns Hopkins, Harlan was a student of C. Vann Woodward.

== Career as historian of Booker T. Washington ==
In 1958, as a white Southerner during the early years of the civil rights movement, Louis Harlan published his first book, Separate and Unequal: Public School Campaigns and Racism in the Southern Seaport States, 1901–1915. Following stints as an associate professor at East Texas State Teachers College and University of Cincinnati, he became, in 1965, professor of history at the University of Maryland, within easy access to the collection of documents left by Booker T. Washington. Over the next two decades, he continued to work on Washington's biography, while also editing, with another Washington historian, Raymond W. Smock, an edition of Washington's papers, which were published over a 14-year period, between 1972 and 1988, ultimately reaching fourteen volumes.

The two volumes of the biography, published 11 years apart, received praise from scholars and historians who referred to Harlan's ability in elucidating Washington's personality which, in Harlan's words, "had vanished into the roles it had played".

During his career, Harlan also served as president of the American Historical Association, the Organization of American Historians, and the Southern Historical Association. He retired in 1992 and spent the immediate years completing his war memoir. Diagnosed with Crohn's disease, he died in Lexington, Virginia, at the age of 87, and was survived by his wife, Sadie, two sons, Louis and Benjamin, and a grandchild.

== Awards ==
- 1984, Pulitzer Prize for Biography or Autobiography for Booker T. Washington, volume 2
- 1973 and 1984, Bancroft Prize, for Booker T. Washington, volumes 1 and 2
- Beveridge Award for his books about Booker T. Washington

== Works ==
- Booker T. Washington: the Making of a Black Leader, 1856–1901. Oxford University Press. 1972. ISBN 978-0195015966.
- Booker T. Washington: the Wizard of Tuskegee, 1901–1915, Volume 2. Oxford University Press. 1983. ISBN 978-0-19-503202-4.

=== Essays ===
- Raymond Smock, ed. (2006). Booker T. Washington in Perspective: Essays of Louis R. Harlan. University Press of Mississippi. ISBN 978-1-57806-928-6.
- "Sympathy and Detachment: Dilemmas of a Biographer" Conspectus of History 1.1 (1974): 29–36.

=== Memoir ===
- ALL AT SEA: Coming of Age in World War II. University of Illinois Press. 2001. ISBN 978-0-252-07072-3.
