= The Native Ground =

2006 book by historian Kathleen DuVal

- Author: Kathleen DuVal
- Subject: History of Native Americans in the United States
- Publisher: University of Pennsylvania Press
- Publication date: 2006
- Pages: 330

The Native Ground: Indians and Colonists in the Heart of the Continent is a 2006 book by Kathleen DuVal on Native Americans in the Arkansas River Valley from the mid-16th century to early 19th century.

== Bibliography ==
- Bellin, Joshua David (2009). "Scholars and Sovereignty: Rethinking Native Studies for a New Decade". Eighteenth-Century Studies. 42 (3): 458–462. ISSN 0013-2586. JSTOR 40264223.
- Dowd, Gregory Evans (2007). "Review of The Native Ground: Indians and Colonists in the Heart of the Continent". The William and Mary Quarterly. 64 (2): 424–427. ISSN 0043-5597. JSTOR 4491628.
- Hämäläinen, Pekka (2007). "Review of The Native Ground: Indians and Colonists in the Heart of the Continent". Western Historical Quarterly. 38 (3): 388–389. doi:10.2307/25443576. ISSN 0043-3810. JSTOR 25443576.
- Inman, Natalie (2010). "Review of The Native Ground: Indians and Colonists in the Heart of the Continent". Tennessee Historical Quarterly. 69 (4): 352–354. ISSN 0040-3261. JSTOR 42628209.
- LeMaster, Michelle (2008). "The Native Ground: Indians and Colonists in the Heart of the Continent". Ethnohistory. 55 (3): 497–498. doi:10.1215/00141801-2008-007. ISSN 0014-1801.
- Key, Joseph (2007). "Review of The Native Ground: Indians and Colonists in the Heart of the Continent". The Journal of Southern History. 73 (4): 868–869. doi:10.2307/27649572. ISSN 0022-4642. JSTOR 27649572.
- Marsh, Ben (2007). "Facing West, South, and North, as Well as East, from Indian Country". Reviews in American History. 35 (2): 176–183. ISSN 0048-7511. JSTOR 30031636.
- Mcdonnell, Michael A. (2008). "Review of The Native Ground: Indians and Colonists in the Heart of the Continent". Australasian Journal of American Studies. 27 (2): 156–158. ISSN 1838-9554. JSTOR 41220092.
- Miles, Ray (2007). "Review of The Native Ground: Indians and Colonists in the Heart of the Continent". Louisiana History: The Journal of the Louisiana Historical Association. 48 (4): 490–492. ISSN 0024-6816. JSTOR 25478515.
- Nicholas, Mark A.; Cox, Robert S.; Onuf, Rachel K. (2008). "Review of The Native Ground: Indians and Colonists in the Heart of the Continent". Journal of the Early Republic. 28 (3): 477–481. ISSN 0275-1275. JSTOR 40208161.
- O'Brien, Greg (2007). "Review of The Native Ground: Indians and Colonists in the Heart of the Continent". The Journal of American History. 94 (1): 268. doi:10.2307/25094836. ISSN 0021-8723. JSTOR 25094836.
- Piker, Joshua (2007). "Review of The Native Ground: Indians and Colonists in the Heart of the Continent". The American Historical Review. 112 (3): 839–840. ISSN 0002-8762. JSTOR 40006709.
- Smith, F. Todd (2006). "Review of The Native Ground: Indians and Colonists in the Heart of the Continent". The Register of the Kentucky Historical Society. 104 (2): 297–298. ISSN 0023-0243. JSTOR 23386680.
- West, Elliott (2007). "Review of The Native Ground: Indians and Colonists in the Heart of the Continent". The Arkansas Historical Quarterly. 66 (1): 71–73. ISSN 0004-1823. JSTOR 40021101.
