= Paul Starr =

American professor of sociology (born 1949)

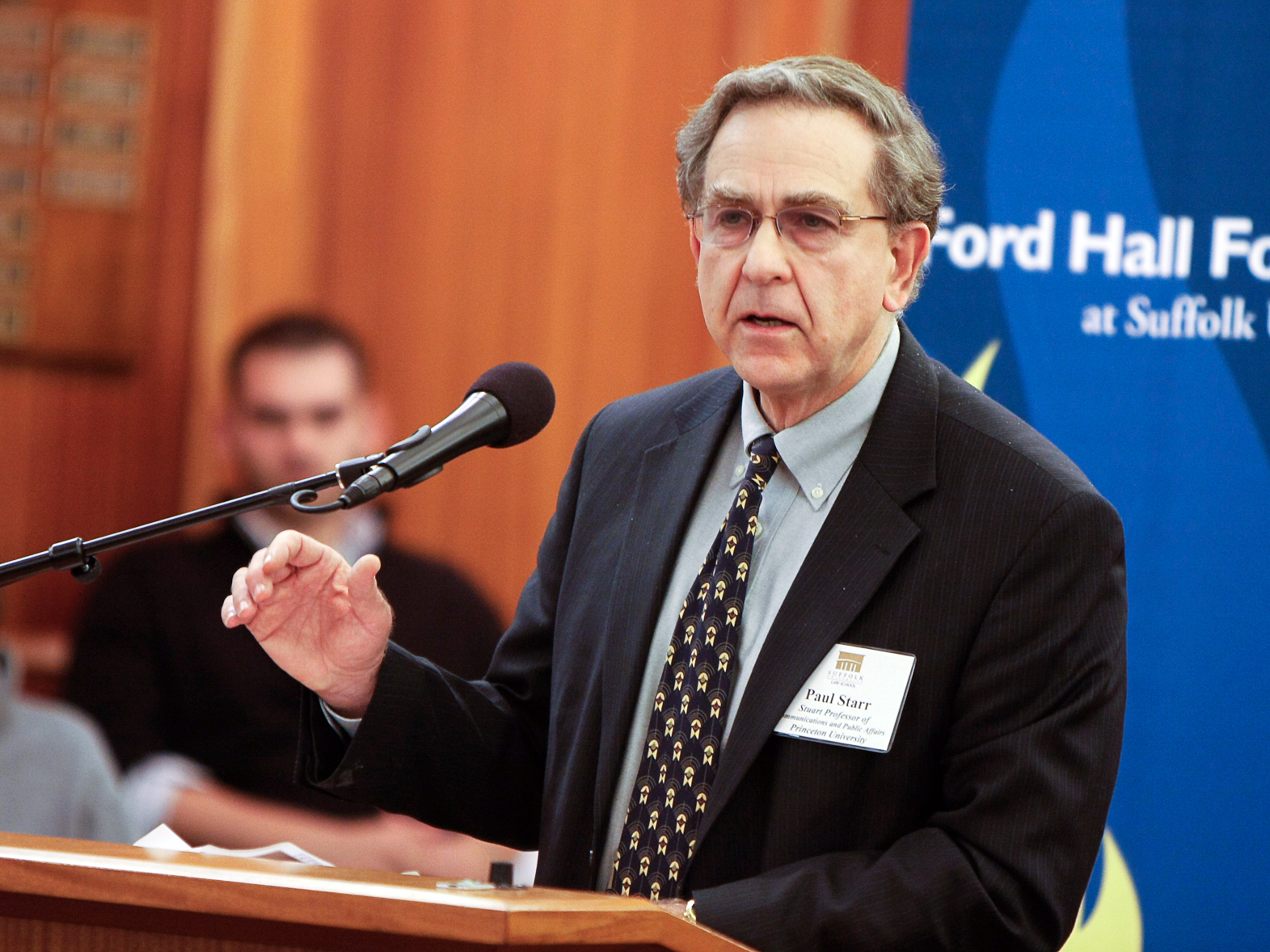
Paul Starr lectures at the Rappaport Center for Law and Service, Suffolk University Law School, October 1, 2009.

Paul Elliot Starr (born May 12, 1949) is a professor of sociology and public affairs at Princeton University. He is also the co-editor (with Robert Kuttner) and co-founder (with Kuttner and Robert Reich) of The American Prospect, a notable liberal magazine created in 1990. In 1994, he founded the Electronic Policy Network, or Moving Ideas, an online public policy resource. In 1993, Starr was the senior advisor for President Bill Clinton's proposed health care reform plan. He is also the president of the Sandra Starr Foundation.

At Princeton University, Starr holds the Stuart Chair in Communications and Public Affairs at the Princeton School of Public and International Affairs. Of his many publications, Starr is best known for his book The Social Transformation of American Medicine published by Basic Books in 1983.

In 2026, he was elected to the American Philosophical Society.

== Education and personal life ==
Starr earned a B.A. from Columbia University in 1970 and a Ph.D. in sociology from Harvard University in 1978. Starr began his professional career at Harvard, where he was Assistant Professor (1978–1983) and Associate Professor (1983–1985), but after he was denied tenure at Harvard, he left for Princeton, where he has been since 1985.

Starr's first wife, Sandra Starr, died in 1998. Currently, Starr lives in Princeton, New Jersey and is married to Ann Baynes Coiro. He has four children and three stepchildren.

== Works ==
Starr's works have focused on politics, public policy, and social theory. However, within sociology, his work has focused on political sociology; institutional analysis; and how the sociology of knowledge, technology, and information affects democracy, equality, and freedom. Furthermore, he has written books relating to how policies affect health care, with works such as The Social Transformation of American Medicine, The Logic of Health Care Reform, and Remedy and Reaction: The Peculiar American Struggle over Health-Care Reform. In addition to his work on sociology, he has written works on the media, public, and liberalism, with works such as The Creation of the Media: Political Origins of Modern Communications and Freedom's Power.

According to Keith Wailoo et al. Starr's The Social Transformation of American Medicine

was an exploration of medical care that had unprecedented scope and narrative power, garnering the Bancroft Prize for American History, extensive praise from health care professionals, and the 1984 Pulitzer Prize for Nonfiction. Perhaps the most compelling attribute of The Social Transformation is its capacity to portray a coherent image of the complex worlds of health care and health policy. It did so, in large part, by effectively casting the evolving stories of American medicine and American society as reflections of one another.

The work was very widely and favorably reviewed. Soon it was adopted in university classes in diverse disciplines such as history, medicine, economics, sociology, political science, and law.

== Books ==
- American Contradiction: Revolution and Revenge from the 1950s to Now (Yale University Press, 2025).
- Defining the Age: Daniel Bell, His Time and Ours, edited with Julian Zelizer (Columbia University Press, 2021). "Introduction" pp 1-27
- Entrenchment: Wealth, Power, and the Constitution of Democratic Societies (Yale University Press, 2019).
- Remedy and Reaction: The Peculiar American Struggle over Health Care Reform (Yale University Press, 2011).
- Freedom's Power: The True Force of Liberalism (Basic Books, 2007).
- The Creation of the Media: Political Origins of Modern Communications (Basic Books, 2004). Goldsmith Book Prize.
- The Logic of Health Care Reform, rev. and enlarged edition (Penguin, 1994); orig. ed. (Grand Rounds Press, 1992).
- The Politics of Numbers: The Population of the United States in the 1980s (Russell Sage, 1987), edited with William Alonso.
- The Social Transformation of American Medicine (Basic Books, 1982 [actually published in January 1983]; 2nd ed. with new epilogue pub. 2017).
- The Discarded Army: Veterans After Vietnam (Charterhouse, 1974), assisted by James Henry and Raymond Bonner. Introduction by Ralph Nader.
- The University Crisis Reader, 2 vols., edited with Immanuel Wallerstein (Random House, 1971).
- Up Against the Ivy Wall, with Jerry Avorn and others (Atheneum, 1968).

== Awards and recognition ==
- Bancroft Prize for The Social Transformation of American Medicine
- C. Wright Mills Award for The Social Transformation of American Medicine
- Goldsmith Book Prize for The Creation of the Media - 2005
- James Hamilton Award of American College of Health Care Executives for The Social Transformation of American Medicine - 1984
- Pulitzer Prize for General Nonfiction for The Social Transformation of American Medicine - 1984
