= Mary P. Ryan =

American historian

- Education: University of Wisconsin–Madison; University of California, Santa Barbara
- Scientific career
- Fields: History

Mary P. Ryan is an American historian, and John Martin Vincent Professor of History at the Johns Hopkins University in Baltimore, Maryland. She is also Margaret Byrne Professor Emeritus of History, University of California, Berkeley.

== Life ==
She graduated from the University of Wisconsin–Madison, and from University of California, Santa Barbara with a PhD. She taught at Pitzer College, Binghamton University, University of California, Irvine.

== Awards ==
- 1982 Bancroft Prize
- 1990 Guggenheim Fellowship

== Works ==
- Womanhood in America. New York: New Viewpoints. 1975. ISBN 978-0-531-05365-2.
- Cradle of the Middle Class: The Families of Oneida County New York 1790–1865. Cambridge: Cambridge University Press. 1981. ISBN 978-0-521-27403-6.
- Empire of the mother: American writing about domesticity, 1830-1860. Harrington Park Press. 1985. ISBN 978-0-918393-18-0.
- Women in Public: Between Banners and Ballots, 1825–1880. Baltimore: Johns Hopkins University Press. 1990. ISBN 978-0-8018-3908-5.
- Civic Wars: Democracy and Public Life in American Cities During the 19th Century. Berkeley: University of California Press. 1997. ISBN 978-0-520-21660-0.
- "A Laudable Pride in the Whole of Us": City Halls as Civic Materialism" American Historical Review, October 2000.
- "The Election Mess", The New York Review of Books, February 8, 2001
- Mysteries of Sex: Tracing Women and Men through American History. UNC Press. 2006. ISBN 978-0-8078-3062-8.
- Taking the Land to Make the City: A Bicoastal History of North America. University of Texas Press. 2019. ISBN 978-1477317839.

=== Editor ===
- Judith Lowder Newton; Mary P. Ryan; Judith R. Walkowitz, eds. (1983). Sex and class in women's history. Routledge. ISBN 978-0-7100-9529-9.
