= Edward Countryman =

American historian (1944–2025)

Edward Countryman (July 31, 1944 – March 24, 2025) was an American historian known for his study of the American Revolution. He taught at Yale University, University of Canterbury, and Southern Methodist University.

== Life and career ==
Edward Francis Countryman Jr., born in Glens Falls, New York, on July 31, 1944, graduated from Manhattan College in 1966, and from Cornell University with an MA, and a Ph.D. in 1971.

He taught at Yale University, University of Canterbury, University of Warwick, University of Cambridge. Latterly, he was a Distinguished University Professor at Southern Methodist University from 1991 to 2022. According to the New York Times, his "wide-ranging studies of the various groups — politicians, laborers, Native Americans and more — at work during the American Revolution helped usher in a more complex understanding of the nation’s founding." He also promoted the idea that the American Revolution was a social revolution, with "elites forced to give ground to the working and farming classes."

Countryman was married to Evonne van Heussen, after a prior marriage ended in divorce. He had three children. He died in Dallas, Texas on March 24, 2025, at the age of 80.

== Awards ==
- 1983–1991 Royal Historical Society
- L.H.D. Honoris Causa Manhattan College
- 1982 Bancroft Prize for A People in Revolution
- 1966–1971 Danforth Graduate Fellow
- 1966–1967 Woodrow Wilson Fellow

== Works ==
- A People in Revolution: The American Revolution and Political Society in New York, 1760-1790. Johns Hopkins University Press. 1981. ISBN 9780801826252. OCLC 7551670. Reprinted as a paperback in 1989; see A People in Revolution: The American Revolution and Political Society in New York, 1760-1790. W. W. Norton. 1989. ISBN 9780393306064.
- The American Revolution. Hill & Wang. 1985. ISBN 978-0-8090-2562-6. Revised edition Macmillan, 2003 ISBN 978-0-8090-2562-6.
- Americans: A Collision of Histories. Hill & Wang. 1996. ISBN 978-0-8090-1598-6. Revised edition Macmillan, 1997, ISBN 978-0-8090-1598-6.
- Shane. British Film Institute. 1999. ISBN 978-0-85170-732-7. Co-author with Evonne von Heussen-Countryman.
- The Empire State, co-author, Cornell University Press, 2001
- Enjoy the Same Liberty: Black Americans and the Revolutionary Era. Rowman & Littlefield Publishers. 2012. ISBN 978-1-4422-0028-9.

=== Historians at Work, series editor ===
- What Did the Constitution Mean To Early Americans?. Bedford/St. Martin's. January 15, 1999. ISBN 978-0-312-18262-5.
- How Did American Slavery Begin?. Bedford/St. Martin's. January 15, 1999. ISBN 978-0-312-18261-8.
