= Institute of Native American Studies =

Coordinates: 33°57′20.2″N 83°22′41.6″W

The Institute of Native American Studies (INAS) was founded in 2004 at the University of Georgia in Athens, Georgia, to provide programming, instruction, and research support in Native American Studies.

INAS offers undergraduate and graduate certificates as well as courses related to Native Americans in the areas of archaeology, cultures, history, law and policy, and literature.
