= Atlantic history =

Branch of history and historiography of the European "age of discovery"

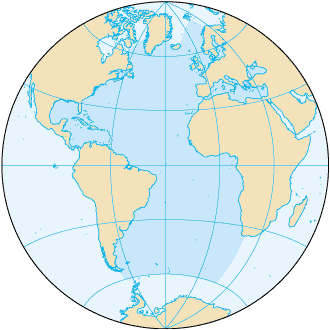
The Atlantic Ocean which gives its name to the so-called Atlantic World of the early modern period

Atlantic history is a specialty field in history that studies the Atlantic World in the early modern period. The Atlantic World was created by the contact between Europeans and the Americas, and Atlantic History is the study of that world. It is premised on the idea that, following the rise of sustained European contact with the New World in the 16th century, the continents that bordered the Atlantic Ocean—the Americas, Europe, and Africa—constituted a regional system or common sphere of economic and cultural exchange that can be studied as a totality.

Its theme is the complex interaction between Europe (especially Great Britain, France, Spain, and Portugal) and their colonies in the Americas. It encompasses a wide range of demographic, social, economic, political, legal, military, intellectual and religious topics treated in comparative fashion by looking at both sides of the Atlantic. Religious revivals in Britain and Germany are studies, as well as the First Great Awakening in the Thirteen Colonies. Emigration, race and slavery are also important topics.

Researchers of Atlantic history typically focus on the interconnections and exchanges between these regions and the civilizations they harbored. In particular, they argue that the boundaries between nation states which traditionally determined the limits of older historiography should not be applied to such transnational phenomena as slavery, colonialism, missionary activity and economic expansion. Environmental history and the study of historical demography also play an important role, as many key questions in the field revolve around the ecological and epidemiological impact of the Columbian exchange.

Robert R. Palmer, an American historian of the French Revolution, pioneered the concept in the 1950s with a wide-ranging comparative history of how numerous nations experienced what he called The Age of the Democratic Revolution: A Political History of Europe and America, 1760–1800 (1959 and 1964). In this monumental work, he did not compare the French and the American Revolutions as successful models against other types of revolutions. Indeed, he developed a wider understanding of the changes that were led by revolutionary processes across the Western civilization. Such work followed in the footsteps of C. L. R. James who, in the 1930s, connected the French and Haitian Revolutions. Since the 1980s Atlantic history has emerged as an increasingly popular alternative to the older discipline of imperial history, although it could be argued that the field is simply a refinement and reorientation of traditional historiography dealing with the interaction between early modern Europeans and native peoples in the Atlantic sphere. The organization of Atlantic History as a recognized area of historiography began in the 1980s under the impetus of American historians Bernard Bailyn of Harvard University and Jack P. Greene of Johns Hopkins University, among others. The post-World War II integration of the European Union and the continuing importance of NATO played an indirect role in stimulating interest throughout the 1990s.

== Development of the field ==
Bernard Bailyn's Seminar on the History of the Atlantic World promoted social and demographic studies, and especially regarding demographic flows of population into colonial America. As a leading advocate of the history of the Atlantic world, Bailyn has since 1995 organized an annual international seminar at Harvard designed to promote scholarship in this field. Professor Bailyn was the promoter of "The International Seminar on the History of the Atlantic World, 1500-1825" at Harvard University. This was one of the first, and most important, academic initiatives to launch the Atlantic perspective. From 1995 to 2010 the Atlantic History Seminar sponsored an annual meeting of young historians engaged in creative research on aspects of Atlantic History. In all, 366 young historians came through the Seminar program, 202 from universities in the US and 164 from universities abroad. Its purpose was to advance the scholarship of young historians of many nations interested in the common, comparative, and interactive aspects of the lives of the peoples in the lands that are part of the Atlantic basin, mainly in the early modern period in order to contribute to the study of this transnational historical subject.

Bailyn's Atlantic History: Concepts and Contours (2005) explores the borders and contents of the emerging field, which emphasizes cosmopolitan and multicultural elements that have tended to be neglected or considered in isolation by traditional historiography dealing with the Americas. Bailyn's reflections stem in part from his seminar at Harvard since the mid-1980s.

Other important scholars are Jack Greene, who directed a program at Johns Hopkins in Atlantic History from 1972 to 1992 that has now expanded to global concerns. Karen Ordahl Kupperman established the Atlantic Workshop at New York University in 1997.

Other scholars in the field include Ida Altman, Kenneth J. Andrien, David Armitage, Trevor Burnard, Jorge Canizares-Esguerra, Nicholas Canny, Philip D. Curtin, Laurent Dubois, J.H. Elliott, David Eltis, Alison Games, Eliga H. Gould, Anthony Grafton, Joseph C. Miller, Philip D. Morgan, Anthony Pagden, Jennifer L. Anderson, John Thornton, James D. Tracy, Carla G. Pestana, Isaac Land, Richard S. Dunn, and Ned C. Landsman.

== Perspectives ==
Alison Games (2006) explores the convergence of the multiple strands of scholarly interest that have generated the new field of Atlantic history, which takes as its geographic unit of analysis the Atlantic Ocean and the four continents that surround it. She argues Atlantic history is best approached as a slice of world history. The Atlantic, moreover, is a region that has logic as a unit of historical analysis only within a limited chronology. An Atlantic perspective can help historians understand changes within the region that a more limited geographic framework might obscure. Attempts to write a Braudelian Atlantic history, one that includes and connects the entire region, remain elusive, driven in part by methodological impediments, by the real disjunction that characterized the Atlantic's historical and geographic components, by the disciplinary divisions that discourage historians from speaking to and writing for each other, and by the challenge of finding a vantage point that is not rooted in any single place.

== Colonial studies ==
One impetus for Atlantic studies began in the 1960s with the historians of slavery who started tracking the routes of the transatlantic slave trade. A second source came from historians who studied the colonial history of the United States. Many were trained in early modern European history and were familiar with the historiography of the British Empire, which had been introduced a century before by George Louis Beer and Charles McLean Andrews. Historians studying colonialism have long been open to interdisciplinary perspectives, such as comparative approaches. In addition there was a frustration involved in writing about very few people in a small remote colony. Atlantic history opens the horizon to large forces at work over great distances.

== Criticism ==
Some critics have complained that Atlantic history is little more than imperial history under another name. It has been argued that it is too expansive in claiming to subsume both of the American continents, Africa, and Europe, without seriously engaging with them. According to Caroline Dodds Pennock, indigenous people are often seen as static recipients of transatlantic encounter, despite the fact that thousands of Native Americans crossed the ocean during the sixteenth century, some by choice.

Canadian scholar Ian K. Steele argued that Atlantic history will tend to draw students interested in exploring their country's historian beyond national myths, while offering historical support for such 21st century policies as the North American Free Trade Agreement (NAFTA), the Organization of American States (OAS), the North Atlantic Treaty Organization (NATO), the New Europe, Christendom, and even the United Nations (UN). He concludes, "The early modern Atlantic can even be read as a natural antechamber for American-led globalization of capitalism and serve as an historical challenge to the coalescing New Europe. No wonder that the academic reception of the new Atlantic history has been enthusiastic in the United States, and less so in Britain, France, Spain, and Portugal, where histories of national Atlantic empires continue to thrive."

== See also ==
- Biography and the Black Atlantic
- Columbian exchange
- Atlantic World
- Atlantic Ocean
- Piracy in the Atlantic World
- Atlantic hurricanes
- Atlantic Creole
- Transatlantic migrations
- Transatlantic relations
- Atlantic revolutions
- Atlanticism
- European colonization of the Americas

== Bibliography ==
- Altman, Ida. Emigrants and Society: Extremadura and Spanish America in the Sixteenth Century. Berkeley: University of California Press, 1989.
- Altman, Ida. Transatlantic Ties in the Spanish Empire: Brihuega, Spain, and Puebla, Mexico, 1560–1620. Stanford, CA: Stanford University Press, 2000.
- Altman, Ida and James J. Horn, eds. "To Make America": European Emigration in the Early Modern Period. Berkeley: University of California Press, 1991.
- Armitage, David, and Michael J. Braddick, eds., The British Atlantic World, 1500–1800 (2002); see especially the lead article by Armitage, "Three Concepts of Atlantic History."
- Anderson, Jennifer L. Mahogany: The Costs of Luxury in Early America (Cambridge: Harvard University Press, 2012).
- Bailyn, Bernard. Voyagers to the West: a passage in the peopling of America on the eve of the Revolution Knopf 1986, winner of the Pulitzer Prize in History
- Bailyn, Bernard. Atlantic History: Concept and Contours (2005). ISBN 978-0-674-01688-0.
- Bodle, Wayne. "Atlantic History Is the New 'New Social History.'" William and Mary Quarterly 2007 64(1): 203–220. ISSN 0043-5597
- Canny, Nicholas, and Philip Morgan, eds., The Oxford Handbook of the Atlantic World: 1450–1850 (2011)
- Curtin, Philip D. The Rise and Fall of the Plantation Complex: Essays in Atlantic History (1998) ISBN 0521629438
- Egerton, Douglas R. et al. The Atlantic World: A History, 1400–1888 (2007), college textbook; 530 pp.
- Elliott, John H. Empires of the Atlantic World: Britain and Spain in America 1492–1830 (2007), 608 pp., ISBN 030012399X.
- Eltis, David. The Rise of African Slavery in the Americas (2000).
- Fernlund, Kevin Jon. "American Exceptionalism or Atlantic Unity? Frederick Jackson Turner and the Enduring Problem of American Historiography." New Mexico Historical Review 2014 89 (3): 359–399.
- Klooster, Wim. The Dutch Moment: War, Trade, and Settlement in the Seventeenth-Century Atlantic World (2016)
- Klooster, Wim, and Gert Oostindie. Realm between Empires: The Second Dutch Atlantic, 1680-1815 (Cornell UP, 2018) 348 pp. pnline review
- Landsman, Ned C. Scotland and Its First American Colony, 1683–1765 (Princeton: Princeton University Press, 1985)
- Landsman, Ned C. Crossroads of Empire: The Middle Colonies in British North America (Baltimore: Johns Hopkins University Press, 2010).
- Games, Alison. "Atlantic History: Definitions, Challenges, and Opportunities." American Historical Review 2006 111(3): 741–757. doi:10.1086/ahr.111.3.741
- Games, Alison and Adam Rothman, eds. Major Problems in Atlantic History: Documents and Essays (2007), 544 pp.; primary and secondary sources
- Gerbner, Katharine. "Theorizing Conversion: Christianity, Colonization, and Consciousness in the Early Modern Atlantic World." History Compass (2015) 13#3, pp. 134–147.
- Gould, Eliga H. and Peter S. Onuf, eds. Empire and Nation: The American Revolution in the Atlantic World. Johns Hopkins University Press, 2005. 391 pages. excerpt and text search
- Gould, Eliga H. "Entangled Atlantic Histories: A Response from the Anglo-American Periphery," The American Historical Review, 112:1415–1422, December 2007 doi:10.1086/ahr.112.5.1415
- Greene, Jack P. and Philip D. Morgan, eds. Atlantic History: A Critical Appraisal (2009) 371 pp., major historiographical review
- Groesen, Michiel van, An Ocean of Rumours: News and Information in the Atlantic World. Cambridge 2026.
- Hancock, David. Citizens of the World: London Merchants and the Integration of the British Atlantic Community, 1735–1785 (1995)
- Mancke, Elizabeth, and Carole Shammas, eds. The Creation of the British Atlantic World. (2005). 408 pages. ISBN 0801880394.
- Miller, Joseph C., ed. The Princeton Companion to Atlantic History (2014) ASIN B00NRB9QVI
- Nagl, Dominik. No Part of the Mother Country, but Distinct Dominions – Law, State Formation and Governance in England, Massachusetts und South Carolina, 1630–1769 (2013).
- Olwell, Robert, and Alan Tully, eds. Cultures and Identities in Colonial British America. (2006). 394 pages.
- O'Reilly, William. "Genealogies of Atlantic History," Atlantic Studies 1 (2004): 66–84.
- Plank, Geoffrey. Atlantic Wars: From the Fifteenth Century to the Age of Revolution. (Oxford University Press, 2020).
- Polasky, Janet L. Revolutions without Borders (Yale UP, 2015). 392 pp. online review
- Rediker, Marcus. Between the Devil and the Deep Blue Sea: Merchant Seamen, Pirates, and the Anglo- American Maritime World, 1700–1750. (1987).
- Skeehan, Danielle C. The Fabric of Empire: Material and Literary Cultures of the Global Atlantic, 1650–1850 (Johns Hopkins University Press, 2020).
- Thornton, John. Africa and Africans in the Making of the Atlantic World, 1400–1800 (2nd ed., 1998)
- Wilson, Kathleen, ed. A New Imperial History: Culture, Identity and Modernity in Britain and the Empire (2004). 385 pp.
- Wilson, Kathleen, The Island Race: Englishness, Empire, and Gender in the. Eighteenth Century. London and New York: Routledge, 2003.
