= Biography and the Black Atlantic =

2013 book by Lisa A. Lindsay and John Wood Sweet

- Editor: Lisa A. Lindsay, John Wood Sweet
- Language: English
- Series: The Early Modern Americas
- Subject: Atlantic history
- Genre: Non-fiction, history
- Publisher: University of Pennsylvania Press
- Publication date: 2013 (Note: Kindle ebook published in 2014.)
- Pages: 384
- ISBN: 978-0-8122-4546-2
- Website: University of Pennsylvania Press

Biography and the Black Atlantic is a book edited by Lisa A. Lindsay and John Wood Sweet and published in 2013, by the University of Pennsylvania Press. The work examines biographies and autobiographies of African-descended individuals from the eighteenth and nineteenth centuries. These narratives offer personal insight into slavery and the African diaspora.

== Academic journal reviews ==
- Alexander, William H. "Lisa A. Lindsay and John Wood Sweet, eds., Biography and the Black Atlantic". The Journal of African American History. 100 (3): 522–525. doi:10.5323/jafriamerhist.100.3.0522.
- Bollettino, Maria Alessandra (2014). "Reviewed work: Biography and the Black Atlantic, Lisa A. Lindsay, John Wood Sweet". The Journal of American History. 101 (3): 912–913. doi:10.1093/jahist/jau533. JSTOR 44286342.
- Fogleman, Aaron Spencer (2015). "Reviewed work: Biography and the Black Atlantic. (Early Modern Americas), Lisa A. Lindsay, John Wood Sweet". The American Historical Review. 120 (5): 1856–1857. doi:10.1093/ahr/120.5.1856a. JSTOR 43697091.
- Fortin, Jeffrey A. (2014). "Atlantic Lives, Atlantic Sources". The Journal of African History. 55 (3): 500–501. doi:10.1017/S0021853714000474. JSTOR 43305223.
- Gould, Philip (2015). "Reviewed work: Biography and the Black Atlantic, LISA A. LINDSAY, JOHN WOOD SWEET". Early American Literature. 50 (1): 244–248. doi:10.1353/eal.2015.0017. JSTOR 24476624.
- Greene, Sandra E. (2015). "Reviewed work: Biography and the Black Atlantic, Lisa Lindsay, John Wood Sweet". African Studies Review. 58 (1): 259–261. doi:10.1017/asr.2015.20. JSTOR 43905022.
- Lovejoy, Paul E. (2015). "Reviewed work: Biography and the Black Atlantic, Lisa A. Lindsay, John Wood Sweet". The Journal of Interdisciplinary History. 45 (4): 606–607. doi:10.1162/JINH_r_00787. JSTOR 43829705.
- Sidbury, James; Lindsay, Lisa A.; Sweet, John Wood (2016). "Reviewed work: Biography and the Black Atlantic, LindsayLisa A., SweetJohn Wood". New West Indian Guide. 90 (3/4): 313–314. doi:10.1163/22134360-09003013. JSTOR 26552024.
- West, Elizabeth J. (2016). "Reviewed work: Biography and the Black Atlantic, Lisa A. Lindsay, John Wood Sweet". The Americas. 73 (2): 260–262. doi:10.1017/tam.2016.41. JSTOR 43897487.

== Publication history ==
- 2013, Hardcover edition.

== See also ==
- Atlantic history
- Atlantic slave trade
- Atlantic slave trade to Brazil
- Slavery in the United States
