= Wesley Logan Prize =

The Wesley Logan Prize is an annual prize given to a historian by the Association for the Study of Afro-American Life & History

== Background ==
The Wesley-Logan Prize is jointly sponsored by the American Historical Association and the Association for the Study of African American Life. The prize is awarded annually for an outstanding book in African diaspora history. The prize was established in 1992 in memory of two early pioneers in history, Charles H. Wesley and Rayford W. Logan.

== Eligibility ==
The nominated books must have been published between May 1 of the previous year and April 30 of the entry year.

== Notable winners ==
Past winners of the prize include:

- 2025 - Beeta Baghoolizadeh, The Color Black: Enslavement and Erasure in Iran
- 2024 - Joan Flores-Villalobos, The Silver Women: How Black Women’s Labor Made the Panama Canal
- 2023 - Shannen Dee Williams, Subversive Habits: Black Catholic Nuns in the Long African American Freedom Struggle
- 2022 - Yesenia Barragan, Freedom's Captives: Slavery and Gradual Emancipation on the Colombian Black Pacific
- 2021 - Jessica Marie Johnson, Wicked Flesh: Black Women, Intimacy, and Freedom in the Atlantic World
- 2020 - Benjamin Talton, In This Land of Plenty: Mickey Leland and Africa in American Politics
- 2019 - Yuko Miki, Frontiers of Citizenship: A Black and Indigenous History of Postcolonial Brazil
- 2018 - Monique Bedasse, Jah Kingdom: Rastafarians, Tanzania, and Pan-Africanism in the Age of Decolonization
- 2017 - Sowande' Mustakeem, Slavery at Sea: Terror, Sex, and Sickness in the Middle Passage
- 2016 - Carina Ray, 'Crossing the Color Line: Race, Sex, and the Contested Politics of Colonialism in Ghana
- 2015 - Ada Ferrer, Freedom’s Mirror: Cuba and Haiti in the Age of Revolution
- 2014 - Jacob S. Dorman, Chosen People: The Rise of American Black Israelite Religions
- 2013 - Martha Biondi, Black Revolution on Campus
- 2012 - Erik McDuffie, Sojourning for Freedom: Black Women, American Communism and the Making of Black Left Feminism
- 2011 - Frank Guridy, Forging Diaspora: Afro-Cuban and African Americans in a World of Empire and Jim Crow
- 2010 - Pier Larson, Ocean of Letters: Language and Creolization in an Indian Ocean Diaspora
- 2009 - Alexander Byrd, Captives and Voyagers: Black Migrants across the Eighteenth-Century British Atlantic World
- 2008 - Paul Johnson, Diaspora Conversions: Black Carib Religion and the Recovery of Africa
- 2007 - Laura Adderley, New Negroes from Africa': Slave Trade Abolition and Free African Settlement in the Nineteenth-Century Caribbean
- 2007 - Sylviane Diouf, Dreams of Africa in Alabama: The Slave Ship Clotilda and the Story of the Last Africans Brought to America
- 2006 - Kenneth M. Bilby, True-Born Maroons
- 2005 - Melvin Ely, Israel on the Appomattox: A Southern Experiment in Black Freedom from the 1790s through the Civil War
- 2004 - James Sweet, Recreating Africa: Culture, Kinship, and Religion in the African-Portuguese World
- 2003 - Leslie M. Harris, In the Shadows of Slavery: African Americans in New York City
- 2002 - Julie Winch, A Gentleman of Color: The Life of James Forten
- 2001 - Eric Arnesen, Brotherhoods of Color: Black Railroad Workers and the Struggle for Equality
- 2000 - David Eltis, The Rise of African Slavery in the Americas
- 1999 - Kim Butler, Freedoms Given, Freedoms Won: Afro-Brazilians in Post-Abolition San Paulo and Salvador
- 1998 - Philip D. Morgan, Slave Counterpoint: Black Culture in the Eighteenth-Century Chesapeake and Lowcountry
- 1997 - W. Jeffrey Bolster, Black Jacks: African American Seamen in the Age of Sail
- 1997 - Brenda Plummer, Rising Wind: Black Americans and U.S. Foreign Aid
- 1996 - Gretchen Lemke-Santangelo, Abiding Courage: African American Migrant Women and the East Bay Community
- 1995 - Aline Helg, Our Rightful Share: The Afro-Cuban Struggle for Equality
- 1994 - Richard Thomas, Life for Us Is What We Make It: Building Black Community in Detroit

== See also ==
- List of history awards
