= Shammas =

Shammas is a surname and given name. Notable people with the name include:

== Surname ==
- Anton Shammas (born 1950), Palestinian writer and poet
- Carole Shammas (born 1943), American historian, academic, and author
- Hazem Shammas, Palestinian-Australian actor
- Daniel Shammas, Senior Vice President, Rocket Mortgage

== Given name ==
- Shammas Malik, American politician and lawyer
