= Ira Berlin =

American historian (1941–2018)

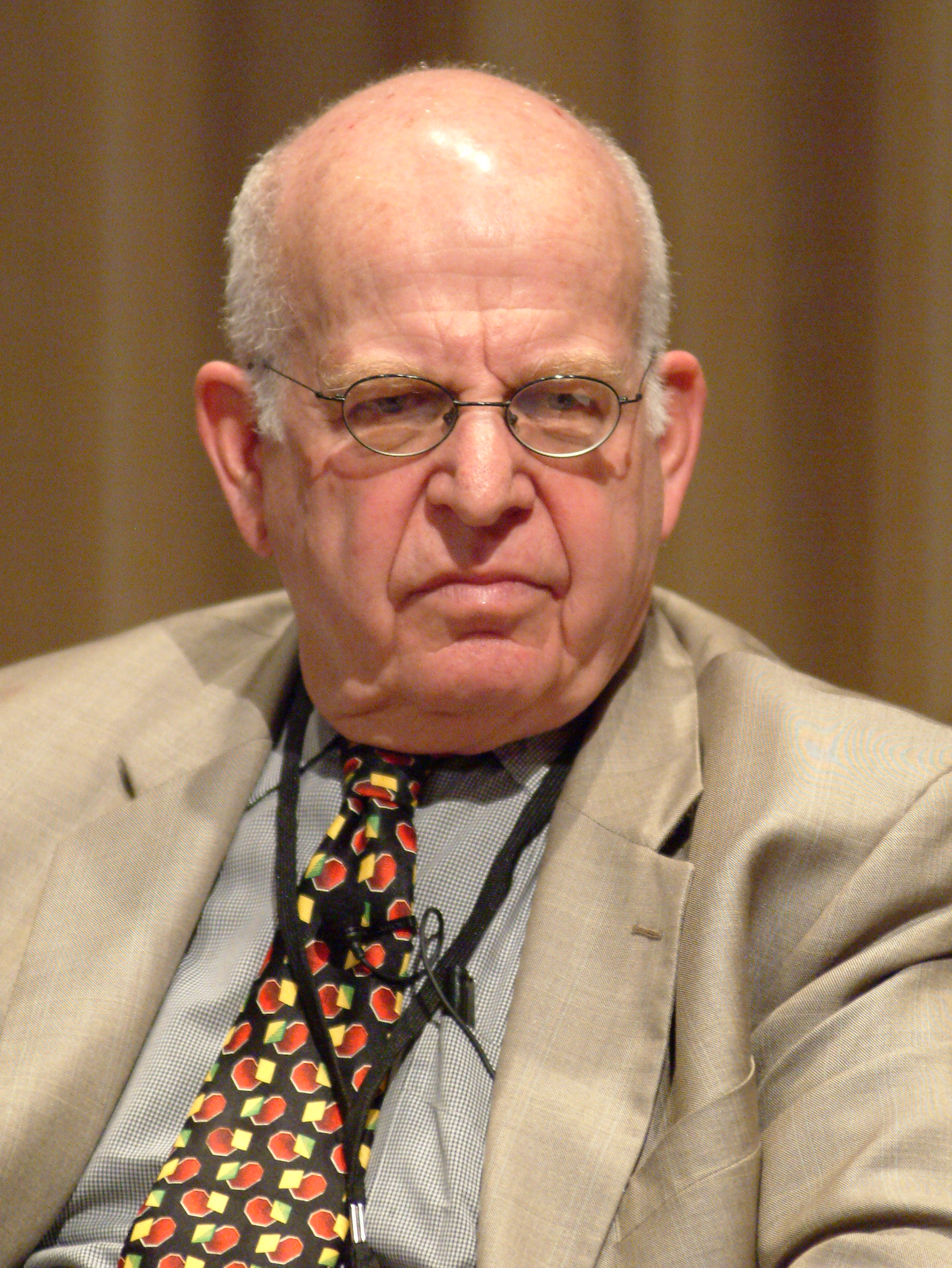
- Berlin in 2008
- Born: May 27, 1941
- Died: June 5, 2018 (aged 77)

Academic background
- Education: University of Wisconsin–Madison

Academic work
- Institutions: University of Maryland
- Doctoral students: Jessica Marie Johnson

Ira Berlin (May 27, 1941 – June 5, 2018) was an American historian, professor of history at the University of Maryland, and former president of Organization of American Historians.

Berlin wrote the books Many Thousands Gone: The First Two Centuries of Slavery in North America (1998) and Generations of Captivity: A History of African-American Slaves (2003).

== Biography ==
Berlin grew up in Bronx, New York, and received his Ph.D. from the University of Wisconsin–Madison in 1970. He wrote extensively on American history and the larger Atlantic world in the 18th and 19th centuries. Berlin focused in particular on the history of slavery in the United States. His first book, Slaves Without Masters: The Free Negro in the Antebellum South (1974), was awarded the Best First Book Prize by the National Historical Society.

Berlin's work is concerned with what he termed the "striking diversity" in African-American life under slavery. He argues that this diversity is especially evident with attention to the differences in African-American life under slavery across geography and time. In his 1998 book Many Thousands Gone, which covers the history of North American slavery through the 18th century, Berlin differentiates among four regions and their respective forms of slavery: the Chesapeake, the Lowcountry of South Carolina and Georgia, the Lower Mississippi Valley, and the North. He further differentiates each of these regions across three distinct "generations," emphasizing shifts over time. Berlin argues that geographic and temporal differences in the first two centuries of North American slavery had important consequences for African American culture and society.

He founded the Freedmen and Southern Society Project and was director until 1991. The project's multi-volume Freedom: A Documentary History of Emancipation has twice been awarded the Thomas Jefferson Prize of the Society for the History of the Federal Government, as well as the J. Franklin Jameson Prize of the American Historical Association for outstanding editorial achievement (October, 1999). He was elected a Fellow of the American Academy of Arts and Sciences in 2004.

In 2003, Berlin was the chief advisor for the HBO documentary Unchained Memories. In 2007, he was an advising scholar for the award-winning PBS documentary Prince Among Slaves.

== Selected bibliography ==
- Slaves Without Masters: The Free Negro in the Antebellum South (1974) ISBN 978-1-59558-173-0 Tells the story of the free black men and women who lived in the South before the Civil War.
- Freedom: A Documentary History of Emancipation, 1861-1867 (1982) Selections from the holdings of the National Archives; series one, volume three, The Wartime Genesis of Free Labor: The Lower South, edited by Ira Berlin, Thavolia Glymph, Steven F. Miller, Joseph P. Reidy, Leslie S. Rowland and Julie Saville.
- The Black Military Experience (Cambridge University Press, 1985) ISBN 978-0-521-22984-5 Collection of first-hand accounts from the National Archives.
- Slavery and Freedom in the Age of the American Revolution, edited by Ira Berlin and Ronald Hoffman (University of Illinois Press, 1986) Essays.
- Cultivation and Culture: Labor and the Shaping of Slave Life in the Americas, edited by Ira Berlin and Philip D. Morgan (Carter G. Woodson Institute Series in Black Studies, University Press of Virginia, 1993) ISBN 978-0-8139-1424-4 Essays.
- Families and Freedom: A Documentary History of African-American Kinship in the Civil War Era, edited by Ira Berlin and Leslie S. Rowland (New Press, 1996) ISBN 978-1-56584-026-3
- Many Thousands Gone: The First Two Centuries of Slavery in North America (Harvard University Press, 1998) ISBN 978-0-67400-211-1 1999 Bancroft Prize from Columbia University; 1999 Elliott Rudwick Prize of the Organization of American Historians; 1999 Frederick Douglass Prize for the Best Book on Slavery; 1998 Association of American Publishers Professional/Scholarly Publishing Annual Award in the category of History; 1998 Los Angeles Times Book Prize; finalist for the 1998 National Book Critics Circle Award for nonfiction; co-recipient of the 1999 Southern Historical Association Frank L. and Harriet C. Owsley Award.
- Generations of Captivity: A History of African American Slaves (Harvard University Press, 2003) 2003 Albert J. Beveridge Award of the American Historical Association; Anisfeld-Wolf Book Award for nonfiction.
- The Making of African America: The Four Great Migrations (Viking, 2010)
- The Long Emancipation: The Demise of Slavery in the United States (Harvard University Press, 2015)

== Filmography ==
Film
Year	Film	Role	Other notes
2005	Slavery and the Making of America, PBS	Academic Advisor	
2003	Unchained Memories	Chief advisor	
2007	Prince Among Slaves	Advising scholar	
