= Kim Butler =

American author and historian

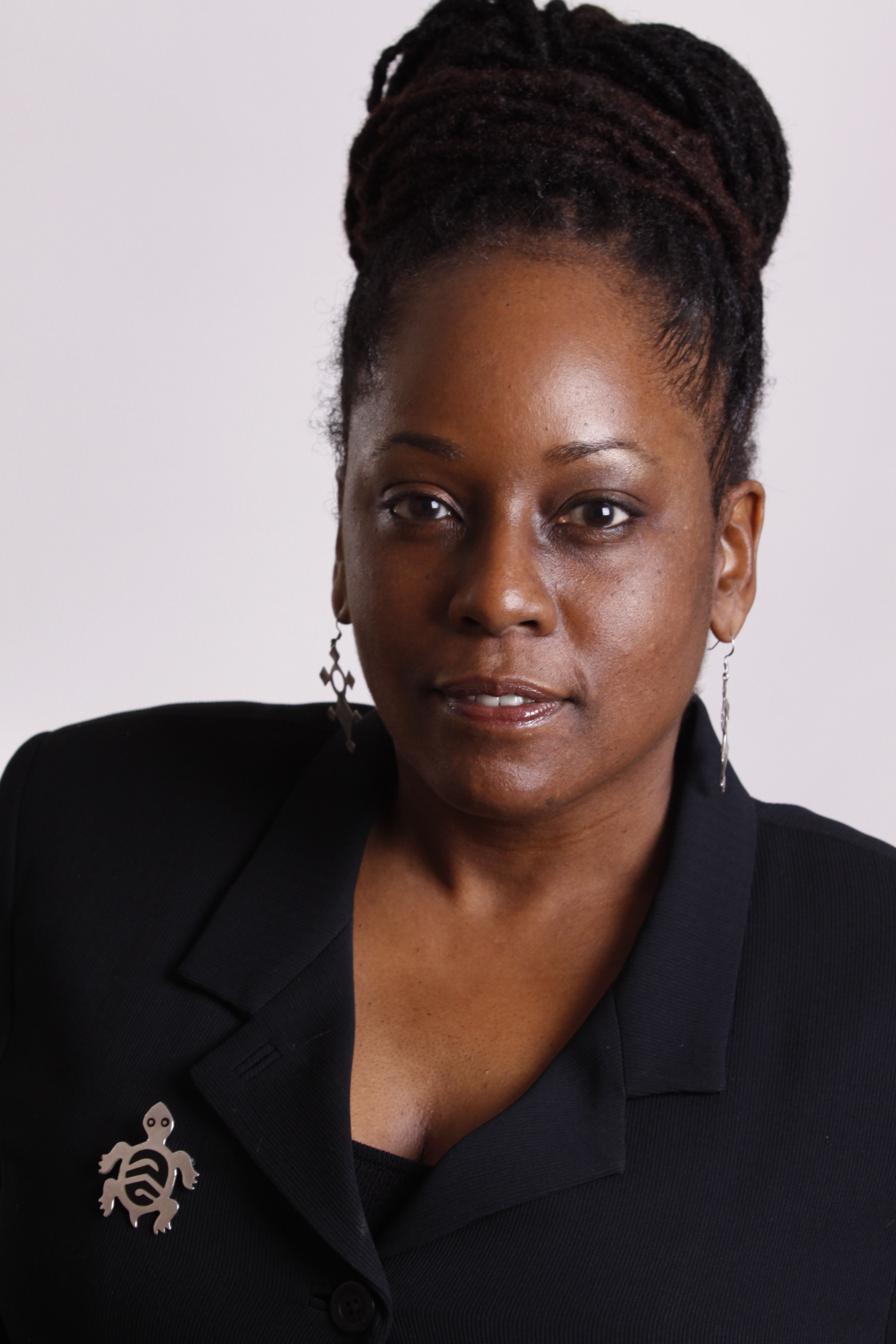
Kim D. Butler

Kim D. Butler (born 1960) is an American author and historian.

Butler was awarded a PhD from Johns Hopkins University in 1996.

Her first book, Freedoms Given, Freedoms Won: Afro-Brazilians in Post-Abolition São Paulo and Salvador, was published in 1998 by Rutgers University Press. It won the American Historical Association's Wesley Logan Prize and the Association of Black Women Historians' Letitia Woods Brown Prize. Currently, Butler is an associate professor of history in the Africana Studies department at Rutgers University. She was the third President of the Association for the Study of the Worldwide African Diaspora (ASWAD) 2011–2015. She was named a Fulbright Scholar in 2014.
