= Transatlantic migration =

Movement of people across the Atlantic Ocean

Transatlantic migration refers to the movement of people across the Atlantic Ocean in order to settle on the continents of North and South America. It usually refers to migrations after Christopher Columbus' voyage to the Americas in 1492. For earlier Transatlantic crossings, see: Norse colonization of North America and Theory of Phoenician discovery of the Americas.

== 16th to 18th century ==
- The European colonization of the Americas—from 1836 to 1914, over 30 million Europeans migrated to the United States.
- The Puritan migration to New England
- The forced migration of Africans: See Slave trade and Atlantic slave trade
- The Spanish colonization of the Americas

== 19th century onward ==
Among the various transatlantic migrations, the period between the mid-19th century and the early 20th century marks the “Age of Mass Migration,” during which 40% of U.S. population growth was due to immigrant inflows. Economic theory sought to explain whether immigrants were positively or negatively selected from the sending pool into the United States.

Ingrid Semmingsen in her book, Norway to America: a History of the Migration, wrote “Many have asked if it was the more capable, the more enterprising and energetic persons who left, or if it was those who fell behind in the struggle for bread, the losers, the maladjusted, and the deviant” in reference to the composition of those who migrated into the United States.

The Roy model of comparative advantage suggests that when skilled workers earn higher wages in one location, the most able will migrate to that country and earn that income. Moreover, if wages are higher for unskilled workers in one location, the least able will leave their own country to earn that income.

As a result of transportation improvements following the Industrial Revolution, long-distance migration increased in the 19th century. For example, the duration of the Atlantic passage fell from 5 weeks (1725) to one week (1900). In addition, the length of indentured servitude necessary to pay for the fare decreased from 4 years to approximately 4 weeks, substantially decreasing one of the main deterrents for making the trek. Between 1846 and 1940, some 55 million migrants moved from Europe to America. 65% went to the United States. Other major receiving countries were Argentina, Canada, Brazil and Uruguay. Also, 2.5 million Asians migrated to the Americas, mostly to the Caribbean (where they worked as indentured servants in plantations) and some, notably the Japanese, to Brazil and the USA.

== See also ==
- Columbian exchange
- Mass migration
- Immigration to the United States
- Transatlantic relations
- Transatlantic slave trade (forced migration across the Atlantic Ocean)
- Pre-Columbian trans-oceanic contact theories
- Age of Sail
- Atlantic World
- Atlantic Creole
- Atlantic history
