= Martha Biondi =

American historian

- Partner: James Thindwa
- Awards: Wesley Logan Prize (2013); Gustavus Myers Outstanding Book Award (2004)

Academic background
- Education: Barnard College (BA); Columbia University (MA, PhD)

Academic work
- Discipline: African American history
- Institutions: Northwestern University

Martha Biondi is an American historian. She is the Lorraine H. Morton Professor of African American Studies and Professor of History at Northwestern University.

== Biography ==
Biondi was raised in Connecticut. She received her B.A. from Barnard College, and her M.A. and Ph.D. from Columbia University. Her specialization is 20th-century African American history with a focus on social movements. She served as chair of Northwestern University's African American studies department.

Biondi won the Wesley Logan Prize from the American Historical Association and the Association for the Study of African American Life for her book, The Black Revolution on Campus (2014), which documented the history of black student activism in American campuses. She also received a 2004 Gustavus Myers Outstanding Book Award for her book, To Stand and Fight: the Struggle for Civil Rights in Postwar New York City (2003).

She was the partner of James Thindwa until his death.
