= Influence of the American Revolution on the French Revolution =

Impact of 18th century rebellion on another

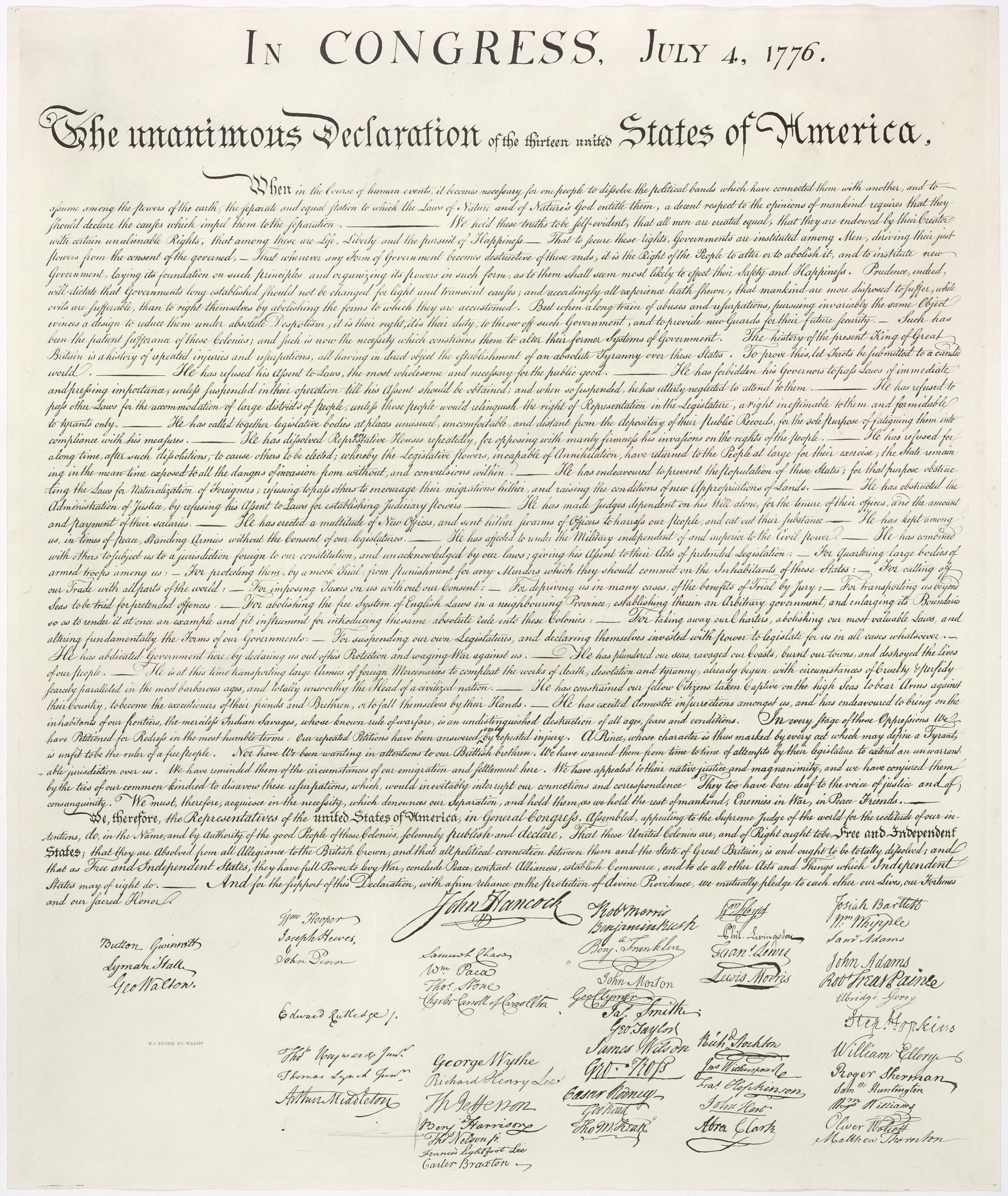
The United States Declaration of Independence.

The American Revolution (1775–1783) influenced the French Revolution (1789–1799), both ideologically and politically. In fact, the two Revolutions were linked in a process of two-way, trans-Atlantic communication that began with the Enlightenment and continued during both revolutions.

The two Revolutions were very different – the American Revolution focused mainly on freeing the country from colonial domination, while the French Revolution targeted a thorough make-over of French society, including overturning what was already a failing monarchy.

Despite the differences, the success of the American Revolution was influential for France. It demonstrated that monarchical power could be successfully challenged and replaced with a republic. This emboldened French citizens who were disillusioned with the monarchy and the class structure of the ancien régime. American success helped validate the idea of popular uprising and offered a practical example of how a new, more just government might be constructed. In addition, key American documents (for example, the United States Declaration of Independence) provided inspiration for French documents.

== Exchange of ideas ==
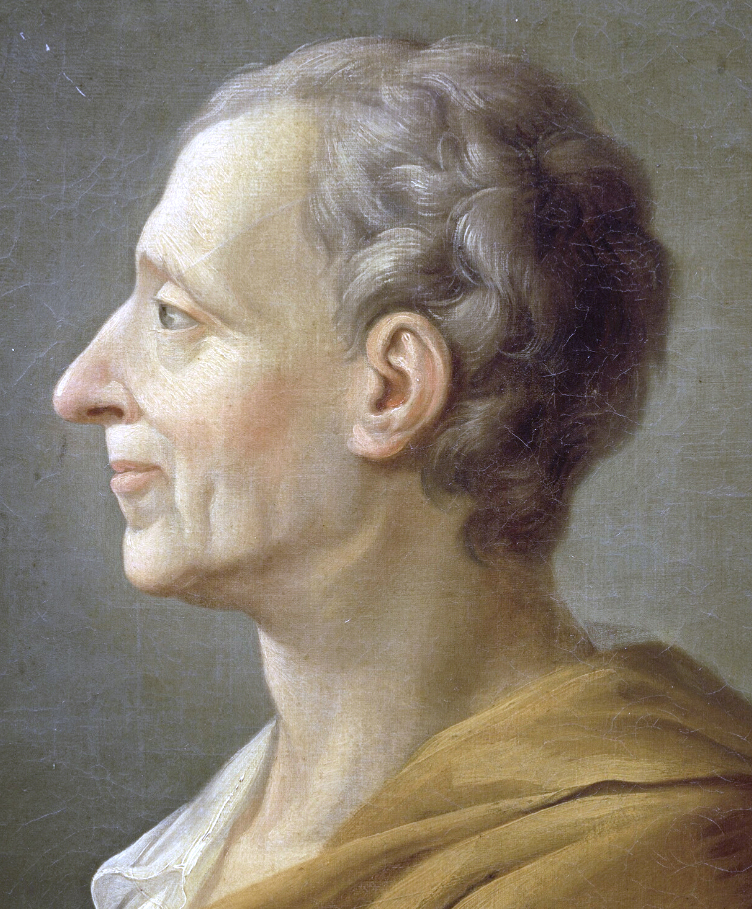
Montesquieu, portrait by an anonymous artist

The sharing of ideas between the two revolutions (and, indeed, other revolutions in Europe and the Americas) is often seen as part of a broader network of communication linking the societies of the ‘Atlantic world’– that is, an ‘Atlantic network of ideas and actors.’ Revolution was ‘in the air’, with the American Revolution being the first in a long line of revolutions in Europe and Latin America.

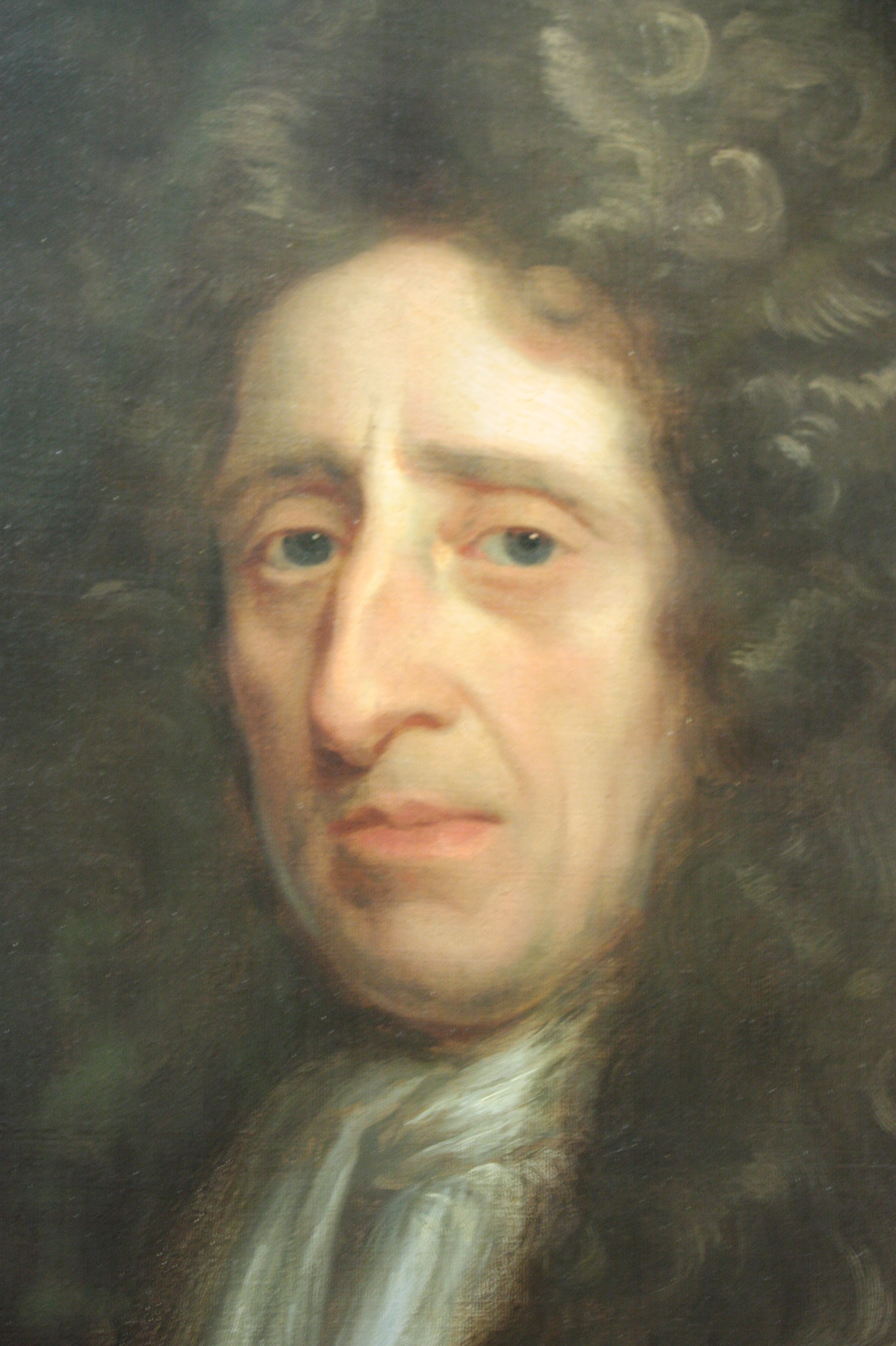
John Locke's portrait by Godfrey Kneller, National Portrait Gallery, London

Supported by the emergence of global trade, the communication of revolutionary ideas within this network began with the Age of the Enlightenment. Enlightenment ideals such as natural rights, popular sovereignty, and the social contract were central to both revolutions. French and American intellectuals and revolutionaries drew heavily from thinkers like John Locke, Jean-Jacques Rousseau, and Montesquieu. Thus, even at a time when the East-West crossing of the Atlantic took 45 days, political discourse was quite cosmopolitan.

The crux of the influence of the American Revolution on France was that its success opened avenues for enacting these philosophical principles. Thus, it served as the first ‘real world’ test case of Enlightenment ideas. Moreover, key American documents such as the Declaration of Independence (1776) and the U.S. Constitution (1787) served as inspiration for French reformers and revolutionaries. French reformers also examined the constitutions of American states and were particularly interested in the constitution of Pennsylvania, which created a unicameral legislature. The Declaration of the Rights of Man and of the Citizen (1789), a foundational document of the French Revolution, was directly influenced by the United States Declaration of Independence which itself was inspired by the ideas of the European Enlightenment. These documents demonstrated how new political systems could be founded on Enlightenment ideals.

== Other influences ==
In addition to contributing ideas and confidence in revolutionary success, the American Revolution influenced the French Revolution in a number of other direct and indirect ways:

- Thousands of French troops were deployed to fight in the American revolution. These soldiers returned to France with fresh perspectives on societies without aristocracies and on the viability of revolutions.
- The French financial crisis was the immediate factor that precipitated the French Revolution. This financial crisis was in part due to France’s global war with Great Britain, of which its participation in the American Revolution was a major part.
- Important actors in the American Revolution were in France during the French Revolution. In some cases, they were given French citizenship and invited to participate in the political process, including in the drafting of key documents.

=== Return of French soldiers who fought in the American Revolution ===
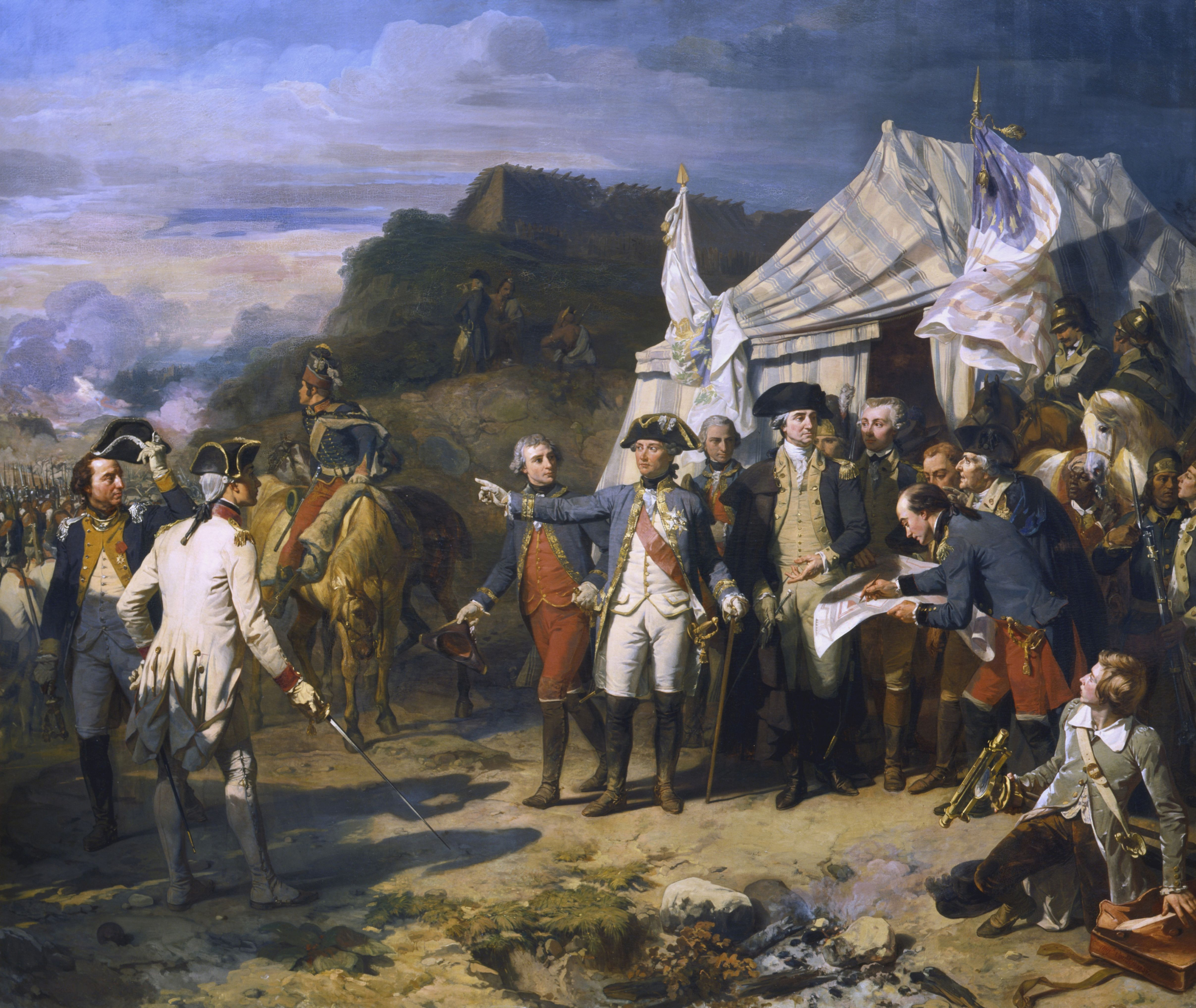
Siège de Yorktown, a c. 1836 Auguste Couder (Note: Conserved in the Galerie des Batailles, Château de Versailles, France. A copy is displayed at the Colonial National Historical Park Visitors' Center in Yorktown.) Rochambeau (center L), Washington (center R), Marquis de La Fayette (behind Washington, R), Marquis de Saint Simon (behind Washington, L), Duke of Lauzun (L, mounted) and Comte de Ménonville (R of Washington).

France played a crucial military and financial role in the American Revolution, allying itself against the British and with the North American colonies in 1778. Thousands of French soldiers and officers served in the war, including at the decisive battle of the siege of Yorktown. As stated in one analysis, the ‘incongruity of an absolute monarchy fighting in defense of a republic founded on universal male suffrage (excluding slaves) was not lost on many commentators in France and Europe.’

Upon returning home, many French veterans brought back revolutionary ideals and a belief in the possibility of successful rebellion against an established monarchy. Two academic analyses of the pattern of return of these soldiers to the French provinces shows that they did indeed play a more militant role in fomenting revolution in their regions than soldiers who had not been deployed to fight in the American Revolution.

=== Financial crisis of the French state ===
The French monarchy under Louis XVI was heavily in debt, in part due to its financial support of the American Revolution. In all the French spent 1.3 billion livres to support the Americans directly in addition to the money it spent fighting Britain on land and sea outside the U.S. The financial cost of the war significantly worsened France’s fiscal situation, contributing to the more general economic crisis that triggered the Revolution by causing economic hardship, social inequality, and political discontent. Specifically, the financial crisis and the measures taken by the King to address it were the events that immediately preceded and precipitated the opening shots of 1789.

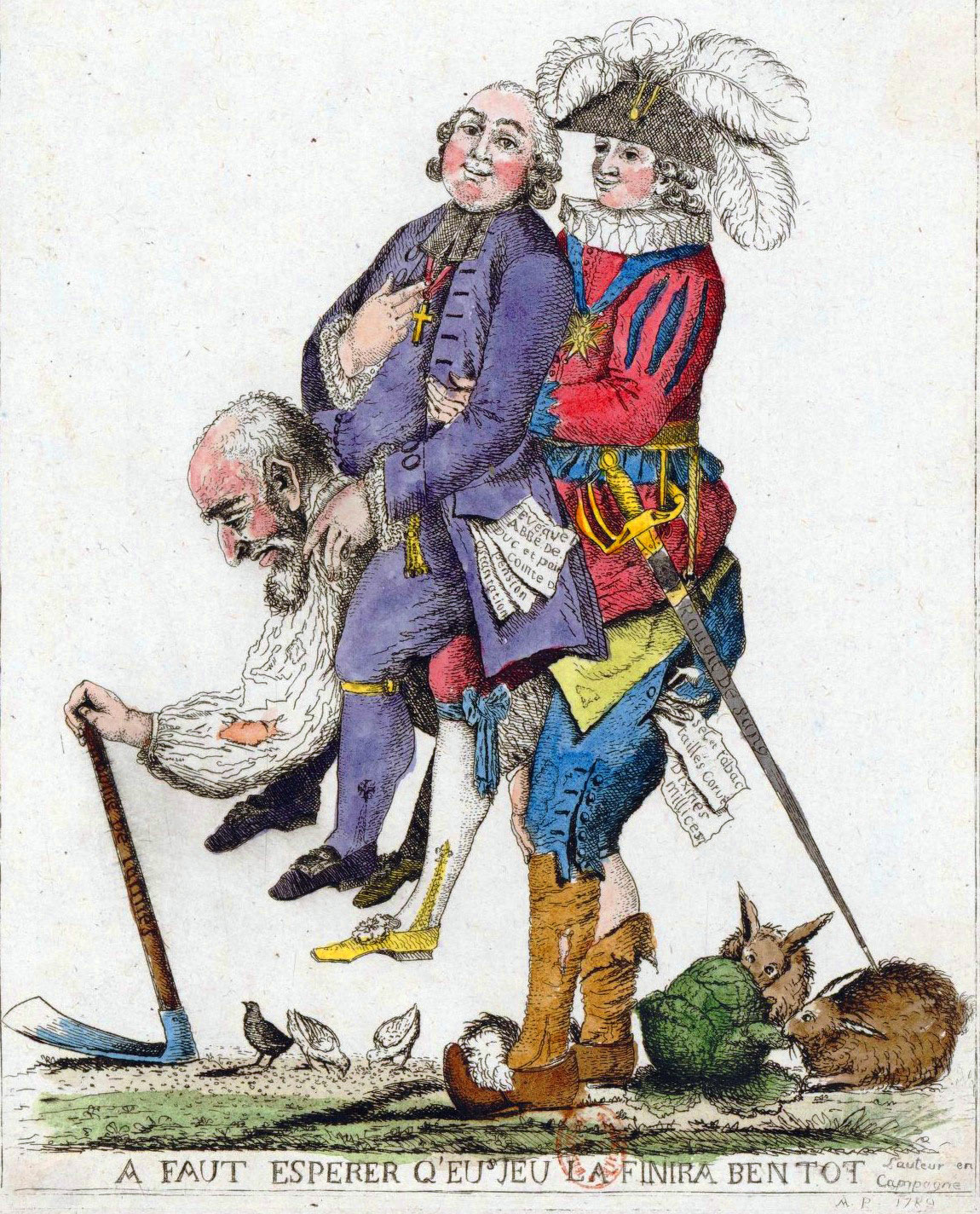
A prerevolutionary cartoon showing the Third Estate carrying on his back the Second Estate (the nobility) and the First Estate (the clergy)

After several unsuccessful attempts to resolve the financial crisis, the King was persuaded in May 1789 to convene the Estates-General with the objective of finding a solution to the crisis. The Estates-General consisted of three estates – the clergy, the nobility, and the commoners – and had not met since 1614. This body was unable to resolve the crisis.

The King then tried, but did not succeed, to disband it and was later forced to reverse his decision. The Third Estate ultimately declared itself to be the National Assembly, a legislative body, without bothering to seek the King’s approval. This further undermined his authority. At the same time, the National Assembly was unable to address the concerns of the Parisian masses, who were suffering from food shortages and high prices.

In July 1789, the masses attacked and took the Bastille, the event that marks the beginning of the French Revolution. As summarized by a French scholar, Florin Aftalion, ‘so it was that the fiscal history of the Ancien Régime led directly to the Revolution. The latter arose because the Estates-General was summoned as a last resort, when the crisis in the Treasury had finally proved to be unsolvable.’^{:30}

=== Presence of Americans in France during the Revolution ===
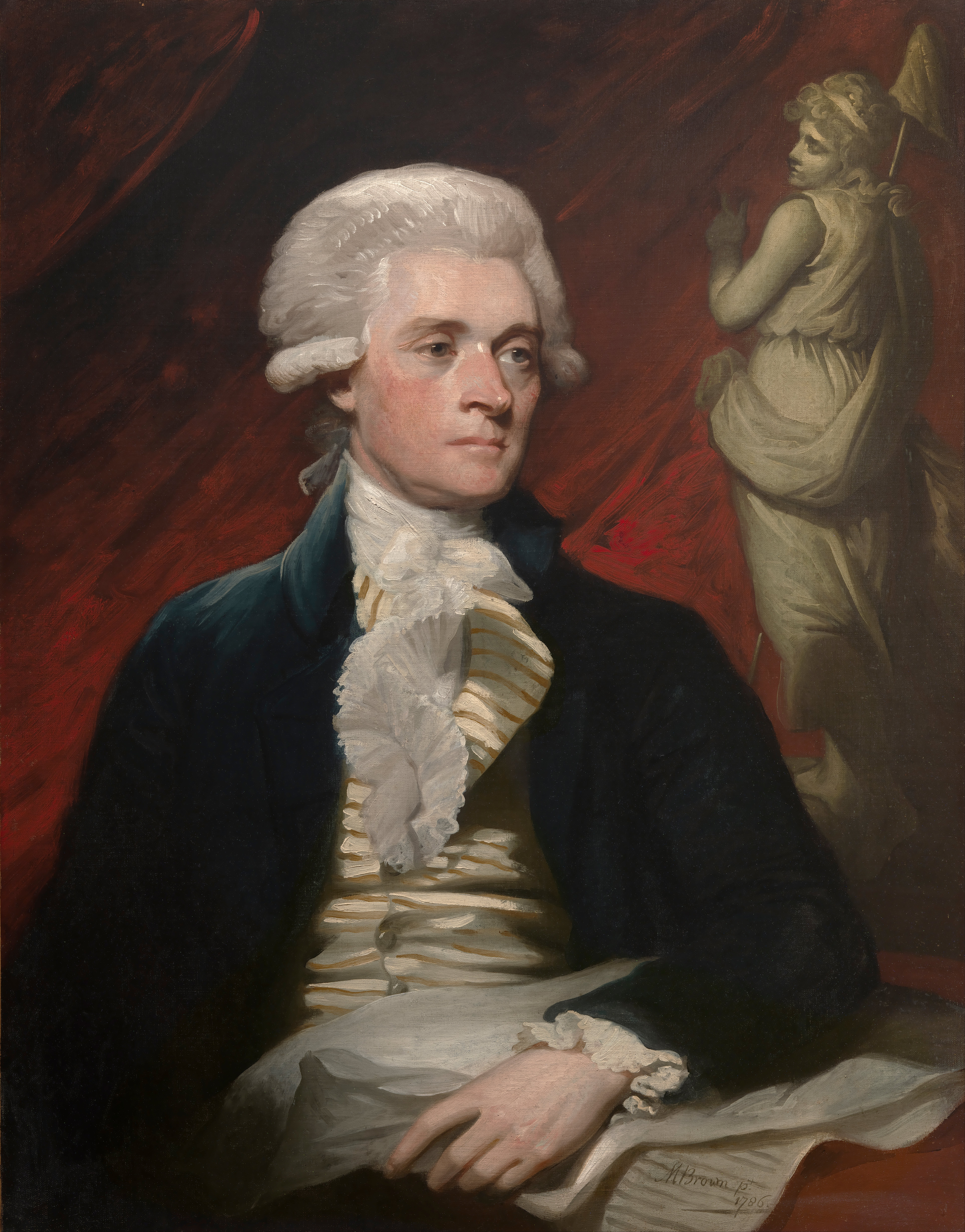
1786 portrait of Thomas Jefferson by Mather Brown

A number of influential Americans were present in France during the Revolution. The most noteworthy of these were Thomas Jefferson, Gouverneur Morris and Thomas Paine. Thomas Jefferson was the American Minister Plenipotentiary from May 1785 to September 1789. Morris was a businessman who was in Paris to help salvage a friend’s tobacco business, to sell western tracts of land and to find private investors to purchase war debt from the insolvent French government. He was later named Minister Plenipotentiary to France, a post he occupied from 1792 to 1794. He was the only high American official to remain in France during the Reign of Terror.

Both Jefferson and Morrison attended prestigious salons in Paris and proffered advice to influential Frenchmen. Jefferson, along with other prominent Americans, was consulted by the Marquis de Lafayette on his first draft of the Declaration of the Rights of Man. Jefferson urged Lafayette and other nobles, including Adrienne Catherine de Noailles, to take a moderate democratizing approach. In practice, however, their influence on the rapid unfolding of revolutionary events was marginal – the attention of the French revolutionaries that they might have influenced was focused elsewhere.^{:17-18}

==== Thomas Paine ====
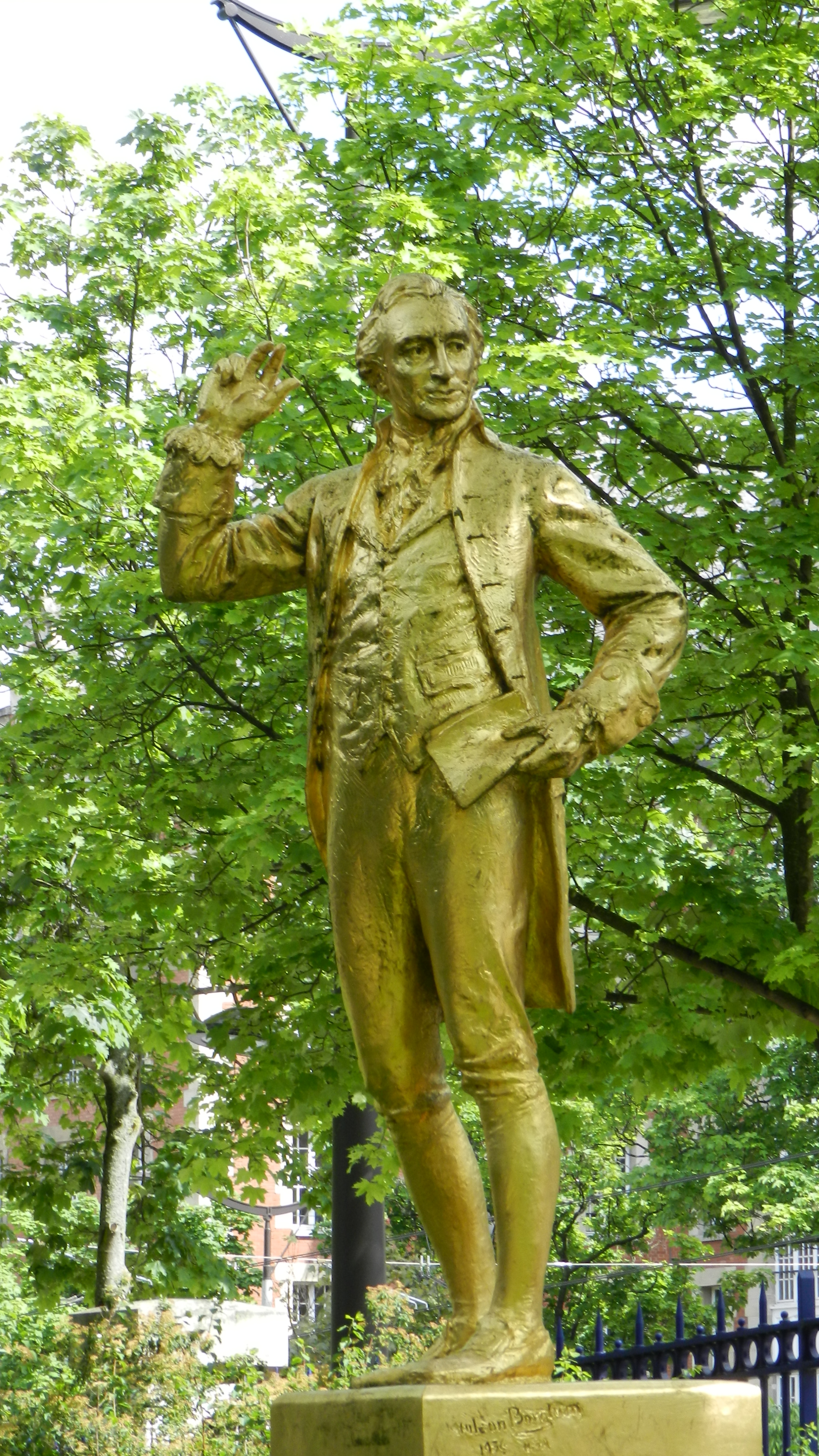
Statue of Thomas Paine in the Parc Montsouris, Paris, dedicated in 1948

Thomas Paine played a direct role in the French Revolution and came close to being guillotined.^{:83} In 1792, the Legislative Assembly made Paine an honorary French citizen in recognition of the publishing of his Rights of Man, Part II.^{:62} He was elected as a deputy to the National Convention and was one of nine members of a group charged with drafting a constitution. His draft had decidedly Girondin overtones (that is, he revealed himself to be a moderate within the revolutionary movement).^{:1} He opposed the execution of the King, preferring that he be exiled to the United States. This placed him firmly in the camp of the Girondins, who were soon to be purged as counter-revolutionaries during the Terror.

In late December 1793, Paine was expelled from the National Convention and was arrested by the Council of Public Security under a law ordering the arrest of all foreign nationals of countries that were at war with France on the grounds that they were agents of foreign powers (in this, Paine was treated as a British national).^{:84}. Gouvernour Morris did little to effect his release. After Morris was replaced as minister, his successor, James Monroe, secured Paine’s release by arguing that he was an American citizen. Though in poor health due to his prison stay, Paine was reinstated to the Convention. He was one of only three députés to oppose the adoption of the new 1795 constitution, because it eliminated universal suffrage, which had been proclaimed (for men) by the Montagnard Constitution of 1793.

== See also ==
- Age of Revolution
- France in the American Revolutionary War
