= James Thindwa =

Community organiser (1955–2020)

James Thindwa (1955–2020) was a community organizer in the Chicago, Illinois area. He heads Chicago Jobs with Justice, where he organizes for workers rights. He was born to Malawian parents in Zimbabwe.

Thindwa attended Berea College, where he was a scholarship recipient and went on to earn a master's degree at Miami University in Ohio.

He joined Chicago Alliance of Charter Teachers and Staff (Chicago ACTS) in June 2009.

He is on the board of directors and a contributor to newsmagazine In These Times, a nonprofit and independent newsmagazine committed to political and economic democracy.

Thindwa was the featured subject on PBS's Bill Moyers Journal. He was the partner of Martha Biondi, a professor of African American studies at Northwestern University.

== Awards ==
Howard M. Metzenbaum Award 2010.
