= W. Jeffrey Bolster =

American historian

W. Jeffrey Bolster is a professor emeritus of history at the University of New Hampshire in the United States, and the author of The Mortal Sea: Fishing the Atlantic in the Age of Sail, which won the 2013 Bancroft Prize in history of the Americas, and the 2013 Albert J. Beveridge Award. He also wrote Black Jacks: African American Seamen in the Age of Sail which won the 1997 Wesley Logan Prize of the American Historical Association.

== Biography ==
Bolster received a BA degree from Trinity College in 1976, a MA from Brown University in 1984, and a PhD from Johns Hopkins University in 1992.

== Awards ==
- Roger Revelle Lecture (2018)
