= Age of Revolution =

Period in the 18th century

- Part of the Age of Enlightenment
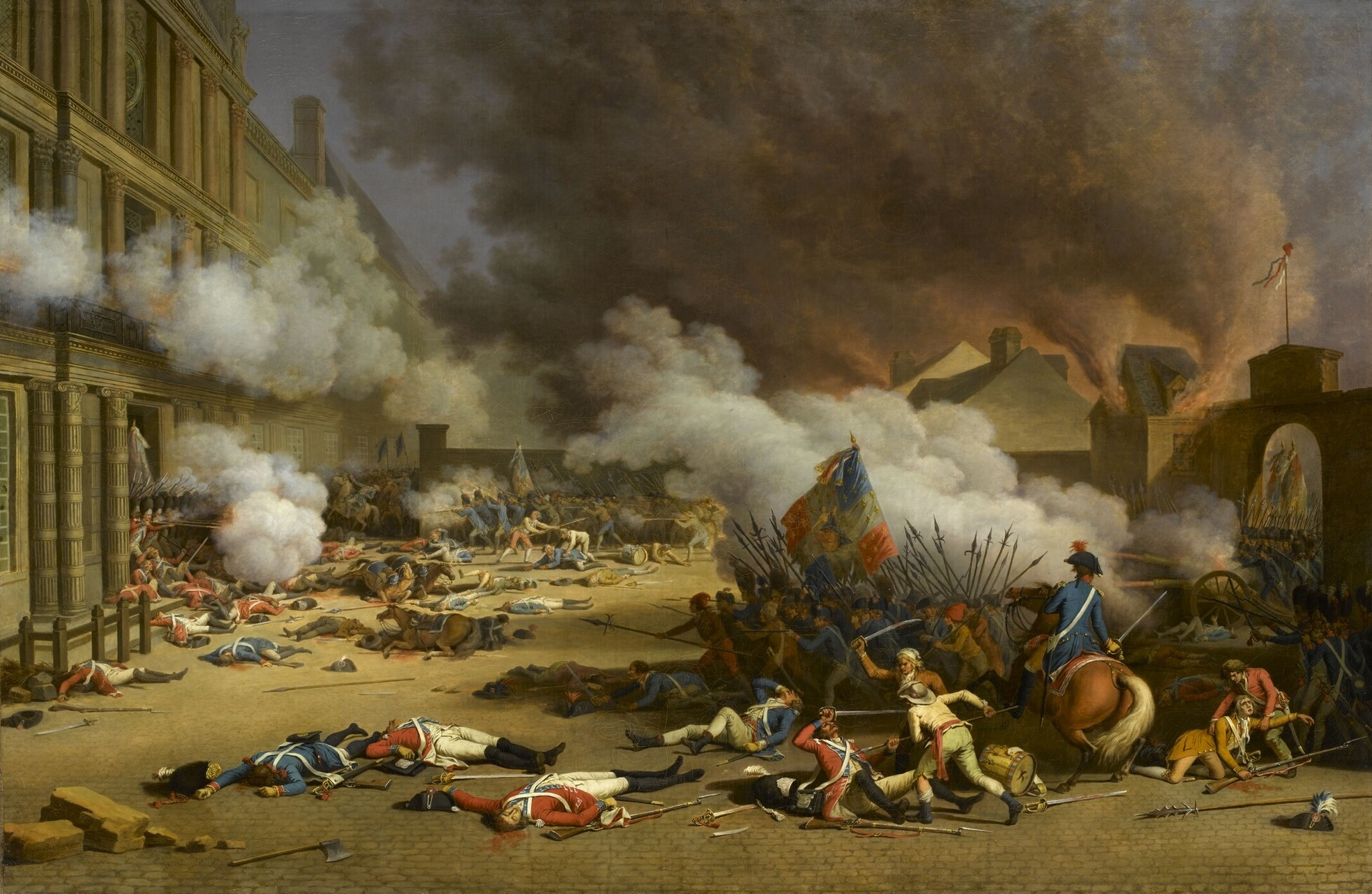
- The insurrection of 10 August 1792 during the French Revolution
- Date: 22 March 1765 – 4 October 1849
- Outcome: Industrial Revolution; Multiple revolutionary waves Atlantic Revolutions; Spanish American wars of independence Brazilian War of Independence; Revolutions of 1820; Revolutions of 1830; Revolutions of 1848; End of feudalism Rise of Republicanism
- Deaths: American Revolution: 37,324+ French Revolution: 150,000+ Napoleonic Wars: 3,500,000–7,000,000 (see Napoleonic Wars casualties) Over 3,687,324–7,187,324 casualties (other wars excluded)

The Age of Revolution is a period from the late-18th to the mid-19th centuries during which a number of significant revolutionary movements occurred in most of Europe and the Americas. The period is noted for the change from absolutist monarchies to representative governments with a written constitution, and the creation of nation states.

Influenced by the new ideas of the Enlightenment, the American Revolution (1765–1783) is usually considered the starting point of the Age of Revolution. Later revolution would be the French Revolution of 1789, the revolution that rapidly spread to the rest of Europe through its wars. In 1799, Napoleon took power in France and continued the French Revolutionary Wars by conquering most of continental Europe. Although Napoleon imposed on his conquests several modern concepts such as equality before the law, or a civil code, his rigorous military occupation triggered national rebellions, notably in Spain and Germany. After Napoleon's defeat, European great powers forged the Holy Alliance at the Congress of Vienna in 1814–15, in an attempt to prevent future revolutions, and also restored the previous monarchies. Nevertheless, Spain was considerably weakened by the Napoleonic Wars and could not control its American colonies, almost all of which proclaimed their independence between 1810 and 1820. Revolution then spread back to southern Europe in 1820, with uprisings in Portugal, Spain, Italy, and Greece. Continental Europe was shaken by two similar revolutionary waves in 1830 and 1848, also called the Spring of Nations. The democratic demands of the revolutionaries often merged with independence or national unification movements, such as in Italy, Germany, Poland, Hungary, etc. The violent repression of the Spring of Nations marked the end of the era.

The expression was popularized by the British historian Eric Hobsbawm in his book The Age of Revolution: Europe 1789–1848, published in 1962.

== History ==
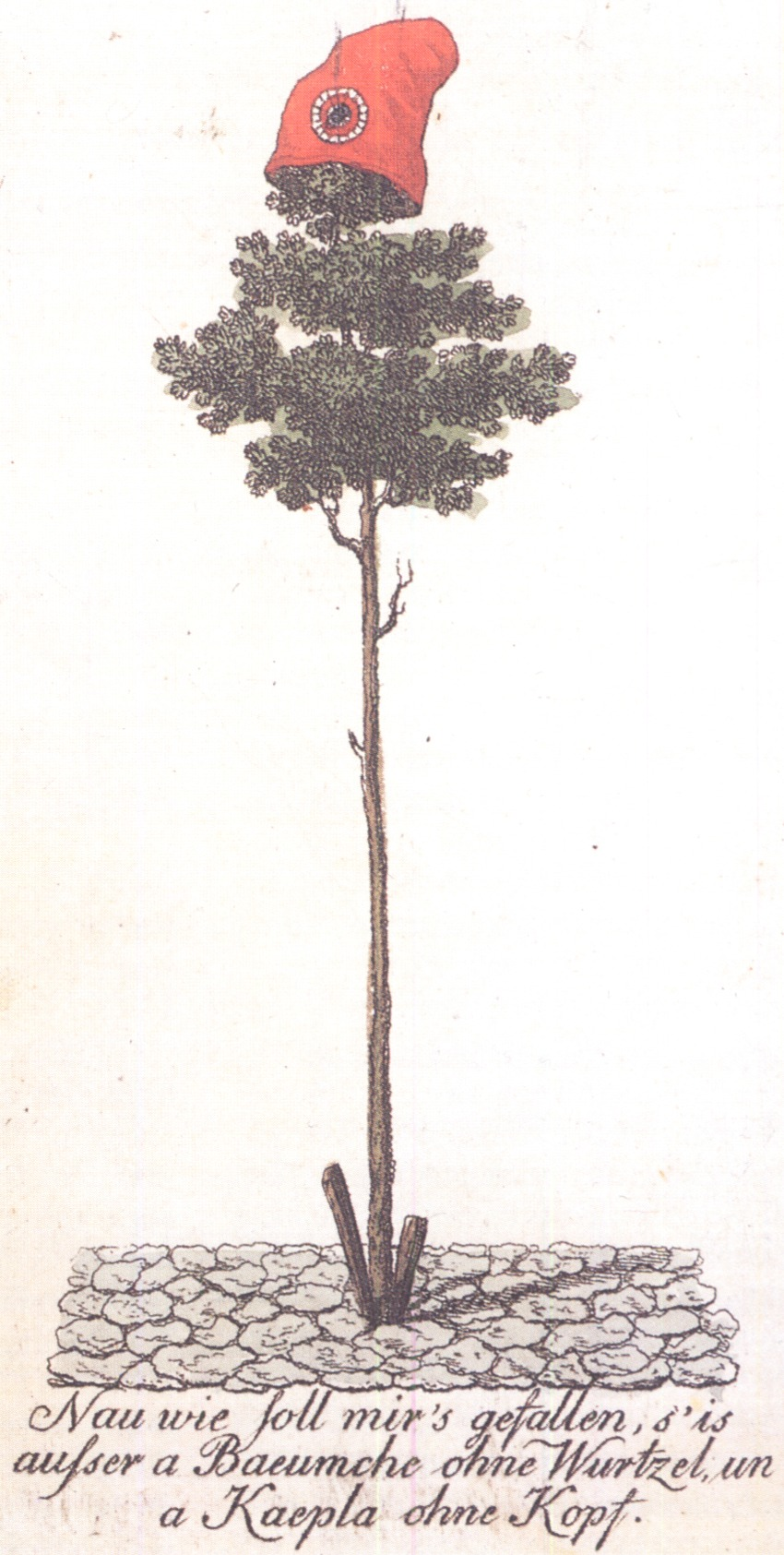
A tree of liberty topped with a Phrygian cap set up in Mainz in 1793. Such symbols were used by several revolutionary movements of the time.

The revolutions took place in both the Americas and Europe, including the United States (1775–1783), Polish–Lithuanian Commonwealth (1788–1792), France and French-controlled Europe (1789–1814), Haiti (1791–1804), Ireland (1798) and Spanish America (1810–1825). There were smaller upheavals in Switzerland, Russia, and Brazil. The revolutionaries in these countries knew of each other, and to some degree were inspired by or emulated each other.

Independence movements in the New World began with the American Revolution, 1775–1783, in which France, the Netherlands and Spain assisted the new United States of America as it secured independence from Britain. In the 1790s, the Haitian Revolution broke out. In the 1810's, Colombia became one of the first South American nations to declare independence from the Spanish Empire, triggering the Colombian War of Independence. With Spain tied down in European conflicts, the mainland Spanish colonies secured independence around 1820.

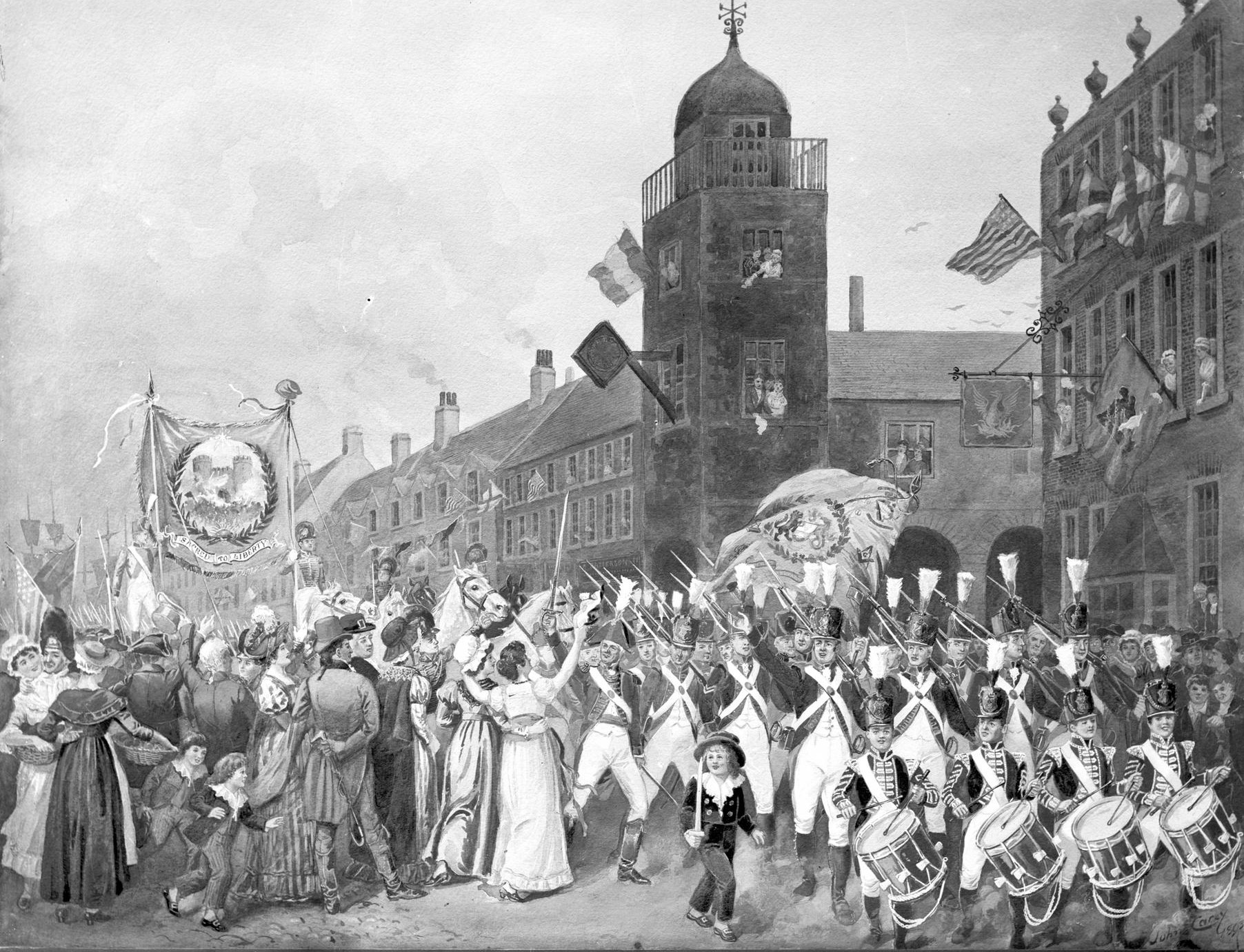
Bastille Day, 1792, Belfast, Ireland. Volunteer companies parade "The Colours of Five Free Nations, viz.: Flag of Ireland – motto, Unite and be free. Flag of America – motto, The Asylum of Liberty. Flag of France – motto, The Nation, the Law, and the King. Flag of Poland – motto, We will support it. Flag of Great Britain – motto, Wisdom, Spirit, and Liberality."

In long-term perspective, the revolutions were mostly successful. They widely spread the ideals of liberalism, republicanism, the overthrow of aristocracies, kings and established churches. For instance, the Genevan revolutionaries in modern-day Switzerland were rebelling against the government of noblemen on the Small Council. The revolutionaries confronted them by spreading the ideals of their republic like liberty to the whole world. They emphasized the universal ideals of the Enlightenment, such as the equality of all men, including equality before the law by unbiased courts. The success of these revolutions demonstrated that the modern notion of revolution, that of establishing a radically new government via popular insurgence, could work in practice. Revolutionary movements and ideas were born and have continued to exist since.

The common Atlantic theme breaks down to some extent from reading the works of Edmund Burke. Burke firstly supported the American colonists in 1774 in "On American Taxation", and took the view that their property and other rights were being infringed by the crown without their consent. In apparent contrast, Burke distinguished and deplored the process of the French revolution in Reflections on the Revolution in France (1790), as in this case property, customary and religious rights were being removed summarily by the revolutionaries and not by the crown. In both cases he was following Montesquieu's theory that the right to own property is an essential element of personal freedom.

The American Revolution, a pivotal event in the broader context of Atlantic revolutions, led to the emergence of the United States as an independent nation. Its ripple effects resonated across the Atlantic, influencing subsequent independence movements and revolutions in Europe and the Americas. For instance, the Haitian Revolution erupted in the 1790s, challenging colonial rule and inspiring aspirations for freedom and equality. Similarly, mainland Spanish colonies secured their independence around the mid-1820s amid the turmoil of the Napoleonic Wars, with precursors such as the Rebellion of Túpac Amaru II leading to South American independence.

In 1781, political tensions arose in the Netherlands when a faction known as the Patriots rose up against the ruling Stadtholder William V, a period today known as the Patriottentijd ("Patriot's Time") in Dutch history. The Patriots had largely been inspired through "Aan het Volk van Nederland" ("To the People of the Netherlands"), a pamphlet published anonymously and written by statesman Joan Derk van der Capellen. In it, van der Capellen not only demanded a change in government, but that the Dutch people should rule themselves. While the Patriot uprising was subdued with foreign aid in 1787, it decidedly paved the way for the formation of the Batavian Republic in 1795, in turn of the French Revolutionary War.

These interconnected revolutions, fueled by ideals of liberalism and republicanism, sought to overthrow entrenched aristocracies and establish governments based on the principles of the Enlightenment. The revolutionary fervor underscored the belief in the possibility of creating radically new governments founded on the principles of justice and equality, a sentiment that continues to resonate in modern times. However, the Atlantic theme of revolution faced complexities and nuances, as highlighted in the contrasting views of figures like Edmund Burke, who supported the American colonists' fight against unjust taxation but criticized the French Revolution for its perceived violation of property and religious rights.

== Atlantic Revolutions ==
The Atlantic Revolutions (22 March 1765 – 4 October 1849) were numerous revolutions in the Atlantic World in the late 18th and early 19th century, which formed a significant portion of the Age of Revolution. Following the Age of Enlightenment, ideas critical of absolutist monarchies spread. A revolutionary wave occurred, with the aim of ending monarchical rule, emphasizing the ideals of the Enlightenment, and spreading liberalism.

In 1755, early signs of governmental changes occurred with the formation of the Corsican Republic and Pontiac's War. The largest of these early revolutions was the American Revolution beginning in 1775, which founded the United States. The American Revolution inspired other movements, including the French Revolution in 1789, the Haitian Revolution in 1791, the Colombian War of Independence in 1810, and the Canadian Rebellions of 1837–1838.

== Industrial Revolution ==
The Industrial Revolution was the transition to new manufacturing processes in the period from about 1760 to sometime between 1820 and 1840. It marked a major turning point in history and almost every aspect of daily life was influenced in some way. In particular, average income and population began to exhibit unprecedented sustained growth. This led to a rapid expansion of cities that resulted in social strains and disturbances. For instance, economic grievances associated with this industrialization fed later revolutions such as those that transpired from 1848. New social classes emerged including those that began to reject orthodox politics. This is demonstrated by the rise of the urban middle class, which became a powerful force so that they had to be integrated into the political system. The upheavals also led to old political ideas that were directed against the social arrangements of the preindustrial regime.

== American Revolution (1765–1783) ==
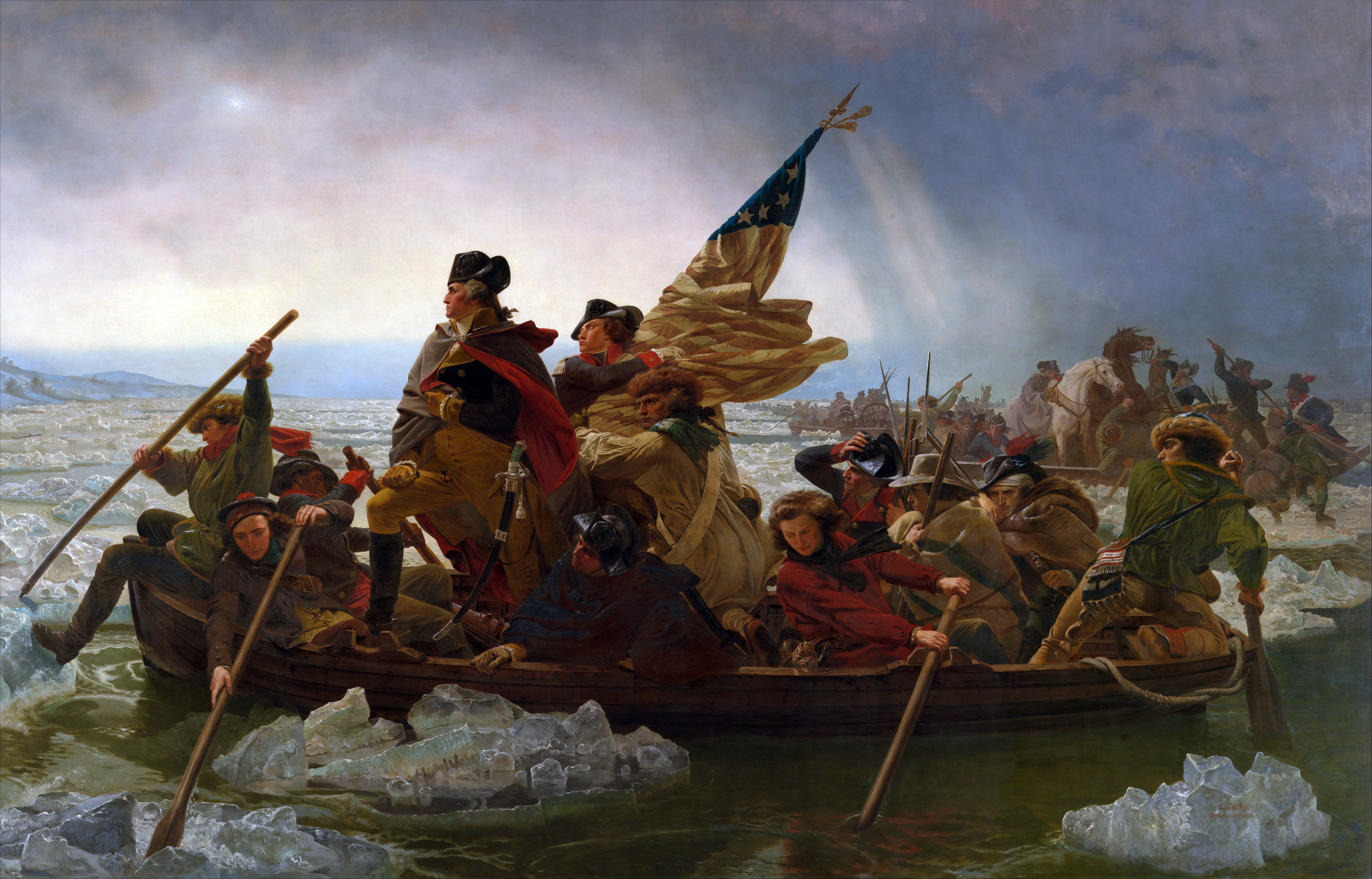
American Revolution

The American Revolution brought about independence for the Thirteen Colonies of British America. This was the first European colony to claim independence. It was the birth of the United States of America, ultimately leading to the drafting and ratification of a U.S. Constitution that included a number of original features within a federated republic and a system of separation of powers and checks and balances. Those include but are not limited to an elected head of state, property rights, due process rights, and the rights of free speech, the press and religious practice.

== French Revolution (1789–1799) ==
The British historian Eric Hobsbawm credits the French Revolution with giving the 19th century its ideology and politics, stating:

France made its revolutions and gave them their ideas, to the point where a tricolour of some kind became the emblem of virtually every emerging nation, and European (or indeed world) politics between 1789 and 1917 were largely the struggle for and against the principles of 1789, or the even more incendiary ones of 1793. France provided the vocabulary and the issues of liberal and radical-democratic politics for most of the world. France provided the first great example, the concept and the vocabulary of nationalism. France provided the codes of law, the model of scientific and technical organization, the metric system of measurement for most countries. The ideology of the modern world first penetrated the ancient civilizations which had hitherto resisted European ideas through French influence. This was the work of the French Revolution.

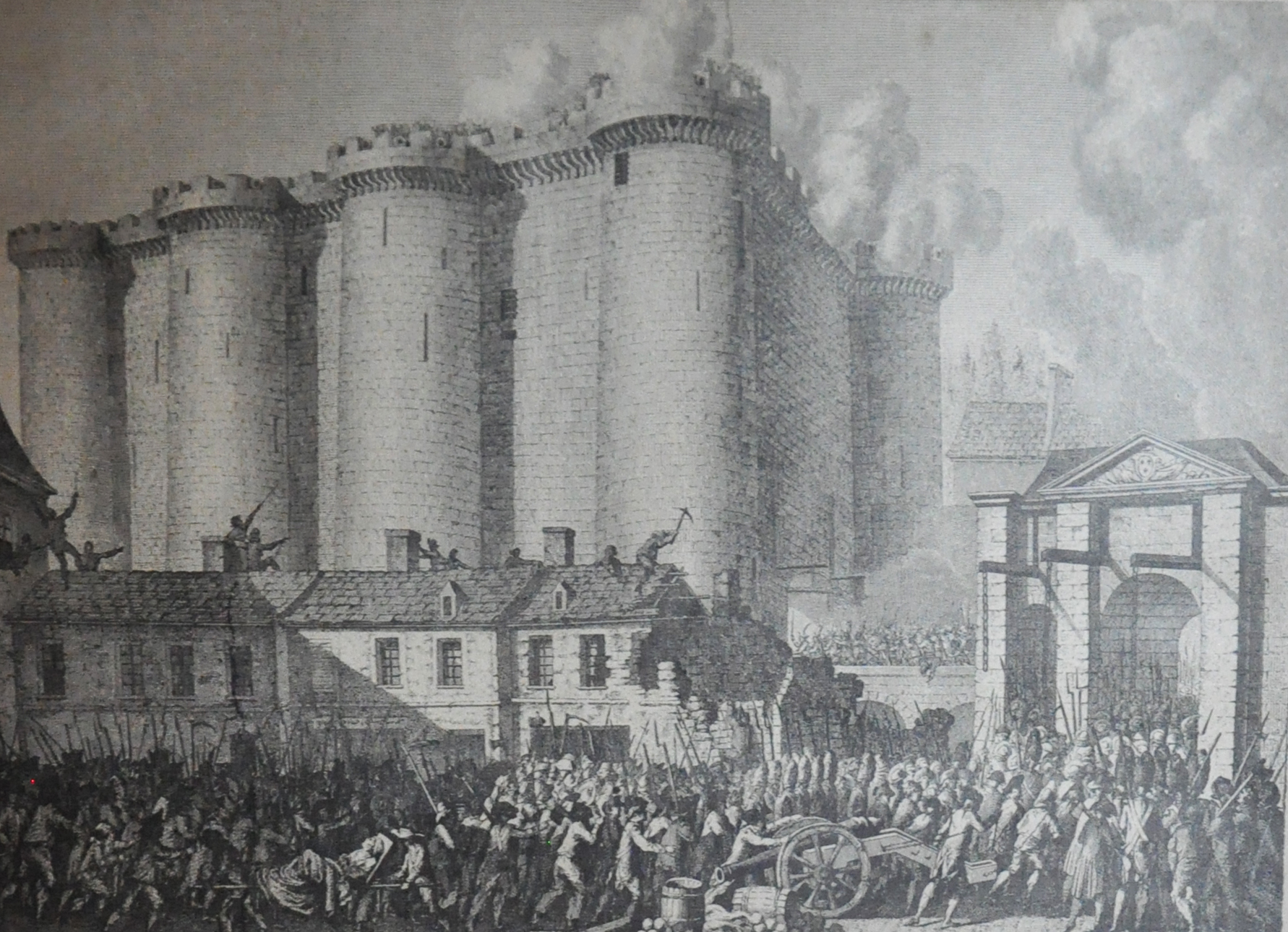
Storming of the Bastille on July 14 (Bastille Day), 1789

The French Revolution was a period of radical social and political upheaval in France from 1789 to 1799 that profoundly affected French and modern history, marking the decline of powerful monarchies and churches and the rise of democracy and nationalism. Popular resentment of the privileges enjoyed by the clergy and aristocracy grew amidst an economic crisis following two expensive wars and years of bad harvests, motivating demands for change. These were couched in terms of Enlightenment ideals and caused the convocation of the Estates-General in May 1789.

The precipitating event was that the King went public that the French state was essentially bankrupt, and because of that he convened the États généraux (Estates general) to replenish state coffers. The Estates-General was made up of 3 estates/orders:

- 1st Estate: Clergy
- 2nd Estate: Nobility
- 3rd Estate: Wealthier, better educated non-nobility (commoners)

=== King's weakened position ===
The French tax regime was regressive, and traditional noble and bourgeois allies felt shut out.

Centralizing monarchical power, i.e. Royal absolutism, onward from Louis XIII in 1614 inward to the royal court in Versailles led to a snowball effect that ended up alienating both nobility and bourgeoisie. There was a tendency to play favorites with the tax regime, especially by exempting nobility from taxation. This led to a feeling of discrimination among the bourgeoisie, which itself was an engine of the Revolution

It was also a question of numbers. The population of nobles versus that of the rest of France wildly disparate: nobles = .4-1.5% out of total population of ca. 28 million. The population of clergy versus the rest of France was even less: about 120,000 clergy total, out of which were 139 powerful and wealthy bishops (.0005% of total pop.); the majority of parish priests were as poor as their parishioners.

=== Bourgeoisie ===
These were young men from commoner families who were not subsistence farmers and whose families could afford to send their sons to either study the law or take over the family business. When talking about these young (mainly) lawyers from this segment of society, one is also talking about products of the Enlightenment. As the former Financial Times chief foreign affairs columnist and author Ian Davidson puts it:

"French society, like others in much of Western Europe, was undergoing a colossal transformation. The ultra-intellectual Enlightenment of Montesquieu and Voltaire, Bach and Mozart, Isaac Newton and Adam Smith was just the tip of a vast change that was happening throughout society and producing an expanding, educated, literate and ambitious bourgeoisie."

Part of this ambition was to enter a political scene that was always locked behind a door to which only the monarchy, clergy, and nobility had the keys. The durable shift here was that, by the time the Estates general convened, their knowledge of law gave them the tools to enter the political scene.

=== Constitutional chronology ===
- Ancien régime (pre 1789)
  - National Constituent Assembly (1789–1791)
- Constitutional Monarchy (1791–1792)
  - National Legislative Assembly (1791–1792)
- First Republic (1792–1804)
  - National Convention (1792–1795)
  - Directory (1795–1799)
  - Consulate (1799–1804)
- First Empire, the reign of Napoleon (1804–1814)

== Haitian Revolution (1791–1804) ==
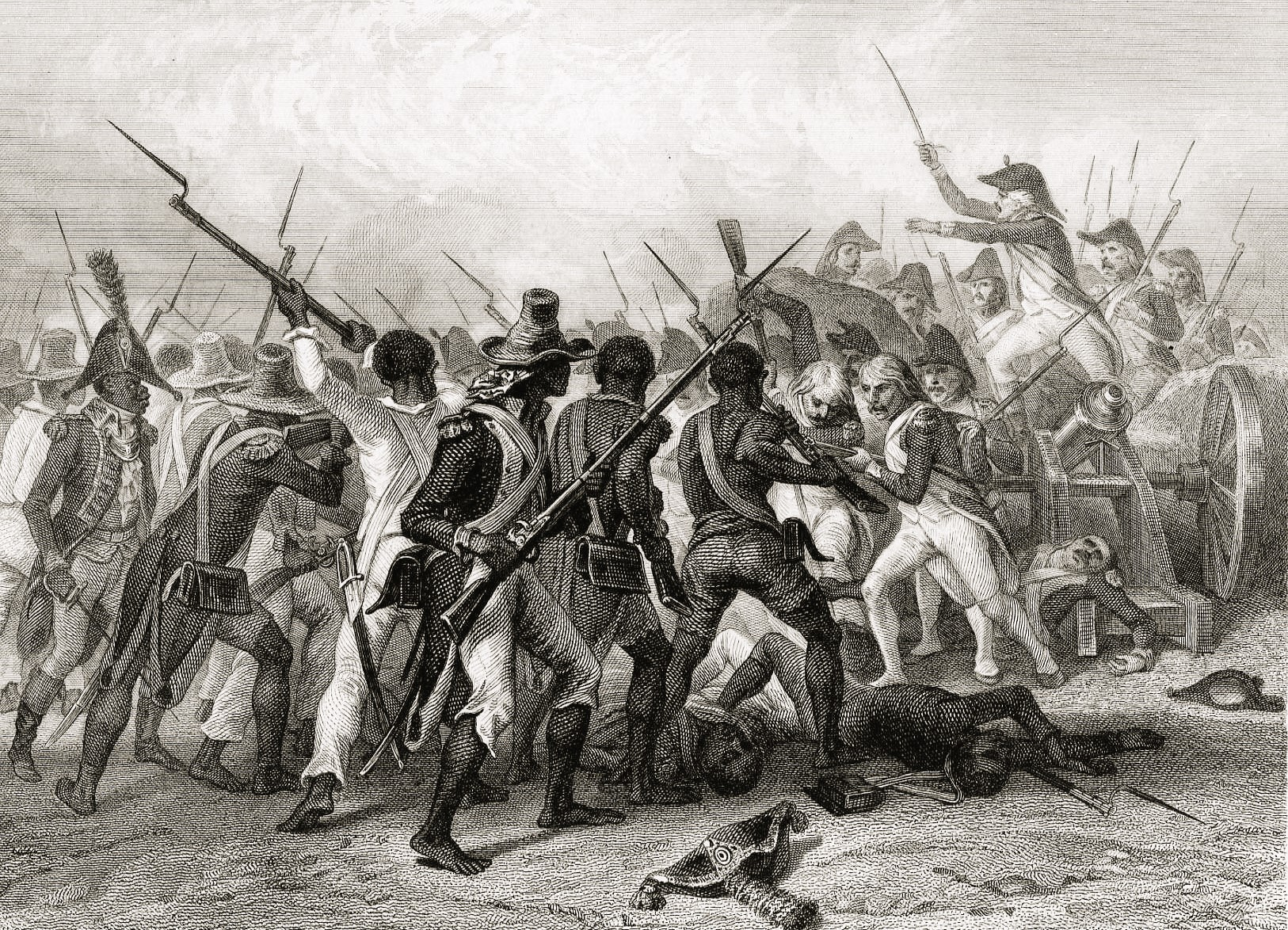
1839 illustration of the 1802 Battle of Crête-à-Pierrot

The Haitian Revolution was a slave rebellion in the French colony of Saint-Domingue, which culminated in the elimination of slavery there and the eventual founding of the Republic of Haiti. The Haitian Revolution was the only slave revolt which led to the founding of a state. Furthermore, it is generally considered the most successful slave rebellion ever to have occurred and as a defining moment in the histories of both Europe and the Americas. The rebellion began with a revolt of black African slaves in August 1791.

One-third of French overseas trade and revenue came from Haitian sugar and coffee plantations. During the French Revolution the colony was brought under the French Republic's control thanks to the Republican abolition of slavery. Toussaint Louverture, a Black general loyal to France, outmanoeuvred successive French officials and became the de facto rule of Saint-Domingue. However, after Napoleon became the first consul of France, he sent troops in 1801 to overthrow Louverture's regime and restore slavery. The war was known for atrocities committed by both sides, and extensive guerrilla warfare. French forces defeated Louverture's army and restored French control by early 1802. However, after Louverture was arrested and deported to France, Blacks in Saint-Domingue rebelled again and gradually drove French forces out of the colony, aided by the British. It ended in November 1803 with the French defeat at the Battle of Vertières. Haiti became an independent country on January 1, 1804.

== United Irishmen's Rebellion (1798) ==
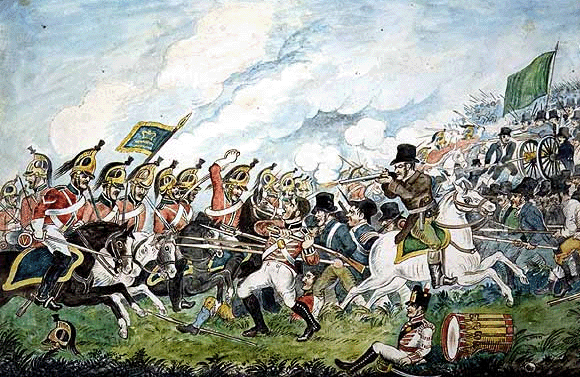
Battle of Vinegar Hill during 1798 Irish rebellion

In 1798, a revolt broke out against British rule in Ireland in the hopes of creating an independent Irish republic. The rebellion was initiated by the Society of United Irishmen and led by Wolfe Tone. The revolt was motivated by a combination of factors, including Irish nationalism, news of the success of the French Revolution, and resentment at the penal laws, which discriminated against Catholics and Presbyterians in Ireland. The rebellion failed and led to the Acts of Union 1800.

== Serbian Revolution (1804–1835) ==
The Serbian Revolution was a national uprising and constitutional change in Serbia that took place between 1804 and 1835, during which the territory evolved from an Ottoman province into a rebel territory, a constitutional monarchy, and finally the modern Serbian state. The first part of the period, from 1804 to 1815, was marked by a violent struggle for independence from the Ottoman Empire with three armed uprisings taking place (The First Serbian Uprising, Hadži-Prodan's rebellion and the Second Serbian Uprising), ending with a ceasefire. During the later period (1815–1835) a peaceful consolidation of political power developed in the increasingly autonomous Serbia, culminating in the recognition of the right to hereditary rule by Serbian princes in 1830 and 1833 and the territorial expansion of the young monarchy. The adoption of the first written Constitution in 1835 abolished feudalism and serfdom, and made the country suzerain. The term "Serbian Revolution" was coined by a German academic historiographer, Leopold von Ranke, in his book Die Serbische Revolution, published in 1829. These events marked the foundation of the modern Principality of Serbia.

Scholars have characterized the Serbian War of Independence and subsequent national liberation as a revolution because the uprisings were started by broad masses of rural Serbian people who were in severe class conflict with the Turkish landowners as a political and economic masters at the same time, similar to Greece in the 1820s.

== Independence Brazil (1807-1822) and Spanish America (1808–1833) ==
In the early 19th century, much of Latin America experienced a series of independence movements that separated the colonies from France, Spain and Portugal, creating new nations, beginning with Haiti in 1804.

Spanish American wars of independence was a complex process with two phases. First, the breakup of the Spanish Monarchy, which began in Spain itself in 1808 with the invasion by the French empire, the Spanish uprising against the Bonapartes, the vacancy of the throne, and the emergence of juntas that were later replicated in America. This necessarily unfolded as it did because the Spanish monarchy's basic cellular structure was the cabildo, or town council (ayuntamiento). Second, the failed attempts at reconstruction, which resulted in a war in itself: Cádiz sought to invent a pan-Hispanic state; Ferdinand VII sought to restore the crown returned to him by Napoleon; and, from America, Bolívar, Iturbide, and others attempted to build large federations or empires. The result was the fragmentation of the Hispanic world into multiple small states of Hispanic America, which managed only to reconstitute the old Spanish administrative boundaries: uti possidetis. Were generally led by the ethnically Spanish but locally born Creole class. The most prominent figures in South America were Simón Bolívar and José de San Martín. In Mexico, they were Hidalgo and Iturbide.

The Independence of Brazil was a unique process that included the Liberal Revolution of 1820 in Portugal and the creation of the Empire of Brazil in 1822.

== Greek War of Independence (1821–1829) ==
Greece in the early 1800s was under the rule of the Ottoman Empire. A series of revolts, starting in 1821, began the conflict. The Ottoman Empire sent in forces to suppress the revolts. By 1827, forces from Russia, Great Britain, and France entered the conflict, helping the Greeks drive the Turkish forces off the Peloponnese Peninsula. The Turks finally recognized Greece as a free nation in May 1832.

== Revolutions of 1820 ==
The Revolutions of 1820 were a series of revolutionary uprisings in Spain, Italy, Portugal, and Greece. Unlike the wars of 1830, these wars tended to be in the outer regions of Europe.

== Revolutions of 1830 ==
A revolutionary wave in Europe which took place in 1830. It included two "romantic nationalist" revolutions, the Belgian Revolution in the United Kingdom of the Netherlands and the July Revolution in France. There also were revolutions in Congress Poland, Italian states, Portugal and Switzerland. It was followed eighteen years later by another and much stronger wave of revolutions known as the Revolutions of 1848.

== Revolutions of 1848 ==
The European Revolutions of 1848, known in some countries as the Spring of Nations, Springtime of the Peoples or the Year of Revolution, were a series of political upheavals throughout Europe in 1848. It remains the most widespread revolutionary wave in European history, but within a year, reactionary forces had regained control, and the revolutions collapsed.

The political impact of the 1848 revolutions was more evident in Austria in comparison to the revolution's effects in countries like Germany. This is attributed to the way the upheavals in Vienna resulted in greater loss of life and gained stronger support from intellectuals, students, and the working class. An account described the German experience as less concerned with national issues, although it succeeded in breaking down class barriers. There was a previously prevalent view that there was only one revolutionary event in Germany but recent scholarship pointed to a fragmented picture of several revolutions happening at the same time.

The 1848 revolutions were also notable because of the increased participation of women. While women rarely participated in revolutionary activities, there were those who performed supportive and auxiliary roles such as the cases of the women's political club in Vienna, which demanded revolutionary measures from the Austrian Constituent Assembly, and the Parisian women who protested and proposed their own solutions to social problems, particularly those involving their rights and crafts.

== See also ==
- Atlantic history
- Circassian Revolution
- List of revolutions and rebellions
- Modern era
- Long nineteenth century
- Pax Britannica
- Political history of the world
- Risorgimento
- Timeline of national independence
- Revolutionary Spring by Christopher Clark
- Spanish American wars of independence
- Influence of the American Revolution on the French Revolution
