= Carole Shammas =

American historian, academic, and author (born 1943)

Carole Shammas (born October 21, 1943) is an American historian, academic, and author. She holds the John R. Hubbard Chair Emeritus in history at the University of Southern California and previously served as the department chair from 2000–03. Her work has explored socioeconomic history of North America, Great Britain and the Atlantic World prior to the mid-nineteenth century. She has written books and articles on the subjects of inheritance, consumption, and household government. Her daughter is the musician Julia Holter.

Shammas got her bachelor's and master's degrees from the University of Southern California and her Ph.D. from Johns Hopkins University.
