= John Wood Sweet =

John Wood Sweet is an American historian, author, and professor at the University of North Carolina at Chapel Hill. Sweet's book, The Sewing Girl's Tale (Holt, 2022), was a New York Times “Editors’ Choice,” the Journal of the American Revolution’s Book of the Year—and won the Bancroft Prize, the Parkman Prize, the James H. Broussard Best Biography Prize, and the Gotham Book Award. “A masterpiece,” wrote Fergus M. Bordewich in the Wall Street Journal. “The Sewing Girl opens a window on the tumultuous world of the early republic. What we see is in some respects lurid and shocking, but it also delivers a vividly intimate portrait of American life as the nation was coming into being.”

Sweet was awarded a Guggenheim Fellowship in 2026 in the field of U.S. History.
