= Philip D. Morgan =

British historian (born 1949)

- Born: 1949 (age 76–77)

Academic background
- Education: University College London; University of Cambridge

Philip D. Morgan (born 1949) is a British historian. He has specialized in Early Modern colonial British America and slavery in the Americas. In 1999, he won both the Bancroft Prize and the Frederick Douglass Prize for his book Slave Counterpoint: Black Culture in the Eighteenth-Century Chesapeake and Lowcountry (1998).

== Life ==
Born in England, Morgan graduated from Cambridge University and received his PhD from University College London.

Morgan taught at the College of William and Mary and was editor of the William and Mary Quarterly from 1997 to 2000. He teaches at Johns Hopkins University, where he is the Harry C. Black Professor of History. During the 2011-12 academic year he was the visiting Harmsworth Professor of American History at Oxford University.

== Awards ==
For Slave Counterpoint (1998)

- 1998 American Historical Association, Albert J. Beveridge Award and Wesley Logan Prize
- 1999:

Bancroft Prize;
The first Frederick Douglass Prize, shared that year with the historian Ira Berlin, awarded by the Gilder Lehrman Center for the Study of Slavery, Yale University;
Organization of American Historians, Elliott Rudwick Prize;
South Carolina Historical Society Prize;
Library of Virginia Literary Nonfiction Award;
Southern Historical Association, Frank L. and Harriet C. Owsley Prize; and
American Philosophical Society, Jacques Barzun Prize (1999).

== Works ==
- Lois Green Carr; Philip D. Morgan; Jean Burrell Russo, eds. (1988). Colonial Chesapeake Society. UNC Press. ISBN 978-0-8078-4343-7. (reprint 1991)
- Bernard Bailyn; Philip D. Morgan, eds. (1991). Strangers within the Realm: Cultural Margins of the First British Empire. Williamsburg, Va.: University of North Carolina Press. ISBN 978-0-8078-4311-6.
- Ira Berlin; Philip D. Morgan (1993). "Introduction". In Ira Berlin (ed.). Cultivation and Culture: Work and the Shaping of Afro-American Culture in the Americas. University of Virginia Press. ISBN 978-0-8139-1421-3.
- Slave Counterpoint: Black Culture in the Eighteenth-Century Chesapeake and Lowcountry. UNC Press. 1998. ISBN 978-0-8078-4717-6.
- Jan Lewis; Peter S. Onuf, eds. (1999). "Interracial Sex In the Chesapeake and the British Atlantic World c.1700-1820". Sally Hemings & Thomas Jefferson: history, memory, and civic culture. University of Virginia Press. ISBN 978-0-8139-1919-5.
- Philip D. Morgan, David Eltis, eds. "New Perspectives on The Transatlantic Slave Trade," William and Mary Quarterly, LVIII (January 2001).
- Philip D. Morgan; Sean Hawkins, eds. (2006). Black Experience and the Empire. Oxford University Press. ISBN 978-0-19-929067-3.
- Christopher Leslie Brown; Philip D. Morgan, eds. (2006). "Arming Slaves in the American Revolution". Arming slaves: from classical times to the modern age. Yale University Press. ISBN 978-0-300-10900-9.
