= Jessica Marie Johnson =

American historian

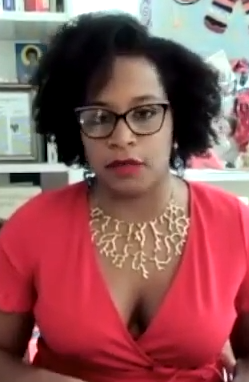
- Johnson in 2021
- Other name: Kismet Nuñez

Academic background
- Education: University of Maryland, College Park
- Doctoral advisor: Ira Berlin

Academic work
- Discipline: History, Black studies
- Sub-discipline: Atlantic slave trade, Black feminism
- Institutions: Johns Hopkins University
- Website: jessicamariejohnson.com

Jessica Marie Johnson is an American historian and Black studies scholar specializing in the history of the Atlantic slave trade. She is an associate professor in the department of history at the Johns Hopkins University Zanvyl Krieger School of Arts and Sciences. In 2020, Johnson published a Black feminist history of the founding of New Orleans titled Wicked Flesh: Black Women, Intimacy, and Freedom in the Atlantic World.

== Life ==
Johnson completed a Ph.D. at the University of Maryland, College Park. Her 2012 dissertation was titled Freedom, kinship, and property: free women of African descent in the French Atlantic, 1685–1810. Her doctoral advisor was Ira Berlin. She is a Black studies scholar and a historian of the Atlantic slave trade.

Johnson began radical black feminist blogging under the pseudonym Kismet Nuñez. In 2020, Johnson authored a Black feminist history of the founding of New Orleans, titled Wicked Flesh: Black Women, Intimacy, and Freedom in the Atlantic World. It received an honorable mention for the Frederick Jackson Turner Award.

Johnson is an associate professor in the department of history at the Johns Hopkins University Zanvyl Krieger School of Arts and Sciences.

== Selected works ==
=== Books ===
- Johnson, Jessica Marie (2020). Wicked Flesh: Black Women, Intimacy, and Freedom in the Atlantic World. University of Pennsylvania Press. ISBN 978-0-8122-5238-5.

=== Journal articles ===
- Lindsey, Treva B.; Johnson, Jessica Marie (September 2014). "Searching for Climax". Meridians: Feminism, Race, Transnationalism. 12 (2): 169–195. doi:10.2979/meridians.12.2.169. ISSN 1536-6936. S2CID 144571028.
- Johnson, Jessica Marie (December 2018). "Markup Bodies". Social Text. 36 (4): 57–79. doi:10.1215/01642472-7145658. ISSN 0164-2472. S2CID 149991494.
