= Berkshire Conference of Women Historians Book Prize =

Berkshire Conference of Women Historians Book Prizes
- Description: Annual book prizes awarded to women residing in North America for their first book in history
- Country: United States / Canada
- Presented by: Berkshire Conference of Women Historians

The Berkshire Conference of Women Historians Book Prizes are awarded each year by the Berkshire Conference of Women Historians. Nominees must be women normally resident in North America who have published a book in the previous year. One prize recognizes an author's first book that "deals substantially with the history of women, gender, and/or sexuality", and the other prize recognizes "a first book in any field of history that does not focus on the history of women, gender, and/or sexuality."

== Winners ==
Year	Winner	Title
1983	Margaret W. Rossiter	Women Scientists in America: Struggles and Strategies to 1940
1990	Jo Burr Margadant	Madame le Professeur: Women Educators in the Third Republic
1990	Laurel Thatcher Ulrich	The Midwife's Tale: The Life of Martha Ballard, Based on her Diary, 1785-1812
1991	Nancy Leys Stepan	"The Hour of Eugenics": Race, Gender and Nation in Latin America
1991	Marilyn B. Young	The Vietnam Wars, 1945-1990
1992	Phyllis Mack	Visionary Women: Ecstatic Prophecy in 17th Century England
1993	Wendy Z. Goldman	Women, the State, and Revolution: Soviet Family Policy and Social Life, 1917-1936
1993	Elisabeth Lasch-Quinn	Black Neighbors: Race and the Limits of Reform in the American Settlement House Movement, 1890-1945
1994	Linda Gordon	Pitied But Not Entitled: Single Mothers and the History of Welfare
1995	Kathryn Kish Sklar	Florence Kelley and the Nation's Work: The Rise of Women's Political Culture, 1830-1900
1996	Isabel V. Hull	Sexuality, State, and Civil Society in Germany, 1700-1815
1996 Honorable Mention	Kathleen M. Brown	Good Wives, Nasty Wenches, and Anxious Patriarchs: Gender, Race and Power in Colonial Virginia
1997	Alice Conklin	A Mission to Civilize: The Republican Idea of Empire in France and West Africa, 1895-1930
1998	Jill Lepore	Name of War: King Philip's War and the Origins of American Identity
1999	Ada Ferrer	Insurgent Cuba: Race, Nation and Revolution 1868-1898
2000	Karin Alejandra Rosemblatt	Gendered Compromises: Political Cultures and the State in Chile, 1920-1950
2000	Elizabeth Thompson	Colonial Citizens: Republican Rights, Paternal Privilege, and Gender in French Syria and Lebanon
2001	Clare Haru Crowston	Fabricating Women: The Seamstresses of Old Regime France, 1675-1791
2002	Patricia M. Pelley	Postcolonial Vietnam: New Histories of the National Past
2002	Samantha Power	"A Problem from Hell": America and the Age of Genocide
2003	Nancy Appelbaum	Muddied Waters: Race, Region, and Local History in Colombia, 1846-1948
2004	Mae M. Ngai	Impossible Subjects: Illegal Aliens and the Making of Modern America
2004	Ruth Rogaski	Hygienic Modernity: Meanings of Health and Disease in Treaty-Port China
2005	Lisa Forman Cody	Birthing the Nation: Sex, Science, and the Conception of the Eighteenth Century Britons
2006	Sandra Bardsley	Venomous Tongues: Speech and Gender in Late Medieval England
2006	Maureen Fitzgerald	Habits of Compassion: Irish Catholic Nuns and the Origins of New York's Welfare System, 1830-1920
2007	Juliana Barr	Peace Came in the Form of a Woman: Indians and Spaniards in the Texas Borderlands
2008	Weijing Lu	True to Her Word: The Faithful Maiden Cult in Late Imperial China
2009	Hannah Rosen	Terror in the Heart of Freedom: Citizenship, Sexual Violence, and the Meaning of Race in the Postemancipation South
2010	Christina Snyder	Slavery in Indian Country: The Changing Face of Captivity in Early America
2010 Honorable Mention	Jennifer Guglielmo	Living the Revolution: Italian Women's Resistance and Radicalism in New York City, 1880-1945
2011	Kate Haulman	The Politics of Fashion in Eighteenth-Century America
2011	Kate Ramsey	The Spirits and the Law: Vodou and Power in Haiti
2012	Adria L. Imada	Aloha America: Hula Circuits through the U.S. Empire
2012	Françoise Hamlin	Crossroads at Clarksdale: The Black Freedom Struggle in the Mississippi Delta after WW II
2013	Camille Robcis	The Law of Kinship: Anthropology, Psychoanalysis, and the Family in Twentieth-Century France
2013	Teresa Barnett	Sacred Relics: Pieces of the Past in Nineteenth-Century America
2014	Susanah Shaw Romney	New Netherland Connections: Intimate Networks and Atlantic Ties in Seventeenth-Century America
2014	Tatiana Seijas	Asian Slaves in Colonial Mexico: from Chinos to Indians
2015	Talitha L. LeFlouria	Chained in Silence: Black Women and Convict Labor in the New South
2015	Vanessa Ogle	The Global Transformation of Time, 1870-1950
2016	Marisa J. Fuentes	Dispossessed Lives: Enslaved Women, Violence, and the Archive
2016	Anya Zilberstein	A Temperate Empire: Making Climate Change in Early America
2017	Sasha Turner	Contested Bodies: Pregnancy, Childrearing, and Slavery in Jamaica
2017	S. Debora Kang	The INS on the Line: Making Immigration Law on the US-Mexico Border, 1917-1954
2018	Keisha N. Blain	Set the World on Fire: Black Nationalist Women and the Global Struggle for Freedom
2018	Christine M. DeLucia	Memory Lands: King Philip's War and the Place of Violence in the Northeast
2019	Lauren Jae Gutterman	Her Neighbor's Wife: A History of Lesbian Desire Within Marriage
2019	Sarah A. Seo	Policing the Open Road: How Cars Transformed American Freedom
2020	Gina A. Tam	Dialect and Nationalism in China, 1860-1960
2020	Alice L. Baumgartner	South to Freedom: Runaway Slaves to Mexico and the Road to the Civil War
2020	Jessica Marie Johnson	Wicked Flesh: Black Women, Intimacy, and Freedom in the Atlantic World
2021	Sara T. Damiano	To Her Credit: Women, Finance, and the Law in Eighteenth-Century New England Cities
2021	Shahla Hussain	Kashmir in the Aftermath of Partition
2022	Christina Ramos	Bedlam in the New World: A Mexican Madhouse in the Age of Enlightenment
2022	Brooke M. Bauer	Becoming Catawba: Catawba Indian Women and Nation-Building, 1540-1840
2023	Lucia Carminati	Seeking Bread and Fortune in Port Said: Labor Migration and the Making of the Suez Canal, 1850-1906
2023	Elizabeth O'Brien	Surgery and Salvation: The Roots of Reproductive Injustice in Mexico, 1770-1940
2024	Michelle Lynn Kahn	Foreign in Two Homelands: Racism, Return Migration, and Turkish-German History
2024	Eva Payne	Empire of Purity: The History of Americans' Global War on Prostitution

== See also ==
- List of history awards
