= Christopher Clark (disambiguation) =

Christopher Clark (born 1960) is an Australian historian.

Christopher Clark may also refer to:

- Christopher H. Clark (1767–1828), Virginia congressman and lawyer
- Christopher F. Clark (born 1953), British-born American historian
- Donald Christopher Clark (born 1975), American musician

== See also ==
- Christopher Clarke (judge) (born 1947), English judge
- Chris Clark (disambiguation)
- Chris Clarke (disambiguation)
