= Steven Hahn =

American historian (born 1951)

- Born: Steven Howard Hahn; July 18, 1951 (age 75); New York City, US
- Awards: Bancroft Prize (2004); Pulitzer Prize (2004)

Academic background
- Education: University of Rochester; Yale University
- Thesis: The Roots of Southern Populism (1979)
- Doctoral advisor: Howard R. Lamar; C. Vann Woodward

Academic work
- Discipline: History
- Institutions: University of Delaware; University of California, San Diego; Northwestern University; University of Pennsylvania; New York University
- Doctoral students: Greg Downs, Justin Behrend
- Notable works: A Nation Under Our Feet (2003)

Steven Howard Hahn (born 1951) is professor of history at New York University.

== Life ==
Hahn was born on July 18, 1951, in New York City. Educated at the University of Rochester, where he worked with Eugene Genovese and Herbert Gutman, Hahn received his PhD degree from Yale University. His dissertation was overseen by C. Vann Woodward, and later Howard R. Lamar.

He has written on the South, slavery and emancipation, the Populist Era, rural cultures, and social migration. His first book was The Roots of Southern Populism: Yeoman Farmers and the Transformation of the Georgia Upcountry, 1850–1890 (Oxford University Press, 1983). This study was important because it provided a detailed and original account of the political ideology of white southern small farmers. At the time this group, the majority of the American South, had received relatively little scholarly attention. Hahn presented the southern yeomen as non-capitalist in crucial respects, and describes how they were undermined by the increasing commercialization of Southern agriculture after the Civil War. Populists were presented as having had almost no interest in a genuinely biracial polity.

In 2003 Hahn published his second book A Nation Under Our Feet: Black Political Struggles in the Rural South from Slavery to the Great Migration, which won the 2004 Pulitzer Prize for History. Several historians have noted that in this book a union of black and white workers is presented as a much more likely possibility. In 2009 he published The Political Worlds of Slavery and Freedom, a version of the Nathan I. Huggins Lecture he delivered at Harvard University two years earlier. A Nation Without Borders: The United States and Its World in an Age of Civil Wars was published in 2016 by Penguin Press. His latest book is Illiberal America - A History, published by W. W. Norton & Company in May 2025.

Hahn has won a number of teaching awards and has been supported in his research by the Guggenheim Foundation, the American Council of Learned Societies, the Center for Advanced Study in the Behavioral Sciences at Stanford, and the Huntington Library in San Marino, California.

Hahn has taught at the University of Delaware, the University of California, San Diego, Northwestern University, the University of Pennsylvania, and New York University. He has two children, Declan Hahn and Saoirse, and lives in New York City.

== Awards ==
- 1980 Allan Nevins Prize of the Society of American Historians, for his doctoral dissertation, The Roots of Southern Populism
- 1984 Frederick Jackson Turner Award of the Organization of American Historians, for The Roots of Southern Populism: Yeoman Farmers and the Transformation of the Georgia Upcountry, 1850–1890
- 2004 Pulitzer Prize for History, for A Nation Under Our Feet
- 2004 Bancroft Prize, for A Nation Under Our Feet
- Merle Curti Award in Social History from the Organization of American Historians

== Bibliography ==
- Steven Hahn; Jonathan Prude, eds. (1985). The Countryside in the Age of Capitalist Transformation: Essays in the Social History of Rural America. University of North Carolina Press. ISBN 978-0-8078-4139-6. "Steven Hahn."
- Freedom: A Documentary History of Emancipation, 1861-1867. Series III: Land and Labor in 1865. Cambridge University Press. 2004.
- A Nation Under our Feet. Harvard University Press. 2003. ISBN 978-0-674-01169-4. "Steven Hahn."
- Steven Hahn (2006). The roots of southern populism: yeoman farmers and the transformation of the Georgia upcountry, 1850-1890. Oxford University Press. ISBN 978-0-19-530670-5.
- Steven Hahn (2009). The Political Worlds of Slavery and Freedom. Harvard University Press. ISBN 978-0-674-03296-5. "Steven Hahn."
- Steven Hahn (2017). A Nation Without Borders: The United States and Its World in an Age of Civil Wars. Penguin Books. ISBN 978-0-143-12178-7.
- Steven Hahn (2024). Illiberal America: a History. W. W. Norton & Company. ISBN 978-0-393-63592-8.

Awards
Preceded by Rosalind Rosenberg	Frederick Jackson Turner Award; 1984	Succeeded by Barton C. Shaw
Preceded by James F. Brooks	Bancroft Prize; 2004; With: Edward L. Ayers and George Marsden	Succeeded by Melvin Patrick Ely
Preceded by Alan Gallay	Bancroft Prize; 2004; With: Edward L. Ayers and George Marsden	Succeeded by Michael Klarman
Preceded by Alan Gallay	Bancroft Prize; 2004; With: Edward L. Ayers and George Marsden	Succeeded by Michael O'Brien
Preceded by Helen Lefkowitz Horowitz	Merle Curti Award; 2004; With: Colin G. Calloway and George Marsden	Succeeded by Steven Mintz
Preceded by Helen Lefkowitz Horowitz	Merle Curti Award; 2004; With: Colin G. Calloway and George Marsden	Succeeded by Michael O'Brien
Preceded by Rick Atkinson	Pulitzer Prize for History; 2004	Succeeded by David Hackett Fischer
