= Sehat =

Sehat or SEHAT could refer to:

- Sehat Sutardja (1961–2024), Indonesian-American businessman
- Social Endeavor for Health and Telemedicine, a telemedicine health initiative in India
- David Sehat, American historian
