= Chester Morgan =

Chester Morgan may refer to:

- Chester M. Morgan, American historian
- Chet Morgan (1910–1991), American baseball player for the Detroit Tigers
- Chet Morgan (politician) (1937–2018), American politician, member of the Connecticut House of Representatives
