= Chris Clark =

Chris Clark may refer to:

== Music ==
- Chris Clark (singer) (born 1946), American soul singer
- Clark (musician) (Chris Clark, born 1979), British electronic musician and composer

== Sports ==
- Christine Clark (born 1962), American long-distance runner
- Chris Clark (ice hockey) (born 1976), American ice hockey player
- Chris Clark (footballer, born 1980), Scottish footballer
- Chris Clark (footballer, born 1984), English footballer
- Chris Clark (American football) (born 1985), American football player

== Others ==
- Chris Clark (reporter) (born 1938), American reporter, former lead news anchor for WTVF-TV Nashville, Tennessee
- Chris Clark (writer) (born 1945/6), British author who writes about unsolved crimes
- Chris Clark (historian) (born 1960), Australian historian
- Chris Clark (deminer) (born 1964), British mine action expert
- Chris Clark (politician) (born 1983), mayor of Mountain View, California

== See also ==
- Chris Clarke (disambiguation)
- Christopher Clark (disambiguation)
- Christy Clark (born 1965), Canadian politician
