= Krochmal =

Krochmal is a Polish surname meaning "starch". Notable people with the surname include:

- Max Krochmal, American historian
- Menachem Mendel Krochmal (c. 1600–1661), Polish-Moravian rabbi
- Nachman Krochmal (1785–1840), Galician philosopher, theologian and historian
