= Michael Dann =

American television executive

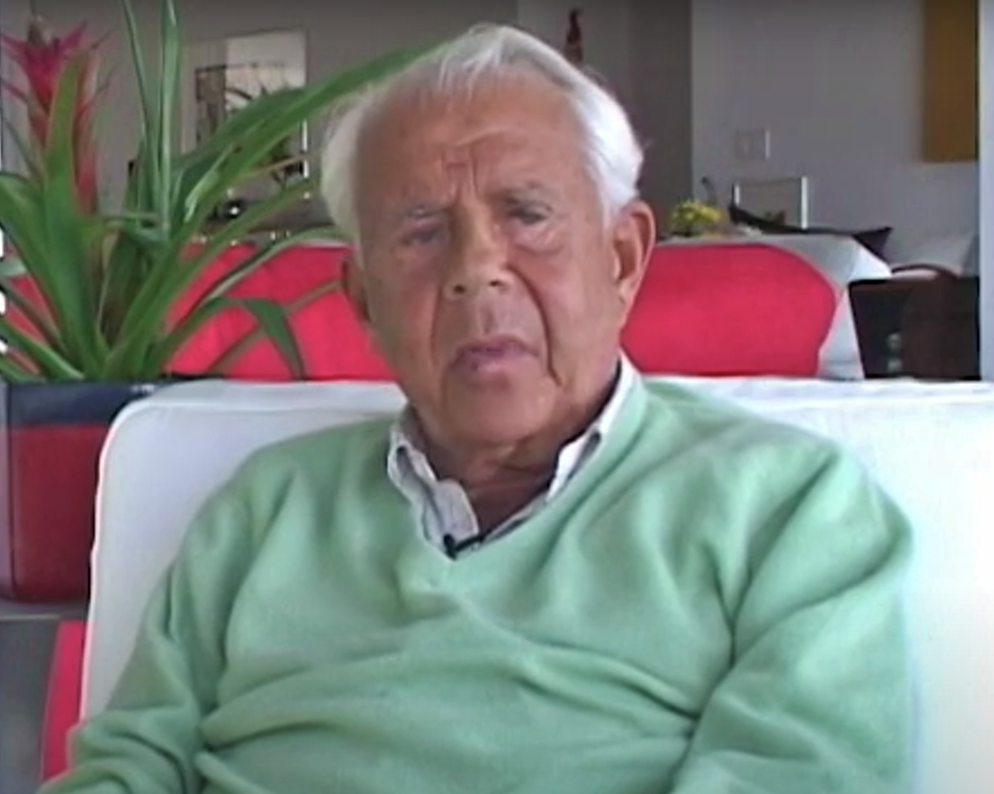
Michael Dann

Michael Harold Dann (September 11, 1921 – May 27, 2016) was an American television executive.

Dann was vice president of programming at CBS from 1963 to 1970, having worked there since leaving NBC in the late 1950s. He took a pragmatic approach to programming, opting not to enforce a personal vision for the network other than to try to get more viewers without regard to key demographics. To this effect, he commissioned a number of rural sitcoms for the network (a format he personally hated) and, in 1967, canceled all of the network's profitable, but low-rated, prime time game shows. He believed in the notions of hammocking and tent-pole programming, in which a new or struggling sitcom could be made more successful by putting more successful shows before and after it. Many of Dann's approaches to programming would be reversed when Fred Silverman replaced Dann in 1970; Silverman orchestrated the "rural purge" and took the network into a more urban-oriented direction.

After leaving CBS, Dann joined the upstart Children's Television Workshop, where he spearheaded the Sesame Street international co-productions. In 1977, Dann was recruited to program the experimental interactive television system, QUBE

Dann's career with CBS is chronicled in Les Brown's book, Televi$ion: The Business Behind The Box.

He was born in Detroit, Michigan in September 1921. Dann died in May 2016 at the age of 94.

Business positions
Preceded by Hubbell Robinson	Vice President, Programs CBS; 1963-1970	Succeeded by Fred Silverman
