= Clarke LJ =

Lord Justice Clarke or Clarke LJ may refer to:

- Anthony Clarke, Baron Clarke of Stone-cum-Ebony (who served in the Court of Appeal from 1998 to 2009)
- Christopher Clarke (judge) (who has served in the Court of Appeal since 2013)
