= Les Brown =

Les Brown may refer to:

- Les Brown (bandleader) (1912–2001), American big band leader
- Les Brown (politician) (born 1945), American author, motivational speaker, and former Ohio politician
- Les Brown (American football) (born 1987), NFL tight end
- Les Brown (journalist) (1928–2013), American journalist

== See also ==
- The Les Brown Show, a 1993 talk show hosted by the politician
- Leslie Brown (disambiguation)
- Leslie Browne (born 1957), American ballet dancer and actress
- Les Battersby-Brown, fictional character in British soap-opera Coronation Street
