= Gideon L. Ammons =

Narragansett chief (1811–1899)

Chairman of the Narragansett Indian Council (Note: Both terms were in the same council. After 1880 the state no longer recognized it, and the Bureau of Indian Affairs calls its head in this period the "chairman" (Bureau of Indian Affairs 1982, p. 12); newspapers of the time called him the tribe's "chief" (Fall River Herald 1899).)
- In office by 1892 – 1896

President of the Narragansett Indian Council
- In office Several terms, to 1880

Personal details
- Born: February 23, 1811 (Note: His obituary gives his birth date as February 23, 1811, which the 1885 state census supports (The Evening Bulletin 1899, p. 5; Rhode Island State Census 1885). Other records, including the Charlestown death register, imply a birth in 1812 (Rhode Island Vital Records 1899; Murphree 2012, "Ammons, Gideon").) Charlestown, Rhode Island, U.S.
- Died: November 1899 (aged 88) (Note: Some later works give his death year as 1898 (Mandell 2008, p. 220; Murphree 2012, "Ammons, Gideon").) Charlestown, Rhode Island, U.S.
- Cause of death: Drowning
- Spouse(s): Caroline Rodman; Sarah Eleazer
- Parent(s): George Ammons; Jerusha (Noka) Ammons
- Occupation: Whaler, stonemason, farmer

Gideon L. Ammons (February 23, 1811 – November 1899) was a Narragansett leader from Charlestown, Rhode Island. He was a member of the tribe's Indian Council from 1847 to 1884 and its president several times. In his youth he was a whaling officer, and he later worked as a stonemason and farmer.

Ammons helped build the Narragansett Indian Church in 1859, and that year joined a criminal complaint against men who had robbed a tribal grave. He challenged the exclusion of Narragansett children from the local public school, a case he lost in the Rhode Island Supreme Court in 1864. In 1879, as council president, he petitioned the Rhode Island General Assembly to investigate encroachment on tribal lands and to decide whether tribal members should be enfranchised as citizens of Rhode Island. The resulting inquiry led to the state's 1880 act ending its recognition of the tribe, and Ammons signed the deed conveying the tribe's common lands to the state. He remained the tribe's principal leader afterward, in a role the press called chief, and led its claim to a strip of shoreland that the council said had never been sold. At his death newspapers described him as the last of the Narragansett chiefs.

== Early life and family ==
Ammons was born in Charlestown, the son of George Ammons and Jerusha (Noka) Ammons, both members of the tribe. His maternal grandfather, Gideon Nocake, was a Revolutionary War veteran who had served for many years as a leading member of the tribal council. His maternal uncle, Gideon Noka, was the father of Ammons's cousin and fellow councilman Joshua H. Noka. His siblings included a brother, Joseph, and two sisters, Sarah (Ammons) Watson and Harriet (Ammons) Jackson.

== Career ==
=== Whaling ===
The whaleship Emma C. Jones

Ammons registered as a seaman at Newport in December 1832, at about twenty, and sailed on whaling voyages out of Newport, Westport, New Bedford and Sag Harbor, among them voyages in the Constitution of Westport and the Roman of New Bedford. He rose from boatsteerer, the harpooner of a whaleboat, to third mate, serving in that rank on the New Bedford ship Emma C. Jones from 1849 to 1852. The historian Nancy Shoemaker counts him and his brother Joseph among the Native whalemen who became officers in the 1840s and 1850s.

=== Stonemason and farmer ===
When whaling no longer paid well, Ammons became a stonemason, a trade followed by many Narragansett men; in 1858 the state's commissioner reported that "quite a number" of them were "masons, stone cutters, and wallers". In the mid-1870s he worked in Westerly and at Watch Hill. In later life he farmed a five-acre allotment near Shannock.

=== Church (1859) ===
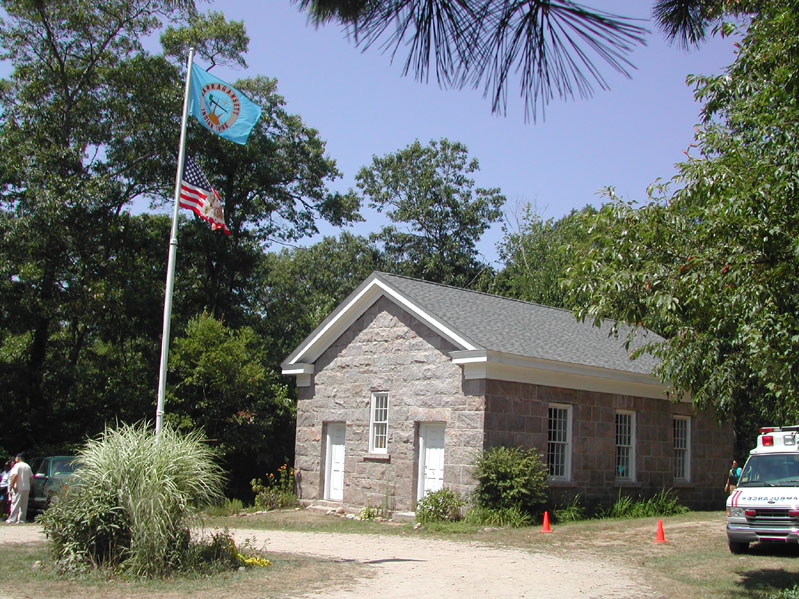
Narragansett Indian Church

In 1859 Ammons was one of four masons, with Joseph Stanton, Joshua Noka and Brister Michael, who built the stone meeting house of the Narragansett Indian Church in Charlestown; he had signed the church's covenant in 1856. The church lot is the only part of the tribe's original land that never left its possession.

== Indian Council (1847–1884) ==
Ammons was elected in 1847 to the Indian Council, the five-member body that governed the tribe's affairs, elected each year under an act of the General Assembly passed on February 7, 1792, which abolished the position of sachem. (Note: The tribe re-established the office of chief sachem when it reorganized as the Narragansett Tribe of Indians in 1934 (Narragansett Indian Tribe n.d.; Robinson 2014, p. 370).) He stayed on the council after 1850, when the tribe adopted a written constitution that placed a president at the council's head. Ammons served for many years with Samuel Noka, signing tribal certificates as vice-president under Noka as president, and was himself president "many times". (Note: His obituaries state that he served on the council only until 1878 (The Evening Bulletin 1899, p. 5); the commission's records show him serving until 1884 (Commission on the Affairs of the Narragansett Indians 1881, pp. 22, 26).) He was president when the state moved to end the tribe's status in 1879, and in March 1880 he was re-elected to the council under Benjamin Thomas as president, serving until the council's work with the state ended in 1884.

=== Grave robbing case (1859) ===
In May 1859 nine Charlestown men dug up a grave on Indian Burial Hill believed to be that of a daughter of the sachem Ninigret, removing the coffin and its contents, which were later dispersed to the Rhode Island Historical Society, Harvard's Peabody Museum and private collectors. Ammons, Henry Hazard and Joshua Noka brought a criminal complaint against them. The accused were bound over to the Supreme Court, but the case was not subsequently prosecuted. (Note: Rubertone, citing court records, names the third complainant as John Noka (Rubertone 2001, pp. 176–177). Clauson and Dumpson state that the defendants were acquitted (Clauson 1934, p. 21; Dumpson 2022, p. 113).)

=== School case (1864) ===
Ammons and Joshua Noka sent their children to Charlestown's district public school instead of the separate state-funded Indian school, and the district expelled the children in 1859 and again around 1861. The state Commissioner of Public Schools ruled in the fathers' favor, but on January 15, 1864, the Rhode Island Supreme Court reversed him in Ammons v. School District No. 5. Chief Justice Samuel Ames held that although no law excluded the children "by express words", state law did so "by plain, if not by necessary implication", because it funded a school "for the exclusive use of their tribe" and left the tribe out of the district's school money. Ammons and Noka then petitioned the General Assembly over the school taxes the district had assessed on their land.

=== Detribalization (1879–1880) ===
State officials had urged an end to the tribe's status since at least 1858, when its commissioner advised that the tribe should be "placed on an equal footing with other citizens of the State". Members living on the reservation were wards of the state, and a clause in the state constitution barred tribe members from voting until 1950. In January 1879, as president of the Indian Council, Ammons and "other men and women" petitioned the General Assembly to investigate encroachments on the tribe's lands "and whether it was better to continue the tribe as a tribe or enfranchise them". The historian Daniel Mandell suggests the petition responded to a bill introduced that month to sell the tribe's lands. The House appointed a committee to consider "the justice, expediency, and practicability of abolishing the tribal relations of the Narragansett Indians".

Ammons was the first witness at the committee's opening hearing at the Indian meeting house on July 30, 1879. He read the 1709 deed by which Ninigret had reserved the tribe's lands, asserted the tribe's claim to a strip along the shore reserved for "the privilege of pitching our tents, and fishing, to procure a living", and declined citizenship until the tribe's land claims were settled. At the second hearing he pointed out that the state's law did not "allow a negro, or a mulatto, or an Indian, to intermarry" with its white citizens, and warned that citizenship on those terms "would be a name without any gain to it"; he wanted instead "to come out right on the ground with other citizens, as long as I behaved myself, and was honest and decent". At the third, in October, he said the tribe's old members "looked at the ponds with a greater magnitude than they did at the lands", but that if the state wanted the land he stood "ready to sign the deed any time" for a fair price.

Although all five council members had opposed termination at the hearings, the council agreed on December 26, 1879, to convey the tribe's common lands to the state for $5,000 (equivalent to $166,810 in 2025); the Bureau of Indian Affairs describes it as having "reluctantly agreed". The committee justified ending the tribe's status by its members' mixed ancestry, reporting that "there is not a person of pure Indian blood in the tribe" and that "their extinction as a tribe has been accomplished as effectually by nature as an Act of the General Assembly will put an end to the name". The legal scholar Taylor A. Dumpson describes this reasoning as part of a "paper genocide" that classified Narragansett people by skin color rather than tribal identity. The General Assembly passed "An Act to Abolish the Tribal Authority and Tribal Relations of the Narragansett Tribe of Indians" on March 31, 1880, and on May 15 Ammons and the other council members signed the quitclaim deed to the state. The Narragansett Indian Tribe regards the detribalization as illegal because it was carried out without federal approval. Council members later said the deed "covered more territory than they really meant to sell": they had meant to sell only the reservation, about 1,000 acres (400 ha), and to keep the shore claim, which the deed's general wording also conveyed. (Note: In 1931 Daniel Sekater, another signer, alleged that the deed's clause conveying "all their other tribal rights and claims" had been interlined (The Providence Sunday Journal 1931, p. 2).)

=== Membership hearings (1880–1881) ===
Thomas and Ammons prepared the first list of claimants to share in the purchase money, 99 names, and Ammons explained the council's membership rules at the commission's hearings. Claimants had to establish their descent through living witnesses who could "trace their pedigree from the stump", that is, back to the tribe's recognized founding families. When a claimant's parents had not been married, the council traced descent through the mother: "the child follows the mother". Disputes among the tribe's own members over who belonged at times turned on race: when Edward Cone, a Narragansett whom the council had left off its list, pressed his claim, Ammons told him that "if we can judge anything from color, we should judge that you was an African", and Cone replied, "Then I should judge that you were." Mandell sees such rhetoric as part of a struggle over the tribe's boundaries and family rivalries. Ammons opposed placing the purchase money in a state-managed fund: "give us the money, and let us come out square-footed as citizens, and I am ready to go." In 1881 the court decreed a final roll of 324 members, each entitled to $15.43 of the $5,000 purchase price.

=== Fort Ninigret dedication (1883) ===
1883 Fort Ninigret marker

On August 30, 1883, the state dedicated a memorial at Fort Ninigret to close its dealings with the tribe; Commissioner George Carmichael Jr. told the gathering that Rhode Island was "the first State to absolutely abolish" tribal government. Speaking for the former council, Ammons said that the fort "was held by my ancestors", who had later buried their weapons at Bonnet Point and "stopped teaching their children the Indian tongue". He thanked the governors, legislatures and commissioners who had dealt with the tribe since 1847, saying that its people were now "set upon equal footing in the eyes of the law", and ended:

Sixty-five years ago, there were but a few of the Niantics left in the Narragansett country. Our tribe now has no legal existence, and no person can be found to represent the Indian race. The change is so great, I feel sorry to think of it. I am done.

The historian Christine DeLucia argues that his speech and that of Joshua Noka did not fully accept the ceremony's account of the tribe's end as willing and painless.

== Leadership after detribalization (1880s–1899) ==
Although the state no longer recognized a tribal government, the tribe continued to elect a council, which met from 1892 to 1901. The bureau describes Ammons as having "remained the key leader until his death in 1899", and under him the tribe kept up its annual church services and August gatherings.

=== Shore claim ===
Ammons led the tribe's effort to recover the shore strip, which ran from Westerly to Pawtucket and which the commission had rejected in 1881. In November 1893 he and the surviving council members told former commissioners Dwight R. Adams and George Carmichael Jr. that the deed had included the claim against their intent; Carmichael replied that he "had no doubt that there was an equity due them". With the help of the antiquarian James N. Arnold, Ammons and Joshua Noka pressed the claim before the General Assembly's committee in 1895, and that September the tribe named a commission headed by Ammons to pursue it. In February 1898 the Rhode Island Supreme Court advised that the 1880 act was constitutional and that the deed had conveyed the tribe's lands and claims to the state. Ammons, who valued the claim at more than $1 million, was quoted in his obituary as having "repeatedly said": "It was through the kindness of the Narragansett Indians that Roger Williams was permitted to remain in Rhode Island. I believe that justice will be done to us by the State."

=== Succession dispute (1896–1897) ===
By 1896 Ammons's son George had replaced him as chairman of the council. At a tribal meeting on February 27, 1896, which also resolved to sue the state for $4 million, members dissatisfied with the claim's progress voted out the Ammons leadership and elected Abram R. Champlin; the Ammonses did not accept the result. (Note: The Evening Bulletin of February 28, 1896, names George as the chief deposed (The Evening Bulletin 1896a, p. 8); later reports and Gideon's obituaries name Gideon (The Providence Journal 1896b, p. 9; The Evening Bulletin 1899, p. 5). Mandell treats George as council president from 1896 to 1923 without mentioning Champlin (Mandell 2008, p. 220), while George's 1923 obituary says he became "the accepted head of the tribe" at his father's death (The Evening Tribune 1923, p. 3).) In May 1896 Gideon Ammons presided over a rival meeting at Shannock, despite a deputy sheriff's notice forbidding it, which placed the claim with a Worcester lawyer. In 1897, at about 85, he still claimed "to be the only genuine chief", his "bent form" a familiar sight at the State House hearings. George nonetheless became the tribe's principal leader; the Bureau of Indian Affairs describes him as one who "stood practically in the relation of chief" until his death in 1923.

== Personal life ==
In 1846 Ammons married Caroline Rodman, daughter of Isaac Rodman; they had two children, Alexander R. Ammons (1848–1885) and Luthenia (1850–1903). Alexander served in the Union Army with the United States Colored Troops, later worked as a stevedore, loading and unloading ships on the Providence waterfront, and drowned in the Providence River. His second wife, Sarah Eleazer, was a Shinnecock from Sag Harbor; they had eight children, including George Gideon (1856–1923) and Emma Jane (Ammons) Powell. He was a widower by 1880.

== Death and legacy ==
Ammons, then infirm with rheumatism, went missing from his home in Charlestown on November 5, 1899. Hunters found his body in the woods on December 3; the town's death register records that he had drowned in a swamp.

Locally Ammons was known as "Uncle Gid", and his obituary called him "the oracle of the tribe", a teller of stories about the Great Swamp Fight and the tribe's royal burying ground. In the winter of 1896–97 Judge Nathan B. Lewis visited him, described him as "for many years President of the Indian Council", and recorded his account of local traditions. In 1936 his daughter Emma, then one of the tribe's oldest members, remembered him in The Narragansett Dawn as "of the old council" and said that the state had not been "just fair with its rapid dealings with the Indians". Newspapers in Providence, Boston and Fall River reported his death as that of "the last of the chiefs, or presidents of the council".

== Sources ==
- Gideon Ammons, Jr. v. School District No. 5, in the Town of Charlestown, Rhode Island Supreme Court, January 15, 1864, 7 R.I. 596
- "The Last Chief", Appleton's Annual Cyclopædia and Register of Important Events of the Year 1899, New York: D. Appleton and Company, 1900, p. 747 – via Google Books
- Boissevain, Ethel (Summer 1956), "The Detribalization of the Narragansett Indians: A Case Study", Ethnohistory, 3 (3): 225–245, JSTOR 480409
- "Recent Deaths: The Last of the Narragansett Chiefs", Boston Evening Transcript, p. 5, December 4, 1899 – via Google News Archive
- Bureau of Indian Affairs (July 29, 1982), Recommendation and Summary of Evidence for Proposed Finding for Federal Acknowledgment of the Narragansett Indian Tribe of Rhode Island (PDF), United States Department of the Interior
- Charlestown Historical Society, Charlestown, Rhode Island: Births, Deaths & Marriages 1738–1849 (PDF)
- Charlestown Historical Society (November 2015), Charlestown, Rhode Island Deaths 1850–1930 (PDF)
- Clauson, J. Earl (March 11, 1934), "Chief Claims to Fame", The Providence Sunday Journal, Providence, Rhode Island, p. 21 – via NewsBank
- Commission on the Affairs of the Narragansett Indians (1881), Report of the Commission on the Affairs of the Narragansett Indians, Made to the General Assembly at Its January Session, 1881, Providence: E. L. Freeman – via HathiTrust
- Commission on the Affairs of the Narragansett Indians (1882), Second Annual Report of the Commission on the Affairs of the Narragansett Indians, Made to the General Assembly at Its January Session, 1882, Providence: E. L. Freeman – via HathiTrust
- Commission on the Affairs of the Narragansett Indians (1884), Fourth Annual Report of the Commission on the Affairs of the Narragansett Indians, Made to the General Assembly at Its January Session, 1884, Providence: E. L. Freeman – via HathiTrust
- Committee of Investigation (1880), Narragansett Tribe of Indians: Report of the Committee of Investigation; A Historical Sketch, and Evidence Taken, Made to the House of Representatives at Its January Session, A.D. 1880, Providence: E. L. Freeman – via Internet Archive
- DeLucia, Christine M. (2018), Memory Lands: King Philip's War and the Place of Violence in the Northeast, New Haven: Yale University Press, ISBN 978-0-300-20117-8
- Dumpson, Taylor A. (January 2022), "A 385-Year Experiment to Erase a People: Intergenerational Acts of Genocide Against the Narragansett Indian Tribe by the United States of America and the State of Rhode Island", Tribal Law Journal, 21 (1): 89–124
- "Last of Indian Chiefs: Gideon Ammons, a Famous Narragansett Indian, Is Dead", Fall River Herald, Fall River, Massachusetts, December 5, 1899 – via Newspapers.com
- Griffin, Joseph H. (1858), Report of the Commissioner on the Narragansett Tribe of Indians, Made to the General Assembly, at Its January Session, 1858, Providence: Knowles, Anthony & Co., State Printers – via Rhode Island State Archives, Narragansett Indian collection
- Rhode Island Supreme Court (1898), Opinion of the Justices of the Supreme Court Relative to Chapter 800 of the Public Laws (The Narragansett Indians), Given to the Senate, at the January Session, 1898, Providence: E. L. Freeman & Sons, State Printers, Also reported as In re Narragansett Indians, 20 R.I. 715, 40 A. 347
- Lewis, Nathan B. (1899), "The Last of the Narragansetts", Proceedings of the Worcester Society of Antiquity for the Year 1897, Collections of the Worcester Society of Antiquity, vol. 16, Worcester, Massachusetts: Worcester Society of Antiquity, pp. 27–51 – via Google Books
- Mandell, Daniel R. (2008), Tribe, Race, History: Native Americans in Southern New England, 1780–1880, Baltimore: Johns Hopkins University Press
- Murphree, Daniel S., ed. (2012), "Rhode Island", Native America: A State-by-State Historical Encyclopedia, vol. 3, Santa Barbara, California: Greenwood (ABC-CLIO), ISBN 978-0-313-38126-3
- Murphy, Francis L. (October 15, 1958), "Segregation in R.I.", Background, The Evening Bulletin, Providence, Rhode Island, p. 39 – via NewsBank
- Hannah Hazard (October 1935), "Data on Old Indian Church", The Narragansett Dawn, vol. 1, no. 6, Oakland, Rhode Island: Narragansett Tribe of Indians, p. 153 – via DigitalCommons@URI, University of Rhode Island Special Collections
- "Sunrise News Items", The Narragansett Dawn, vol. 1, no. 10, Oakland, Rhode Island: Narragansett Tribe of Indians, pp. 243–244, February 1936 – via DigitalCommons@URI, University of Rhode Island Special Collections
- "Perseverance", Narragansett Indian Tribe
- "General Assembly", The Evening Bulletin, Providence, Rhode Island, p. 1, January 27, 1864 – via NewsBank
- "Narragansett Indians: Their Land Case Being Prepared for Presentation to the Legislature", The Evening Bulletin, Providence, Rhode Island, p. 8, November 27, 1894 – via NewsBank
- "Alas, Poor Lo! George G. Ammons, Chief of the Narragansetts Deposed", The Evening Bulletin, Providence, Rhode Island, p. 8, February 28, 1896 – via NewsBank
- "War Paint Ready: Important Meeting of Narragansett Indians May 28", The Evening Bulletin, Providence, Rhode Island, p. 11, May 18, 1896 – via NewsBank
- "At Work Again: General Assembly Resumed January Session To-day", The Evening Bulletin, Providence, Rhode Island, p. 12, April 13, 1897 – via NewsBank
- "The Last Chief: Head of the Narragansett Tribe of Indians Dead", The Evening Bulletin, Providence, Rhode Island, p. 5, December 4, 1899 – via NewsBank
- "George Ammons Laid at Rest: One of Few Survivors of the Nyantic Indians, Buried To-day", The Evening Tribune, Providence, Rhode Island, p. 3, December 7, 1923 – via Google News Archive
- "Narragansett Indians: Council Met in Conference with Indian Commissioner George Carmichael, Jr., at Shannock", The Providence Journal, Providence, Rhode Island, p. 1, November 6, 1893 – via NewsBank
- "Shore Claim Heard Again", The Providence Journal, Providence, Rhode Island, p. 4, May 15, 1895 – via NewsBank
- "The Narragansetts: Meeting in the Indians' Interest at Shannock Yesterday", The Providence Journal, Providence, Rhode Island, p. 9, May 29, 1896 – via NewsBank
- "Indian's Ancestor Seeks $4,000,000: Rev. Daniel Sekater of Westerly Plans Civil Action Against State of R. I.", The Providence Sunday Journal, Providence, Rhode Island, p. 2, March 22, 1931 – via NewsBank
- Rhode Island State Census, 1885, Entry for Gideon Ammons, Charlestown, Washington County, district 210 – via FamilySearch
- Rhode Island, Vital Records, 1846–1898, 1901–1955, Deaths registered in Charlestown, 1899: Gideon L. Ammons – via FamilySearch
- Rhode Island, Town Deaths and Burials Index, 1639–1932, Deaths registered in South Kingstown, 1903: Luthenia Ammonds – via FamilySearch
- Rhode Island, Vital Records, 1846–1898, 1901–1955, Return of a death: George Gideon Ammons, Charlestown, December 4, 1923 – via FamilySearch
- Renaud, Julia; Fisher, Linford; Spears, Lorén M. (2026), "A Legacy of Service: The Nocake/Noka Family and the Indigenous Veterans Monument", Rhode Tour, John Nicholas Brown Center for Public Humanities and Cultural Heritage; Rhode Island Historical Society; Rhode Island Council for the Humanities
- Robinson, Paul A. (2014) [1996], "Narragansett", in Davis, Mary B. (ed.), Native America in the Twentieth Century: An Encyclopedia, New York: Routledge, pp. 369–370, ISBN 978-1-135-63854-2
- Rubertone, Patricia E. (2001), Grave Undertakings: An Archaeology of Roger Williams and the Narragansett Indians, Washington, D.C.: Smithsonian Institution Press – via Internet Archive
- Rubertone, Patricia E. (2020), Native Providence: Memory, Community, and Survivance in the Northeast, Lincoln: University of Nebraska Press, ISBN 978-1-4962-1755-4
- Shoemaker, Nancy (Spring 2013), "Mr. Tashtego: Native American Whalemen in Antebellum New England", Journal of the Early Republic, 33 (1): 109–132
- United States Census, 1870, Entry for Gideon Amons and Sarah A. Amons, Charlestown, Washington County, Rhode Island – via FamilySearch
- United States Census, 1880, Entry for Gideon Ammons, Charlestown, Washington County, Rhode Island – via FamilySearch
