= Leslie Brown =

Leslie Brown may refer to:

- Leslie Brown (RAF officer) (1893–1978), Royal Air Force officer who served in World War II
- Leslie Brown (historian) (1954–2016), American historian
- Leslie E. Brown (1920–1997), U.S. Marine aviator
- Leslie Brown (bishop) (1912–1999), Archbishop of Uganda
- Leslie C. Brown (born 1945), former member of the Ohio House of Representatives
- Leslie Brown (bowls), Fijian bowls player, medallist at 1950 British Empire Games
- Leslie Brown (English footballer) (1936–2021), English football midfielder
- Leslie Hilton Brown (1917–1980), British ornithologist
- Darby Brown (1929–1988, born Leslie Brown), Australian boxer of the 1940s and 1950s
- Leslie Brown (Scottish footballer), Scottish footballer of the 1950s

== See also ==
- Leslie Browne (born 1957), American ballet dancer and actress
- Les Brown (disambiguation)
