= Franklin's Jackass =

Franklin's Jackass is a reference to a witticism allegedly made by Benjamin Franklin, in which he derided property qualifications on the right to vote by asking whether the right to vote belongs to the man or to the jackass that he owns. According to Alexander Keyssar, it was a widely known reference in the American Revolutionary Era and was mentioned at several state constitutional conventions in the years after the American Revolution.

== Franklin's quotation ==
"Franklin's Jackass" comes from the following query allegedly posed by Benjamin Franklin:

Today a man owns a jackass worth fifty dollars and he is entitled to vote; but before the next election the jackass dies. The man in the meantime has become more experienced, his knowledge of the principles of government, and his acquaintance with mankind, are more extensive, and he is therefore better qualified to make a proper selection of rulers—but the jackass is dead and the man cannot vote. Now gentlemen, pray inform me, in whom is the right of suffrage? In the man or in the jackass?
