= Chris Clarke =

Chris Clarke may refer to:

- Chris Clarke (sprinter) (born 1990), English sprinter
- Chris Clarke (boxer) (born 1956), Canadian boxer
- Chris Clarke (croquet player) (born 1971), English croquet player
- Chris Clarke (footballer, born 1980), English footballer
- Chris Clarke (footballer, born 1974), English footballer
- Chris Clarke (politician) (1941–2009), British Liberal Democrat politician
- Chris Clarke (soccer) (born 1978), Canadian soccer player
- Chris Clarke, fictional character on BBC soap opera EastEnders
- Christopher Clarke (judge) (born 1947), English judge
- Chris Clarke (baseball) (born 1998), American professional baseball player

== See also ==
- Chris Clark (disambiguation)
- Christopher Clark (disambiguation)
