= Merritt Roe Smith =

American historian

- Born: 1940 (age 85–86)
- Education: Georgetown University; Pennsylvania State University
- Occupations: Historian, educator

Merritt Roe Smith (born 1940) is an American historian. He is the Leverett and William Cutten Professor of the History of Technology at the Massachusetts Institute of Technology.

== Life ==
Smith graduated from Georgetown University, and Pennsylvania State University with a Ph.D. His research focuses on the history of technological innovation and social change. He is currently writing a monograph on technology and the American Civil War. Smith is a Fellow of the American Academy of Arts and Sciences, and he is past president of the Society for the History of Technology.

In the 1970s, Smith made a large contribution to our understanding of how interchangeability of mechanical parts went from concept to realization. He did this by rescuing from obscurity the work of gunmaker John Hall at the Harpers Ferry Armory. During 1815–1834, Hall had assembled elements of standardization and combined it with new machine designs and effective team management to realize the long-desired goal of true parts interchangeability. Hall's innovative breechloading US Rifle Model 1819 was the first product ever made in large numbers whose components could be freely exchanged with one another and still function. Earlier industrial historians had often credited Eli Whitney with perfecting standardized parts, but although Whitney did make some progress toward the goal, he ultimately gave up the effort. Smith's research on Hall's work at Harpers Ferry has put the Maine craftsman back in his proper position in the industrial pantheon. (David Hounshell, From the American System to Mass Production, 1800-1932, p. 29.) Hall's manufacturing technique became known as the American System, and today it is widespread. "Although recognized by his contemporaries as a major contributor to the American System," wrote industrial historian David Hounshell in 1984, "John H. Hall escaped the attention of modern historians until recently. Merritt Roe Smith's Harpers Ferry and the New Technology has provided an outstanding study of Hall's achievements." (Hounshell, American System, p. 39.)

== Awards ==
- Nominated for the 1977 Pulitzer Prize in History.
- 1977 Frederick Jackson Turner Award.
- Leonardo da Vinci Medal, from Society for the History of Technology in 1994.

== Works ==
- "Technology, Industrialization, and the Idea of Progress in America"
- "Industry, Technology, and the 'Labor Question' in 19th-Century America"
- Harpers Ferry Armory and the New Technology. Cornell University Press. 1977. ISBN 978-0-8014-9181-8. (reprint 1980)
- Merritt Roe Smith, ed. (1985). Military Enterprise and Technological Change. MIT Press. ISBN 978-0-262-19239-2.
- Merritt Roe Smith; Leo Marx, eds. (1994). Does Technology Drive History?. MIT Press. ISBN 978-0-262-69167-3.
- Major Problems in the History of American Technology (1998), co-edited with Gregory Clancey
- Pauline Maier; Merritt Roe Smith; Alexander Keyssar; Daniel Kevles (2003). Inventing America. W. W. Norton & Company. ISBN 978-0-393-16814-3. (reprint 2006)
