= Anglos and Mexicans in the Making of Texas, 1836–1986 =

1987 book by David Montejano

- Author: David Montejano
- Language: English
- Genre: Non-fiction
- Publisher: University of Texas Press
- Publication date: 1987
- Publication place: United States

Anglos and Mexicans in the Making of Texas, 1836–1986 is a non fiction book by David Montejano, published in 1987 by the University of Texas Press. It discusses the inter-ethnic and inter-racial relations between Mexican Americans and non-Hispanic white Americans in Texas.

There is a version in Spanish, titled Anglos y mexicanos en la formación de Texas: 1836–1986, published in 1991 by Alianza Editorial in Spain.

== Contents ==
The book is divided into four parts by year span. The parts cover, respectively, 1836–1900, 1900–1920, 1920–1940, and 1940–1986. The sections are titled Incorporation, Reconstruction, Segregation, and Integration, respectively.

The first discusses how after the Texas Revolution and later the Texas annexation, the non-Hispanic whites took financial and political supremacy over Mexican-descended Texans. The second part shows the reorientation of the Texas economy towards settled agriculture, when previously ranching was the primary economic engine, and how this resulted in repression against Texans of Mexican origin. The third section describes how Anglo-dominated Texas enacted racially discriminatory laws against Texans of Mexican origins. The final section shows how, in a more urban-oriented Texas, segregation declined and the order is more favorable to Texans of Mexican origins.

== Reception ==
The book won the 1988 Frederick Jackson Turner Award.

Rodolfo O. de la Garza of the University of Texas at Austin stated that the work "is the most comprehensive and insightful history of Anglo-Mexican relations in Texas yet written." de la Garza did argue that the book did not prove the theory the author intended.

David R. Maciel of the University of New Mexico described the book as "an outstanding contribution".

Avelardo Valdez of the University of Texas at San Antonio described the book as "a benchmark publication" that is "a significant addition" in its field and that it is "meticulously documented". He had some criticisms he characterized as minor.

== See also ==
- History of Mexican Americans in Texas
