= Adam Rome =

American environmental historian

Adam Ward Rome
- Education: Yale University; University of Kansas
- Scientific career
- Fields: Environmental history
- Workplaces: Pennsylvania State University

Adam Ward Rome is an American environmental historian. In his book Bulldozer in the Countryside, he examines how the post World War II residential construction boom and its resulting urban sprawl contributed to the rise of the modern environmental movement.

== Life ==
Rome graduated from Yale University summa cum laude, studied at Oxford University as a Rhodes Scholar, and earned his Ph.D. from the University of Kansas. From 2002 to 2005 he edited Environmental History. He is a professor of environment and sustainability at the University at Buffalo.

== Awards ==
- 2002 Frederick Jackson Turner Award
- 2003 Lewis Mumford Award

== Works ==
- The Genius of Earth Day: How a 1970 Teach-In Unexpectedly Made the First Green Generation, Hill and Wang, 2013, ISBN 9780809040506
- The bulldozer in the countryside: suburban sprawl and the rise of American environmentalism. Cambridge University Press. 2001. ISBN 978-0-521-80490-5. "Adam Rome."
- Hidden places. University for Man. 1984.
