= Marisa J. Fuentes =

American historian

Marisa J. Fuentes is a writer, historian, and academic from the United States. She is an Associate Professor of Women & Gender Studies and History and the Presidential Term Chair in African American History at Rutgers University, where she has taught since 2009.

== Career ==
Fuentes is a historian of the seventeenth- and eighteenth-century Atlantic world; her work focuses more specifically on slavery, race, gender, and sexuality in the early modern Caribbean. Her book Dispossessed Lives: Enslaved Women, Violence, and the Archive (2016), which developed new historical methodologies for understanding and thinking about the difficult-to-access experiences of enslaved women in eighteenth-century Bridgetown, Barbados, won the 2016 Berkshire Conference of Women Historians Book Prize, the 2017 Caribbean Studies Association Barbara Christian Prize, and the 2017 Association of Black Women Historians Letitia Woods Brown Memorial Book Award.

Fuentes is also the co-editor of the volume Scarlet and Black: Slavery and Dispossession in Rutgers History (2016) and the co-editor of a 2016 special issue of History of the Present on the ethical and historiographical challenges faced by scholars writing about slavery. Currently she is consulting editor of the Journal of the History of Ideas.

== Publications ==
Books

- Dispossessed Lives: Enslaved Women, Violence and the Archive in the Urban British Caribbean (University of Pennsylvania Press, 2016)
- Scarlet and Black: Slavery and Dispossession in Rutgers History, Volume I co-edited with Deborah Gray White (New Brunswick: Rutgers University Press, 2016)

Journals and Articles

- “Slavery and the Archive” (special issue) History of the Present co- edited with Brian Connolly 6:2 (November 2016): 105-215
- “Power and Historical Figuring: Rachael Pringle Polgreen’s Troubled Archive.” Gender & History Volume 22(3) November 2010: 564-584.
