= Charles Postel =

American historian

Academic background
- Education: University of California, Berkeley

Academic work
- Discipline: History of Science
- Institutions: San Francisco State University

Charles Postel is an American historian and professor at San Francisco State University. He studied at Laney College in Oakland before receiving his B.A. in history from the University of California, Berkeley, in 1995, and his Ph.D. in history from UC Berkeley in 2002. Postel's scholarship focuses on politics and social movements in the United States during the Gilded Age and the Progressive Era. He is best known for his 2007 book examining Populism in the United States and the People's Party during the late nineteenth century and early twentieth century, The Populist Vision, about which the Longview Institute said,

Elegantly written, meticulously researched, The Populist Vision is an enthralling history of the movement that created the most pervasive political impulse in American politics. Postel's book has won both the Frederick Jackson Turner and Bancroft awards, which it justly deserves. His work also helps us to understand the actual Populist Vision that lies behind the superficial and shallow rhetoric to which we’ve been subjected during this election year.

His 2019 book, Equality: An American Dilemma, 1866-1896, is about the powerful social movements unleashed in the aftermath of the Civil War during the Reconstruction era, including their often clashing claims to racial, sexual, and economic equality. In her review of the book, historian Crystal N. Feimster, Associate Professor of African American Studies at Yale University, wrote:

Equality is a deeply researched, beautifully written, and brilliantly argued history of the epic struggle to define the meaning of equality in post-Civil War America. This magnificent portrait of the farmers' Grange, the Women's Christian Temperance Union, and the Knights of Labor is filled with fresh insights into the social movements that took root during Reconstruction and blossomed in the Gilded Age. Confronting some of the most difficult questions in American history, Postel adds new dimensions to our understanding of the racial, gender, and class inequalities that continue to shape our social and political landscape."

== Awards ==
- 2008 Bancroft Prize
- 2008 Frederick Jackson Turner Award

== Works ==
- The Populist Vision. Oxford University Press. 2007. ISBN 978-0-19-517650-6.
- Equality: An American Dilemma, 1866-1896. Farrar, Straus, and Giroux. 2019. ISBN 978-0-80-907963-6.
- "What We Talk about When We Talk about Populism," Raritan: A Quarterly Review, Fall 2017, vol. 37, no. 2
- "If Trump and Sanders Are Both Populists, What Does Populism Mean?" The American Historian (August 2016)
