= Aaron Sachs (historian) =

American historian (born 1969)

- Born: 1969 (age 56–57)
- Education: Harvard University (BA); Yale University (PhD)
- Occupation: Historian

Aaron Sachs (born 1969) is an American historian and Cornell University professor who primarily studies American environmental and cultural history.

== Life ==
He graduated from Harvard University in 1992 with a B.A. in history and literature, and from Yale University, with a Ph.D. in American Studies, in 2004. He currently is Professor of History and American Studies at Cornell University in Ithaca, New York.

== Awards ==
- 2007 Frederick Jackson Turner Award honorable mention.
- 2023 National Book Critics Circle Award in Biography Finalist.

== Selected publications ==
- Stay Cool: Why Dark Comedy Matters in the Fight Against Climate Change (New York University Press, 2023) ISBN 1479819395
- Up from the Depths: Herman Melville, Lewis Mumford, and Rediscovery in Dark Times (Princeton University Press, 2022) ISBN 9780691215419
- Arcadian America: The Death and Life of an Environmental Tradition (Yale University Press, 2013)
- "Special Topics in Calamity History", Reviews in American History, Volume 35, Number 3, September 2007, pp. 453–463
- The Humboldt Current: Nineteenth-Century Exploration and the Roots of American Environmentalism. Viking. 2006. ISBN 978-0-14-311192-4. (reprint Penguin 2007)
