= Impossible Subjects =

2004 nonfiction book by Mae M. Ngai

Impossible Subjects: Illegal Aliens and the Making of Modern America
- Author: Mae M. Ngai
- Series: Politics and Society in Twentieth-Century America
- Subject: U.S. history
- Genre: Non-fiction
- Publisher: Princeton University Press
- Publication date: 2004
- Media type: Print (hardcover)
- Pages: 416
- ISBN: 9781400850235
- Followed by: The Lucky Ones: One Family and the Extraordinary Invention of Chinese America

Impossible Subjects: Illegal Aliens and the Making of Modern America, is a Frederick Jackson Turner Award-winning book by historian Mae M. Ngai published by Princeton University Press in 2004.

== Background ==
Impossible Subjects was written by Mae M. Ngai and published in 2004 by Princeton University Press. Impossible Subjects was Ngai's first full-length book, and she has also published a number of works in major newspapers and academic journals. Ngai graduated from Empire State College with a B.A. and went on to Columbia University where she earned her M.A. in 1993 and her Ph.D. in 1998. Currently, Ngai is a professor of Asian American Studies and History at Columbia University in New York City and focuses on the invention of racial categories, specifically looking at the creation of Chinese racial categories.

== Content ==
The book examines legislation, court cases, and attitudes in the late nineteenth and early twentieth centuries that affected immigration. Through Ngai's analyses of these factors, readers are shown the long-lasting impacts these cases had on racial categories in the United States, and the way that they were aimed at maintaining whiteness.

The book explores the history of immigration policy and border patrol in the United States, particularly its impact on race relations. In the introduction, Ngai explains the purpose of the book saying, "immigrants are integral to the historical processes that define and redefine the nation." She breaks the introduction into three sections which are "Immigration and Citizenship," "Immigration Policy and the Production of Racial Knowledge," and "Nationalism and Sovereignty." She also begins to discuss several immigration laws that were enacted throughout the history of the U.S. including the Johnson-Reed Act of 1924.

Part One deals with the origins of anti-immigration policy and nativism in United States politics during the early 20th century, particularly the use of gradated categories of "whiteness" to permit or deny entry of immigrants from certain European and Asian countries. This section examines the different factors impacting immigration, including the need for cheap industrial labor and xenophobia. Various pieces of legislation are discussed, particularly the Immigration Act of 1924.

Part Two, she focuses on migrants from the Philippines and Mexico in the 1920s by discussing their role in the U.S. economy and how they challenged cultural norms about the traditional work force. The conclusion of the Spanish–American War and the racialization of Mexican immigrants, who had previously been considered white, are focuses of the section.

In Part Three, Ngai examines the shift of regulations around Japanese-Americans and Chinese-Americans especially their eligibility for citizenship. She uses Japanese internment camps as evidence of their lack of legal and social inclusion in the United States.

In Part Four, she analyzes the next era in immigration policy which she suggests is embodied in the Hart-Celler Act. She discusses how immigration policy was affected during the years of 1945-1965 by World War II. She concludes Part Four by showing how the immigration policies during the time period after 1965 contributed to increased illegal immigration and heightened a seemingly unsolvable problem going forward.

== Critical reception ==
In his review in The New Yorker, Louis Menard praises Ngai's book for demonstrating how the categories of "legal" and "illegal" immigrants "are administrative constructions, always subject to change; they do not tell us anything about the desirability of the persons so constructed."

== Awards ==
- 2005 Frederick Jackson Turner Award
- 2005 Lora Romero First Book Publication Prize, American Studies Association
- 2004 Co-winner of History Book Award, Association for Asian American Studies
- 2004 Co-winner of the First Book Prize, Berkshire Conference of Women Historians
- 2004 Littleton-Griswold Prize, American Historical Association
- 2004 Theodore Saloutos Book Award, Immigration and Ethnic History Society

== Sources ==
- Ngai, Mae M. (2014). Impossible Subjects: Illegal Aliens and the Making of Modern America. Princeton University Press. ISBN 978-0-691-16082-5.
