= Robert E. Quirk =

American historian (1918–2009)

- Born: September 22, 1918
- Died: May 23, 2009 (aged 90)
- Occupation: Historian
- Awards: Frederick Jackson Turner Award (1961)

Robert E. Quirk (September 22, 1918 – May 23, 2009) was an American historian, and professor emeritus at Indiana University.

== Awards ==
- 1961 Frederick Jackson Turner Award
- 1965 Guggenheim Fellow

== Works ==
- Robert E. Quirk, ed. (2007). When you come home: a wartime courtship in letters, 1941-45. Wayne State University Press. ISBN 978-0-8143-3334-1.
- Fidel Castro. W. W. Norton & Company. 1995. ISBN 978-0-393-31327-7.
- The Mexican Revolution and the Catholic Church, 1910-1929. Greenwood Press. April 23, 1986. ISBN 978-0-313-25121-4.
- An affair of honor: Woodrow Wilson and the occupation of Veracruz. W. W. Norton & Company. 1967. ISBN 978-0-393-00390-1.
