= Chris Clark (politician) =

American politician

Mayor of Mountain View, California
- In office January 7, 2014 – January 6, 2015
- Preceded by: John Inks
- Succeeded by: John McAlister

Personal details
- Born: September 14, 1983 (age 42) Rozetta, Illinois
- Education: Stanford University
- Profession: Politician

Christopher Ryan Clark (born September 14, 1983) is an American politician and former Mayor of Mountain View, California. He was first elected to the Mountain View City Council in 2012 at age 29, making him the youngest and first openly LGBT elected official in the city’s history. Clark was subsequently elected mayor in January 2014 as one of the youngest mayors in the United States.

== Biography ==
Clark grew up on a farm in Rozetta, Illinois and later served as a Page for the US House of Representatives. He attended Stanford University and earned a B.A. in Political Science with a minor in Economics. While Vice Mayor, In 2013, Clark completed Harvard University's John F. Kennedy School of Government program for Senior Executives in State and Local Government as a David Bohnett LGBTQ Victory Institute Leadership Fellow.

== Career ==
Clark ran unsuccessfully for city council in 2008 and subsequently served on the Human Relations and Environmental Planning Commissions before winning his 2012 election bid. He was the highest non-incumbent vote-getter and elected vice mayor by the council soon after taking office in January 2013.
