= Camille Robcis =

Intellectual historian (born 1977)

- Born: 1977 (age 48–49)
- Education: Brown University; Cornell University
- Occupations: Professor; Historian
- Employer: Columbia University
- Notable work: The Law of Kinship; Disalienation
- Awards: Guggenheim Fellowship

Camille Robcis (born 1977) is a scholar of French intellectual history and author. She is a professor of French and history at Columbia University. She won a Guggenheim Fellowship in 2020. Her books are The Law of Kinship: Anthropology, Psychoanalysis, and the Family in France (Cornell University Press, 2013) and Disalienation: Politics, Philosophy, and Radical Psychiatry in France (University of Chicago Press, 2021). The Law of Kinship won the Berkshire Conference of Women Historians Book Prize.

Robcis attended Brown University for college, majoring in history and modern culture and media. She graduated in 1999. In 2007, she earned a doctorate in history from Cornell University, supervised by Dominick LaCapra. She then taught at Cornell for 10 years before moving to Columbia University.

Robcis is working on a third book, tentatively titled The Gender Question: Populism, National Reproduction, and the Crisis of Representation.
