= Mary O. Furner =

American historian

- Education: Northwestern University
- Occupation(s): Historian, educator

Mary O. Furner is an American historian.

== Life ==
She graduated from Northwestern University, with a Ph.D., in 1972. Her monograph, Advocacy and Objectivity: A Crisis in the Professionalization of American Social Science, 1865-1905 (University of Kentucky Press), won the Frederick Jackson Turner Award in 1973. She is Professor of History at University of California, Santa Barbara.

== Awards ==
- 1973 Frederick Jackson Turner Award
- 1982 Woodrow Wilson International Center for Scholars Fellow
- 1988-89 National Endowment for the Humanities Fellow
- 2007 Fulbright Distinguished Chair in American Studies, Goethe University Frankfurt

== Works ==
- Advocacy and Objectivity: A Crisis in the Professionalization of American Social Science, 1865-1905. University of Kentucky Press. 1975. ISBN 978-0-8131-1309-8.
- Michael James Lacey; Mary O. Furner, eds. (1993). "The republican tradition and the new liberalism: social investigation, state building, and social learning in the Gilded Age". The State and Social Investigation in Britain and the United States. Cambridge University Press. ISBN 978-0-521-41638-2.
- Mary O. Furner (December 1, 1996). "Antistatism and Government Downsizing". The Urban Institute.
- Mary O. Furner; Barry Supple, eds. (2002). The State and Economic Knowledge: The American and British Experiences. Cambridge University Press. ISBN 978-0-521-52315-8.
- Mary O. Furner (July 15, 2009). "Until state's fixed, UC system's in jeopardy". The Sacramento Bee. Archived from the original on July 18, 2009.
- Inquiring Minds Want to Know: Social Investigation In History And Theory. Modern Intellectual History / Volume 6 / Issue 01 / April 2009, pp 147 – 170 DOI: 10.1017/S14“Defining the Public Good in the U.S. Gilded Age, 1883-1898: ‘Freedom of Contract’ versus ‘Internal Police’ in the Tortured History of Employment Law and Policy,” Journal of the Gilded Age and Progressive Era 17:2 (April 2018):1-35 79244308001972, Published online: 05 March 2009
- “Ideas, Interdependencies, Governance Structures, and National Political Cultures: Norbert Elias’s Work as a Window on U.S. History,” Civilizing and Decivilizing Processes: Figurational Approaches to American Culture, eds. Christa Buschendorf, Astrid Franke, Johannes Voelz (Cambridge Scholars Press, 2011)
- “Defining the Public Good in the U.S. Gilded Age, 1883-1898: ‘Freedom of Contract’ versus ‘Internal Police’ in the Tortured History of Employment Law and Policy,” Journal of the Gilded Age and Progressive Era 17:2 (April 2018):1-35
