= David Montejano =

American sociologist and historian (born 1948)

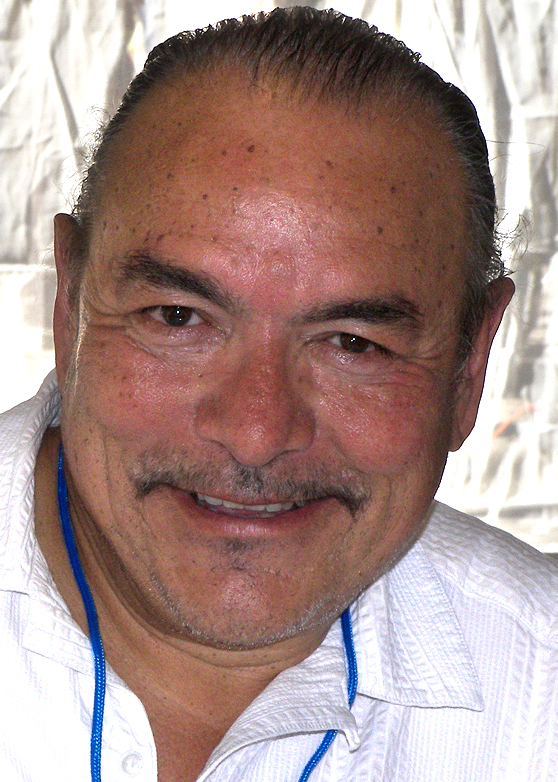
David Montejano at the 2010 Texas Book Festival.

David Montejano (born 1948), native of San Antonio, Texas, is an American sociologist and historian.

== Academic Career ==
He graduated from the University of Texas at Austin (1970), and from Yale University with a M.A. and Ph.D. (1982) in Sociology. He has taught at the University of California, Santa Cruz (1980-1982), the University of New Mexico (1985-1989), the University of Texas at Austin (1989-2002), and the University of California, Berkeley (2002-2018). At the University of Texas at Austin, he was chair of the Center for Mexican American Studies. He was also Chair of the Center for Latino Policy Research at University of California, Berkeley.

In 1995, he was inducted into the Texas Institute of Letters. From 1992 to 1998, he was State Commissioner of the Texas Commission on the Arts. In 1996-97, he was instrumental in designing the "Top 10% Plan" (Texas House Bill 588), an admissions policy for the University of Texas.

== Awards ==
- 1982 Rockefeller Post-Doctoral Fellow
- 1987–1988 School of American Research Resident Scholar in Santa Fe, National Endowment for the Humanities
- 1987 T.R. Fehrenbach Award, Texas Historical Commission, Award for Anglos and Mexicans in the Making of Texas, 1836 - 1986
- 1988 Frederick Jackson Turner Award, Organization of American Historians, Award for Anglos and Mexicans in the Making of Texas, 1836 - 1986
- 1989 Pacific Coast Branch Book Award, Pacific Coast Branch of the American Historical Association
- 1993 - 1994 Center for Advanced Study in the Behavioral Sciences Fellow at Stanford University
- 1995 Inducted, Texas Institute of Letters
- 2010 T.R. Fehrenbach Award, Texas Historical Commission, Award for Quixote's Soldiers: A Local History of the Chicano Movement, 1966 - 1981
- 2010 National Association of Chicano and Chicana Studies, Award for Quixote's Soldiers

== Works (Partial list) ==
- John Tutino, ed. (2012)."Mexican Merchants and Teamsters on the Texas Cotton Road, 1862-1865." Mexico and Mexicans in the Making of the United States. University of Texas Press. ISBN 978-0-292-73718-1.
- Sancho's Journal: Exploring the Political Edge with the Brown Berets. University of Texas Press. 2012. ISBN 978-0-292-74384-7.
- Quixote's Soldiers: A Local History of the Chicano Movement, 1966-1981 (Jack and Doris Smothers Series in Texas History, Life, and Culture). University of Texas Press. 2010. ISBN 978-0-292-72290-3.
- Maggie Rivas-Rodriguez, ed. (2005). "The Beating of Private Aguirre". Mexican Americans & World War II. University of Texas Press. ISBN 978-0-292-70681-1.
- David Montejano, ed. (1999). Chicano Politics and Society in the Late Twentieth Century. University of Texas Press. ISBN 978-0-292-75215-3.
- Anglos y mexicanos en la formación de Texas: 1836-1986. Vol. 84. Consejo Nacional para la Cultura y las Artes, 1991.
- Anglos and Mexicans in the Making of Texas, 1836-1986. University of Texas Press. 1987. ISBN 978-0-292-77596-1. - Read online at Google Books
- A journey through Mexican Texas, 1900-1930: the making of a segregated society. Yale University. 1982. ProQuest 303247894.
- Race, labor repression, and capitalist agriculture: notes from South Texas, 1920-1930. University of California, Institute for the Study of Social Change. 1977.
