= Ronald E. Shaw =

American historian (1924–2001)

- Born: 1924
- Died: April 4, 2001 (aged 76–77)
- Education: Carleton College, University of Rochester (PhD)
- Occupation: Historian
- Years active: 1947-1993
- Employer(s): Wayne State University; Miami University
- Known for: The history of the early American republic
- Title: W. E. Smith Professor of History at Miami University
- Spouse(s): Judith Ann Mortenson, 1961
- Children: 3
- Awards: Frederick Jackson Turner Award (1965)

Ronald E. Shaw (1924 – April 4, 2001) was an American historian specializing in western civilization, American social and economic history, and the history of the early American republic.

== Life ==
He served in the Army from 1943 to 1946. He earned a bachelor's degree from Carleton College in 1947 and taught at Wayne State University while pursuing graduate studies. He graduated from the University of Rochester in 1954 with a PhD.

He taught at Wayne State University, and Miami University from 1950 until 1993, the first W. E. Smith Professor of History.

== Awards ==
- 1965 Frederick Jackson Turner Award

== Works ==
- Canals for a Nation: The Canal Era in the United States, 1790-1860. University Press of Kentucky. 1993. ISBN 978-0-8131-0815-5. Reprint of 1990 volume.
- Erie Water West: A History of the Erie Canal, 1792-1854. University Press of Kentucky. 1990. ISBN 978-0-8131-0801-8. Reprint of the original 1966 volume.
