= William C. Widenor =

American historian

William C. Widenor was an American historian.

== Life ==
Widenor was born on December 15, 1937, in Easton, Pennsylvania. Widenor attended Princeton University after graduating from high school. After attending the Foreign Service, he met Mary Helen Barrett in Zurich. The two married in 1964, and moved to Berkeley, California in 1968. At Berkeley, Widenor pursued a doctorate in History. In 1973, Widenor and Barrett divorced. After receiving his PhD, Widenor then took an assistant professor position at the University of Illinois. Widenor died on January 13, 2017, in Champaign, Illinois.

Widenor was professor emeritus at University of Illinois.

== Awards ==
- 1981 Frederick Jackson Turner Award

== Works ==
- Henry Cabot Lodge and the search for an American foreign policy. University of California Press. 1980. ISBN 978-0-520-03778-6.
- "Henry Cabot Lodge: The Astute Parliamentarian." First Among Equals: Outstanding Senate Leaders of the Twentieth Century, edited by Richard A. Baker and Roger H. Davidson, pp. 38–62. Washington: Congressional Quarterly, 1991.
- John Martin Carroll; George C. Herring, eds. (1996). "The United States and the Versailles Peace Settlement". Modern American diplomacy. Rowman & Littlefield. ISBN 978-0-8420-2555-3.
