= Frederick Jackson Turner Award =

Annual prize for an author's first book on American history

The Frederick Jackson Turner Award is given each year by the Organization of American Historians for an author's first book on American history.

It was started in 1959, by the Mississippi Valley Historical Association, as the Prize Studies Award.

Year	Winner	Title
1959	Donald F. Warner	The Idea of Continuous Union: Agitation for the Annexation of Canada to the United States, 1849-1893 (University of Kentucky Press).
1960	No award given.	
1961	Robert E. Quirk	An Affair of Honor: Woodrow Wilson and the Occupation of Vera Cruz (University Press of Kentucky).
1962	Donald O. Johnson	The Challenge to American Freedoms: World War I and the Rise of the American Civil Liberties Union (University of Kentucky Press).
1963	No award given.	
1964	No award given.	
1965	Ronald E. Shaw	Erie Water West: A History of the Erie Canal, 1792-1854 (University of Kentucky).
1966	James T. Patterson	Congressional Conservatism and the New Deal: The Growth of the Conservative Coalition in Congress, 1933-1939 (University of Kentucky Press).
1967	Ross E. Paulson	Radicalism and Reform, 1837-1937 (University of Kentucky Press).
1968	No award given.	
1969	Ross Gregory	Walter Hines Page: Ambassador to the Court of St. James (University of Kentucky Press).
1970	Robert Griffith	The Politics of Fear: Joseph McCarthy and the Senate (University of Kentucky Press).
1971	John Garry Clifford	The Citizen Soldiers (University of Kentucky Press).
1972	Edward A. Purcell, Jr.	The Crisis of Democratic Theory: Scientific Naturalism and the Problem of Value (University of Kentucky Press).
1973	Mary O. Furner	Advocacy and Objectivity: A Crisis in the Professionalization of American Social Science, 1865-1905 (University of Kentucky Press).
1974	Thomas H. Bender	Toward an Urban Vision (University of Kentucky Press).
1975	No award given.	
1976	No award given.	
1977	Merritt Roe Smith,	Harpers Ferry Armory and the New Technology (Cornell University Press).
1978	Daniel T. Rodgers	Work Ethic in Industrial America, 1850-1920 (University of Chicago Press).
1979	Charles F. Fanning, Jr.	Peter Finley Dunne and Mr. Dooley: The Chicago Years (University of Kentucky Press).
1980	John Mack Faragher	Women and Men on the Overland Trail (Yale University Press).
1981	William C. Widenor	Henry Cabot Lodge and the Search for an American Foreign Policy (University of California Press).
1982	Clayborne Carson	To Struggle: SNCC and the Black Awakening of the 1960s (Harvard University Press).
1983	Rosalind Rosenberg	Beyond Separate Spheres (Yale University Press).
1984	Steven Hahn	The Roots of Southern Populism: Yeoman Farmers and the Transformation of the Georgia Upcountry, 1850-1890 (Oxford University Press).
1985	Barton C. Shaw	The Wool-Hat Boys: Georgia's Populist Party (Louisiana State University Press).
1985	Sean Wilentz	Chants Democratic: New York City and the Rise of the American Working Class, 1788-1850 (Oxford University Press).
1986	Chester M. Morgan	Redneck Liberal: Theodore G. Bilbo and the New Deal (Louisiana State University Press).
1987	Alexander Keyssar	Out of Work: The First Century of Unemployment in Massachusetts (Cambridge University Press).
1988	David Montejano	Anglos and Mexicans in the Making of Texas, 1836-1986 (University of Texas Press).
1989	Bruce Nelson	Workers on the Waterfront: Seamen, Longshoremen, and Unionism in the 1930s (University of Illinois Press).
1990	James H. Merrell	The Indians' New World: Catawbas and their Neighbors from European Contact Through the Era of Removal (The University of North Carolina Press for the Institute of Early American History and Culture).
1991	Christopher F. Clark	The Roots of Rural Capitalism: Western Massachusetts, 1780-1860 (Cornell University Press).
1992	Ramón A. Gutiérrez	When Jesus Came, the Corn Mothers Went Away: Marriage, Sexuality, and Power in New Mexico, 1500-1846 (Stanford University Press).
1993	Daniel K. Richter	The Ordeal of the Longhouse: The Peoples of the Iroquois League in the Era of European Colonization (The University of North Carolina Press for the Institute of Early American History and Culture).
1994	Peter Way	Common Labour: Workers & the Digging of North American Canals 1780-1860 (Cambridge University Press).
1995	George Chauncey	Gay New York: Gender, Urban Culture, and the Making of the Gay Male World, 1890-1940 (Basic Books).
1996	James T. Campbell	Songs of Zion: The African Methodist Episcopal Church in the United States and South Africa (Oxford University Press).
1997	Glenda Elizabeth Gilmore	Gender and Jim Crow: Women and the Politics of White Supremacy in North Carolina, 1896-1920, (The University of North Carolina Press).
1998	Neil Foley	White Scourge: Mexicans, Blacks, and Poor Whites in Texas Cotton Culture, (University of California Press).
1999	Amy Dru Stanley	From Bondage to Contract: Wage Labor, Marriage, and the Market in the Age of Slave Emancipation (Cambridge University Press).
2000	Timothy B. Tyson, University of Wisconsin-Madison	Radio Free Dixie: Robert F. Williams and the Roots of Black Power (University of North Carolina Press).
2000	Walter Johnson, New York University	Soul by Soul: Life Inside the Antebellum Slave Market (Harvard University Press).
2001	Lisa Norling, University of Minnesota	Captain Ahab Had a Wife: New England Women and the Whalefishery, 1720-1870 (The University of North Carolina Press).
2002	Adam Rome, Pennsylvania State University	The Bulldozer in the Countryside: Suburban Sprawl and the Rise of American Environmentalism (Cambridge University Press).
2003	James F. Brooks, University of California, Santa Barbara	Captives and Cousins: Slavery, Kinship, and Community in the Southwest Borderlands (University of North Carolina Press).
2004	Thomas A. Guglielmo, University of Notre Dame	White on Arrival: Italians, Race, Color, and Power in Chicago, 1890-1945 (Oxford University Press).
2005	Mae M. Ngai, University of Chicago	Impossible Subjects: Illegal Aliens and the Making of Modern America (Princeton University Press).
2006	Tiya Miles, University of Michigan	Ties that Bind: The Story of an Afro-Cherokee Family in Slavery and Freedom (University of California Press).
2006 Honorable Mention	Eiichiro Azuma, University of Pennsylvania	Between Two Empires: Race, History, and Transnationalism in Japanese America (Oxford University Press).
2007	Ned Blackhawk, University of Wisconsin, Madison	Violence over the Land: Indians and Empires in the Early American West (Harvard University Press).
2007 Honorable Mention	Aaron Sachs, Cornell University	The Humboldt Current: Nineteenth-Century Exploration and the Roots of American Environmentalism (Viking).
2008	Charles Postel, California State University, Sacramento	The Populist Vision (Oxford University Press).
2009	Leslie Brown, Williams College	Upbuilding Black Durham: Gender, Class, and Black Community Development in the Jim Crow South (The University of North Carolina Press).
2010	Bethany Moreton, University of Georgia	To Serve God and Wal-Mart: The Making of Christian Free Enterprise (Harvard University Press).
2010 Honorable Mention	Charlotte Brooks, Baruch College	Alien Neighbors, Foreign Friends: Asian Americans, Housing, and the Transformation of Urban California (University of Chicago Press).
2010 Honorable Mention	Christine Keiner, Rochester Institute of Technology	The Oyster Question: Scientists, Watermen, and the Maryland Chesapeake Bay since 1880 (University of Georgia Press).
2010 Honorable Mention	Lisa Levenstein, The University of North Carolina at Greensboro	A Movement without Marches: African American Women and the Politics of Poverty in Postwar Philadelphia (University of North Carolina Press).
2011	Danielle L. McGuire, Wayne State University	At the Dark End of the Street: Black Women, Rape, and Resistance–a New History of the Civil Rights Movement from Rosa Parks to the Rise of Black Power (Alfred A. Knopf).
2012	David Sehat, Georgia State University	The Myth of American Religious Freedom (Oxford University Press).
2012 Honorable Mention	James T. Sparrow, University of Chicago	Warfare State: World War II Americans and the Age of Big Government (Oxford University Press).
2013	Jonathan Levy, Princeton University	Freaks of Fortune: The Emerging World of Capitalism and Risk in America (Harvard University Press).
2014	Geraldo L. Cadava, Northwestern University	Standing on Common Ground: The Making of a Sunbelt Borderland (Harvard University Press).
2014 Honorable Mention	Dawn Bohulano Mabalon, San Francisco State University	Little Manila Is in the Heart: The Making of the Filipina/o American Community in Stockton, California (Duke University Press).
2015	Allyson Hobbs, Stanford University	A Chosen Exile: A History of Racial Passing in American Life (Harvard University Press).
2015 Honorable Mention	Jamie Cohen-Cole, George Washington University	The Open Mind: Cold War Politics and the Sciences of Human Nature (University of Chicago Press).
2015 Honorable Mention	Katherine C. Mooney, Florida State University	Race Horse Men: How Slavery and Freedom Were Made at the Racetrack (Harvard University Press).
2015 Honorable Mention	Kyle G. Volk, University of Montana	Moral Minorities and the Making of American Democracy (Oxford University Press).
2016	Mark G. Hanna, University of California, San Diego	Pirate Nests and the Rise of the British Empire, 1570-1740 (University of North Carolina Press for the Omohundro Institute of Early American History and Culture).
2016 Honorable Mention	Joshua L. Reid, University of Washington	The Sea is My Country: The Maritime World of the Makahs (Yale University Press).
2016 Honorable Mention	Andrew J. Torget, University of North Texas	Seeds of Empire: Cotton, Slavery, and the Transformation of the Texas Borderlands, 1800-1850 (University of North Carolina Press).
2017	Max Krochmal, Texas Christian University	Blue Texas: The Making of a Multiracial Democratic Coalition in the Civil Rights Era (University of North Carolina Press).
2018	Brian McCammack, Lake Forest College	Landscapes of Hope: Nature and the Great Migration in Chicago (Harvard University Press).
2018 Honorable Mention	Courtney Fullilove, Wesleyan University	The Profit of the Earth: The Global Seeds of American Agriculture (University of Chicago Press).
2018 Honorable Mention	Julilly Kohler-Hausmann, Cornell University	Getting Tough: Welfare and Imprisonment in 1970s America (Princeton University Press).
2019	Elizabeth Gillespie McRae, Western Carolina University	Mothers of Massive Resistance: White Women and the Politics of White Supremacy (Oxford University Press).
2019 Finalist	Jonathan Gienapp, Stanford University	The Second Creation: Fixing the American Constitution in the Founding Era (Harvard University Press).
2019 Finalist	Monica Muñoz Martinez, Brown University	The Injustice Never Leaves You: Anti-Mexican Violence in Texas (Harvard University Press).
2019 Finalist	Ana Raquel Minian, Stanford University	Undocumented Lives: The Untold Story of Mexican Migration (Harvard University Press).
2020	Vincent DiGirolamo, Baruch College	Crying the News: A History of America's Newsboys (Oxford University Press).
2021	Johanna Fernández, Baruch College	The Young Lords: A Radical History (University of North Carolina Press).
2022	Gabriel Winant, University of Chicago	The Next Shift: The Fall of Industry and the Rise of Health Care in Rust Belt America (Harvard University Press).
2023	Kathryn Olivarius, Stanford University	Necropolis: Disease, Power, and Capitalism in the Cotton Kingdom (Belknap Press of Harvard University Press)
2024	Michael A. Blaakman, Princeton University	Speculation Nation: Land Mania in the Revolutionary American Republic (University of Pennsylvania Press)
2026	Bench Ansfield, Temple University	Born in Flames: The Business of Arson and the Remaking of the American City (W. W. Norton & Company)

== See also ==
- List of history awards
