= Ross E. Paulson =

American historian (born 1935)

Ross Evans Paulson was an American historian. He was born in 1935 and died in 2011.

He taught at Augustana College from 1962 to 1995, and was professor emeritus. His papers are held at Augustana College Library.

== Awards ==
- 1967 Frederick Jackson Turner Award

== Works ==
- Radicalism and Reform: The Vrooman Family and American Social Thought, 1837-1937. University Press of Kentucky. 1968. ISBN 978-0-8131-1156-8.
- Women's suffrage and prohibition: a comparative study of equality and social control. Scott, Foresman. 1973. ISBN 978-0-673-05982-6.
- Language, Science, and Action: Korzybski's General Semantics ― A Study in Comparative Intellectual History, 1837-1937. Greenwood Press. 1983. ISBN 978-0-3132-3732-4.
- Liberty, equality, and justice: civil rights, women's rights, and the regulation of business, 1865-1932. Duke University Press. 1997. ISBN 978-0-8223-1991-7. "Ross Paulson."

=== Criticism ===
- "Review: The Myth of the Lost Cause", The American Historical Review
