= A Nation Under Our Feet =

2003 book by Steven Hahn

- Author: Steven Hahn
- Publisher: Belknap Press
- Publication date: November 10, 2003
- Pages: 624
- ISBN: 0-674-01169-4 (hardcover)

A Nation Under Our Feet: Black Political Struggles in the Rural South from Slavery to the Great Migration is a Pulitzer Prize–winning book written in 2003 by Steven Hahn. The book is a history of the changing nature of African-American political power in the United States spanning six decades from around the end of the American Civil War to the Great Migration, when more than a million African Americans left the Southern United States for the Northern United States between about 1915 and 1930. It received the 2004 Pulitzer Prize for History, the Bancroft Prize from Columbia University, and the Merle Curti Award in Social History from the Organization of American Historians.

== See also ==
- Civil rights movement (1865–1896)
