= Bruce Nelson (historian) =

American historian (1940–2022)

Professor Emeritus Bruce Nelson
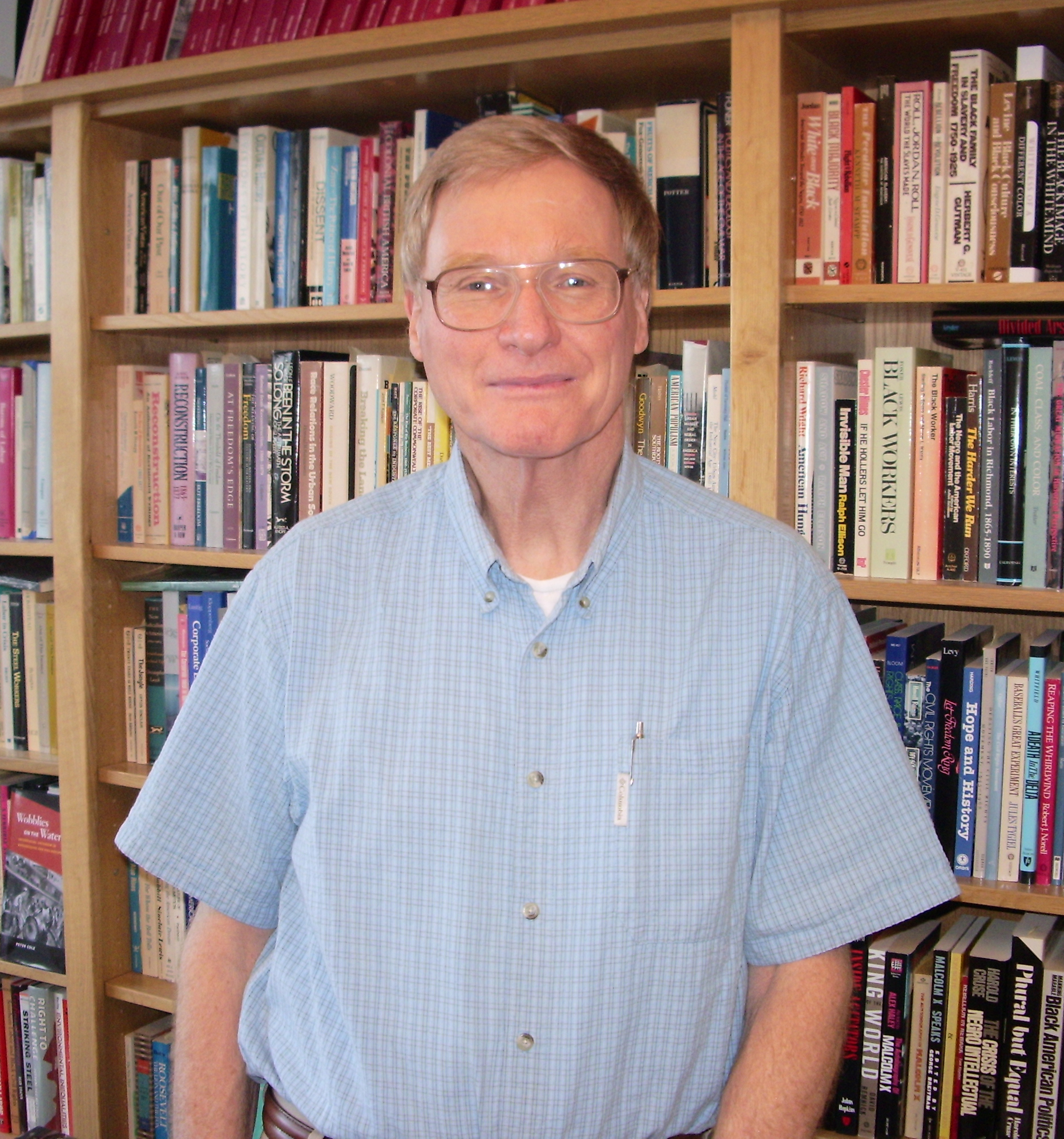
- Bruce Nelson (2007)
- Born: Joseph Bruce Nelson; August 9, 1940; Flushing, Queens, New York City
- Died: June 24, 2022 (aged 81); White River Junction, Vermont
- Citizenship: American
- Occupation: Professor of History
- Awards: Frederick Jackson Turner Award (1989), Guggenheim Fellowship (2002)

Academic background
- Education: Princeton University
- Alma mater: University of California, Berkeley

Academic work
- Discipline: United States History
- Sub-discipline: Labor History of the United States
- Institutions: Dartmouth College
- Notable works: Workers on the Waterfront (1988)

Joseph Bruce Nelson (1940-2022) was a professor emeritus of history at Dartmouth College and noted labor historian and scholar of the history of the concepts of race and class in the United States and among Western European immigrants to the U.S.

== Background ==
Joseph Bruce Nelson was born on August 9, 1940, in Flushing, Queens, New York City, and raised in Manahasset Bay, Long Island. He graduated from The Choate School (now Choate Rosemary Hall) in Wallingford, Connecticut and from Princeton University in 1962 with a degree in religion.

After graduation, Nelson moved to California, attended the San Francisco Theological Seminary, and received a master's degree in history from the University of California, Berkeley. In 1982, he received a PhD in History from Berkeley.

== Career ==
=== Labor ===
Between his MA and PhD, Nelson left academia for nine years to work as an auto worker, machine operator, warehouseman, and longshoreman.

=== Activism ===
Nelson participated in the Civil Rights Movement in the 1960s. In 1965, he went to jail in Selma, Alabama, just prior to the Selma to Montgomery marches.

=== Academia ===
Nelson taught at the University of California Davis, Middlebury College, and Dartmouth (1985-2009), where he became a full professor and retired professor emeritus after a quarter century there. Nelson continued to lecture to Dartmouth students, alumni, and interns. Students continue to cite him as influential.

== Personal life and death ==
In 1962, Nelson married Donna Robinson; they had two children.

Nelson was a member of the United Association for Labor Education and the Organization of American Historians, and the editorial board of Labor History.

Nelson played lacrosse in high school and college and founded the Oakland Youth Lacrosse team in Oakland, California.

Bruce Nelson died age 81 on June 24, 2022, in White River Junction, Vermont.

== Research ==
Nelson focused on the formation of the concepts of class, race and nationhood in the United States and Western Europe. Most of his published research examined these issues in the context of the American labor movement, particularly dock and steel workers' unions. Most recently, Nelson's work examined themes of race and class in the Irish American experience. His published works take a "new labor history" perspective.

Nelson's 1988 book, Workers on the Waterfront: Seamen, Longshoremen and Unionism in the 1930s, was widely praised as a breakthrough in the labor history of the influential West Coast dock workers' unions. The work, based on Nelson's doctoral dissertation, was praised as the "best analysis" of the 1934 West Coast Longshore Strike. It was cited as "an excellent example of the kind of research that is both needed and possible..." and for documenting "clearly and carefully the use of anti-communism as a subterfuge for anti-unionism." The book received the Frederick Jackson Turner Award from the Organization of American Historians (awarded to an author publishing his or her first book).

Nelson's second major work, Divided We Stand, expanded Nelson's interest in the formation of various concepts of "working class." The book focused again on longshoremen but expanded its scope to include workers in New York City, New Orleans and Los Angeles as well as steelworkers in the Midwest. The book was called "a landmark study of race and trade unionism":

Bruce Nelson, in line with David Roediger and others, argues that "the history of the white working class, in its majority, was one of self-definition in opposition to an often demonized racial Other [sic] and intense resistance to the quest of African Americans for full citizenship". What makes Divided We Stand unique is that, unlike heavily cultural whiteness studies that have used scant literary evidence to support sweeping theoretical claims, Nelson digs deeply into archival sources and oral interviews to describe real workers and their shop-floor experience in compelling detail.

In more recent years, Nelson turned his attention away from labor unions and toward Irish Americans as a means of examining shifting concepts of race and class.

== Awards and recognition ==
Awards:

- 1988: Distinguished Teaching Award from Dartmouth College
- 1989: Frederick Jackson Turner Award from the Organization of American Historians for Workers on the Waterfront
- 2009: Robert A. Fish 1918 Memorial Prize 2009 from Dartmouth College
- (Undated): Class of 1962 Faculty Fellowship

Nelson received fellowships from the John Simon Guggenheim Memorial Foundation (2002), Carter G. Woodson Institute at the University of Virginia, the National Endowment for the Humanities, and the Woodrow Wilson International Center for Scholars, as well as the Dartmouth Class of 1962 Faculty Fellowship for excellence in scholarship and teaching.

== Works ==
Aside from collaborative works, Nelson wrote himself:

Books:

- Irish Nationalists and the Making of the Irish Race (Princeton, N.J.: Princeton University Press, 2012) ISBN 9780691153124
- Divided We Stand: American Workers and the Struggle for Black Equality (Princeton: Princeton University Press, 2000) ISBN 0-691-01732-8
- Workers on the Waterfront: Seamen, Longshoremen and Unionism in the 1930s (Champaign, Ill.: University of Illinois Press, 1990) ISBN 0-252-01487-1

Book chapters:

- "'CIO Meant One Thing for the Whites and Another Thing for Us': Steelworkers and Civil Rights, 1936-1974." In Southern Labor in Transition, 1940-1995. Robert H. Zieger, ed. Knoxville, Tenn.: University of Tennessee Press, 1997. ISBN 0-87049-990-4
- "Class and Race in the Crescent City: The ILWU, from San Francisco to New Orleans." In The CIO's Left-Led Unions. Steven Rosswurm, ed. New Brunswick, N.J.: Rutgers University Press, 1992. ISBN 0-8135-1769-9
- "The 'Lords of the Docks' Reconsidered: Race Relations among West Coast Longshoremen, 1933-61." In Waterfront Workers: New Perspectives on Race and Class. Calvin Winslow, ed. Champaign, Ill.: University of Illinois Press, 1998. ISBN 0-252-02392-7

Articles:

- "Class, Race and Democracy in the CIO: The 'New' Labor History Meets the 'Wages of Whiteness'." International Review of Social History. 41 (1996).
- "Irish Americans, Irish Nationalism, and the 'Social' Question, 1916-1923." boundary 2. 31:1 (Spring 2004).
- "Organized Labor and the Struggle for Black Equality in Mobile during World War II." Journal of American History. 80:3 (December 1993).
- "The Triumph and 'Tragedy' of Walter Reuther." Reviews in American History. 24:3 (September 1996).
- "The Uneven Development of Class and Consciousness." Labor History. 32:4 (Fall 1991).
- "Working Class Agency and Racial Inequality." International Review of Social History. 41 (1996).
- "Zieger's CIO: In Defense of Labor Liberalism." Labor History. 37:2 (Spring 1996).
