= Memory Lands =

2018 book by Christine DeLucia

Memory Lands: King Philip's War and the Place of Violence in the Northeast
- Author: Christine M. DeLucia
- Subject: Indigenous history
- Published: 2018
- Media type: Print
- ISBN: 9780300201178

Memory Lands: King Philip's War and the Place of Violence is a 2018 book by Williams College history professor Christine DeLucia. The book was published by Yale University Press's Henry Roe Cloud Series on American Indians and Modernity. It looks at over three hundred years of Indigenous history from King Philip's War to the present day, mostly in the North American Northeast, as well as in Bermuda. The book focuses on the role of place and details the continued presence of Indigenous peoples and memory in Bastoniak (Boston), Narragansett (roughly overlapping with Rhode Island), along the middle of the Kwinitekw (Connecticut River) Valley, and Bermuda.

== Reception ==
Memory Lands has won numerous awards, including the 2019 Berkshire Conference of Women Historians Book Prize, the 2019 Peter J. Gomes Memorial Book Prize from the Massachusetts Historical Society, and the 2020 Lois P. Rudnick Prize from the New England American Studies Association. It also won an honorable mention from the National Council on Public History in 2019. The book has been discussed and reviewed widely, including with DeLucia in conversation with WBUR's Meghna Chakrabarti and by a group of scholars for H-Environment Roundtable Reviews.
