= Chester M. Morgan =

American historian

- Born: Chester M. Morgan III
- Education: University of Southern Mississippi (BA, MA); Memphis State University (PhD)
- Occupation: Historian
- Awards: Frederick Jackson Turner Award (1986)

Chester M. "Bo" Morgan III is an American historian.

== Life ==
He graduated from University of Southern Mississippi, with a BA and M.A. in 1974, and Memphis State University, with a Ph.D. in history in 1982. He was director of the oral history program and assistant professor of history at the University of Southern Mississippi.

He taught at Delta State University.

He returned to the University of Southern Mississippi in the fall of 2009 as Professor and University Historian, and is currently finishing a Centennial History of the university.

== Awards ==
- 1986 Frederick Jackson Turner Award, for Redneck Liberal

== Works ==
- Redneck Liberal: Theodore G. Bilbo and the New Deal. LSU Press. 1985. ISBN 978-0-8071-2432-1.
- Dearly bought, deeply treasured: the University of Southern Mississippi, 1912-1987. University Press of Mississippi. 1987. ISBN 978-0-87805-307-0.
- From Poverty to Promise: Mississippi 1917–1945, Mississippi Department of Archives and History
