= Rosalind Rosenberg =

American historian (born 1946)

- Born: 1946 (age 79–80)
- Education: Stanford University (BA, MA, PhD)

Rosalind Rosenberg (born 1946) is an American historian.

== Life ==
Rosenberg graduated from Stanford University, with a BA and Ph.D., in 1974. She began her teaching career at Columbia University in 1974 and taught at Wesleyan University in Connecticut from 1982 to 1984 before joining the faculty at Barnard College, where she became the Ann Whitney Olin Professor of History. At Barnard she has served as chair of the Women's Studies department, the American Studies program, and the History department, while contributing to the graduate program at Columbia University. She has been a member of the executive committee of the Society of American Historians.

As of 2018, she is professor emerita of History at Barnard College. Her papers are held at Radcliffe College.

She is married to Gerald Rosenberg; they have two sons, Clifford and Nicholas. She lives in New York City.

== E.E.O.C. vs Sears, Roebuck ==
In 1985, Rosenberg testified as an expert witness in a highly publicized case in which the Equal Employment Opportunity Commission (EEOC) had charged Sears Roebuck and Company with discrimination against their women employees. Rosenberg testified that the underrepresentation of women in Sears' sales force was "consistent with an absence of discrimination", due to differences in the career aspirations of men and women and other factors not attributable solely to Sears' business practices. In deciding the case in Sears' favor, Judge John A. Nordberg noted that Rosenberg's testimony helped him determine his verdict. This touched off a lengthy public debate that virtually isolated Professor Rosenberg from fellow feminists and historians, who accused her of turning her scholarship against the women's movement, with College of Staten Island professor Sandi Cooper terming Rosenberg's testimony an "immoral act" and fellow witness. Hofstra University professor Alice Kessler-Harris stating that: "You would not lie in your testimony, but you also would not say or write something as a historian solely to hurt a group of people. And the consequences of Rosalind's testimony can be interpreted that way." Within short order, numerous publications such as Radical History Review, New Directions for Women, The Chronicle of Higher Education and The Nation analyzed the case, and most were critical of Rosenberg's participation.

Rosenberg acknowledged that she was seen by many as "a kind of traitor to the cause", but justified her decision to testify with the statement: "Scholars must not subordinate their scholarship to their politics, even if their scholarship appears to be heading in a politically dangerous direction. If the scholars allow their politics to drive their scholarship, they will be left with bad scholarship and misguided public policy." She was supported by fellow history professor Carl Degler of Stanford University, who had previously declined to testify in the case, but who later called that decision "cowardly" and wrote: "Rosalind did the right thing. She agreed to look into an issue, she examined it and she testified. History is a discipline in which we try to uncover the truth as we understand it. It's possible to disagree on interpretation, but that's part of professional activity."

== Awards ==
- 1983 Frederick Jackson Turner Award
- 2018 PROSE Award for Excellence in Humanities

== Works ==
- Changing the Subject: How the Women of Columbia Shaped the Way We Think About Sex and Politics. New York: Columbia University Press. 2004. ISBN 978-0-231-12644-1.
- Divided Lives: American Women in the Twentieth Century. New York: Macmillan. 1992. ISBN 978-0-374-52347-3. (Revised Edition, Hill and Wang, 2008)
- Beyond Separate Spheres: Intellectual Roots of Modern Feminism. New Haven: Yale University Press. 1982. ISBN 978-0-300-03092-1. "Rosalind Rosenberg."
- Jane Crow: The Life of Pauli Murray. NY: Oxford University Press. 2017. ISBN 978-0190656454.

=== Chapters ===
- David Hollinger, ed. (2006). "Women in the Humanities: Taking Their Place". The Humanities and the Dynamics of Inclusion, 1945-2000. Baltimore, MD: The Johns Hopkins University Press. ISBN 978-0-8018-8390-3.
- William Theodore De Bary, ed. (2006). "Virginia Gildersleeve: Opening the Gates". Living Legacies at Columbia. New York: Columbia University Press. pp. 350–61. ISBN 978-0-231-13884-0.
- Theodore Porter and Dorothy Ross, ed. (2003). "Gender". The Modern Social Sciences. Vol. 7 of The Cambridge History of Science. New York: Cambridge University Press. pp. 678–692. ISBN 978-0-521-59442-4.
- "Conjunctions: Race and Gender in the Work of Pauli Murray". Journal of Women's History: 68–73. Summer 2002. ISSN 1042-7961.
- Susan Ware, ed. (1998). "Pauli Murray and the Killing of Jane Crow". Forgotten Heroes From America's Past. New York: Free Press. pp. 279–87. ISBN 978-0-684-84375-9.
- Richard Bulliet, ed. (1998). "The Woman Question". The Columbia History of the 20th Century. New York: Columbia University Press. pp. 53–80. ISBN 978-0-231-07629-6.
- G. J. Barker-Benfield; Catherine Clinton, eds. (1998). "Margaret Mead". Portraits of American women: from settlement to the present. Oxford University Press. p. 507. ISBN 978-0-19-512048-6. "Rosalind Rosenberg."
