= Nancy Stepan =

Scottish-American science historian

Nancy Leys Stepan is a professor emeritus of history at Columbia University, previously a Senior Research Fellow with the Wellcome Trust Unit at the University of Oxford, where she was awarded the Distinction of Professor of Modern History. Her research focuses on the history of science in Latin America and the importance of scientific research in the tropics.

== Education ==
Stepan studied at Somerville College, Oxford and earned a Ph.D. from the University of California in 1971.

== Career ==
In 1976 Stepan published her first book, Beginnings of Brazilian Science, examining the work of the Brazilian public health scientist Oswaldo Cruz and his contributions to the country's institutions in the closing years of the 19th century and beginning of the 20th. Its publication occurred during Ernesto Geisel's redemocratization of Brazil and was influential then. In the following decades it was seminal in shaping the historiography of science in Brazil, and in political and academic debate in both Brazil and Spanish America around science and scientific institutions in developing countries.

Stepan's second book, The Idea of Race in Science (1982), addressed the issue of race science in early British scientific research and how it influenced later development of scientific methodologies. A central thesis of the book concerns "dubious, culturally ridden science"; it discusses both the pervasive role of pseudoscience in early application of scientific method and how it combined with ideas of race; it argues that the combination ultimately led to bigoted beliefs becoming established in the scientific community thanks to racist claims made by major names in science such as Charles Darwin.

Continuing her research into Latin American history, Stepan published "The Hour of Eugenics" in 1991, investigating the history of eugenics in the region from the 1880s to just after World War II. The book particularly noted a cultural shift, with early proponents declaring the importance of evolution and of preventing moral degeneration of civilization, but largely restricted to the academic sphere with limited political impingement. After World War I, eugenics expanded in Latin America to active organizations, and conferences promoting the ideas, until the aftermath of World War II, when public knowledge of the actions of Nazi Germany resulted in the collapse of the subject in the region. Stepan also notes that Latin American discussion of eugenics differed significantly from its counterparts in North America and Europe, with their concerns about race. The original Latin American populations comprised non-white racial groups, and Latin American eugenics focused on Neo-Lamarckian claims, arguing for racial improvement within their own communities.

Stepan's research articles took discussion of each book's overall themes into new avenues, with major impact on the development of the history of science in Latin America, particularly for members of the Latin American Studies Association. In the decades since, this scholarship has been shaped by her writings on what constituted national and transatlantic science, and on how Latin America affected the broader scientific community in ways not previously considered. Her work has also shaped greater research into other less studied regions of the world, particularly in postcolonial countries; it has also placed feminist studies at the forefront through her consideration of the impact of female scientists in Latin America.

== Organizations ==
Stepan is a member of the History of Science Society and served as its Local Arrangements Chairwoman in the 1970s.

== Awards and honors ==
Stepan was made a Guggenheim Fellow in 1986 for her research on Iberian and Latin American history, and was awarded the Oxford title of Professor of Modern History in 1998.

== Bibliography ==
- — (1976). Beginnings of Brazilian Science: Oswaldo Cruz, Medical Research and Policy, 1890–1920. Science History Publications. p. 225. ISBN 9780882020327.
- — (1982). The Idea of Race in Science: Great Britain, 1800–1960. Palgrave Macmillan UK. p. 230. ISBN 9781349054527.
- — (1991). "The Hour of Eugenics": Race, Gender, and Nation in Latin America. Cornell University Press. p. 248. ISBN 9781501702259.
- — (2001). Picturing Tropical Nature. Cornell University Press. p. 283. ISBN 9781861891464.
- — (2011). Eradication: Ridding the World of Diseases Forever?. Reaktion Books. p. 312. ISBN 9781861898616.
