= David Sehat =

American academic

- Occupation: Historian
- Employer: Georgia State University

David Sehat is an American academic and a professor of American intellectual and cultural history at Georgia State University. He was the 2017-18 John G. Winant Visiting Professor of American Government at the Rothermere American Institute and Balliol College, Oxford. He is the author of three books. He won the Organization of American Historians's 2012 Frederick Jackson Turner Award for The Myth of American Religious Freedom.

== Works ==
- Sehat, David. (2007) "The civilizing mission of Booker T. Washington." The Journal of Southern History 73.2 (2007): 323-362. online
- Sehat, David. (2007) "The American moral establishment: Religion and liberalism in the nineteenth century'" (PhD dissertation, The University of North Carolina at Chapel Hill, 2007) online
- Sehat, David. (2008) "Gender and Theatrical Realism: The Problem of Clyde Fitch" The Journal of the Gilded Age and Progressive Era 7.3 (2008): 325-352.
- Sehat, David (2011). The Myth of American Religious Freedom. New York: Oxford University Press. ISBN 9780190247218. OCLC 925843779.
- Sehat, David (2015). The Jefferson Rule: How the Founding Fathers Became Infallible and Our Politics Inflexible. New York: Simon & Schuster. ISBN 9781476779782. OCLC 913337448.
- Sehat, David. "Thomas Jefferson and Us." The William and Mary Quarterly 74.4 (2017): 771-776.
- Sehat, David. (2020) "Political atheism: the secularization and liberalization of American public life." Modern Intellectual History 17.1 (2020): 249-277. online
- Sehat, David (2022). This Earthly Frame: The Making of American Secularism. New Haven: Yale University Press. ISBN 9780300265620. OCLC 1291318008. online
