= Christopher F. Clark =

British-American historian

- Born: 1953 (age 72–73); United Kingdom
- Education: University of Warwick; Harvard University
- Occupations: Historian, educator

Christopher F. Clark (born 1953) is a British-American historian.

== Life ==
He grew up in the London area and graduated from the University of Warwick, and Harvard University, with a PhD in history.

Clark taught at the University of York for eighteen years, and at the University of Warwick for another seven years. He has taught at the University of Connecticut since 2005.

== Work ==
Clark specialises in 18th and 19th century North American and United States social and cultural history; the social history of economic life; the history of American capitalism; rural societies and industrialisation; abolitionism and utopian communities; and New England. His current research interests include Ideas about rural society and land reform in the U.S. and overseas, c. 1750-1960.

== Awards ==
- 1991 Frederick Jackson Turner Award

== Works ==
- "Household Economy, Market Exchange and the Rise of Capitalism in the Connecticut Valley, 1800–1860," Journal of Social History 13 (1979–80): 169–189.
- The Roots of Rural Capitalism: Western Massachusetts, 1780-1860. Cornell University Press. 1992. ISBN 978-0-8014-9693-6.
- The communitarian moment: the radical challenge of the Northampton Association. University of Massachusetts Press. 2003. ISBN 978-1-55849-416-9.
- Social change in America: from the Revolution through the Civil War. Ivan R. Dee. 2006. ISBN 978-1-56663-686-5.
- Clark, Christopher (Fall 2010). "A Wealth of Notions: Interpreting Economy and Morality in Early America". Early American Studies. 8 (3): 672–683. doi:10.1353/eam.2010.0003. JSTOR 23546663. S2CID 145436516.

=== Editor ===
- Christopher Clark; Nancy Hewitt; Joshua Brown; David Jaffee, eds. (2007). Who Built America? Volume 1: To 1877; Working People and the Nation's History. Macmillan. ISBN 978-0-312-44691-8.
- Christopher Clark; Roy Rosenzweig, eds. (2000). Who built America ?: working people and the nation's economy, politics, culture, and society. Worth Publishers. ISBN 978-1-57259-302-2.
- Christopher Clark; Kerry Wayne Buckley, eds. (2004). Letters from an American utopia: the Stetson family and the Northampton Association, 1843-1847. University of Massachusetts Press. ISBN 978-1-55849-431-2.
- Christopher Clark, ed. (1988). The Diary of an Apprentice Cabinetmaker: Edward Jenner Carpenter's Journal, 1844-1845. Books on Demand. ISBN 978-0-7837-2021-0.
