= Mae Ngai =

American historian

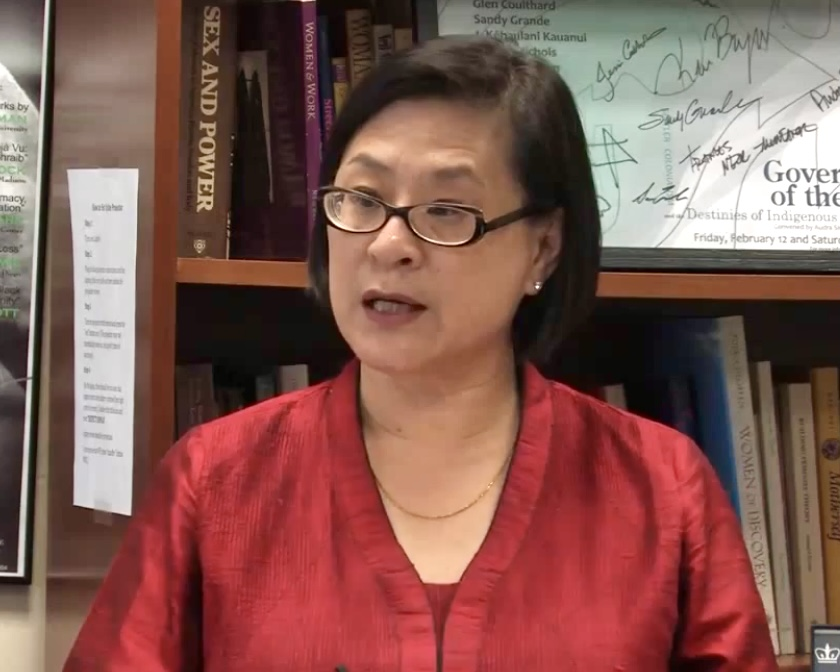
- Ngai speaking in 2012
- Born: New York City, U.S.
- Occupations: Historian; author; professor
- Awards: Bancroft Prize, 2022; Frederick Jackson Turner Award

Academic background
- Education: Empire State College (BA); Columbia University (MA, PhD)
- Doctoral advisor: Eric Foner

Academic work
- Institutions: Columbia University; University of Chicago
- Main interests: American history
- Notable works: Impossible Subjects (2004)

Chinese name
- Traditional Chinese: 艾明如
Transcriptions
Standard Mandarin
- Hanyu Pinyin: Ài Míngrú
Yue: Cantonese
- Jyutping: Ngaai^{6} Ming^{4} Jyu^{4}

Mae Ngai (Chinese: 艾明如; pinyin: Ài Míngrú) is an American historian who is the Lung Family Professor of Asian American Studies and Professor of History at Columbia University. Her work focuses on nationalism, citizenship, ethnicity, immigration, and race in 20th-century United States history.

== Early life and education ==
Ngai was born in The Bronx, New York City, to a Taiwanese American family. Her parents were Taiwanese waishengren that had fled mainland China for Taiwan during the Great Retreat in 1949. Her maternal grandfather was a Kuomintang official.

Ngai took a break from her schooling in 1972 to work as a community activist. After working in the Education and Political Action Department and the Consortium for Worker Education as a researcher and professional labor educator in an environment "where being Chinese and being American existed in tension, but not in contradiction," Ngai decided to pursue graduate school focusing on immigration studies.

Ngai earned a Bachelor of Arts (B.A.) from Empire State College in 1992, then a Master of Arts (1993) and Ph.D. (1998) from Columbia University, where she wrote her dissertation under Eric Foner.

== Academic career ==
After graduation, Ngai obtained postdoctoral fellowships from the Social Science Research Council, the New York University School of Law, and, in 2003, the Radcliffe Institute. She taught at the University of Chicago as an assistant and then associate professor before returning to Columbia as a full professor in 2006. From 2018 to 2019, Ngai served as the Wayne Morse Chair of Law and Politics, established in honor of the late former Senator, at the University of Oregon. She focused on immigration, citizenship, and nationalism, whose problems she is especially interested in as they are produced historically in law and society, in processes of transnational migration, and in the formation of ethno-racial communities.

In addition to publishing in numerous academic journals, Ngai has written on immigration and related policy for the Washington Post, the New York Times, the Los Angeles Times, The Nation, and the Boston Review.

Ngai's most notable work was Impossible Subjects: Illegal Aliens and the Making of Modern America, which discusses the creation of the legal category of an "illegal alien" in the early 20th century and its social and historical consequences and context.

=== Courses taught ===
- Immigrants in American History and Life, Lecture
- Colonization/Decolonization, Undergraduate Seminar
- Transnational Migration and Citizenship, Graduate & Undergraduate Seminar
- Historiography for PhD students

== Awards and honors ==
- Fellow of the American Academy of Arts and Sciences, 2022
- Bancroft Prize, 2022
- Shelby Collum Davis for Historical Studies, Princeton University, Spring 2018
- Kluge Chair in Countries and Cultures of the North, Library of Congress, Fall 2017
- Huntington Library, Spring 2017
- Woodrow Wilson International Center for Scholars, 2013
- OAH-AHRAC China Residency Program, 2013
- Chiang Ching-Kuo Foundation for International Scholarly Exchange, 2012
- Cullman Center for Scholars and Writers, New York Public Library, 2012
- Institute for Advanced Study, 2009
- John Simon Guggenheim Memorial Foundation, 2009
- Huntington Library, 2006
- Frederick Jackson Turner Award, Organization of American Historians for Impossible Subjects: Illegal Aliens and the Making of Modern America, 2005
- Theodore Saloutos Book Award, the Immigration and Ethnic History Society, 2004
- Littleton-Griswold Prize, the American Historical Association, 2004
- Radcliffe Institute for Advanced Study, Harvard, 2003
- NYU Law School, 2000
- Social Science Research Council, 1999

== Publications ==
=== Articles ===
- Ron DeSantis 'Banned China From Buying Land in the State of Florida.' How Did We Get Here?" The New York Times, December 11, 2023
- "The Architecture of Race in American Immigration Law", The Journal of American History, June 1999, Vol. 86 No. 1
- "The Strange Career of the Illegal Alien", Law and History Review, Spring 2003, Vol. 21 No. 1
- Impossible Subjects: Illegal Aliens and the Making of Modern America (Princeton UP, 2004; 2nd ed. 2014) excerpt
- "Birthright citizenship and the alien citizen." Fordham Law Review (2006): 2521+ online.
- " 'A Slight Knowledge of the Barbarian Language': Chinese Interpreters in Late-Nineteenth and Early-Twentieth-Century America." Journal of American Ethnic History 30.2 (2011): 5–32. online
- The Lucky Ones: One Family and the Extraordinary Invention of Chinese America Princeton University Press, 2012).
- "Chinese gold miners and the “Chinese question” in nineteenth-century California and Victoria." Journal of American History 101.4 (2015): 1082-1105.
- The Chinese Question: The Gold Rushes and Global Politics (WW Norton, 2021) excerpt
- Ngai, Mae (September–October 2006). "The Lost Immigration Debate". Boston Review.
- Ngai, Mae M. (May 16, 2006). "How grandma got legal". The Los Angeles Times.
- Mae M. Ngai (June 14, 2005). "We Need a Deportation Deadline". The Washington Post.
- Ngai, Mae (January 28, 2018). "Immigration Border-Enforcement Myth". The New York Times.

== Sources ==
- Impossible Subjects: Illegal Aliens and the Making of Modern America, Princeton University Press, (2004) ISBN 978-0-691-07471-9
- Ronald H. Bayor, ed. (2004). "Race, Nation, and Citizenship in Late Nineteenth Century America". The Columbia documentary history of race and ethnicity in America. Columbia University Press. ISBN 978-0-231-11994-8.
- Janice A. Radway; Kevin Gaines; Barry Shank; Penny Von Eschen, eds. (2009). "The Johnson-Reed Act of 1924 and the Reconstruction of Race in Immigration Law". American Studies: An Anthology. John Wiley and Sons. ISBN 978-1-4051-1351-9.
- Marc S. Rodriguez, ed. (2004). "Braceros, "Wetbacks", and the National Boundaries of Class". Repositioning North American migration history: new directions in modern continental migration, citizenship, and community. Boydell & Brewer. ISBN 978-1-58046-158-0.
- The Lucky Ones: One Family and the Extraordinary Invention of Chinese America. Houghton Mifflin Harcourt. 2010. ISBN 978-0-618-65116-0.
