= Barton C. Shaw =

American historian

- Education: Emory University (PhD)
- Occupations: Historian; professor
- Awards: Frederick Jackson Turner Award (1985)

Barton C. Shaw is an American historian and professor emeritus at Cedar Crest College in Allentown, Pennsylvania.

He graduated from Emory University with a Ph.D.

== Awards ==
- 1985 Frederick Jackson Turner Award
- Ford Foundation Fellow
- Fulbright Senior Lecturer in American Studies at the University of Sheffield

== Works ==
- The wool-hat boys: a history of the Populist Party in Georgia, 1892 to 1910. Emory University. 1979.
- The wool-hat boys: a history of the Populist Party in Georgia, 1892 to 1910. Baton Rouge: Louisiana State University Press. 1984. ISBN 978-0-8071-1148-2. (ACLS History E-Book Project, 2005)

=== Editor ===
- Paul A. Cimbala; Barton C. Shaw, eds. (2007-08-19). Making a New South: Race, Leadership, and Community after the Civil War. University Press of Florida. ISBN 978-0-8130-3067-8.

=== Anthologies ===
- Christopher C. Meyers, ed. (2008). "The Populist Party in Georgia". The Empire State of the South: Georgia History in Documents and Essays. Mercer University Press. ISBN 978-0-88146-111-4.
