= Rozetta Township, Henderson County, Illinois =

Rozetta Township
- Township
- Location in Henderson County

- Henderson County's location in Illinois
- Coordinates: 40°56′25″N 90°50′33″W
- Country: United States
- State: Illinois
- County: Henderson
- Established: November 6, 1906

Area
  - Total: 36.35 sq mi (94.1 km^{2})
  - Land: 36.34 sq mi (94.1 km^{2})
  - Water: 0.01 sq mi (0.026 km^{2}) 0.02%
- Elevation: 720 ft (220 m)

Population (2020)
  - Total: 263
  - Density: 7.24/sq mi (2.79/km^{2})
- Time zone: UTC-6 (CST)
  - Summer (DST): UTC-5 (CDT)
- ZIP codes: 61418, 61447, 61453, 61462, 61469
- FIPS code: 17-071-66222

Rozetta Township is one of eleven townships in Henderson County, Illinois, USA. As of the 2020 census, its population was 263 and it contained 114 housing units. Early maps of Henderson County show this as Greenville Township, with "Rosetta" being the only post office. Local newspapers first mention Rozetta Township in 1892 but continued to mention Greenville Township until 1907.

== Geography ==
According to the 2021 census gazetteer files, Rozetta Township has a total area of 36.35 square miles (94.15 km^{2}), of which 36.34 square miles (94.12 km^{2}) (or 99.98%) is land and 0.01 square miles (0.03 km^{2}) (or 0.02%) is water.

=== Unincorporated towns ===
- Reeds at 40.917260°N 90.825417°W
- Rozetta at 40.941704°N 90.863751°W

(This list is based on USGS data and may include former settlements.)

=== Cemeteries ===
The township contains these six cemeteries: Coghill, Cumberland, Reed, Rozetta, Smith Creek and Stockton.

=== Major highways ===
- Illinois Route 164

=== Airports and landing strips ===
- Carner Landing Strip (currently unusable)

== Demographics ==
As of the 2020 census there were 263 people, 64 households, and 57 families residing in the township. The population density was 7.24 inhabitants per square mile (2.80/km^{2}). There were 114 housing units at an average density of 3.14 per square mile (1.21/km^{2}). The racial makeup of the township was 97.34% White, 0.00% African American, 0.38% Native American, 0.00% Asian, 0.38% Pacific Islander, 0.00% from other races, and 1.90% from two or more races. Hispanic or Latino of any race were 0.00% of the population.

There were 64 households, out of which 54.70% had children under the age of 18 living with them, 89.06% were married couples living together, none had a female householder with no spouse present, and 10.94% were non-families. 10.90% of all households were made up of individuals, and 10.90% had someone living alone who was 65 years of age or older. The average household size was 2.55 and the average family size was 2.74.

The township's age distribution consisted of 19.6% under the age of 18, 4.3% from 18 to 24, 1.8% from 25 to 44, 63.8% from 45 to 64, and 10.4% who were 65 years of age or older. The median age was 48.0 years. For every 100 females, there were 143.3 males. For every 100 females age 18 and over, there were 95.5 males.

Males had a median income of $56,667 versus $26,406 for females. The per capita income for the township was $83,681.

Historical population
Census	Pop.	Note	%±
2000	280		—
2010	271		−3.2%
2020	263		−3.0%
U.S. Decennial Census

== School districts ==
- United Community School District 304
- West Central Community Unit School District 235

== Political districts ==
- Illinois's 17th congressional district
- State House District 94
- State Senate District 47
