= Social Endeavor for Health and Telemedicine =

Indian telemedicine health initiative

Social Endeavor for Health and Telemedicine (SEHAT) is a telemedicine health initiative in India launched on 25 August 2015 by Ravi Shankar Prasad, Minister of Communications and Information Technology and Minister of Law and Justice, Govt. of India in the collaboration with Apollo Hospitals. In India the first telemedicine center was launched in the year 2000 and was inaugurated by the President of the United States, Bill Clinton.

== Overview ==
SEHAT initiative was launched with the motive to offer telemedicine center in rural areas of India where the people in rural areas can consult doctors online and also order generic drugs. Under the scheme Common Service Centers (CSC) with the support of Apollo and Medanta Hospital telemedicine services was already being offered in many areas. Now with the launch of SEHAT health initiative Common Service Centers (CSC) will be extended to 60,000 centers in different cities of India.
