= Max Krochmal =

American historian

- Education: University of California, Santa Cruz; Duke University
- Occupation: Historian
- Employer: LSU New Orleans
- Notable work: Blue Texas: The Making of a Multiracial Democratic Coalition in the Civil Rights Era
- Awards: Frederick Jackson Turner Award (2017)

Max Krochmal is an American historian. He is a professor of U.S. History and the Director of Justice Studies at LSU New Orleans. He was an associate professor of history at Texas Christian University.

He won the Organization of American Historians's Frederick Jackson Turner Award in 2017 for Blue Texas: The Making of a Multiracial Democratic Coalition in the Civil Rights Era.
