= Leslie Brown (historian) =

American historian

- Born: 1954; New York City, new York, U.S.
- Died: 2016 (aged 61–62); Boston, Massachusetts, U.S.

Academic background
- Education: Duke University; Tufts University

Academic work
- Discipline: History
- Institutions: Duke University; Skidmore College; Washington University in St. Louis; Williams College

Leslie Brown (1954 – August 5, 2016) was an American historian.

== Life ==
Leslie Brown was born in New York City and grew up in Albany, New York. She graduated from Albany High School in 1973. In 1977 she earned a B.A. in sociology from Tufts University and later went to Duke University, where she earned an A. M. and Ph.D in History in 1997. Following her graduation from Tufts, she was a bartender, managed stores for CVS and McDonalds, drove trucks for Ryder, and worked at Skidmore College in the Admissions Office and as director of the Higher Education Opportunity Program. In 1990 she moved to Durham, NC, for graduate school. From 1990 to 1995, while a graduate student at Duke University, she co-coordinated "Behind the Veil: Documenting African American Life in the Jim Crow South", a project based at the Center for Documentary Studies at Duke. As part of that project, Brown conducted oral history interviews in North Carolina, and helped facilitate the collection of more than 1,200 oral history interviews with African American southerners throughout the region. Interviews she conducted as part of her M.A. thesis and dissertation also became part of the "Behind the Veil" archive at Duke University's Special Collections Library.

Brown's teaching and scholarship focused on the history of African American communities in post-Civil War America, particularly the experiences of women and workers. Her first book, Upbuilding Black Durham (UNC Press, 2008), was awarded the Frederick Jackson Turner prize, issued by the Organization of American Historians. In 2010, she published, with Anne M. Valk, Living with Jim Crow: African American Women and Memories of the Segregated South (Palgrave, 2010), based on interviews from the 'Behind the Veil Project.' It was awarded the annual book prize from the Oral History Association in 2011. She also published numerous articles and, at the time of her death, was working on a monograph on African-American women and migration, and a compilation of writing and speeches by Shirley Chisholm. A collection of essays, edited by Brown, with Jacqueline Castledine and Anne Valk, U.S. Women's History: Untangling the Threads of Sisterhood, appeared shortly after Brown's death.

Brown was a dedicated teacher and mentor to many students, especially LGBTQ+ and students of color, for whom she advocated tirelessly. She has taught at Duke University, Skidmore College, and University of Missouri–St. Louis. She was an assistant professor at Washington University in St. Louis until she was denied tenure in 2007, before going to Williams College where she taught from 2008 until her death in 2016.

She died in Boston of T-cell lymphoma/leukemia, aged 61. At the time of her death, she lived in North Adams, Massachusetts, with her partner, Anne Valk.

== Awards ==
- 2009 Frederick Jackson Turner Award
- 2011 Oral History Association Book Prize

== Works ==
- Upbuilding Black Durham: Gender, Class, and Black Community Development in the Urban South. Chapel Hill: University of North Carolina Press. 2008. ISBN 978-0-8078-5835-6.
