= Les Brown (journalist) =

American journalist

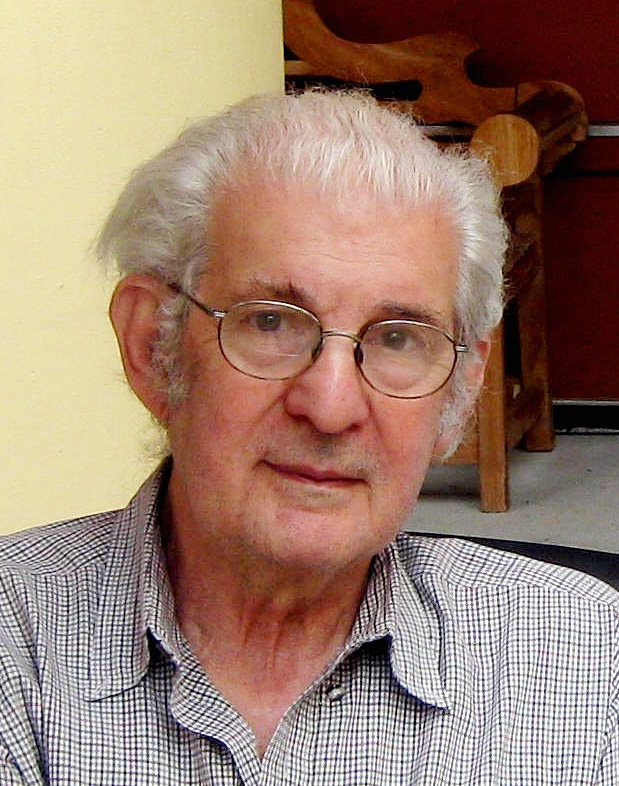
- Born: Lester Louis Brown; 20 December 1928; Indiana Harbor, East Chicago, IN
- Died: 4 November 2013 (age 84); Larchmont, NY
- Occupations: Journalist, publisher
- Known for: Pioneer reporter on the business of television
- Spouse: Jean Brown (Slaymaker)
- Children: Jessica Brown, Joshua Brown, Rebecca Brown Adelman
- Parent(s): Irving Brown and Helen Feigenbaum
- Relatives: Marion Brown Raisman, Anita Brown Duxler

Academic background
- Education: B.A. English (1950)
- Alma mater: Roosevelt University

Lester Louis Brown (20 December 1928 - 4 November 2013) was an American "pioneer in television journalism". He was also a publisher and book author, with topics reporting on the business of television. He founded a magazine called Channels of Communications in 1981.

== Family and childhood ==
=== Early life ===
Brown was born in Indiana Harbor, East Chicago, Indiana, on 20 December 1928. He was a first generation American of Polish-German Jewish descent. His parents, Irving H. Brown and Helen Feigenbaum, migrated to the United States shortly before the First World War. His father ran a store and Brown grew up with his sisters, Marion and Anita. He was the first of his family to attend college, graduating from Roosevelt University.

=== Family ===
He met Jean Rosalie Slaymaker when she was working at the Chicago Sun Times. They had their first child, Jessica, in 1960. He moved the family in 1965 to settle in Larchmont, New York, where they had two more children, Joshua and Rebecca.

== Journalism ==
His journalism career began in the Army, writing a newsletter for his post. Returning to Chicago, he joined the show-business newspaper Variety. In 1965, he transferred to New York to become Variety's TV/radio editor. Passed over when the Variety editor Abel Green died in 1973, Brown joined the New York Times as radio/television editor. During his career, he covered television events such as Watergate.

== Books ==
His book in 1971, Televi$ion: The Business Behind the Box, "was pioneering in its depiction about how the TV industry actually did and didn't work."

Les Brown's Encyclopedia of Television (1982) was an expanded edition of The New York Times Encyclopedia of Television, published in 1977. It later underwent many revisions, with a 3rd edition published in 1992 by Gale Research.

Keeping Your Eye on Television. 1979. Pilgrim Press ISBN 9780829803761

Fast Forward: The New Television and American Society, with Savannah Waring Walker. 1983. Andrews McMeel Publications, ISBN 9780836262087

Electric Media, by Les Brown and Sema Marks, was one of six books in the "Making Contact" series published by Harcourt Brace. It covers two technologies then overtaking the US: television (Brown) and computers (Marks). ISBN 0-15-318734-4

== Publishing ==
During a strike at The New York Times in 1981, Brown founded Channels of Communication as a non-profit venture funded by the Markle Foundation. Channels was later acquired by Norman Lear. Brown left in 1987 and Channels folded in 1990.

Brown launched a trade magazine, Television Business International, in 1988. It was also owned by Norman Lear's Act III Publishing. He was editor until 1992, then a columnist.

== Music ==
Brown opened the Gate of Horn, a 100-seat folk music club in Chicago in 1956 with his college classmate Albert Grossman. Grossman later managed Bob Dylan, Janis Joplin and The Band. The Gate of Horn hosted Roger McGuinn, Odetta, Lenny Bruce and Bill Cosby, among other future stars.

During those days, Brown wrote the lyrics to the song "Abilene". Set to music by John D. Loudermilk, it was first recorded by Bob Gibson. A cover version by George Hamilton IV reached number one on the country music chart for four weeks. "Abilene" is a country standard, and the name of one of Brown's granddaughters.

== Social issues ==
Ten years before the birth of social media, Brown warned about the dangers to democracy as sources of news and commentary proliferated.

Brown frequently wrote on subjects of regulation.
