= Alexander Keyssar =

American historian and professor (born 1947)

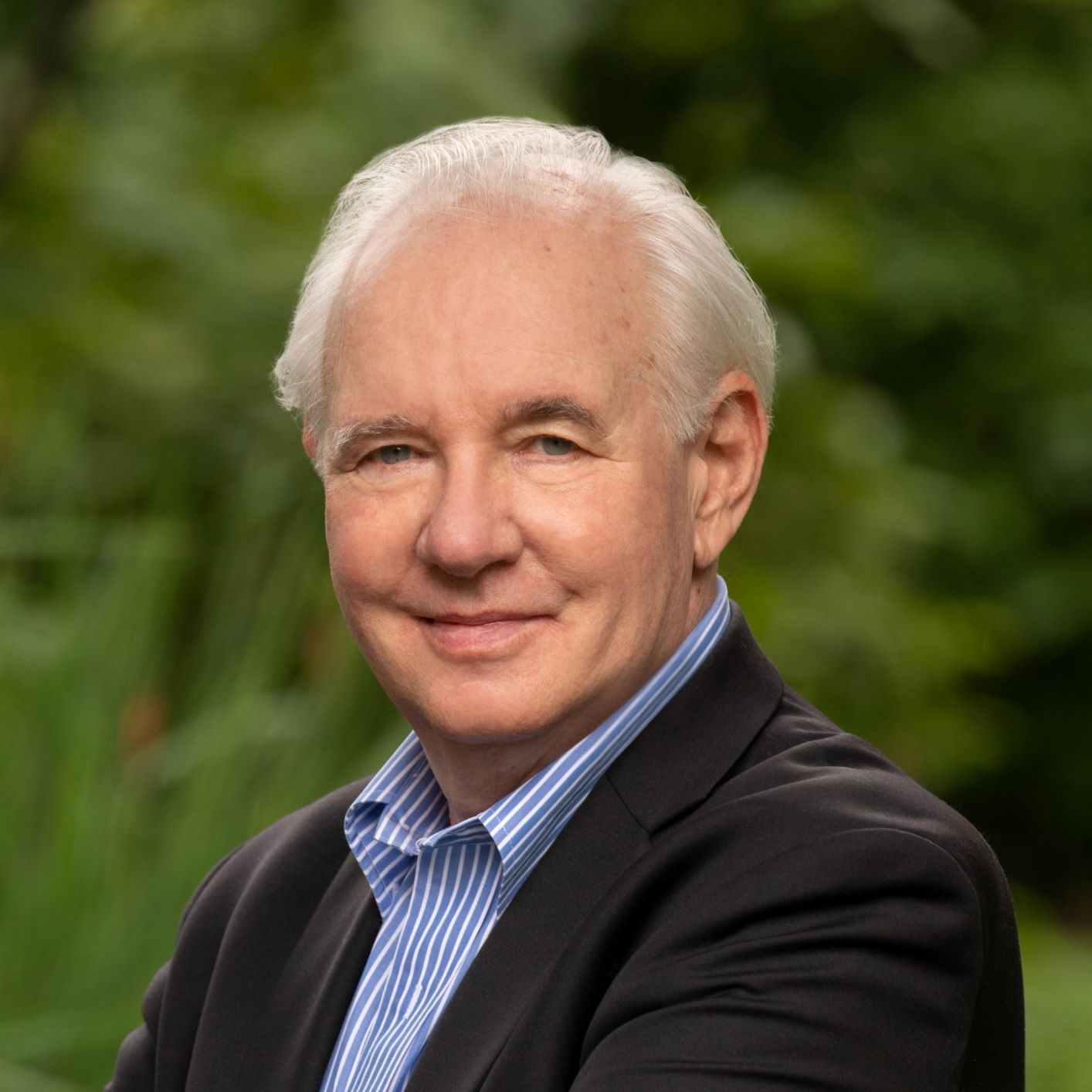
- Keyssar in 2020
- Born: May 13, 1947 (age 79)
- Education: Harvard College; Harvard University (PhD)
- Occupations: Historian; professor
- Awards: Frederick Jackson Turner Award (1987)

Alexander Keyssar (born May 13, 1947) is an American historian and the Matthew W. Stirling Jr. Professor of History and Social Policy at the Kennedy School of Government at Harvard University.

== Life ==
Alex graduated summa cum laude with a degree in English Literature from Harvard College in 1969. In 1977 he graduated from Harvard University with a PhD in the History of American Civilization. He taught at Brandeis University, Duke University, and Massachusetts Institute of Technology.

== Awards ==
- 1987 Frederick Jackson Turner Award; Philip Taft Labor History Prize for Out of Work
- 2001 Beveridge Prize for The Right to Vote; Eugene Genovese Prize for The Right to Vote
- 2001 Pulitzer Prize finalist for The Right to Vote: The Contested History of Democracy in the United States
- 2001 Los Angeles Times Book Award finalist for The Right to Vote: The Contested History of Democracy in the United States
- 2001 Parkman Prize, Finalist
- 2005 Fulbright Specialists University of Lisbon

== Works ==
- Why Do We Still Have the Electoral College?. Harvard University Press. 2020. ISBN 978-0-674-66015-1.
- Alexander Keyssar. (2001). The Right to Vote: The Contested History of Democracy in the United States. Basic Books. ISBN 978-0-465-02969-3. (2000) revised 2009
- Inventing America: A History of the United States. W.W. Norton. 2003. ISBN 978-0-393-97435-5.
- Alexander Keyssar. (1986). Out of Work: The First Century of Unemployment in Massachusetts. Cambridge University Press. ISBN 978-0-521-29767-7.
- Alexander Keyssar. (1969). Melville's Israel Potter: reflections on the American dream. Harvard University Press. ISBN 978-0-674-56475-6.
- "The Electoral College Flunks", The New York Review of Books, Volume 52, Number 5 · March 24, 2005
- Keyssar, Alexander (October 17, 2004). "Peculiar institution". The Boston Globe. Archived from the original on October 19, 2004.

=== Anthologies ===
- Sondra Myers, ed. (2002). "The Project of Democracy". The democracy reader. IDEA. ISBN 978-0-9702130-3-7.
- Jack N. Rakove, ed. (2002). "The Right to Vote and Election 2000". The Unfinished Election Of 2000: Leading Scholars Examine America's Strangest Election. Basic Books. ISBN 978-0-465-06838-8.

=== Co-author ===
- Alex Roland; W. Jeffrey Bolster; Alexander Keyssar (2008). The Way of the Ship: America's Maritime History Reenvisioned, 1600-2000. John Wiley and Sons. ISBN 978-0-470-13600-3.
- Inventing America, a text integrating the history of technology and science into the mainstream of American history
- Comparative and International Working-Class History. In 2004/5
