= Berkshire Conference of Women Historians =

The Berkshire Conference of Women Historians (also known as the "Little Berks") is an organization for female historians. The Conference welcomes women historians from all fields and historical eras, not just the history of women and gender. The Berkshire Conference is best known for its triennial meeting of the Berkshire Conference on the History of Women, or “Big Berks.”

== History ==
The Berkshire Conference of Women Historians was founded in 1930 by historians Louise Fargo Brown of Vassar College and Louise Ropes Loomis of Wells College in response to the marginalization women historians faced in the male-dominated historical profession. Because of gender discrimination in the profession at large, there were very few women with PhDs in history and most were concentrated at women's colleges. Women were underrepresented at the meetings of the American Historical Association (AHA), the professional organization for historians in the United States, and felt unwelcome at networking social events such as "smokers" and informal weekend retreats. In 1929, these three women historians decided after returning from the AHA meeting that women historians needed the supportive atmosphere of their own informal gatherings. These yearly events started as a series of spring weekend retreats, often in the Berkshire Mountains of New England. Initially called the Lakeville History Group, in 1935 the name changed to the BCWH since most of the meetings took place in Stockbridge, Massachusetts. By 1936, these retreats evolved into the organization known today by the nickname "Little Berks."

In 1973 conference at Douglass College of Rutgers University inaugurated a new era of the organization. As women's history became an established discipline, hundreds, and eventually thousands, of scholars and activists came together to hold a conference on the history of women, now referred to as the Berkshire Conference on the History of Women (aka the "Big Berks"). After holding two successive conferences in 1973 and 1974, the conference moved to a biennial schedule, and in the 1980s to triennial. Although the Big Berks always drew international participants, and the 1993 conference at Vassar involved particular efforts to bring international participants, the 2014 conference marked the first time it was held outside the United States (it was held in Toronto, Canada).

The Berkshire Conference continues to hold yearly retreats that combine conversation, socializing, outdoor activities, mentoring of junior scholars, and administrative business such as the selection of the annual book and article prizes. The Berkshire Conference also advocates for women in academia, funds graduate student fellowships, and plans the triennial Berkshire Conference on the History of Women, aka The "Big Berks."

== Big Berks Locations ==
- 2023 Santa Clara University
- 2020 Virtual event due to COVID-19 pandemic, originally scheduled for Johns Hopkins University
- 2017 Hofstra University
- 2014 University of Toronto
- 2011 University of Massachusetts Amherst
- 2008 University of Minnesota, Twin Cities
- 2005 Scripps College
- 2002 University of Connecticut
- 1999 University of Rochester
- 1996 University of North Carolina at Chapel Hill
- 1993 Vassar College
- 1990 Douglass College at Rutgers University
- 1987 Wellesley College
- 1984 Smith College
- 1981 Vassar College
- 1978 Mt. Holyoke College
- 1976 Bryn Mawr College
- 1973 Douglass College at Rutgers University
