= Christopher Clarke (judge) =

British judge

The Right Honourable Sir Christopher Clarke KC

Lord Justice of Appeal
- In office 1 October 2013 – 14 March 2017

Justice of the High Court
- In office 2005–2013

Personal details
- Born: 14 March 1947 (age 79)
- Education: Gonville and Caius College, Cambridge

Sir Christopher Simon Courtenay Stephenson Clarke (born 14 March 1947) is a British judge who is president of the Bermuda Court of Appeal. He was a lord justice of the Court of Appeal of England and Wales from 2013 to 2017.

Clarke was educated at Marlborough College and Gonville and Caius College, Cambridge.

He was called to the bar at Middle Temple in 1969, became a QC on 1984 and served as a judge of the High Court of Justice (Queen's Bench Division) from 2005 to 2013. Clarke was counsel to the Bloody Sunday Inquiry (1998–2004).
