= Beveridge Award =

The Albert J. Beveridge Award is awarded by the American Historical Association (AHA) for the best English-language book on American history (United States, Canada, or Latin America) from 1492 to the present. It was established on a biennial basis in 1939 in memory of United States Senator Albert J. Beveridge (1862–1927) of Indiana, former secretary and longtime member of the Association, through a gift from his wife, Catherine Eddy Beveridge and donations from AHA members from his home state. The award has been given annually since 1945.

== Recipients ==
- 1939 – John T. Horton for James Kent: A Study in Conservatism
- 1941 – Charles A. Barker for The Background of the Revolution in Maryland
- 1943 – Harold Whitman Bradley for American Frontier in Hawaii: The Pioneers, 1780-1843
- 1945 – John Richard Alden for John Stuart and the Southern Colonial Frontier
- 1946 – Arthur Eugene Bestor, Jr. for Backwoods Utopias: The Sectarian and Owenite Phases of Communitarian Socialism in America: 1663-1829
- 1947 – Lewis Hanke for The Spanish Struggle for Justice in the Conquest of America
- 1948 – Donald Fleming for John William Draper and the Religion of Science
- 1949 – Reynold M. Wik for Steam Power on the American Farm: A Chapter in Agricultural History, 1850–1920
- 1950 – Glyndon G. Van Deusen for Horace Greeley: Nineteenth Century Crusader
- 1951 – Robert Twyman for History of Marshall Field and Co., 1852–1906
- 1952 – Clarence Versteeg for Robert Morris
- 1953 – George R. Bentley for A History of the Freedman's Bureau
- 1954 – Arthur M. Johnson for The Development of American Petroleum Pipelines: A Study in Enterprise and Public Policy
- 1955 – Ian C.C. Graham for Colonists from Scotland: Emigration to North America, 1707–1783
- 1956 – Paul W. Schroeder for The Axis Alliance and Japanese-American Relations, 1941
- 1957 – David M. Pletcher for Rails, Mines and Progress: Seven American Promoters in Mexico, 1867-1911
- 1958 – Paul Conkin for Tomorrow a New World: The New Deal Community Program
- 1959 – Arnold M. Paul for Free Conservative Crisis and the Rule of Law: Attitudes of Bar and Bench, 1887–1895
- 1960 – Clarence C. Clendenen for The United States and Pancho Villa;: A study in unconventional diplomacy,
- 1960 – Nathan Miller for The Enterprise of a Free People: Canals and the Canal Fund in the New York Economy, 1792–1838
- 1961 – Calvin Dearmond Davis for The United States And The First Hague Peace Conference
- 1962 – Walter LaFeber for The New Empire: An Interpretation of American Expansion, 1860-1898
- 1963 – no award given
- 1964 – Linda Grant DePauw for The Eleventh Pillar: New York State and the Federal Constitution
- 1965 – Daniel M. Fox for The Discovery of Abundance
- 1966 – Herman Belz for Reconstructing the Union: Conflict of Theory and Policy during the Civil War
- 1968 – Michael Paul Rogin for Intellectuals and McCarthy: The Radical Specter
- 1969 – Sam Bass Warner, Jr. for The Private City: Philadelphia in Three Periods of Its Growth
- 1970 – Leonard L. Richards for "Gentlemen of Property and Standing": Anti-Abolition Mobs in Jacksonian America
- 1970 – Sheldon Hackney for Populism to Progressivism in Alabama
- 1971 – Carl N. Degler for Neither Black Nor White: Slavery and Race Relations in Brazil and the United States
- 1971 – David J. Rothman for The Discovery of the Asylum: Social Order and Disorder in the New Republic
- 1972 – James T. Lemon for The Best Poor Man's Country: Early Southeastern Pennsylvania
- 1973 – Richard Slotkin for Regeneration Through Violence: The Mythology of the American Frontier, 1600-1860
- 1974 – Peter H. Wood for Black Majority: Negroes in Colonial South Carolina from 1670 Through the Stono Rebellion
- 1975 – David Brion Davis for The Problem of Slavery in the Age of Revolution, 1770-1823
- 1976 – Edmund S. Morgan for American Slavery American Freedom: The Ordeal of Colonial Virginia
- 1977 – Henry F. May for The Enlightenment in America
- 1978 – John Leddy Phelan for The People and the King: The Comunero Revolution in Colombia, 1781
- 1979 – Calvin Martin for Keepers of the Game: Indian-Animal Relationships and the Fur Trade
- 1980 – John W. Reps for Cities of the American West: A History of Frontier Urban Planning
- 1981 – Paul G. E. Clemens for The Atlantic Economy and Colonial Maryland's Eastern Shore
- 1982 – Walter Rodney for A History of the Guyanese Working People, 1881-1905
- 1983 – Louis R. Harlan for Booker T. Washington: Volume 2: The Wizard Of Tuskegee, 1901-1915
- 1984 – Sean Wilentz for Chants Democratic: New York City and the Rise of the American Working Class, 1788-1850
- 1985 – Nancy M. Farriss for Maya society under colonial rule: The collective enterprise of survival
- 1986 – Alan S. Knight for The Mexican Revolution
- 1987 – Mary C. Karasch for Slave Life in Rio De Janeiro, 1808-1850
- 1988 – Jacquelyn Dowd Hall, James Leloudis, Robert Korstad, Mary Murphy, Christopher B. Daly, Lu Ann Jones for Like a Family: The Making of a Southern Cotton Mill World
- 1989 – Peter Novick for That Noble Dream: The 'Objectivity Question' and the American Historical Profession
- 1990 – Jon Butler for Awash in a Sea of Faith: Christianizing the American People
- 1991 – Richard Price for Alabi's World
- 1992 – Richard White for The Middle Ground: Indians, Empires, and Republics in the Great Lakes Region, 1650-1815
- 1993 – James Lockhart for The Nahuas After the Conquest: A Social and Cultural History of the Indians of Central Mexico, Sixteenth Through Eighteenth Centuries
- 1994 – Karen Ordahl Kupperman for Providence Island, 1630-1641: The Other Puritan Colony
- 1995 – Ann Douglas for Terrible Honesty: Mongrel Manhattan in the 1920s
- 1995 – Stephen Innes for Creating the Commonwealth: The Economic Culture of Puritan New England
- 1996 – Alan Taylor for William Cooper's Town: Power and Persuasion on the Frontier of the Early American Republic
- 1997 – William B. Taylor for Magistrates of the Sacred: Priests and Parishioners in Eighteenth-Century Mexico
- 1998 – Philip D. Morgan for Slave Counterpoint: Black Culture in the Eighteenth-Century Chesapeake and Lowcountry
- 1999 – Friedrich Katz for The Life and Times of Pancho Villa
- 2000 – Linda Gordon for The Great Arizona Orphan Abduction
- 2001 – Alexander Keyssar for The Right to Vote: The Contested History of Democracy in the United States
- 2002 – Mary A. Renda for Taking Haiti: Military Occupation and the Culture of U.S. Imperialism, 1915-1940
- 2003 – Ira Berlin for Generations of Captivity: A History of African-American Slaves
- 2004 – Edward L. Ayers for In the Presence of Mine Enemies: The Civil War in the Heart of America, 1859-1863
- 2005 – Melvin Patrick Ely for Israel on the Appomattox: A Southern Experiment in Black Freedom from the 1790s Through the Civil War
- 2006 – Louis S. Warren for Buffalo Bill's America: William Cody and the Wild West Show
- 2007 – Allan M. Brandt for The Cigarette Century: The Rise, Fall, and Deadly Persistence of the Product That Defined America
- 2008 – Scott Kurashige for The Shifting Grounds of Race: Black and Japanese Americans in the Making of Multiethnic Los Angeles
- 2009 – Karl Jacoby for Shadows at Dawn: A Borderlands Massacre and the Violence of History
- 2010 – John Robert McNeill for Mosquito Empires: Ecology and War in the Greater Caribbean, 1620–1914
- 2011 - Daniel Okrent for Last Call: The Rise and Fall of Prohibition
- 2012 - Rebecca J. Scott and Jean M. Hebrard for Freedom Papers: An Atlantic Odyssey in the Age of Emancipation
- 2013 - W. Jeffrey Bolster for The Mortal Sea: Fishing the Atlantic in the Age of Sail
- 2014 - Kate Brown for Plutopia: Nuclear Families, Atomic Cities, and the Great Soviet and American Plutonium Disasters
- 2015 - Elizabeth Fenn for Encounters at the Heart of the World: A History of the Mandan People
- 2015 - Greg Grandin for The Empire of Necessity: Slavery, Freedom, and Deception in the New World
- 2016 - Ann Twinam for Purchasing Whiteness: Pardos, Mulattos, and the Quest for Social Mobility in the Spanish Indies
- 2017 - David Chang, The World and All the Things upon It: Native Hawaiian Geographies of Exploration
- 2018 - Camilla Townsend - Annals of Native America: How the Nahuas of Colonial Mexico Kept Their History
- 2019 - Nan C. Enstad - Cigarettes, Inc.: An Intimate History of Corporate Imperialism
- 2020 - Jeremy Zallen - American Lucifers: The Dark History of Artificial Light, 1750–1865
- 2021 - Thavolia Glymph - The Women’s Fight: The Civil War’s Battles for Home, Freedom, and Nation
- 2022 - Roberto Saba - American Mirror: The United States and Brazil in the Age of Emancipation
- 2023 - Kirsten Silva Gruesz - Cotton Mather’s Spanish Lessons: A Study of Language, Race, and Belonging in the Early Americas
- 2024 - Dylan C. Penningroth - Before the Movement: The Hidden History of Black Civil Rights
- 2025 - Seth Rockman - Plantation Goods: A Material History of American Slavery
- 2026 - Lauren Duval - The Home Front: Revolutionary Households, Military Occupation, and the Making of American Independence

== See also ==
- List of history awards
