= Yemen Chronicle =

Book written by Steve Caton

Yemen Chronicle: An Anthropology of War and Mediation (Hill & Wang, 2005, ISBN 0809027259) is a book written by Harvard professor Steve Caton. It contains a years-long anthropological study of Yemen. The book has two formats: one of field notes done by Caton during his stay in Yemen, the other a review of his field notes after he left Yemen.

Yemen Chronicle was Caton's third published book. He wrote it during his 2001-2005 trips to Yemen. The initial intent was to write about anthropology, but the author's interest quickly shifted to focus on the country's hydrography, its evolving water management systems, and how it relates to the contemporary history of the country.
