= End of Reconstruction =

1877 ending of period in US history

The American Civil War (1861–1865) was immediately followed by the Reconstruction era of United States history in the later 1860s and 1870s, until the end of Reconstruction. Historians discuss a complex variety of factors that ultimately ended Reconstruction. In particular, the hotly contested 1876 presidential election resolved with the Bargain of 1877, which many historians roughly mark as concluding, or significantly motivating the conclusion of, the post-Civil War era.

== Congressional investigation into Reconstruction states: 1872 ==
On April 20, 1871, prior to the passage of the Ku Klux Klan Act (Last of three Enforcement Acts), on the same day, the U.S. Congress launched a 21-member investigation committee on the status of the Southern Reconstruction states North Carolina, South Carolina, Georgia, Mississippi, Alabama, and Florida. Congressional members on the committee included Rep. Benjamin Butler, Sen. Zachariah Chandler, and Sen. Francis P. Blair. Subcommittee members traveled into the South to interview the people living in their respective states. Those interviewed included top-ranking officials, such as Wade Hampton III, former South Carolina Gov. James L. Orr, and Nathan Bedford Forrest, a former Confederate general and prominent Ku Klux Klan leader (Forrest denied in his congressional testimony being a member). Other Southerners interviewed included farmers, doctors, merchants, teachers, and clergymen. The committee heard numerous reports of White violence against Blacks, while many Whites denied Klan membership or knowledge of violent activities. The majority report by Republicans concluded that the government would not tolerate any Southern "conspiracy" to resist violently the congressional Reconstruction. The committee completed its 13-volume report in February 1872. While President Ulysses S. Grant had been able to suppress the KKK through the Enforcement Acts, other paramilitary insurgents organized, including the White League in 1874, active in Louisiana; and the Red Shirts, with chapters active in Mississippi and the Carolinas. They used intimidation and outright attacks to run Republicans out of office and repress voting by Blacks, leading to White Democrats regaining power by the elections of the mid-to-late 1870s.

== Southern Democrats ==
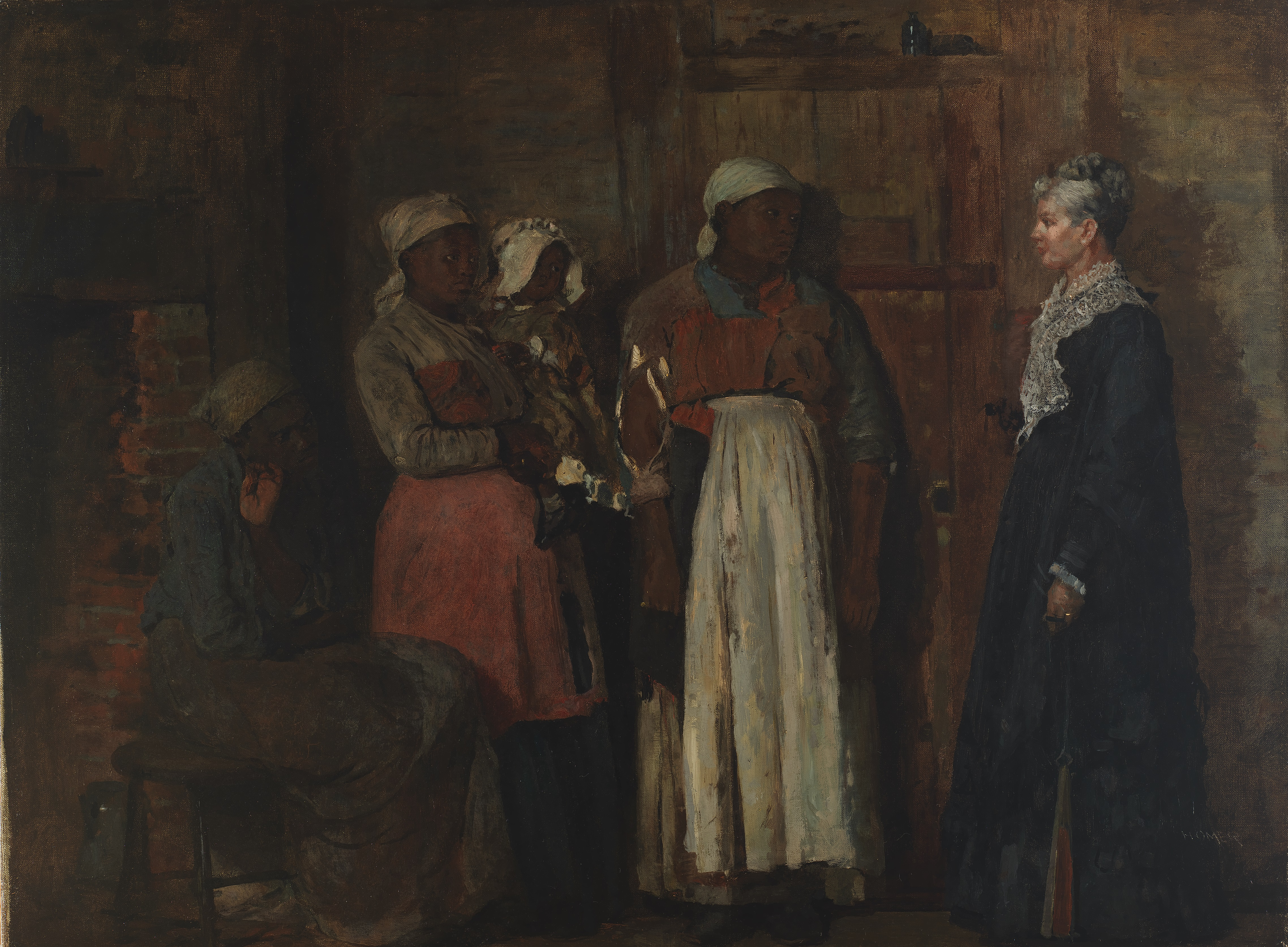
Winslow Homer's 1876 painting A Visit from the Old Mistress

While Republican whites supported measures for black civil rights, other whites typically opposed these measures. Some supported armed attacks to suppress blacks. They self-consciously defended their own actions within the framework of a white American discourse of resistance against tyrannical government, and they broadly succeeded in convincing many fellow White citizens, says Steedman.

The opponents of Reconstruction formed state political parties, affiliated with the national Democratic Party and often named the "Conservative Party". They supported or tolerated violent paramilitary groups, such as the White League in Louisiana and the Red Shirts in Mississippi and the Carolinas, that assassinated and intimidated both Black and White Republican leaders at election time. Historian George C. Rable called such groups the "military arm of the Democratic Party". By the mid-1870s, the "conservatives" and Democrats had aligned with the national Democratic Party, which enthusiastically supported their cause even as the national Republican Party was losing interest in Southern affairs.

Historian Walter L. Fleming, associated with the early 20th-century Dunning School, describes the mounting anger of Southern Whites:

The Negro troops, even at their best, were everywhere considered offensive by the native whites .... The Negro soldier, impudent by reason of his new freedom, his new uniform, and his new gun, was more than Southern temper could tranquilly bear, and race conflicts were frequent.

Often, these White Southerners identified as the "Conservative Party" or the "Democratic and Conservative Party" in order to distinguish themselves from the national Democratic Party and to obtain support from former Whigs. These parties sent delegates to the 1868 Democratic National Convention and abandoned their separate names by 1873 or 1874.

Most White members of both the planter and business class and common farmer class of the South opposed Reconstruction, Black civil rights and military rule and sought white supremacy. Democrats nominated some Blacks for political office and tried to entice other Blacks from the Republican side. When these attempts to combine with the Blacks failed, the planters joined the common farmers in simply trying to displace the Republican governments. The planters and their business allies dominated the self-styled "conservative" coalition that finally took control in the South. They were paternalistic toward the Blacks but feared they would use power to raise taxes and slow business development.

Fleming described the first results of the insurgent movement as "good", and the later ones as "both good and bad". According to Fleming (1907), the KKK "quieted the Negroes, made life and property safer, gave protection to women, stopped burnings, forced the Radical leaders to be more moderate, made the Negroes work better, drove the worst of the Radical leaders from the country and started the whites on the way to gain political supremacy". The evil result, Fleming said, was that lawless elements "made use of the organization as a cloak to cover their misdeeds .... The lynching habits of today [1907] are largely due to conditions, social and legal, growing out of Reconstruction." Historians have noted that the peak of lynchings took place near the turn of the century, decades after Reconstruction ended, as Whites were imposing Jim Crow laws and passing new state constitutions that disenfranchised the Blacks. The lynchings were used for intimidation and social control, with a frequency associated more with economic stresses and the settlement of sharecropper accounts at the end of the season, than for any other reason.

In 1917, Ellis Paxson Oberholtzer explained:

Outrages upon the former slaves in the South there were in plenty. Their sufferings were many. But white men, too, were victims of lawless violence, and in all portions of the North and the late "rebel" states. Not a political campaign passed without the exchange of bullets, the breaking of skulls with sticks and stones, the firing of rival club-houses. Republican clubs marched the streets of Philadelphia, amid revolver shots and brickbats, to save the Negroes from the "rebel" savages in Alabama .... The project to make voters out of black men was not so much for their social elevation as for the further punishment of the Southern white people—for the capture of offices for Radical scamps and the entrenchment of the Radical party in power for a long time to come in the South and in the country at large.

At election times, whites people engaged in increased violence in attempts to run Republicans out of office and suppress Black voting. The victims of this violence were overwhelmingly African American, as in the Colfax Massacre of 1873. After federal suppression of the Klan in the early 1870s, white insurgent groups tried to avoid open conflict with federal forces. In 1874, in the Battle of Liberty Place, the White League entered New Orleans with 5,000 members and defeated the police and militia, to occupy federal offices for three days in an attempt to overturn the disputed government of William Pitt Kellogg, but they retreated before federal troops reached the city. None was prosecuted. Their election-time tactics included violent intimidation of African American and Republican voters prior to elections, while avoiding conflict with the U.S. Army or the state militias and then withdrawing completely on election day. White supremacist violence continued in both the North and South; the White Liners movement to elect candidates dedicated to white supremacy reached as far as Ohio in 1875.

Historian Daniel Byman argues that white supremacist violence played a key role in the failure of Reconstruction. White supremacist groups such as the Ku Klux Klan (KKK) and the Red Shirts engaged in terroristic acts against Black voters and white Republicans. They used assassinations, violence, and economic means to undermine and devastate Reconstruction efforts. He estimates that perhaps tens of thousands of Black Americans were murdered during this period. Byman argues that the federal government's failure to enforce Reconstruction policies enabled these white supremacy groups. The federal government did not commit enough military resources, and this enabled white supremacist groups to consolidate power. Reconstruction culminated in the Compromise of 1877 and the rollback of Black political rights.

== Redeemers: 1873–1877 ==
The Redeemers were the Southern wing of the Bourbon Democrats the classically liberal, pro-business faction of the Democratic Party. They were a coalition which sought to regain political power, reestablish white supremacy, and oust the Radical Republicans from influence. Led by rich former planters, businessmen, and professionals, they dominated Southern politics in most areas from the 1870s to 1910.

== Republicans split nationally: election of 1872 ==
As early as 1868, Supreme Court Chief Justice Salmon P. Chase, a leading Radical during the war, concluded that:

Congress was right in not limiting, by its Reconstruction acts, the right of suffrage to Whites; but wrong in the exclusion from suffrage of certain classes of citizens and all unable to take its prescribed retrospective oath, and wrong also in the establishment of despotic military governments for the states and in authorizing military commissions for the trial of civilians in time of peace. There should have been as little military government as possible; no military commissions; no classes excluded from suffrage; and no oath except one of faithful obedience and support to the Constitution and laws, and of sincere attachment to the constitutional government of the United States.

By 1872, President Ulysses S. Grant had alienated large numbers of leading Republicans, including many Radicals, by the corruption of his administration and his use of federal soldiers to prop up Radical state regimes in the South. The opponents, called "Liberal Republicans", included founders of the party who expressed dismay that the party had succumbed to corruption. They were further wearied by the continued insurgent violence of Whites against Blacks in the South, especially around every election cycle, which demonstrated that the war was not over and changes were fragile. Leaders included editors of some of the nation's most powerful newspapers. Charles Sumner, embittered by the corruption of the Grant administration, joined the new party, which nominated editor Horace Greeley. The loosely organized Democratic Party reluctantly endorsed Greeley and the Liberal Republican platform at their convention.

Grant made up for the defections by new gains among Union veterans and by strong support from the "Stalwart" faction of his party (which depended on his patronage), and the Southern Republican Party. Grant won with 55.6% of the vote to Greeley's 43.8%. The Liberal Republican Party vanished and many former supporters—even former abolitionists—abandoned the cause of Reconstruction.

=== Republican coalition splintering in the South ===
In the South, political and racial tensions built up inside the Republican Party as they were attacked by the Democrats. In 1868, Georgia Democrats, with support from some Republicans, expelled all 28 Black Republican members from the state house, arguing Blacks were eligible to vote but not to hold office. In most states, the more Whiggish Republicans fought for control with the more Radical Republicans and their Black allies. Most of the 430 Republican newspapers in the South were edited by native Southerners—only 20 percent were edited by northerners. White businessmen generally boycotted Republican papers, which survived through government patronage. Nevertheless, in the increasingly bitter battles inside the Republican Party, those who supported Reconstruction usually lost; many of the disgruntled losers switched over to the Whig-leaning or Democratic side. In Mississippi, the Whiggish faction led by James Lusk Alcorn was decisively defeated by the Radical faction led by Adelbert Ames. The party lost support steadily as many supporters of Reconstruction left it; few recruits were acquired. The most bitter contest took place inside the Republican Party in Arkansas, where the two sides armed their forces and confronted each other in the streets; no actual combat took place in the Brooks–Baxter War. The faction led by Elisha Baxter finally prevailed when the White House intervened, but both sides were badly weakened, and the Democrats soon came to power.

Meanwhile, in state after state the freedmen were demanding a bigger share of the offices and patronage, squeezing out white allies but never commanding the numbers equivalent to their population proportion. By the mid-1870s: "The hard realities of Southern political life had taught the lesson that black constituents needed to be represented by black officials." The financial depression increased the pressure on Reconstruction governments, dissolving progress.

Finally, some of the more prosperous freedmen were joining the Democrats, as they were angered at the failure of the Republicans to help them acquire land. The South was "sparsely settled"; only 10 percent of Louisiana was cultivated, and 90 percent of Mississippi bottom land was undeveloped in areas away from the river fronts, but freedmen often did not have the stake to get started. They hoped that the government would help them acquire land which they could work. Only South Carolina created any land redistribution, establishing a land commission and resettling about 14,000 freedmen families and some poor Whites on land purchased by the state.

Although historians such as W. E. B. Du Bois celebrated a cross-racial coalition of poor Whites and Blacks, such coalitions rarely formed in these years. Writing in 1913, former Congressman Lynch, recalling his experience as a Black leader in Mississippi, explained that:

While the colored men did not look with favor upon a political alliance with the poor whites, it must be admitted that, with very few exceptions, that class of whites did not seek, and did not seem to desire such an alliance.

Lynch reported that poor Whites resented the job competition from freedmen. Furthermore, the poor Whites:

with a few exceptions, were less efficient, less capable, and knew less about matters of state and governmental administration than many of the former slaves .... As a rule, therefore, the Whites that came into the leadership of the Republican Party between 1872 and 1875 were representatives of the most substantial families of the land.

== Democrats trying a "New Departure" ==
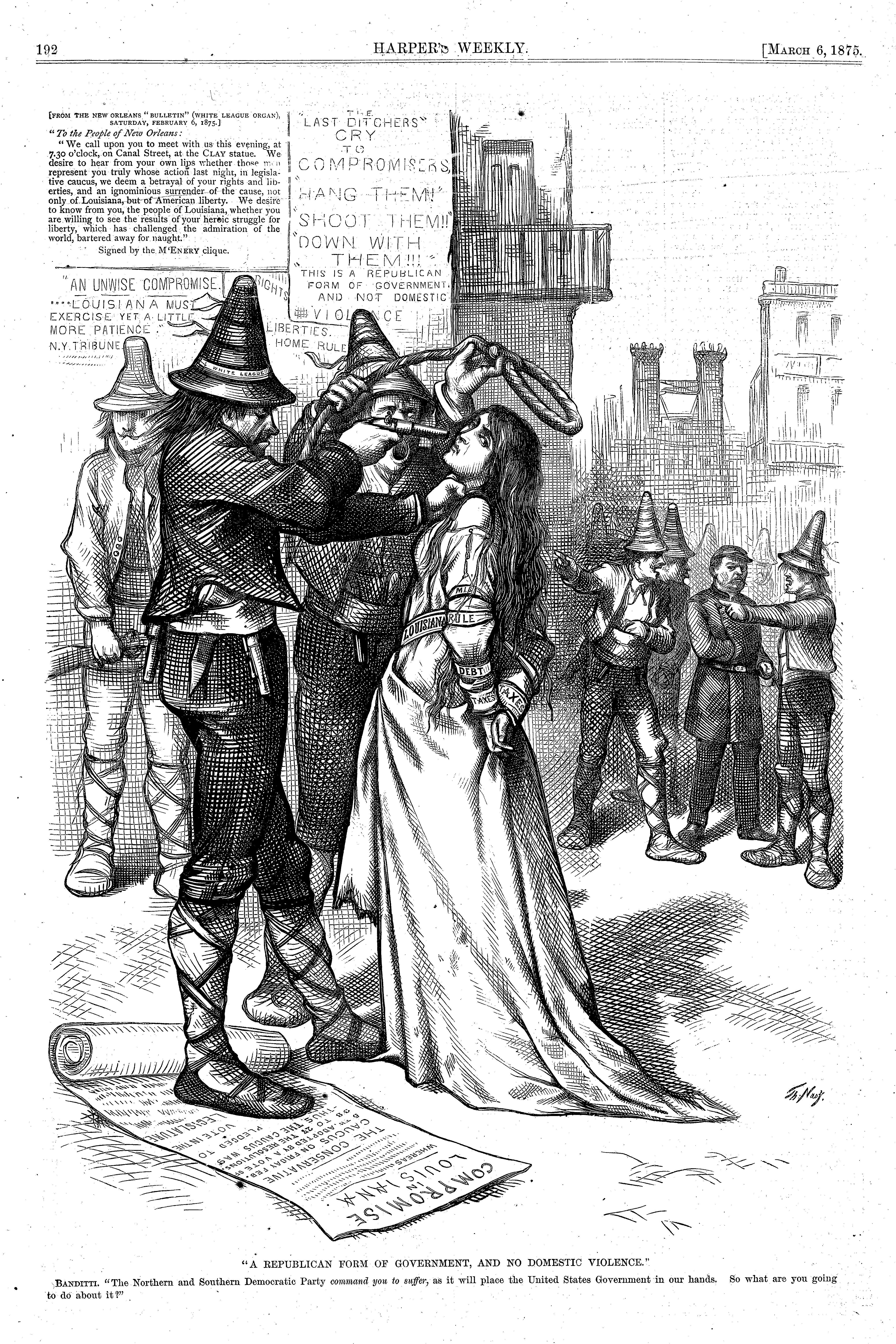
A Republican Form of Government and No Domestic Violence, by Thomas Nast, a political cartoon about the Wheeler Compromise in Louisiana, published in Harper's Weekly, March 6, 1875

By 1870, the Democratic leadership across the South decided it had to end its opposition to Reconstruction and Black suffrage to survive and move on to new issues. The Grant administration had proven by its crackdown on the Ku Klux Klan that it would use as much federal power as necessary to suppress open anti-Black violence. Democrats in the North concurred with these Southern Democrats. They wanted to fight the Republican Party on economic grounds rather than race. The New Departure offered the chance for a clean slate without having to re-fight the Civil War every election. Furthermore, many wealthy Southern landowners thought they could control part of the newly enfranchised Black electorate to their own advantage.

Not all Democrats agreed; an insurgent element continued to resist Reconstruction no matter what. Eventually, a group called "Redeemers" took control of the party in the Southern states. They formed coalitions with conservative Republicans, including supporters of Reconstruction, emphasizing the need for economic modernization. Railroad building was seen as a panacea since Northern capital was needed. The new tactics were a success in Virginia where William Mahone built a winning coalition. In Tennessee, the Redeemers formed a coalition with Republican Governor Dewitt Clinton Senter. Across the South, some Democrats switched from the race issue to taxes and corruption, charging that Republican governments were corrupt and inefficient. With a continuing decrease in cotton prices, taxes squeezed cash-poor farmers who rarely saw $20 in currency a year, but had to pay taxes in currency or lose their farms. But major planters, who had never paid taxes before, often recovered their property even after confiscation.

In North Carolina, Republican Governor William Woods Holden used state troops against the Klan, but the prisoners were released by federal judges. Holden became the first governor in American history to be impeached and removed from office. Republican political disputes in Georgia split the party and enabled the Redeemers to take over.

In the North, a live-and-let-live attitude made elections more like a sporting contest. But in the Deep South, many White citizens had not reconciled with the defeat of the war or the granting of citizenship to freedmen. As an Alabamian supporter of Reconstruction explained: "Our contest here is for life, for the right to earn our bread, ... for a decent and respectful consideration as human beings and members of society."

== Panic of 1873 ==
The Panic of 1873 (a depression) hit the Southern economy hard and disillusioned many Republicans who had gambled that railroads would pull the South out of its poverty. The price of cotton fell by half; many small landowners, local merchants, and cotton factors (wholesalers) went bankrupt. Sharecropping for Black and White farmers became more common as a way to spread the risk of owning land. The old abolitionist element in the North was aging away, or had lost interest, and was not replenished. Many northern whites returned to the North or joined the Redeemers. Blacks had an increased voice in the Republican Party, but across the South it was divided by internal bickering and was rapidly losing its cohesion. Many local Black leaders started emphasizing individual economic progress in cooperation with White elites, rather than racial political progress in opposition to them, a conservative attitude that foreshadowed Booker T. Washington.

Nationally, President Grant was blamed for the depression; the Republican Party lost 96 seats in all parts of the country in the 1874 elections. The Bourbon Democrats took control of the House and were confident of electing Samuel J. Tilden president in 1876. President Grant was not running for re-election and seemed to be losing interest in the South. States fell to the Redeemers, with only four in Republican hands in 1873: Arkansas, Louisiana, Mississippi, and South Carolina. Arkansas then fell after the violent Brooks–Baxter War in 1874 ripped apart the Republican Party there.

== Violence ==
In the lower South, violence increased as new insurgent groups arose, including the Red Shirts in Mississippi and the Carolinas, and the White League in Louisiana. The disputed election in Louisiana in 1872 found both Republican and Democratic candidates holding inaugural balls while returns were reviewed. Both certified their own slates for local parish offices in many places, causing local tensions to rise. Finally, federal support helped certify the Republican as governor.

Slates for local offices were certified by each candidate. In rural Grant Parish in the Red River Valley, freedmen fearing a Democratic attempt to take over the parish government reinforced defenses at the small Colfax courthouse in late March. White militias gathered from the area a few miles outside the settlement. Rumors and fears abounded on both sides. William Ward, an African American Union veteran and militia captain, mustered his company in Colfax and went to the courthouse. On Easter Sunday, April 13, 1873, the Whites attacked the defenders at the courthouse. There was confusion about who shot one of the White leaders after an offer by the defenders to surrender. It was a catalyst to mayhem. In the end, three Whites died and 120–150 Blacks were killed, some 50 that evening while being held as prisoners. The disproportionate numbers of Black to White fatalities and documentation of brutalized bodies are why contemporary historians call it the Colfax Massacre rather than the Colfax Riot, as it was known locally.

This marked the beginning of heightened insurgency and attacks on Republican officeholders and freedmen in Louisiana and other Deep South states. In Louisiana, Judge T. S. Crawford and District Attorney P. H. Harris of the 12th Judicial District were shot off their horses and killed by ambush October 8, 1873, while going to court. One widow wrote to the Department of Justice that her husband was killed because he was a Union man, telling "the efforts made to screen those who committed a crime".

Political violence was endemic in Louisiana. In 1874, the White militias coalesced into paramilitary organizations such as the White League, first in parishes of the Red River Valley. The new organization operated openly and had political goals: the violent overthrow of Republican rule and suppression of Black voting. White League chapters soon rose in many rural parishes, receiving financing for advanced weaponry from wealthy men. In the Coushatta Massacre in 1874, the White League assassinated six White Republican officeholders and five to 20 Black witnesses outside Coushatta, Red River Parish. Four of the White men were related to the Republican representative of the parish, who was married to a local woman; three were native to the region.

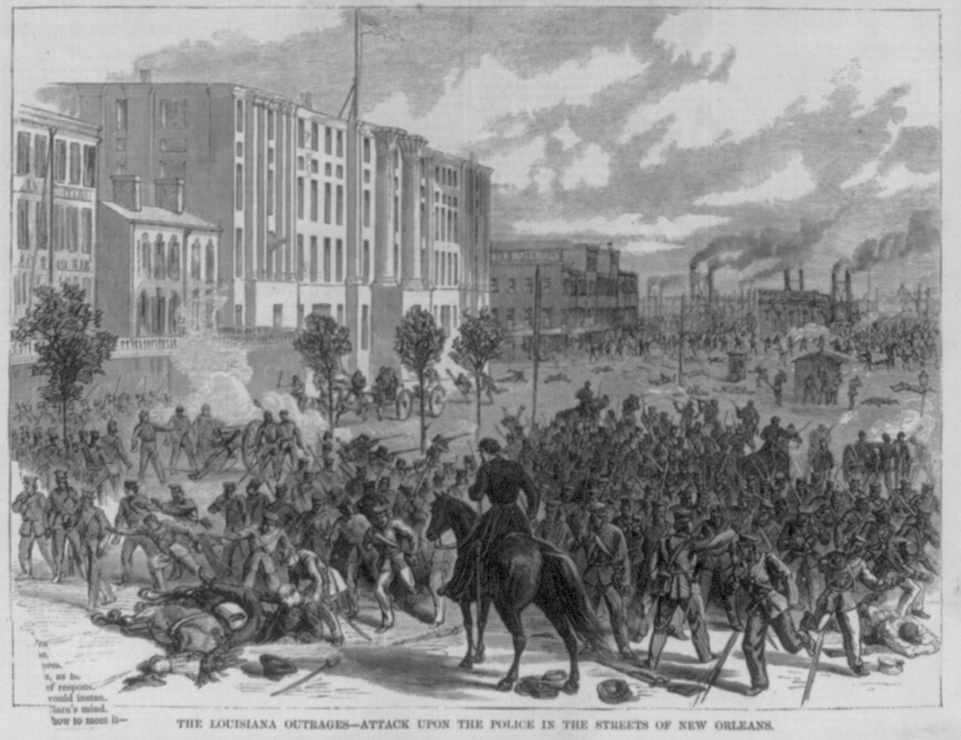
White Leaguers attacking the New Orleans integrated police force and state militia, Battle of Liberty Place, 1874

Later in 1874 the White League mounted a serious attempt to unseat the Republican governor of Louisiana, in a dispute that had simmered since the 1872 election. It brought 5,000 troops to New Orleans to engage and overwhelm forces of the metropolitan police and state militia to turn Republican Governor William P. Kellogg out of office and seat John McEnery. The White League took over and held the state house and city hall, but they retreated before the arrival of reinforcing federal troops. Kellogg had asked for reinforcements before, and Grant finally responded, sending additional troops to try to quell violence throughout plantation areas of the Red River Valley, although 2,000 troops were already in the state.

Similarly, the Red Shirts, another paramilitary group, arose in 1875 in Mississippi and the Carolinas. Like the White League and White Liner rifle clubs, to which 20,000 men belonged in North Carolina alone, these groups operated as a "military arm of the Democratic Party", to restore White supremacy.

Democrats and many Northern Republicans agreed that Confederate nationalism and slavery were dead—the war goals were achieved—and further federal military interference was an undemocratic violation of historical Republican values. The victory of Rutherford B. Hayes in the hotly contested 1875 Ohio gubernatorial election indicated his "let alone" policy toward the South would become Republican policy, as happened when he won the 1876 Republican nomination for president.

This shift in federal attitude marked the beginning of a retreat from actively enforcing the Reconstruction policies in the south. As federal commitment declined, white supremacist organizations like the Ku Klux Klan and the Red Shirts escalated their violent campaigns to suppress Black political participation. These acts of violence also aimed to dismantle Republican led governments and cause instability. Actions from these groups proved that a federal response was needed in order to sustain Reconstruction.

Historians such as Daniel Byman argue that the failure of Reconstruction was driven not merely by political compromise alone, but by the federal government's inability to suppress a campaign of racial terrorism. White supremacist groups used assassinations, beatings, arson, and coordinated intimidation to eliminate Black leadership and frighten freedmen away from voting. These were not isolated acts of violence, but part of a deliberate strategy to destroy Reconstruction. "The goal of this violence was not random terror", Byman writes, "but targeted political control", emphasizing that the collapse of Reconstruction was a calculated success for white supremacists, not an accidental failure.

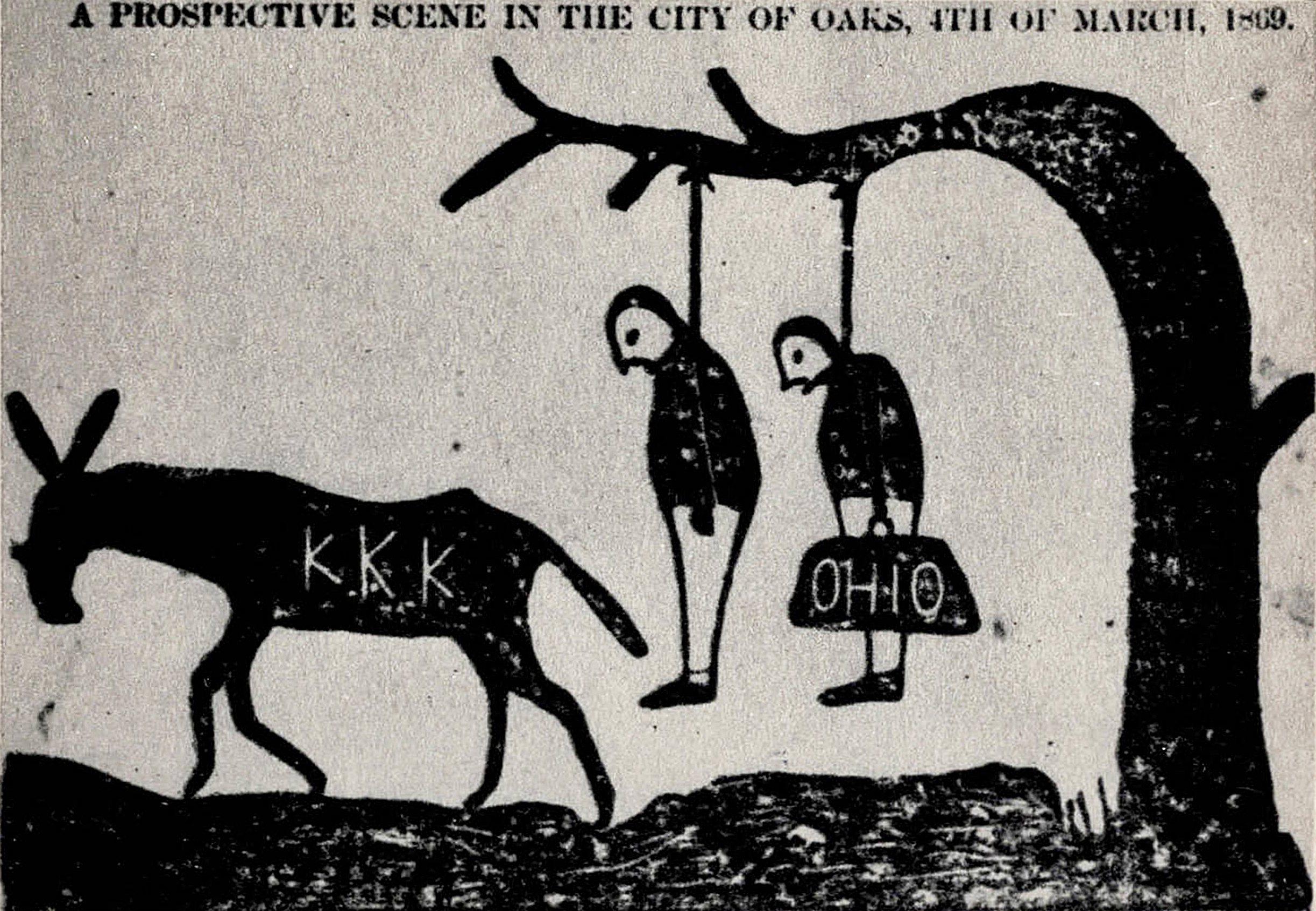
A cartoon threatening that the KKK will lynch scalawags (left) and carpetbaggers (right) on March 4, 1869. Image is of Arad Simon Lakin ("Ohio") and Noah B. Cloud hanging from the tree. March 4, 1869 is the day Horatio Seymour, a Democrat, will supposedly become president. Tuscaloosa, Alabama, Independent Monitor, Sept. 1, 1868. The cartoonist had actual local politicians in mind. A full-scale scholarly history analyzes the cartoonː Guy W. Hubbs, Searching for Freedom after the Civil War: Klansman, Carpetbagger, Scalawag, and Freedman ̈(2015)

Federal enforcement measures such as the Enforcement Acts and the Ku Klux Klan Act of 1871 were inconsistently applied and increasingly unpopular in the North. As Byman notes, "The lack of an enduring presence enables insurgents to simply wait out government forces," likening the situation to failed modern counterinsurgency efforts. By the time of the Compromise of 1877, federal troops had been withdrawn from most of the South. This effectively signaled the end of Reconstruction enforcement. This resulting power vacuum allowed extremist groups to seize control of local governments and reimpose white supremacy.

Historian Sarah Sullivan further argues that the violence of the Ku Klux Klan during Reconstruction has been historically underestimated. Drawing from congressional hearings and testimonies, she documents how Klan members operated with impunity. They often targeted Black communities under the pretext of punishing "criminal behavior". In reality, such crimes were often as simple as voting Republican or pursuing interracial relationships. "Blacks who contended for their rights and were not much afraid were deemed 'very bad negroes', a label that often resulted in death," Sullivan writes, illustrating how assertions of basic rights could lead to lynching.

The Klan's brutality extended to public torture, whipping, and murder, including the spectacle-style killings later associated with the Jim Crow era. Sullivan writes, "Lynchings done by the Ku Klux Klan acted under the pretext of all three ... justice, race, and tradition ... establishing a pattern of violence that persisted for decades." These actions had a chilling effect on Black communities, where families were often too afraid to testify or report crimes. White Democratic lawmakers, some aligned with the Klan, frequently obstructed investigations, contributing to a culture of impunity. Together, Byman and Sullivan demonstrated that the failure of Reconstruction was not a passive collapse, but a result of federal negligence. This negligence allowed for the increase of insurgent violence. As Byman explains, "White supremacists opposed to Reconstruction effectively mobilized their community, using terrorism as an intimidation tactic to undermine Black political power and force uncommitted white Southerners to their side." Without federal protection, even Black citizens who attempted to participate in public life faced extreme danger. Sullivan's research shows how that fear became an effective substitute for law, eroding democratic institutions at a local level. In the end, the collapse of Reconstruction was a warning. The story of its failure is ultimately the story of how democracy can unravel when governments tolerate political violence. The withdrawal of troops and the abandonment of Reconstruction allowed terror to dictate power in the South. This not only dismantled the gains made after emancipation but laid the foundation for systemic racial injustice that persisted well into the 20th century.

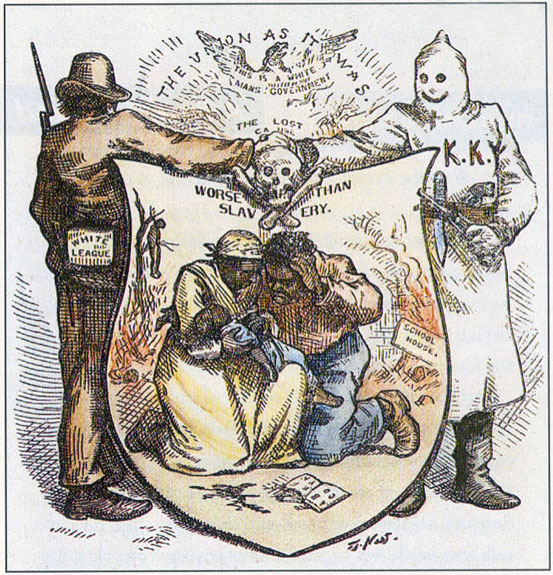
This cartoon, drawn by Thomas Nast and published in Harper's Weekly in 1874 shows how life for African Americans after the Civil War had become even more dangerous than during slavery. It highlights the brutal violence and lawlessness unleashed by groups like the KKK once the government stopped protecting freed people. A depiction of a burning schoolhouse is shown in the shield.

An explosion of violence accompanied the campaign for Mississippi's 1875 election, in which Red Shirts and Democratic rifle clubs, operating in the open, threatened or shot enough Republicans to decide the election for the Democrats. Hundreds of Black men were killed. Republican Governor Adelbert Ames asked Grant for federal troops to fight back; Grant initially refused, saying public opinion was "tired out" of the perpetual troubles in the South. Ames fled the state as the Democrats took over Mississippi.

The campaigns and elections of 1876 were marked by additional murders and attacks on Republicans in Louisiana, North Carolina, South Carolina, and Florida. In South Carolina the campaign season of 1876 was marked by murderous outbreaks and fraud against freedmen. Red Shirts paraded with arms behind Democratic candidates; they killed Blacks in the Hamburg and Ellenton, South Carolina massacres. One historian estimated 150 Blacks were killed in the weeks before the 1876 election across South Carolina. Red Shirts prevented almost all Black voting in two majority-Black counties. The Red Shirts were also active in North Carolina.

A 2019 study found that counties that were occupied by the U.S. Army to enforce enfranchisement of emancipated slaves were more likely to elect Black politicians. The study also found that "political murders by White-supremacist groups occurred less frequently" in these counties than in Southern counties that were not occupied.

== Election of 1876 ==
Reconstruction continued in South Carolina, Louisiana, and Florida until 1877. The elections of 1876 were accompanied by heightened violence across the Deep South. A combination of ballot stuffing and intimidating Blacks suppressed their vote even in majority Black counties. The White League was active in Louisiana. After Republican Rutherford B. Hayes won the disputed 1876 presidential election, the national Compromise of 1877 (a corrupt bargain) was reached.

The White Democrats in the South agreed to accept Hayes's victory if he withdrew the last federal troops. By this point, the North was weary of insurgency. White Democrats controlled most of the Southern legislatures and armed militias controlled small towns and rural areas. Blacks considered Reconstruction a failure because the federal government withdrew from enforcing their ability to exercise their rights as citizens.

== Hayes ending Reconstruction ==
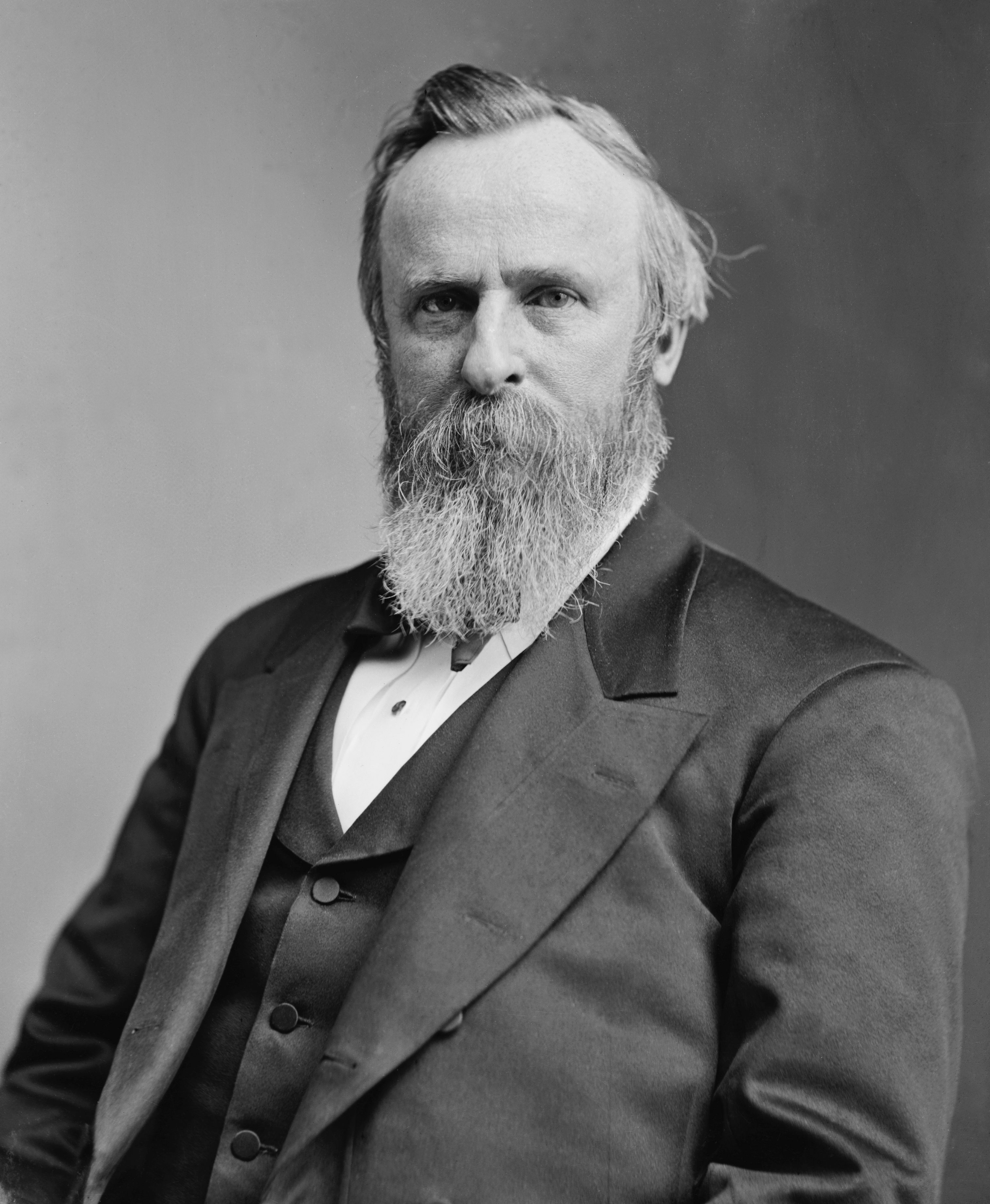
Rutherford B. Hayes, 19th President of the United States (1877–1881)

On January 29, 1877, President Grant signed the Electoral Commission Act, which set up a 15-member commission of eight Republicans and seven Democrats to settle the disputed 1876 election. Since the Constitution did not explicitly indicate how Electoral College disputes were to be resolved, Congress was forced to consider other methods to settle the crisis. Many Democrats argued that Congress as a whole should determine which certificates to count. However, the chances that this method would result in a harmonious settlement were slim, as the Democrats controlled the House, while the Republicans controlled the Senate. Several Hayes supporters, on the other hand, argued that the President pro tempore of the Senate had the authority to determine which certificates to count, because he was responsible for chairing the congressional session at which the electoral votes were to be tallied. Since the office of president pro tempore was occupied by a Republican, Senator Thomas W. Ferry of Michigan, this method would have favored Hayes. Still others proposed that the matter should be settled by the Supreme Court. In a stormy session that began on March 1, 1877, the House debated the objection for about twelve hours before overruling it. Immediately, another spurious objection was raised, this time to the electoral votes from Wisconsin. Again, the Senate voted to overrule the objection, while a filibuster was conducted in the House. However, the Speaker of the House, Democrat Samuel J. Randall, refused to entertain dilatory motions. Eventually, the filibusterers gave up, allowing the House to reject the objection in the early hours of March 2. The House and Senate then reassembled to complete the count of the electoral votes. At 4:10 am on March 2, Senator Ferry announced that Hayes and Wheeler had been elected to the presidency and vice presidency, by an electoral margin of 185–184.

The Democrats agreed not to block Hayes's inauguration based on a "back room" deal. Key to this deal was the understanding that federal troops would no longer interfere in Southern politics despite substantial election-associated violence against Blacks. The Southern states indicated that they would protect the lives of African Americans; however, such promises were largely not kept. Hayes's friends also let it be known that he would promote federal aid for internal improvements, including help with a railroad in Texas (which never happened) and name a Southerner to his cabinet (this did happen). With the end to the political role of Northern troops, the president had no method to enforce Reconstruction; thus, this "back room" deal signaled the end of American Reconstruction.

After assuming office on March 4, 1877, President Hayes removed troops from the capitals of the remaining Reconstruction states, Louisiana and South Carolina, allowing the Redeemers to have full control of these states. President Grant had already removed troops from Florida, before Hayes was inaugurated, and troops from the other Reconstruction states had long since been withdrawn. Hayes appointed David M. Key from Tennessee, a Southern Democrat, to the position of postmaster general. By 1879, thousands of African American "Exodusters" packed up and headed to new opportunities in Kansas.

The Democrats gained control of the Senate, and had complete control of Congress, having taken over the House in 1875. Hayes vetoed bills from the Democrats that outlawed the Republican Enforcement Acts; however, with the military underfunded, Hayes could not adequately enforce these laws. African-Americans remained involved in Southern politics, particularly in Virginia, which was run by the biracial Readjuster Party.

Numerous African-Americans were elected to local office through the 1880s, and in the 1890s in some states, biracial coalitions of populists and Republicans briefly held control of state legislatures. In the last decade of the 19th century, Southern states elected five Black U.S. congressmen before disenfranchising state constitutions were passed throughout the former Confederacy.

== Bibliography ==
- Fleming, Walter L. (1906–1907). Documentary History of Reconstruction: Political, Military, Social, Religious, Educational, and Industrial. 2 vols. Presents a broad collection of primary sources; Vol. 1: On National Politics; Vol. 2: On States (via Google Books).
- Foner, Eric (1988). Reconstruction: America's Unfinished Revolution, 1863–1877. New York: Harper & Row. ISBN 0-06-015851-4.
- Foner, Eric (1990). A Short History of Reconstruction. New York: Harper Perennial. ISBN 9780060964313.
- Franklin, John Hope (1961). Reconstruction After the Civil War. University of Chicago Press. ISBN 0-226-26079-8.
- Lemann, Nicholas (2007). Redemption: The Last Battle of the Civil War. New York: Farrar, Straus & Giroux. pp. 15–21. ISBN 9780374530693.
- Lynch, John R. (1913). The Facts of Reconstruction. New York: The Neale Publishing Company. Archived from the original on January 13, 2020. One of the first Black congressmen during Reconstruction.
- McFeely, William S. (2002) [1981]. Grant: A Biography. New York City: W. W. Norton & Company. ISBN 978-0-393-01372-6. OCLC 6889578.
- McPherson, Edward (1875). The Political History of the United States of America During the Period of Reconstruction. Solomons & Chapman.
- Oberholtzer, Ellis Paxson (1917). A History of the United States Since the Civil War: 1865–68. Vol. 1.
- Perman, Michael (1985). The Road to Redemption: Southern Politics, 1869–1879. Chapel Hill: University of North Carolina Press. ISBN 978-0807841419.
- Williams, T. Harry (November 1946). "An Analysis of Some Reconstruction Attitudes". Journal of Southern History. 12 (4): 469–486. doi:10.2307/2197687. JSTOR 2197687.
- Woodward, C. Vann (1966). Reunion and Reaction: The Compromise of 1877 and the End of Reconstruction. Oxford University Press. ISBN 978-0-19-506423-0.
