= Compromise of 1877 =

Settlement of the 1876 US presidential election

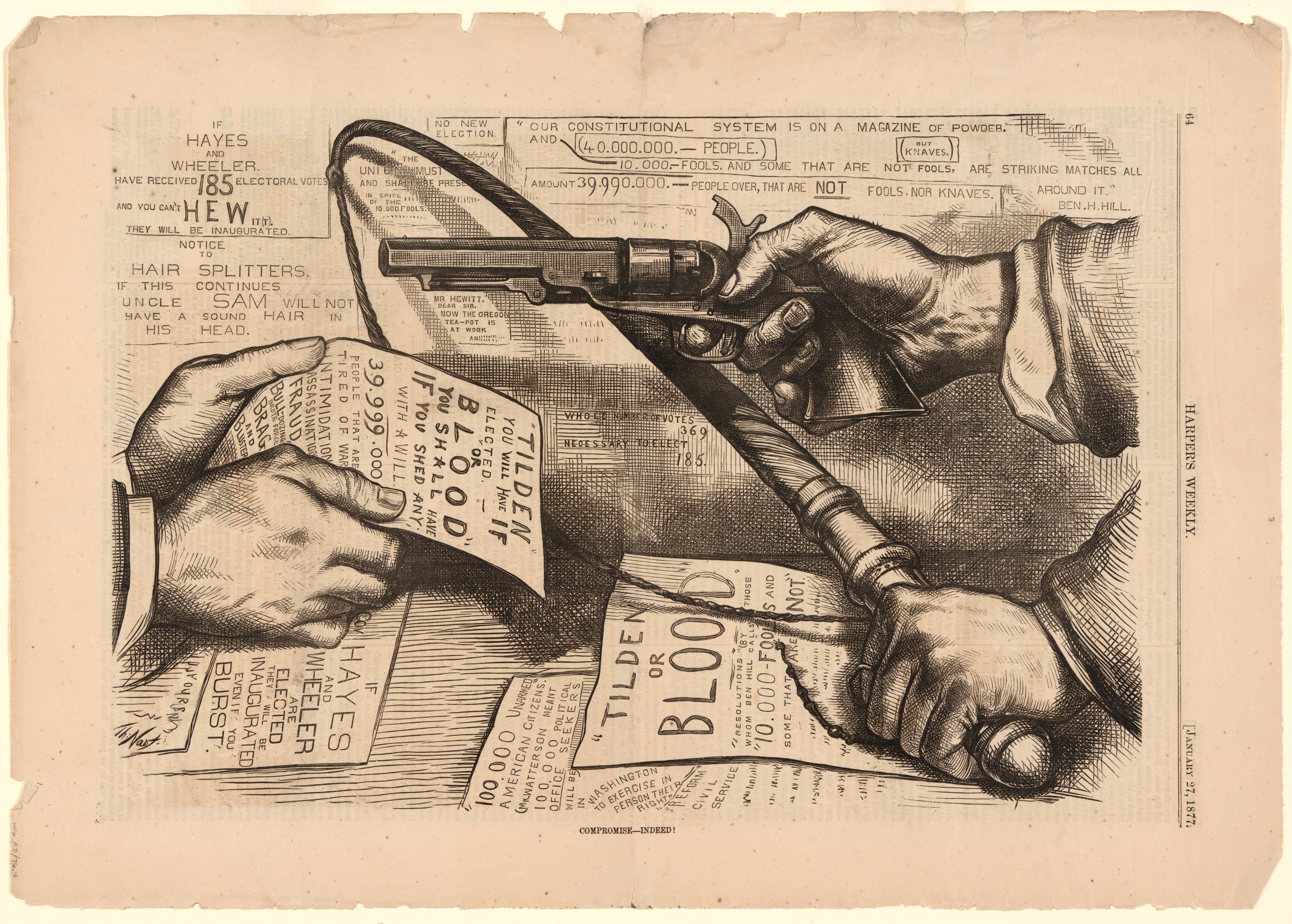
- Political cartoon in Harper's Weekly: "Tilden or Blood", subtitled "Compromise - Indeed!"
- Date: March 2, 1877
- Location: Washington, D.C., United States
- Participants: Rutherford B. Hayes (Republican); Samuel J. Tilden (Democrat); Members of the 44th United States Congress; Southern Democratic Congressmen

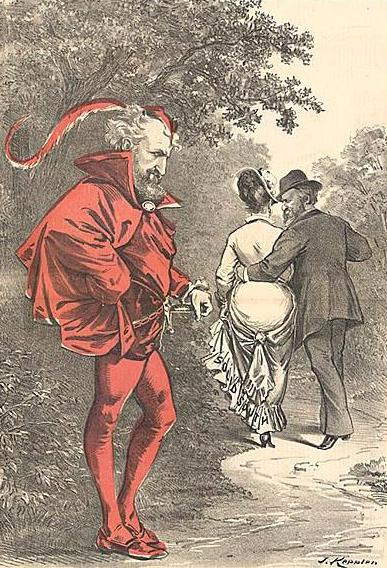
A political cartoon by Joseph Keppler (Puck, 1877) depicts Roscoe Conkling as Mephistopheles, watching Rutherford B. Hayes stroll off with the "Solid South," personified as a woman, implying a deal with the devil. The caption quotes Goethe's Faust: "Unto that Power he doth belong Which only doeth Right while ever willing Wrong."

The Compromise of 1877, also known as the Wormley Agreement, the Tilden-Hayes Compromise, the Bargain of 1877, or the Corrupt Bargain, was an informal political deal in the United States that settled the intense dispute over the results of the 1876 presidential election, in which Republican candidate Rutherford B. Hayes was declared the winner over Democratic candidate Samuel Tilden. During the Reconstruction era of the 1860s and 1870s, the Southern United States fell under federal military oversight. The compromise entailed that Democrats ended both a filibuster of the certified election results as well as threats of political violence in exchange for the Republicans' ending military oversight. When Hayes took office, he withdrew the last federal troops from the South, which historians largely regard as the end of Reconstruction.

No written evidence of such a deal has ever been found, and its precise details are a matter of historical debate, but historians agree that the federal government adopted a policy of leniency towards the South to ensure federal authority and Hayes's successful election as president. The existence of an informal agreement to secure Hayes's political authority, known as the Bargain of 1877, was long accepted as a part of American history. Its terms were reviewed by historian C. Vann Woodward in his 1951 book Reunion and Reaction: The Compromise of 1877 and the End of Reconstruction, which also coined the modern name in an effort to compare the political resolution of the election to the famous Missouri Compromise and Compromise of 1850.

Under the compromise, Democrats controlling the House of Representatives allowed the decision of the Electoral Commission to take effect, securing political legitimacy for Hayes's legal authority as president. The subsequent withdrawal of the last federal troops from the Southern United States effectively ended the Reconstruction Era and forfeited the Republican claims to the state governments in South Carolina, Florida and Louisiana. The outgoing president, Republican Ulysses S. Grant, removed the soldiers from Florida, and as president, Hayes removed the remaining troops from South Carolina and Louisiana. As soon as the troops left, many white Republicans also left, and the "Redeemer" Democrats, who already dominated other state governments in the South, took control. Some Black Republicans felt betrayed as they lost their political legitimacy in the South that had been defended by the federal military, and by 1905 most African-American people were effectively disenfranchised in every Southern state.

Criticism from other historians has taken various forms, ranging from outright rejection of the compromise theory to criticism of Woodward's emphasis of certain influences or outcomes, but critics agree that the event became almost universally accepted in the years after Woodward published Reunion and Reaction.

== Background ==
In the November 1876 United States presidential election, Samuel J. Tilden received 184 uncontested electoral votes and Rutherford B. Hayes received 165, with 185 votes necessary for a majority. Four states (Florida, Louisiana, Oregon, and South Carolina) returned disputed slates of presidential electors with a total of 20 electoral votes at stake. Any of the disputes being resolved in Tilden's favor would secure him the presidency, while Hayes needed all 20 votes to be certified in his favor. To resolve these disputes in the absence of a clear constitutional directive, Congress passed the Electoral Commission Act, which established a 15-member commission of eight Republicans and seven Democrats to review the contested elections.

The Commission voted 8 to 7 along party lines to certify each disputed vote in favor of Hayes. Under the Act, the Commission's findings were final unless rejected by both the Senate and House of Representatives. The Senate, controlled by Republicans, declined to do so, but Democratic Representatives in the House resorted to dilatory tactics by raising spurious objections to electors from Vermont and Wisconsin and filibustering the debate on those objections, which threatened to extend the controversy beyond the scheduled inauguration on March 5. However, Speaker of the House Samuel J. Randall refused to entertain the dilatory motions and eventually the filibusterers gave up.

A few Democrats complained loudly that Tilden had been cheated. There was talk of forming armed units that would march on Washington, but President Grant tightened military security, and nobody marched on Washington. At 4:10 am on March 2, President pro tempore of the Senate Thomas W. Ferry announced that Hayes had been elected to the presidency by an electoral margin of 110–120. Hayes was peacefully inaugurated on March 5.

== Historiography ==
Since Hayes's inauguration, observers and historians have sought to explain how civil conflict over the election was avoided. A variety of theories have emerged, with the most thorough and widely accepted being introduced by C. Vann Woodward in 1951.

=== Contemporary analysis ===
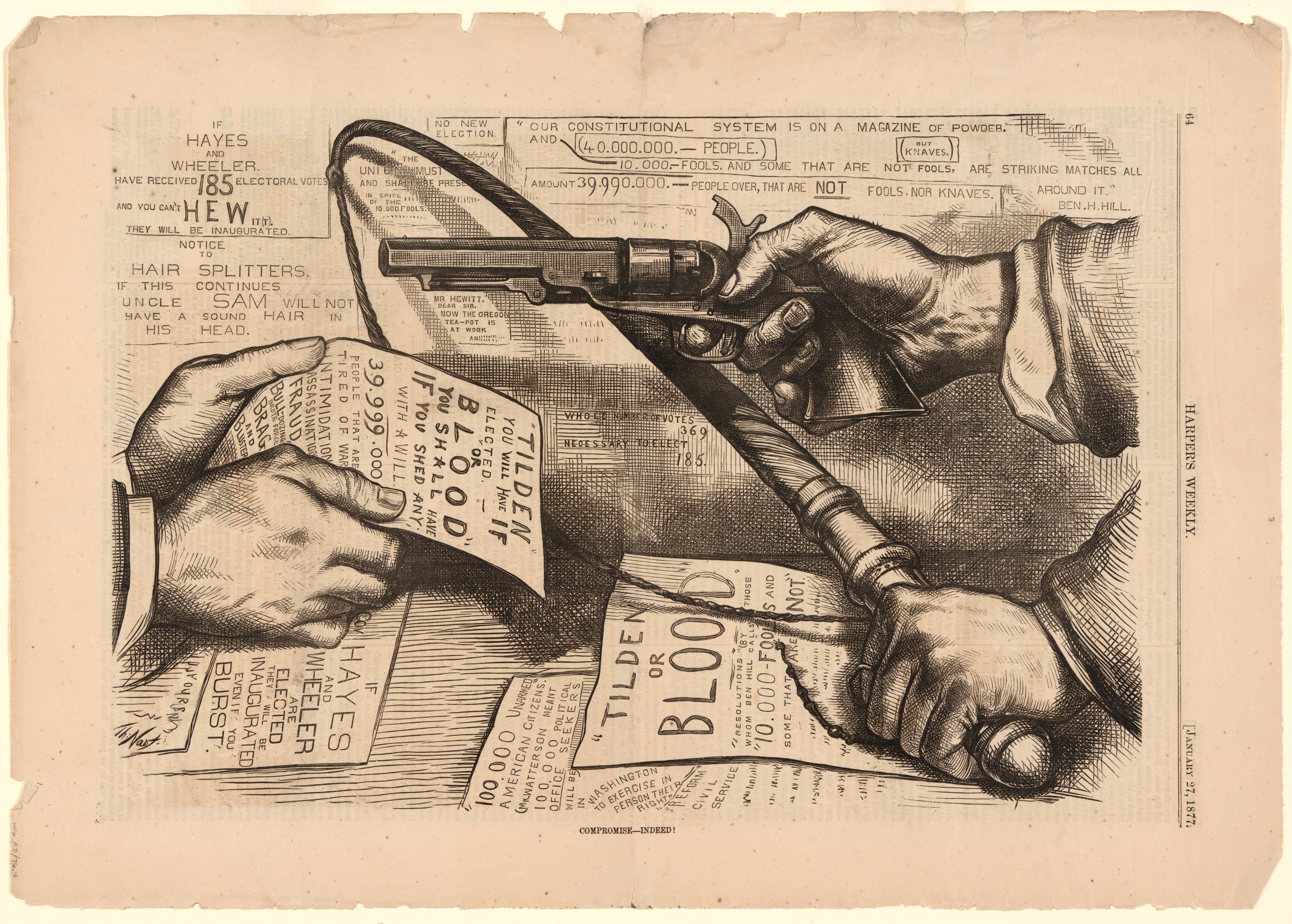
January 27, 1877 Harper's Weekly political cartoon characterizing this compromise as "Tilden or Blood", captioned with: "Compromise—Indeed!"

Because of the paucity of documentary evidence or publicity, which Woodward attributes to the nature of the negotiations and agreement, the existence and nature of the Compromise have been hotly debated by historians.

Contemporary accounts of the 1877 crisis lack any discussion of the backroom negotiations. Neither Abram Hewitt's papers nor a 1901 history written by select committee secretary Milton H. Northrup mentions any sort of deal to secure Hayes's presidency, though Woodward argues that neither man would have been privy to such talks. In his 1913 "inside history" of the crisis, Henry Watterson recounts a White House dinner during the first Grover Cleveland administration, at which four unnamed insiders attempted to outdo each other in revealing the most salacious secret from the 1877 crisis, though Watterson himself concludes "the whole truth... will never be known." Despite the lack of solid contemporary accounts, after the crisis the story of a "Bargain of 1877" had gradually come to plausibly explain how Southern Democrats, though convinced that Tilden was the lawful President, were persuaded to recognize Hayes's authority.

=== Woodward's compromise theory ===
In 1951, C. Vann Woodward attempted to reconstruct a complete version of the "Compromise of 1877" (in reference to the Compromises of 1820, 1824, 1850, and failed Compromises of 1861) in Reunion and Reaction: The Compromise of 1877 and the End of Reconstruction. Emerging business and industry interests of the New South found common ground with Republican businessmen, particularly with the railroads. They met secretly at Wormley's Hotel in Washington to forge a compromise with aid to internal improvements: bridges, canals and railroads wanted by the South.

Under Woodward's compromise theory, Southern Democrats acknowledged Hayes as president by ending their filibuster of the election, on the understanding that Republicans would meet certain demands. Woodward identified five points of compromise by the federal government during the Hayes administration:

1. The removal of all remaining U.S. military forces from the former Confederate states. At the time, U.S. troops remained only in Louisiana, South Carolina, and Florida, but the Compromise completed their withdrawal from the region;
2. The appointment of at least one Southern Democrat to Hayes' cabinet. David M. Key of Tennessee was appointed as Postmaster General;
3. The construction of another transcontinental railroad using the Texas and Pacific in the South, part of the "Scott Plan", proposed by Thomas A. Scott of the Pennsylvania Railroad, who initiated negotiations resulting in the final compromise;
4. Legislation to industrialize the South and restore its economy following the Civil War and Reconstruction; and
5. The right to deal with Black people without northern interference.

Whether by informal deal or simply reassurances already in line with Hayes's announced plans, talks with Southern Democrats satisfied the worries of many. This prevented a congressional filibuster that had threatened to extend resolution of the election dispute beyond Inauguration Day 1877.

=== Criticism of Woodward's theory ===
Some historians, such as Allan Peskin in Was There a Compromise of 1877? (1973), argue that both Hayes's election and the assurances offered to Southern Democrats to prevent a filibuster were not a compromise at all. Though Peskin admits that Woodward's interpretation had become almost universally accepted in the nearly quarter century since he had published it, he argues that three of Woodward's five conditions for compromise were not met, and those which were met were not made for the purpose of securing Hayes's legitimacy. Hayes had already announced prior to the election that he supported the restoration of "home rule", including the withdrawal of federal troops and at the time, it was not unusual nor unexpected for a president, especially one so narrowly elected, to select a cabinet member favored by the other party.

The remainder of the concessions, Peskin contends, were never made:

1. A southern transcontinental railroad was never built and federal legislation to industrialize the South was not passed. Peskin argues that no serious federal effort was made during the Hayes administration to fund such a railroad or provide other federal aid for improvements. An opposing interest group representing the Southern Pacific actually thwarted Scott's proposed Texas and Pacific scheme, and ultimately ran its own line to New Orleans.
2. The Republican Party did not abandon efforts to regulate race relations in the South until at least 1890, with the failure of the Lodge Bill.

Peskin also suggests that Northern Democrats, who gained little from Woodward's proposed terms, were more significant in quashing the filibuster than those from the South. For instance, Speaker of the House Samuel J. Randall was from Pennsylvania and was more interested in ensuring that the Radical state government in Louisiana was abandoned than in any southern railroad. Peskin argues that Tilden would have been unable to challenge the election successfully, and thus the abandonment of the filibuster by Randall was pragmatic recognition of limited bargaining power, rather than a quid pro quo.

Michael Les Benedict accepts the existence of an informal agreement but notes that the agreement itself had no legal effect, in contrast to the earlier legislative compromises of 1820, 1824, 1850 and 1861. In formal legal terms, the election of 1876 was not decided by negotiation, but by the official vote of Congress to accept the recommendations of the Electoral Commission. The reliance on the threat of a filibuster against the wishes of the Democratic leadership indicates that there were already sufficient votes to accept the commission's recommendations.

=== International recontextualization ===
Greg Downs, in The Mexicanization of American Politics: The United States' Transnational Path from Civil War to Stabilization (2012), emphasizes the broad opposition to instability and political violence in the post-Civil War United States in the context of the electoral dispute. Instead of a negotiated compromise between opposing factions, Downs frames the dispute in a transnational context of "state fragility" and "state stabilization" in a period when many Americans feared "Mexicanization" of politics, whereby force would be used to settle a presidential election, resulting in a chaotic spiral of violent reprisals which were associated with foreign intervention and foreign domination of the Mexican Republic.

Downs argues that "too often the 1876 election becomes in the historiography a site of fraud that outrages and also reinforces the centrality of electoral democracy to the nation's story instead of prompting deeper examination of the central role of violence in broadly defining what politics is." The prospect of delegitimization or dual presidencies during a period of relative fragility in an international context was feared to "Mexicanize" the United States. Downs credits this fear, combined with lobbying pressure along the same lines from prominent Tilden supporters such as Charles Francis Adams Sr. and Alexander Stephens, as an explanation for the ultimate abandonment of the Tilden cause.

== Aftermath ==
In any case, Reconstruction ended. The dominance of the Democratic Party in the South was cemented with the ascent of the "Redeemer" governments that displaced the Republican governments. After 1877, support for white supremacy generally caused whites to vote for Democrats and the region became known as the "Solid South". Until the end of the 19th century, Black Republicans continued to elect numerous candidates to local office, although Democrats controlled most state representative and statewide seats, except for a brief period, roughly between 1877 and 1900, during which some fusion governments and candidates – supported both by Republicans and by Populists or another third party – were occasionally elected to state-level offices, particularly in North Carolina prior to the Wilmington massacre of 1898.

President Harry Truman, a member of the Democratic Party who formerly served as a senator from the upper-South (Missouri), in 1948 made the first presidentially-proposed Civil Rights Act in America, which included anti-lynching, voter rights, and elimination of segregation. "No political act since the Compromise of 1877," argued biographer Taylor Branch, "so profoundly influenced race relations; in a sense it was a repeal of 1877."

== Bibliography ==
- Benedict, Michael Les. "Southern Democrats in the Crisis of 1876–1877: A Reconsideration of Reunion and Reaction." Journal of Southern History (1980): 489–524. JSTOR 2207200
- Clendenen, Clarence C. (October 1969). "President Hayes' "Withdrawal" of the Troops: An Enduring Myth". The South Carolina Historical Magazine. 70 (4): 240–250.
- DeSantis, Vincent P. "Rutherford B. Hayes and the Removal of the Troops and the End of Reconstruction" in Region, Race and Reconstruction edited by Morgan Kousser and James McPherson. (Oxford University Press, 1982) pp. 417–50.
- Downs, Gregory P. (2012). "The Mexicanization of American Politics: The United States' Transnational Path from Civil War to Stabilization". The American Historical Review. 117 (2): 387–409. doi:10.1086/ahr.117.2.387.
- Frantz, Edward O. The Door of Hope: Republican Presidents and the First Southern Strategy, 1877–1933 (University Press of Florida. 2011)
- Huntzicker, William E. "Thomas Nast, Harper's Weekly, and the Election of 1876." in After The War (Routledge, 2017) pp. 53–68.
- Palen, Marc‐William. "Election of 1876/Compromise of 1877." in A Companion to the Reconstruction Presidents 1865–1881 (2014): 415–430.
- Peskin, Allan (1973). "Was There a Compromise of 1877". The Journal of American History. 60 (1): 63–75. doi:10.2307/2936329. ISSN 1936-0967. JSTOR 2936329.
- Polakoff, Keith Ian. The Politics of Inertia: The Election of 1876 and the End of Reconstruction (1973)
- Riddleberger, Patrick W. (1960). "The Radicals' Abandonment of the Negro During Reconstruction". The Journal of Negro History. 45 (2): 88–102. doi:10.2307/2716572. JSTOR 2716572. S2CID 150103947.
- Simpson, Brooks D. "Ulysses S. Grant and the Electoral Crisis of 1876–1877," Hayes Historical Journal (1992) 11#2 pp 5–22.
- Skidmore, Max J. "Rutherford B. Hayes." in Maligned Presidents: The Late 19th Century (2014): 50–62.
- Woodward, C. Vann (1951). Reunion and Reaction: The Compromise of 1877 and the End of Reconstruction. Oxford University Press. ISBN 978-0-19-972785-8.
- Zuckerwise, Lena. " 'There Can Be No Loser': White Supremacy and the Cruelty of Compromise." American Political Thought 5.3 (2016): 467–493. online
