= Nancy Farriss =

American historian

- Born: May 23, 1938 (age 88)
- Title: Professor emerita
- Awards: Beveridge Award

Academic background
- Education: Barnard College
- Alma mater: University College London

Academic work
- Discipline: History
- Sub-discipline: Colonial history of Mexico
- Institutions: University of Pennsylvania
- Notable works: Maya society under colonial rule: The collective enterprise of survival

Nancy Marguerite Farriss (born May 23, 1938) is an American historian who is professor emerita at the University of Pennsylvania.

== Life ==
Nancy Marguerite Farriss was born on May 23, 1938. She specializes in the colonial history of Mexico, and completed her doctorate from University College London in 1965, after she earned a B.A. at Barnard College. This was followed by brief posts at the University of the West Indies, Jamaica and the College of William and Mary in Williamsburg, VA. In 1971 she was appointed as Associate Professor of History at the University of Pennsylvania and continued there for the rest of her career, becoming Annenberg Professor of History in 1990. She is now professor emerita.

== Awards ==
- 1983 Guggenheim Fellowship
- 1985 Beveridge Award for Maya society under colonial rule: The collective enterprise of survival
- 1986 MacArthur Fellows Program

== Works ==
- Ecclesiastical Immunity in New Spain 1760–1815 1965
- Crown and Clergy in Colonial Mexico, 1759–1821: the Crisis of Ecclesiastical Privilege, Athlone Press, 1968
- Maya Society Under Colonial Rule: the Collective Enterprise of Survival. Princeton University Press. 1984. ISBN 978-0-691-10158-3. "Nancy Farriss."
