= Alan Knight (historian) =

British historian

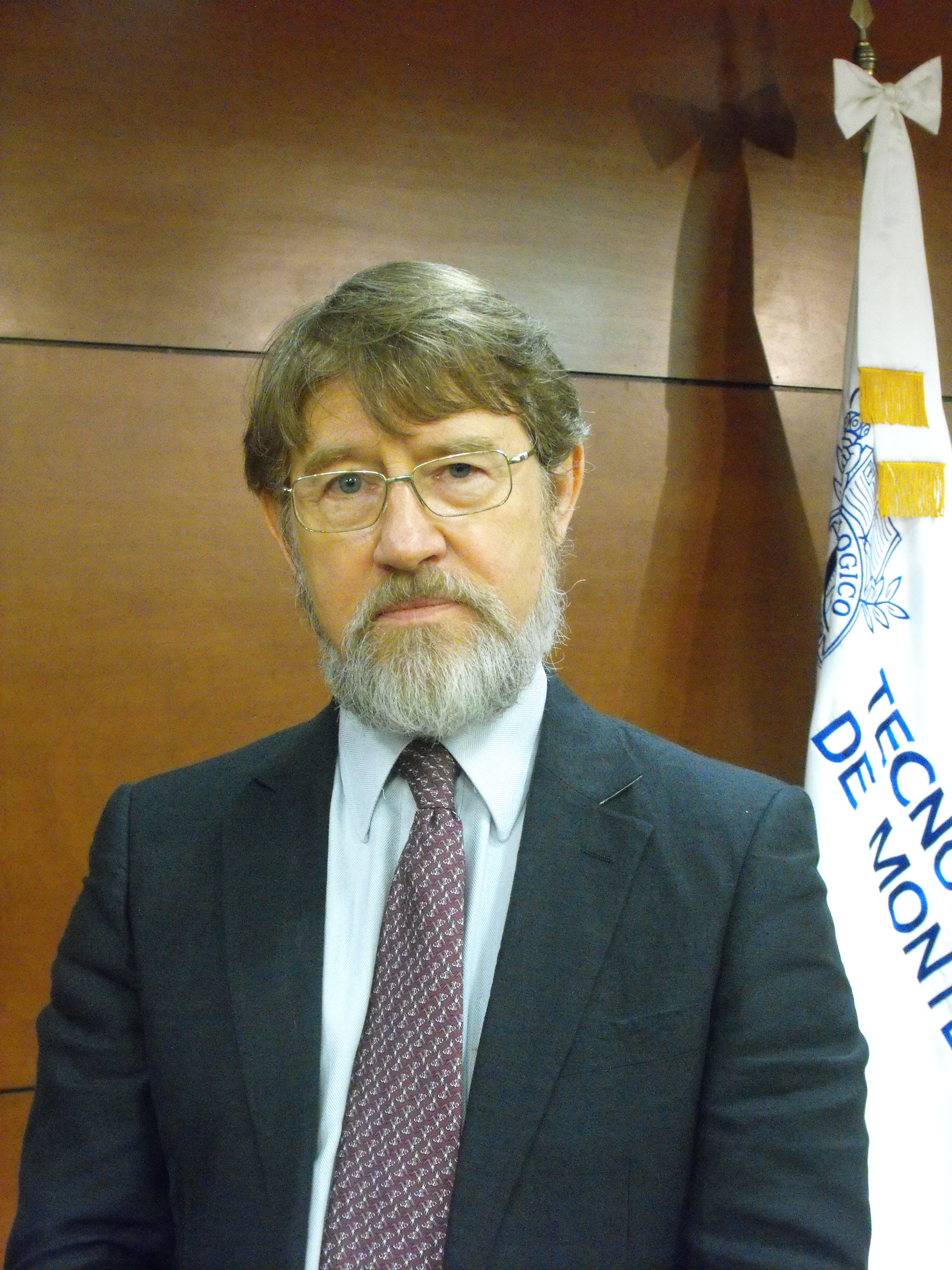
- Born: 6 November 1946 (age 80); London, England
- Citizenship: British
- Education: Balliol College, Oxford
- Children: 3
- Awards: Albert Beveridge Prize, Bolton Prize and Order of the Aztec Eagle
- Scientific career
- Workplaces: University of Essex; University of Texas at Austin; St Antony's College, Oxford

Alan Sydney Knight (born 6 November 1946) is a professor and researcher of Latin American history and former professor at the University of Oxford in England. His work has been recognised with several awards, including the Order of the Aztec Eagle from the Mexican government.

== Biography ==
Knight did his undergraduate, graduate and post-doctoral work all at Oxford University, describing his college experience as lacking women and being in a fortress-like environment, regularly conversing in Latin. He began specialising in Latin American history because of the Cuban Revolution of Fidel Castro, which concerned the British government enough to sponsor several new Latin American centres including one at Oxford.

Before his return to his alma mater, Knight taught at the University of Essex from 1973 to 1985 and then at the University of Texas at Austin, where he held the C.B. Smith Chair. In 1986 he was also a visiting fellow at the Center for US-Mexican Studies at the University of California, San Diego. He became a professor of Latin American history at Oxford in 1992 and has taught mostly at the masters level with some select courses at the undergraduate level until his retirement in 2013. He has been the director of the Latin American Centre and/or the director of Graduate Studies several times at Oxford and is a fellow of St Antony's College at the same institution.

Most of his teaching and research work relates to modern Mexican history, but he also teaches the history of other Latin American countries. His research work stresses the role of the agrarian society, state building, revolutionary upheavals, populism and democracy. He believes that Mexico is of "supreme importance" not just in terms of Latin America but globally.

In 1986 he was awarded the Albert Beveridge Prize and in 1987 the Bolton Prize from the Conference on Latin American History for his two-volume work on the Mexican Revolution. In 2009, Knight received the Order of the Aztec Eagle for his research work from the Mexican government. In 2012, he received an honorary doctorate from the Universidad Veracruzana in Mexico.

== Major publications ==
=== Books ===
- Revolución, Democracia y Populismo en América Latina (Santiago. 2005) (Wilson)
- (ed.) Caciquismo in Twentieth-century Mexico. (London, 2005) 3-48pp.
- Mexico: from the Beginning to the Spanish Conquest (Cambridge, 2002)
- Mexico: The Colonial Era (Cambridge, 2002)
- (with J.C. Brown), The Mexican Petroleum Industry in the Twentieth Century. (Austin, 1992)
- The Mexican Revolution, v. 1. Porfirians, Liberals and Peasants and v. 2, Counter-revolution and Reconstruction. (Cambridge, 1986)
- US-Mexican Relations, 1910–1940: An Interpretation. (San Diego, 1987)
- Chapter on Mexico, 1930–1946, in The Cambridge History of Latin America (Vol. VII, 1990)

=== Others ===
- Caciquismo in Twentieth-century Mexico (Institute for the Study of the Americas: London, 2005), 3–48
- Mexico Since Independence (Cambridge, 2004)
- The Domestic Dynamics of the Mexican and Bolivian Revolutions, in Proclaiming Revolution: The Bolivian Revolution in Comparative Perspective (London, 2003), 54–90
- Mexico: The Colonial Era (Cambridge, 2002), xix + 353
- Subalterns, Signifiers and Statistics: Perspectives on Mexican Historiography. Latin American Research Review 37 no.2 (2002), 136–58
- Tres crisis de fin de siglo en M, in Crisis, reform y revolución (Mexico City, 2002), 87–128
- The Weight of the State in Modern Mexico, in Studies in the Formation of the Nation State in Latin America (London, 2002), 212–253
- Democratic and Revolutionary Traditions in Latin America. Bulletin of Latin American Research 20(2) (2001), 147–86
- Britain and Latin America, 1800–1914, in The Oxford History of the British Empire, Volume 3, The nineteenth century (Oxford, 1999), 122–145
- Latin America, in The Oxford History of the Twentieth Century (Oxford, 1998), 277–291
- Populism and Neo-Populism in Latin America, especially Mexico. Journal of Latin American Studies 30 (1998), 223–248
- Habitus and Homicide: Political Culture in Revolutionary Mexico, in Citizens of the Pyramid: Essays on Mexican Political Culture (1997), 107–130
