= Stanley I. Kutler =

American historian (1934–2015)

- Born: Stanley Ira Kutler; August 10, 1934; Cleveland, Ohio, United States
- Died: April 7, 2015 (aged 80); Fitchburg, Wisconsin, United States
- Education: Bowling Green State University; Ohio State University
- Occupations: Historian, Professor
- Spouse: Sandra J. Sachs

Stanley Ira Kutler (August 10, 1934 – April 7, 2015) was an American historian, best known for his lawsuit against the National Archives and Richard Nixon that won the release of tape recordings Nixon made during his White House years, particularly those in relation to the Watergate scandal.

== Early life and education ==
Kutler was born on August 10, 1934 in Cleveland, Ohio, the son of Robert (a printer) and Zelda (Coffman) Kutler. He attended Bowling Green State University (B.A., 1956) and Ohio State University (Ph.D., 1960). He was also a William Green fellow at Ohio State University, 1959-1960.

== Academic career ==
He was an instructor in history at Pennsylvania State University (1960–1962) and then taught at San Diego State University (assistant professor 1962–1964); In 1964, he was hired in the Department of History at the University of Wisconsin—Madison associate professor 1964-1970, professor of history 1970–1994 and thereafter as professor emeritus).

Kutler's book Abuse of Power: The New Nixon Tapes (Free Press, 1997) stemmed from his successful lawsuit against the National Archives and Nixon to force the release of the long-suppressed audio recordings of many conversations that Nixon had secretly recorded during his time in the White House. In 2009, Kutler was accused of errors in editing and transcribing the tapes, which resulted in White House counsel John Dean being portrayed in a more favorable light than was warranted. Kutler denied the charges. In 2013, the final chronological installment containing 340 hours of those conversations was posted online by the National Archives and Records Administration.

He has written widely in a number of fields of American history, concentrating on American constitutional history and the twentieth century. His earliest book was Judicial Power and Reconstruction Politics (University of Chicago Press, 1968). His other major books include The Wars of Watergate (Knopf, 1990); The American Inquisition (Hill & Wang, 1982), winner of the Silver Gavel Award, American Bar Association, 1983; Privilege and Creative Destruction: The Charles River Bridge Case (Norton, 1978; revised edition, 1989). He has authored or edited more than half a dozen textbooks in various fields of American history. His scholarly articles have appeared in leading history and legal periodicals. Prominent among his published works are editing the new edition of the Dictionary of American History, a ten-volume work (Scribner's 2002), which was awarded the American Library Association Best Reference Book Award. He also edited the four-volume Encyclopedia of Twentieth-Century America (Scribner's, 1995), awarded the prize for the best reference work by the Association of Book Publishers, and The Encyclopedia of the Vietnam War (Scribner's, 1995).

Kutler founded Reviews in American History, he also wrote op-ed pieces and reviews for many publications and appeared as an occasional commentator on National Public Radio, as well as Today, Nightline, and many other television programs. He also worked as a consultant on a number of film projects, including historical advisor for the Emmy-winning BBC documentary Watergate, and he was advisor for the Showtime film The Day Ronald Reagan Was Shot.

=== Honors ===
Kutler has been a Guggenheim Fellow, holder of the Garibaldi Chair in Political Science, University of Bologna, 1991, Distinguished Exchange Scholar (National Science Foundation) for China in 1982, and Fulbright 40th Anniversary Distinguished Lecturer, Peru, in 1987, Bicentennial Professor, Tel Aviv University, Israel, in 1984, and Fulbright Lecturer, Japan, 1977.

== Personal ==
Kutler married Sandra J. Sachs in 1956, and they had four children. In 2015, he died in Fitchburg, Wisconsin aged 80. He was survived by his wife, his three children and seven grandchildren.

== Bibliography ==
- Kutler, Stanley I. (1968). Judicial Power and Reconstruction Politics. Chicago: University of Chicago Press. LCCN 68016702. OCLC 169927.
- Kutle, Stanley I. (1982). The American Inquisition: Justice and Injustice in the Cold War. New York City: Hill & Wang. ISBN 978-0-8090-0157-6. LCCN 82011976. OCLC 8668293.
- Kutler, Stanley I. (1990). The Wars of Watergate: The Last Crisis of Richard Nixon. New York City: Knopf. ISBN 978-0-394-56234-6. LCCN 89043351. OCLC 21042223.
- Kutler, Stanley I. (1990). Privilege and Creative Destruction: The Charles River Bridge Case. Baltimore: Johns Hopkins University Press. ISBN 978-0-8018-3983-2. LCCN 89038367. OCLC 1034647095.
- Kutler, Stanley I. (1996). Encyclopedia of the Vietnam War. New York City: Charles Scribner's Sons. ISBN 978-0-13-276932-7. LCCN 95020940. OCLC 1083045859.
- Kutler, Stanley I. (1997). Abuse of Power: The New Nixon Tapes. New York City: Free Press. ISBN 978-0-684-84127-4. LCCN 97032096. OCLC 37755068.
