= Linda Grant DePauw =

American historian, educator and writer

Linda Grant DePauw (born January 19, 1940) is an American modern historian, retired university teacher, non-fiction author and journal editor, who is a pioneer in women's research in the United States. She received the Beveridge Award in 1964, was shortlisted for the American Book Awards in 1983, and became part of a book published by the National Women's Hall of Fame in 1998.

== Early life ==
Linda Grant was born in New York City, in 1940. She is the daughter of Phillip Grant and Ruth (Marks) Grant. She received her bachelor's degree in history education at Swarthmore College in 1961. In 1964, she graduated from Johns Hopkins University with a Ph.D.

== Career ==
After marriage, her surname became "Grant DePauw".

In 1964/65, Grant DePauw worked as Assistant Professor at the Department of History at George Mason University. In 1964, she received the Albert J. Beveridge Award for her doctoral thesis "The Eleventh Pillar: New York State and the Federal Constitution".

In 1965–66, she worked as technical assistant at the National Archives and Records Administration (NARA) and, from 1966 to 1969, an assistant history professor at George Washington University (GWU). In 1969–1975, she taught there as an associate professor and from 1975 until her retirement in 1999 as a full professor of American history. She is now Professor Emeritus of History at GWU.

Grant DePauw was a pioneer in women's studies research in the United States, describing the role of women in the American Revolution and the American Civil War. In 2007, she wrote the book about the war effort of Molly Pitcher at the Battle of Monmouth (1778). In 1983, she founded in New York, "The Minerva Center" (an institution for the study of women in the military), serving as its long-time president and editing the Minerva Journal of Women and War. She is a longtime member of the American Historical Association (AHA).

== Awards and honors ==
- 1964, Beveridge Award
- 1983, shortlisted, The American Book Awards
- 1998, National Women's Hall of Fame

== Works ==
- The Eleventh Pillar. New York State and the Federal Constitution. (doctoral dissertation), 1964
- Four traditions. Women of New York during the American Revolution. 1974
- Founding Mothers. Women of America in the Revolutionary Era. Erstausgabe 1975
- mit Conover Hunt, Miriam Schneidr: Remember the Ladies. Women in America 1750–1815. Erstausgabe 1975
- Fortunes of War. New Jersey Women and the American Revolution. (New Jersey's Revolutionary Experience). vol. 26 (1978)
- Seafaring Women. 1982
- Baptism of Fire. Minerva Center 1993
- Battle Cries and Lullabies. Women in War from Prehistory to the Present. Norman. University of Oklahoma Press 1998
- Sea Changes. 2003
- In Search of Molly Pitcher. 2007
