= Ann Douglas (historian) =

American historian

- Born: 1942 (age 83–84)
- Awards: Guggenheim Fellowship (1993); Beveridge Award (1995); Merle Curti Award (1997)

Academic background
- Education: Harvard University (BA, PhD); University of Oxford (BPhil)

Academic work
- Discipline: Intellectual history
- Institutions: Princeton University; Columbia University

Ann Douglas (born 1942) is an American literary historian who specializes in intellectual history. She is the Parr Professor Emerita of English and Comparative Literature at Columbia University.

== Biography ==
Douglas attended Milton Academy, received her B.A. and Ph.D. from Harvard University and B.Phil. from the University of Oxford. She taught at Princeton University from 1970 to 1974 and was the first woman to teach in Princeton's English department and the first woman to be offered assistant professorship at Harvard. She then joined Columbia's faculty. Her research interests include 20th-century American intellectual and cultural history. She is regarded as one of America's foremost cultural historians.

Douglas received two fellowships from the National Humanities Center in 1978 and 1979 after publishing The Feminization of American Culture (1977), controversial for its criticism of what she saw as the age's feminine sensibilities, and 1993-1994 and a Guggenheim Fellowship in 1993. She was the recipient of the Merle Curti Award in 1997 and the 1995 Beveridge Award for the book from the Organization of American Historians for her book Terrible Honesty: Mongrel Manhattan in the 1920s. She was named a fellow of the American Academy of Arts and Sciences in 2002.

Douglas was married to fellow historian Peter H. Wood before divorcing.
