= Hill & Wang =

American book publishing company

- Parent company: Farrar, Straus and Giroux
- Founded: 1956
- Founder: Lawrence Hill and Arthur Wang
- Country of origin: U.S.
- Headquarters location: 19 Union Square West, New York City
- Publication types: Books
- Official website: Hill & Wang

Hill & Wang is an American book publishing company focused on American history, world history, and politics. It is a division of Farrar, Straus and Giroux.

Hill & Wang was founded as an independent publishing house in 1956 by Arthur W. Wang (1918–2005) and Lawrence Hill (1912–1988), who were both working at A. A. Wyn. They bought backlist books from Wyn and started Dramabooks, publishing plays in trade paperback, then a new format. The series included Jean Cocteau, Arthur L. Kopit and Lanford Wilson. In 1959, Arthur Wang acquired Elie Wiesel's Holocaust memoir, Night, which had been turned down by several English-language publishers, publishing it in 1960. They continued to build the Hill & Wang list to include such authors as Roland Barthes, Langston Hughes, and American historians Stanley Kutler and William Cronon.

In 1971, the two sold Hill & Wang to Farrar, Straus and Giroux, and the imprint continues to be recognized for its high quality nonfiction. More recently, it has published authors such as Cass Sunstein, Philip Gura, John Allen Paulos, Melvyn Leffler, Thomas Bender, William Poundstone, Woody Holton, and Eric Rauchway.

The imprint also launched a graphic line, "Novel Graphics," when it published a graphic adaptation of the 9/11 Commission Report by Sid Jacobson and Ernie Colón. It has since published several graphic biographies and works of graphic journalism, and a graphic adaptation of the United States Constitution.

== Notable authors ==
- Roland Barthes, Numerous works in translation.
- Elizabeth A. Fenn, Encounters at the Heart of the World, Hill & Wang, 2014. Winner of Pulitzer Prize for History.
- Philip Gura, American Transcendentalism (Hill & Wang, 2007). Nominee for the National Book Critics Circle Award
- Woody Holton, Unruly Americans and the Origins of the Constitution (Hill & Wang, 2007). Finalist for the National Book Award
- Jack London, The Iron Heel (Hill & Wang, 1957, 1966, 1967, 1968, 1969).
- William Pfaff, Barbarian Sentiments: How the American Century Ends (Hill & Wang, 1989). Finalist for the National Book Award
- Elie Wiesel, Night (Hill & Wang, 1960, 2006).
