= Peter H. Wood =

American historian (born 1943)

- Born: 1943 (age 82–83); St. Louis, Missouri, USA
- Education: Harvard University
- Occupations: Historian, author, educator
- Spouse(s): Ann Douglas (m. 1965, divorced) Elizabeth A. Fenn (m. 1999)
- Writing career
- Genre: American history
- Subjects: Black diaspora, African American history
- Notable work: Black Majority (1974)

Peter Hutchins Wood (born 1943 in St. Louis, Missouri) is an American historian and author of Black Majority: Negroes in Colonial South Carolina from 1670 through the Stono Rebellion (1974). It is one of the most influential books on the history of the American South of the past 50 years. A former professor at Duke University in North Carolina, Wood is an adjunct professor in the History Department at the University of Colorado Boulder, where his wife, Elizabeth A. Fenn is a professor emerita in the History Department.

== Early life and education ==
The son of Barry Wood and Mary Lee Wood, Peter H. Wood was educated at the Gilman School in Baltimore, Maryland, and Harvard University. He studied at Oxford University as a Rhodes Scholar and returned to Harvard for a Ph.D. He played lacrosse while an undergraduate at Harvard and later at Oxford.

Wood wrote the original version of Black Majority: Negroes in Colonial South Carolina from 1670 through the Stono Rebellion as his Ph.D. dissertation, which won the Albert J. Beveridge Award of the American Historical Association. Published in 1974, it was part of major revisions in the ways historians studied African-American history and American slavery in particular.

== African rice thesis ==
In Black Majority: Negroes in Colonial South Carolina from 1670 through the Stono Rebellion (1974), Wood showed that South Carolina rice planters during the Colonial Era enslaved Africans specifically from the "Rice Coast" of West Africa because of their expertise in rice cultivation and its technology. The African region stretched between what is now Senegal and Gambia in the north to Sierra Leone and Liberia in the south. African farmers in that region had been growing indigenous African rice for thousands of years and were experts in cultivating the difficult crop. They were also familiar with Asian rice, having obtained it via the trans-Saharan trade or through contact with early Portuguese shippers. Wood demonstrated that Africans from the Rice Coast brought the knowledge and technical skills to develop extensive cultivation that made rice one of the most lucrative industries in early America. They knew how to design and build the major earthworks: dams and irrigation systems for flooding and draining fields, that supported rice culture, as well as techniques for cultivation, harvesting and processing.

By proving that Africans contributed their sophisticated knowledge and skills to the building of America and not just their physical labor, Wood set a new tone in Southern historiography and opened an area of study. His book has been in print since it was first published in 1973. Wood's Black Majority gave rise to a tradition of scholarship on the African roots of rice cultivation in colonial America. It influenced the writings of other scholars, including Daniel C. Littlefield (Rice and Slaves: Ethnicity and the Slave Trade in Colonial South Carolina), Charles Joyner (Down by the Riverside: A South Carolina Slave Community), Amelia Wallace Vernon (African Americans at Mars Bluff, South Carolina), Julia Floyd Smith (Slavery and Rice Culture in Low Country Georgia), Judith A. Carney (Black Rice: The African Origins of Rice Cultivation in the Americas), and Edda Fields-Black (Deep Roots: Rice Farmers in West Africa and the American Diaspora).

In addition, Wood's insights contributed to historians who have examined the continuities between African cultures and those the people created in different regions of the present-day United States. It also influenced the work of the public historian Joseph Opala, who organized a series of notable "homecomings" to Sierra Leone for Gullah people.

== Gullah origins ==
Wood in Black Majority (1974) explained why the Gullah people have preserved so much more of their African cultural heritage than other black communities in the U.S. The slave ships coming from Africa brought mosquitos which introduced malaria and yellow fever to the semi-tropical "low country" region bordering the South Carolina coast. In addition, some of the surviving slaves likely carried these endemic diseases. The mosquitoes bred in the conditions of the rice fields, and as the rice industry expanded, so did the diseases they carried. Wood showed that the Africans were more resistant to these tropical fevers, because they were endemic in their homeland. White colonists avoided the low country because of disease. Although planters maintained plantations on the Sea Islands, they preferred to live in the cities of Charleston or Savannah.

Because of the diseases and the expansion of large rice and indigo plantations, with their need for many laborers, South Carolina had a "black majority" by about 1708. In addition, the continuing importation of slaves from the Rice Coast meant that the people were renewed from specific tribal cultures, rather than being mixed. This demographic environment is what enabled Africans in the low country to retain more of their cultural heritage than slaves elsewhere in North America. In addition, the slaves in the low country, and especially plantations of the Sea Islands, had much less contact with whites than did those in areas such as Virginia or North Carolina, where whites were in the majority. Before Wood conceived his "black majority" argument, the origin of Gullah culture was not well understood.

In Virginia and North Carolina, by contrast, many slaves were held in small numbers by individual families on subsistence farms. Even those held in larger numbers on plantations experienced change as crops were shifted from tobacco to mixed farming. This increased their interaction with whites.

Professor Wood continued to write about Africans in colonial America. He teaches history at Duke University in Durham, North Carolina.

== Personal ==
Wood married Ann Douglas in September 1965. They divorced, and Wood married Elizabeth A. Fenn in 1999.

== Books and awards ==
- 1975, Black Majority was nominated for a National Book Award
- 1984, James Harvey Robinson Prize of the American Historical Association
- 1999, Symposium, 25th anniversary of publication of Black Majority, South Carolina Department of Archives and History

Works

- Winslow Homer's Images of Blacks: The Civil War and Reconstruction Years, coauthor with Karen C.C. Dalton (1988)
- Strange New Land: Africans in Colonial America (2002)
- With Elizabeth A. Fenn, Part I: "Natives and Newcomers: North Carolina before 1770", in Joe A. Mobley, ed., The Way We Lived in North Carolina (2003)
- Weathering the Storm: Inside Winslow Homer’s Gulf Stream (2004)
- Contributor to Created Equal: A Social and Political History of the United States (2004)
- Near Andersonville: Winslow Homer's Civil War (2010)
