= Encounters at the Heart of the World =

2014 book by Elizabeth A. Fenn

Encounters at the Heart of the World: A History of the Mandan People
- First edition
- Author: Elizabeth A. Fenn
- Language: English
- Subjects: Mandan; colonialism; disease
- Genre: Indigenous History
- Published: 2014
- Publisher: Hill and Wang
- Publication place: United States
- Pages: 480
- Awards: Pulitzer Prize for History
- ISBN: 978-0-374-71107-8

Encounters at the Heart of the World: A History of the Mandan People is a Pulitzer Prize–winning non-fiction history book by American historian Elizabeth A. Fenn about the Mandan people, a Native American tribe located in what is now North Dakota. It was published in 2014 by Hill and Wang. The book draws on a wide array of sources, including demographic, ethnographic, archaeological, epidemiological, and climatological research and records, as well as Fenn's own travels through the region.

== Contents ==
The title – and a central theme – of the book is drawn from the fact that the Mandan resided in their traditional territory near to the geographical center of the North American continent, which coincided with Mandan creation stories that positioned the Mandan at the center of the world. This is also, significantly, where the Heart River joins the Missouri. Fenn documents how this helped put the Mandan in a central political and economic position in the pre-contact world, despite the fact that the Mandan have typically entered the historical record only for their brief meeting with the Lewis and Clark Expedition in the winter of 1804–05, due largely to George Catlin's sketches and paintings. In the face of such a fleeting historical image, Fenn reconstructs the history of a sedentary and influential society that farmed extensively and was well positioned to control trading.

Fenn charts the development of Mandan society over centuries, including the various challenges that often defined the long pre-contact period, such as droughts, climatic changes, and pests. She argues that the Mandan likely reached a peak population of approximately 12,000 by the year 1500, and that by 1750 their territory had become "one of the most dynamic centers of interaction in North America." Fenn emphasizes in particular the role of corn – and agricultural innovations that enabled the Mandan to store large surpluses of corn – to Mandan society, explaining that "for outsiders and plains denizens alike, it was the defining characteristic of the Mandans and their towns." Their agricultural prowess and geographic location made the Mandan a key confluence point in North American trading, which was largely oriented on a "north/south" axis, reaching from as far as Mexico in the south to Hudson Bay in the north.

As was the case with many Indigenous peoples, Fenn also charts how the impacts of European contact were felt by the Mandan long before direct contact was made, bringing new relationships and trading goods such as horses and guns, which served to bolster the Mandan position as a key trading center, as well as diseases, which ultimately undermined that position. Fenn traces the impacts of various epidemics of smallpox, whooping cough, and measles, which had a devastating impact, in some instances killing ninety percent of the Mandan population. In addition to diseases, the invasion of Brown rats into Mandan territory decimated stores of corn, creating malnutrition crises for the Mandan that exacerbated the effects of epidemics. Fenn writes that when it came to smallpox in particular, "the very traits that made the Mandans so prominent worked against them. Their long-distance contacts ensured that the virus reached their towns, possibly again and again; once it did, Mandan numbers and population density made transmission highly likely."

Although Fenn thus charts the decline of the Mandan population to a nadir of only a few hundred in the mid-nineteenth century, when they were forced to abandon their remaining villages, she also documents a history of resilience up to the present day, as the Mandan continue to survive as a people. Fenn discusses the revival of the traditional Okipa ceremony as one mark of modern resilience.

== Awards and recognition ==
Encounters at the Heart of the World won the 2015 Pulitzer Prize for History. The book has been praised for its writing, with one historian, Richard White, hailing it as "part of a small renascence in historical writing."
