= Dylan C. Penningroth =

American historian

- Education: Yale University; Johns Hopkins University
- Occupation: Professor
- Writing career
- Notable awards: MacArthur Fellows Program
- Website: dylanpenningroth.com

Dylan C. Penningroth is an American historian and professor at the University of California, Berkeley. In 2012, he was the recipient of a MacArthur Fellows Program grant.

== Life ==
Penningroth received his Bachelor of Arts degree from Yale University in 1993 and his Masters (1996) and Ph.D. (2000) from Johns Hopkins University. His studies focus on elements of African American life under slavery and in the half-century following slavery's abolition.

== Works ==
- The Claims of Kinfolk: African American Property and Community in the Nineteenth-Century South. Univ of North Carolina Press. 2003. pp. 312–. ISBN 978-0-8078-5476-1.
- Edward E. Baptist; Stephanie M. H. Camp, eds. (2006). "My People, My People". New Studies in the History of American Slavery. University of Georgia Press. pp. 166–. ISBN 978-0-8203-2694-8.
- Before the Movement: The Hidden History of Black Civil Rights (2023). New York: W. W. Norton.

=== Awards ===
In 2024 The Law and Society Association honored Penningroth with the J. Willard Hurst Book Prize.
