= Like a Family =

Like a Family: The Making of a Southern Cotton Mill World
- First edition
- Author: Jacquelyn Dowd Hall, James Leloudis, Robert Korstad, Mary Murphy, Christopher B. Daly, Lu Ann Jones
- Language: English
- Subject: Labor history Social history
- Publisher: University of North Carolina Press
- Publication date: 1987; 2000 (rev. ed.)
- Publication place: United Kingdom
- Media type: Print (Hardback & Paperback)
- Pages: 544
- ISBN: 978-0-8078-4879-1
- OCLC: 43083379
- Dewey Decimal: 305.9/677 21
- LC Class: HD9077.A13 L55 2000

Like a Family: The Making of a Southern Cotton Mill World is a history of the cotton textile industry in the American South, especially the Piedmont region of the states of Virginia, North Carolina, South Carolina, Georgia, and Alabama. It was based in large part on an extensive body of oral history interviews conducted by the Southern Oral History Program at the University of North Carolina at Chapel Hill in the late 1970s and early 1980s as part of the Piedmont Industrialization Project.

The book won several awards after its publication in 1987, including the 1988 Albert J. Beveridge Award from the American Historical Association; the 1988 Philip Taft Labor History Book Award from the New York School of Industrial and Labor Relations, Cornell University; the 1988 Merle Curti History Award in American Social History (co-winner) from the Organization of American Historians; and an Honorable Mention Award for the 1988 John Hope Franklin Publication Prize from the American Studies Association.

In 2000, a paperback second edition was published that included a new afterword by the authors reflecting on the creation and reception of the book.
