= 1875 Ohio gubernatorial election =

- October 12, 1875
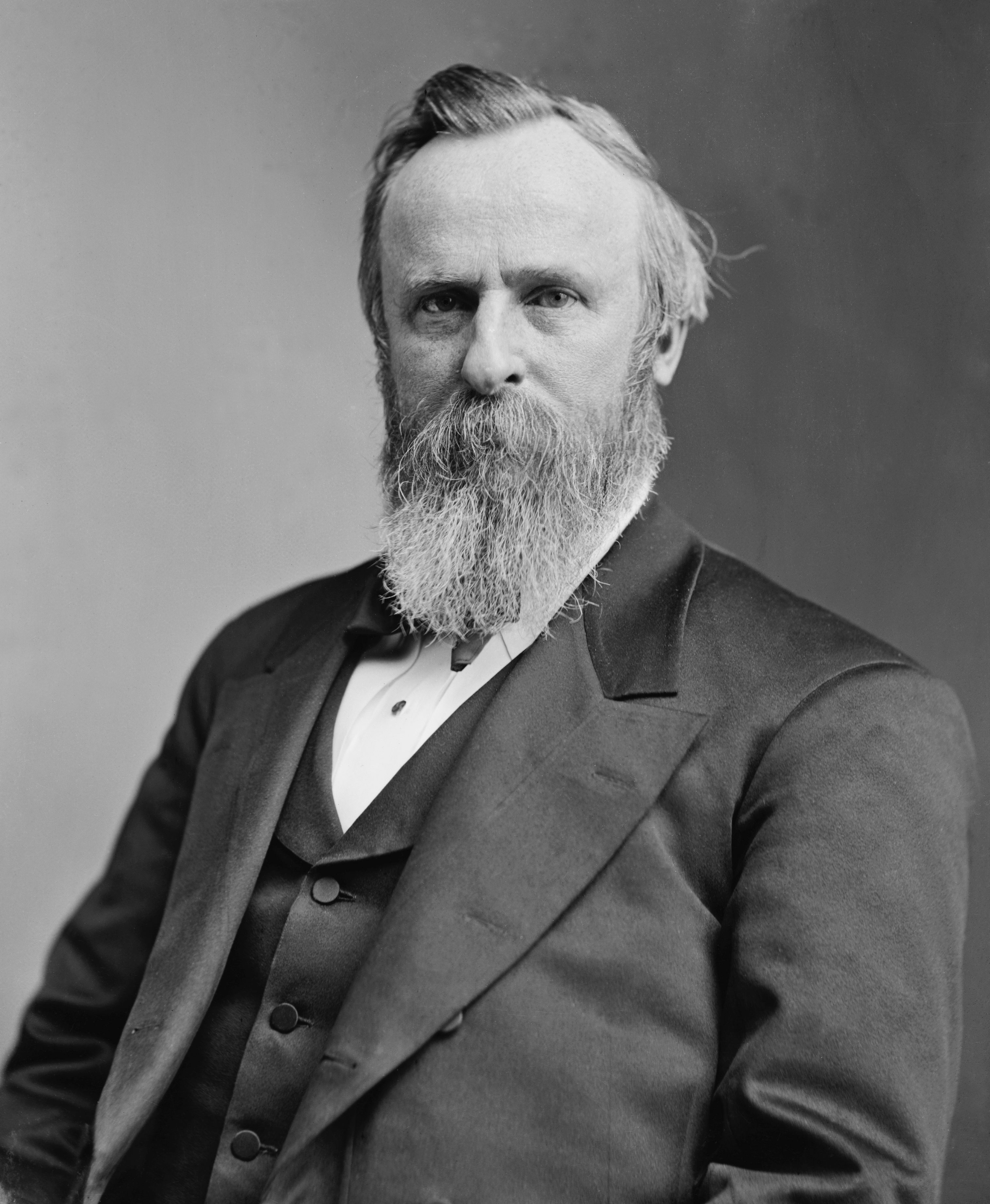

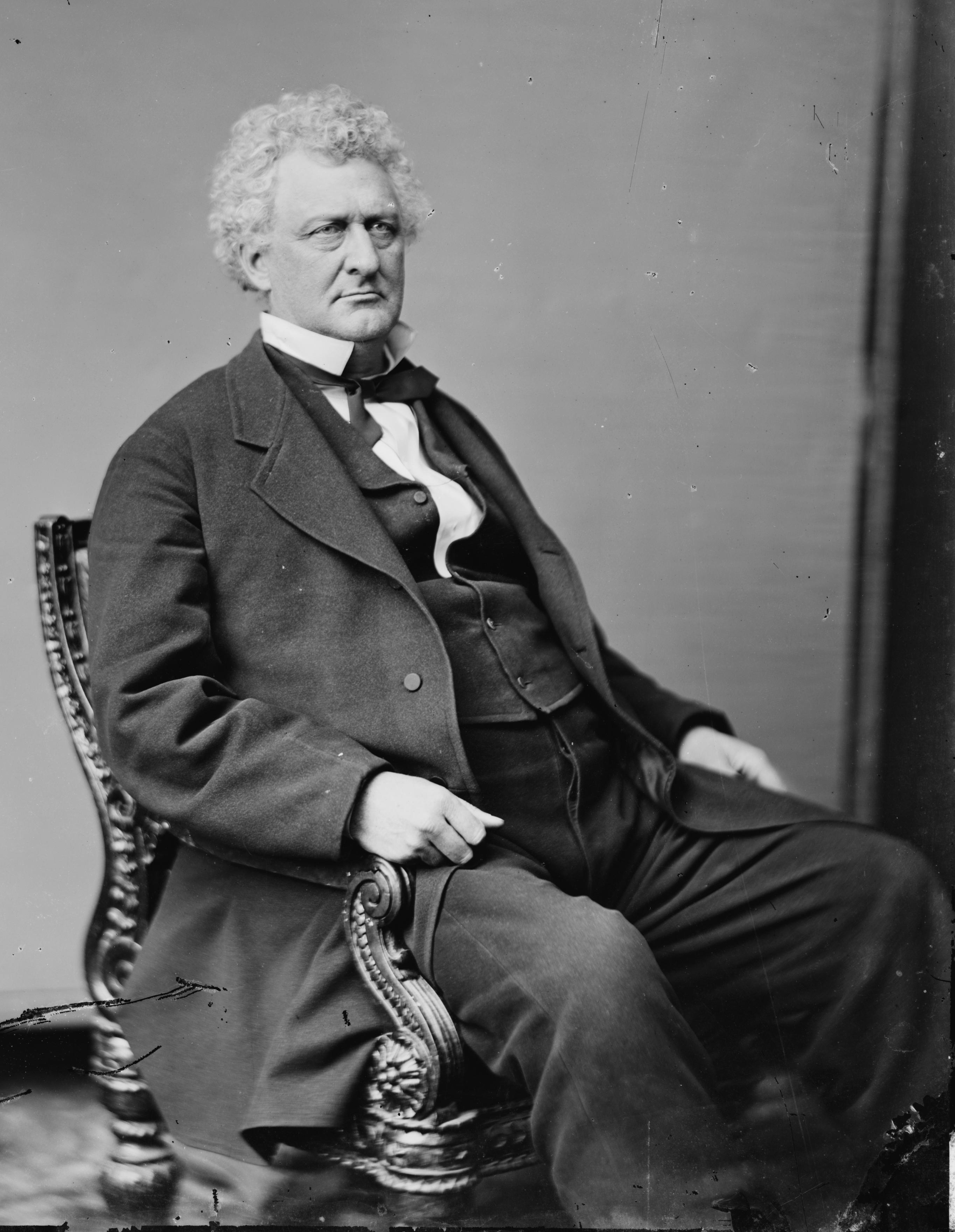
Nominee	Rutherford B. Hayes	William Allen
Party	Republican	Democratic
Popular vote	297,817	292,273
Percentage	50.25%	49.31%
- County results Hayes: 40–50% 50–60% 60–70% 70–80% Allen: 50–60% 60–70% 70–80%
Governor before election
William Allen
Democratic
Elected Governor
Rutherford B. Hayes
Republican

The 1875 Ohio gubernatorial election was held on October 12, 1875. Republican nominee Rutherford B. Hayes defeated Democratic incumbent William Allen with 50.25% of the vote. Hayes had previously served as Governor from 1868 to 1872, when he beat Allen's nephew Allen G. Thurman in his initial election.

== General election ==
=== Candidates ===
- William Allen, incumbent Governor (Democratic)
- Rutherford B. Hayes, former Governor and U.S. Representative from Cincinnati (Republican)
- Jay Odell (Prohibition)

=== Results ===
1875 Ohio gubernatorial election
Party	Candidate	Votes	%	±%
Republican	Rutherford B. Hayes	297,817	50.25%	
Democratic	William Allen (incumbent)	292,273	49.31%	
Prohibition	Jay Odell	2,593	0.44%	
Majority		5,544		
Turnout				
Republican gain from Democratic		Swing		
