= Clarence C. Clendenen =

American historian

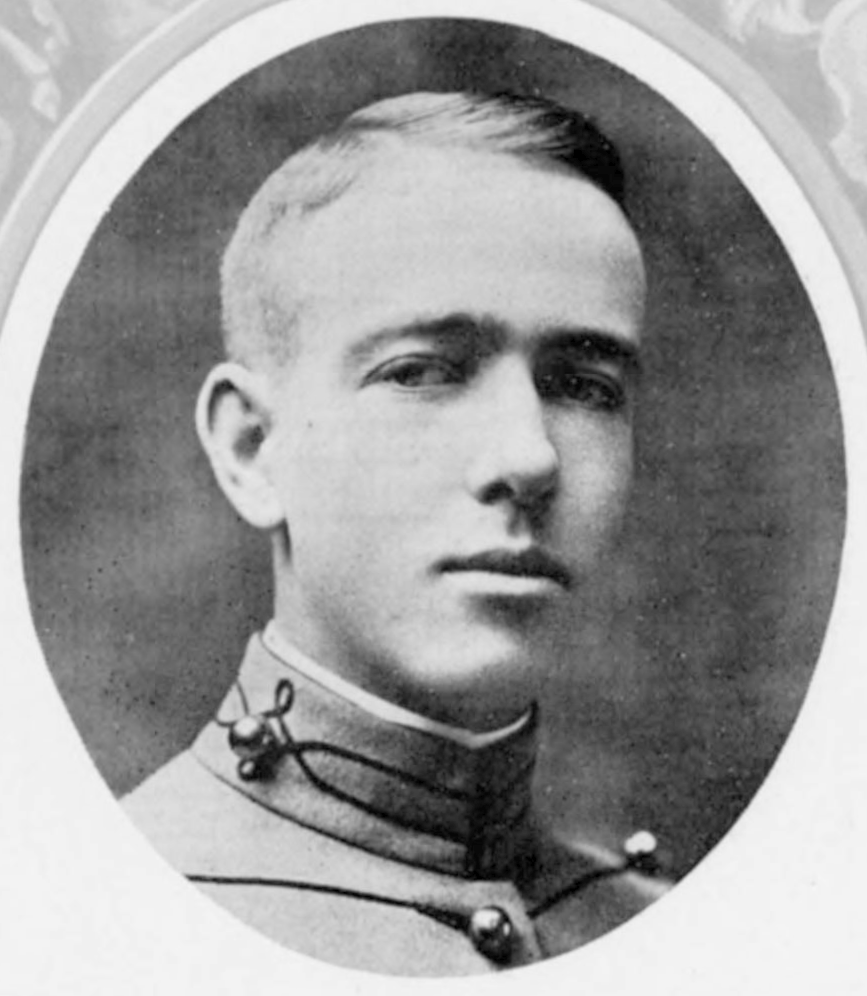
- At West Point in 1920
- Born: June 8, 1899; Colorado Springs, Colorado
- Died: November 19, 1977 (aged 78); Alhambra, California, U.S.
- Resting place: Golden Gate National Cemetery
- Education: Lincoln High School; United States Military Academy; Michigan State University; Stanford University
- Occupation: Historian
- Spouse: Elizabeth Cromwell Zeller
- Military career
- Branch: United States Army
- Service years: 1920-1954
- Rank: Colonel
- Unit: United States Cavalry

Clarence Clemens Clendenen (June 8, 1899 – November 19, 1977) was an American historian. He won the 1960 Beveridge Award from the American Historical Association for The United States and Pancho Villa.

== Biography ==
Clarence C. Clendenen was born in Colorado Springs, Colorado on June 8, 1899.

He graduated from the United States Military Academy in 1920. He served in the United States Army from 1920 to 1954, retiring at the rank of colonel.

He died in Alhambra, California on November 19, 1977, and was buried at Golden Gate National Cemetery.

== Published works ==
- The United States and Pancho Villa (1960).
- Blood On The Border (1969).
