= Sam Bass Warner Jr. =

American historian and author (1928–2023)

- Born: April 6, 1928; Boston, Massachusetts, U.S.
- Died: January 22, 2023 (aged 94); Needham, Massachusetts, U.S.
- Occupations: Historian, author
- Employer(s): MIT; Washington University; University of Michigan; Boston University; Brandeis University

Sam Bass Warner Jr. (April 6, 1928 – January 22, 2023) was an American historian and author. He taught at MIT School of Humanities, Arts, and Social Sciences, Arts and Sciences at Washington University in St. Louis, the University of Michigan College of Literature, Science, and the Arts, Boston University College of Arts and Sciences, and Brandeis University.

== Early life and death ==
Warner was born in Boston, Massachusetts, on April 6, 1928, and died in Needham, Massachusetts, on January 22, 2023, at the age of 94.

== Books ==
- Province of Reason
- Streetcar Suburbs: The Process of Growth in Boston, 1870-1900
- with Stephen Spongberg A Reunion of Trees: The Discovery of Exotic Plants and Their Introduction Into North American and European Landscapes (Harvard University Press, 1998)
- The Private City: Philadelphia in Three Periods of Its Growth (University of Pennsylvania Press)
- Urban Wilderness: A History of the American City
- To Dwell Is to Garden: A History of Boston's Community Gardens (Northeastern University Press, 1987)
- Greater Boston: Adapting Regional Traditions to the Present
