= Elizabeth A. Fenn =

American historian

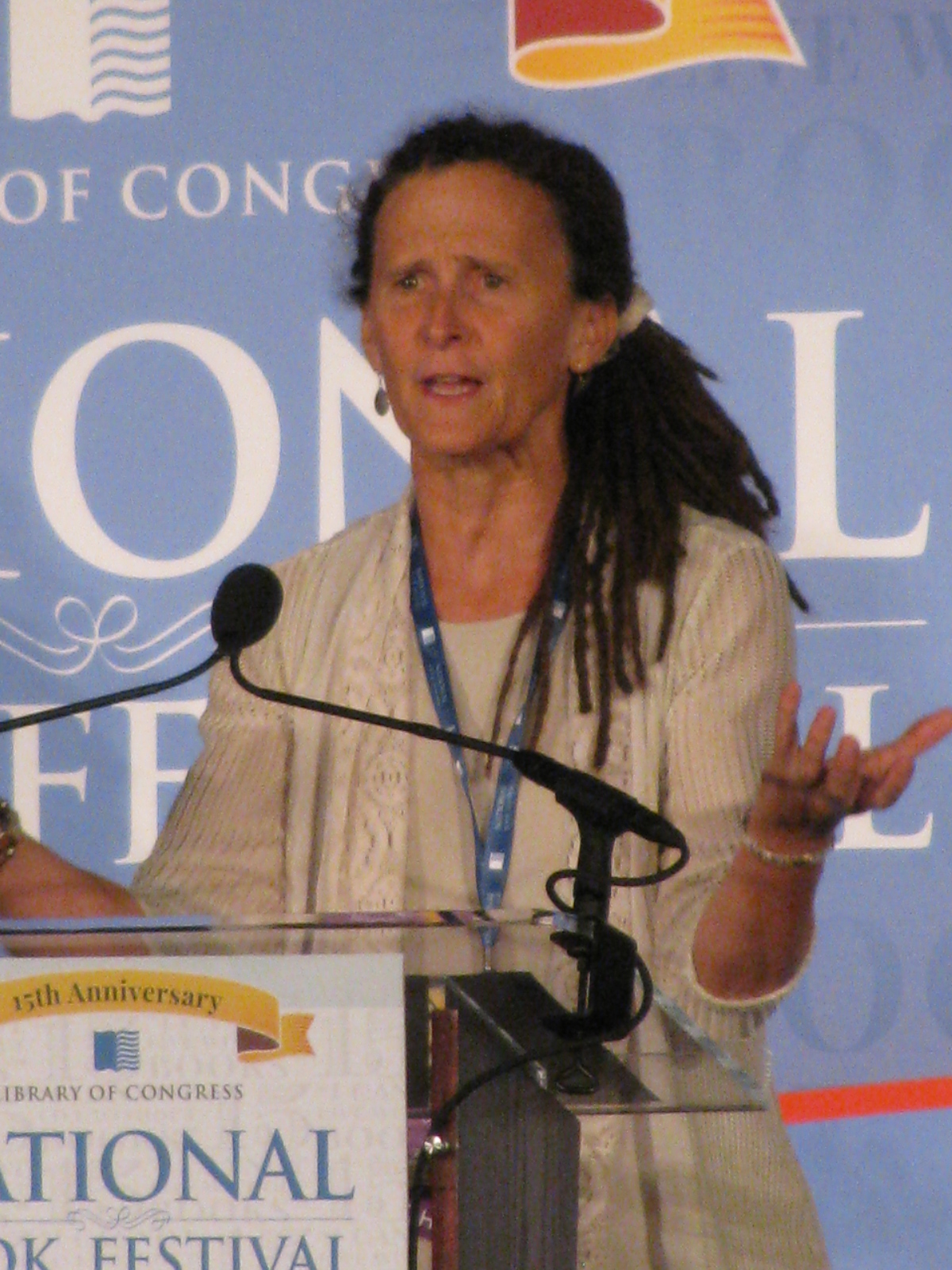
- Born: September 22, 1959 (age 67); Arlington, California, U.S.
- Education: Duke University; Yale University
- Occupation: Historian
- Notable work: Encounters at the Heart of the World: A History of the Mandan People
- Spouse: Peter H. Wood (m. 1999)
- Awards: Pulitzer Prize for History

Elizabeth Anne Fenn (born September 22, 1959) is an American historian. Her book Encounters at the Heart of the World: A History of the Mandan People, won the 2015 Pulitzer Prize for History. She served as the Walter S. and Lucienne Driskill chair in Western American History at University of Colorado Boulder. She is now retired as a distinguished professor emerita.

== Career ==
Fenn received a Bachelor of Arts degree in history (with honors) from Duke University in 1981, then attended Yale University, finishing her master's degree in 1985. Fenn originally planned to write her dissertation on millenarianism in Native American culture, but left her doctoral program at Yale before it was finished, as she was "bored" with academia. Fenn entered the auto mechanic program at Durham Technical Community College and worked as a mechanic around the Durham, North Carolina, area for eight years before returning to Yale in 1995 to complete her studies. Pox Americana, her dissertation about the 1775–82 North American smallpox epidemic, was written while working part-time, and completed in 1999. Fenn was interviewed on multiple national news outlets about biological warfare after the September 11 attacks.

Fenn won the 2004 Cox Book Prize for her work Pox Americana: The Great Smallpox Epidemic of 1775-1782. She received the Public Scholar Award from the National Endowment for the Humanities in 2019.

Prior to joining the University of Colorado Boulder in 2012, Fenn taught at George Washington University from 1999 to 2002 and Duke from 2002 to 2012.

She married Peter H. Wood in 1999.

== Works ==
- ——; Wood, Peter H. (1983). Natives & Newcomers: The Way We Lived in North Carolina Before 1770. University of North Carolina Press. ISBN 978-0-8078-4101-3.
- —— (October 2, 2002). Pox Americana: The Great Smallpox Epidemic of 1775-82. Farrar, Straus and Giroux. ISBN 978-1-4668-0804-1.
- —— (March 11, 2014). Encounters at the Heart of the World: A History of the Mandan People. Hill and Wang. ISBN 978-0-374-71107-8.
