= Greater Reconstruction =

Period in US history

- Mid 19th century – late 19th century
Antebellum Era – Age of Jackson	Gilded Age – Progressive Era
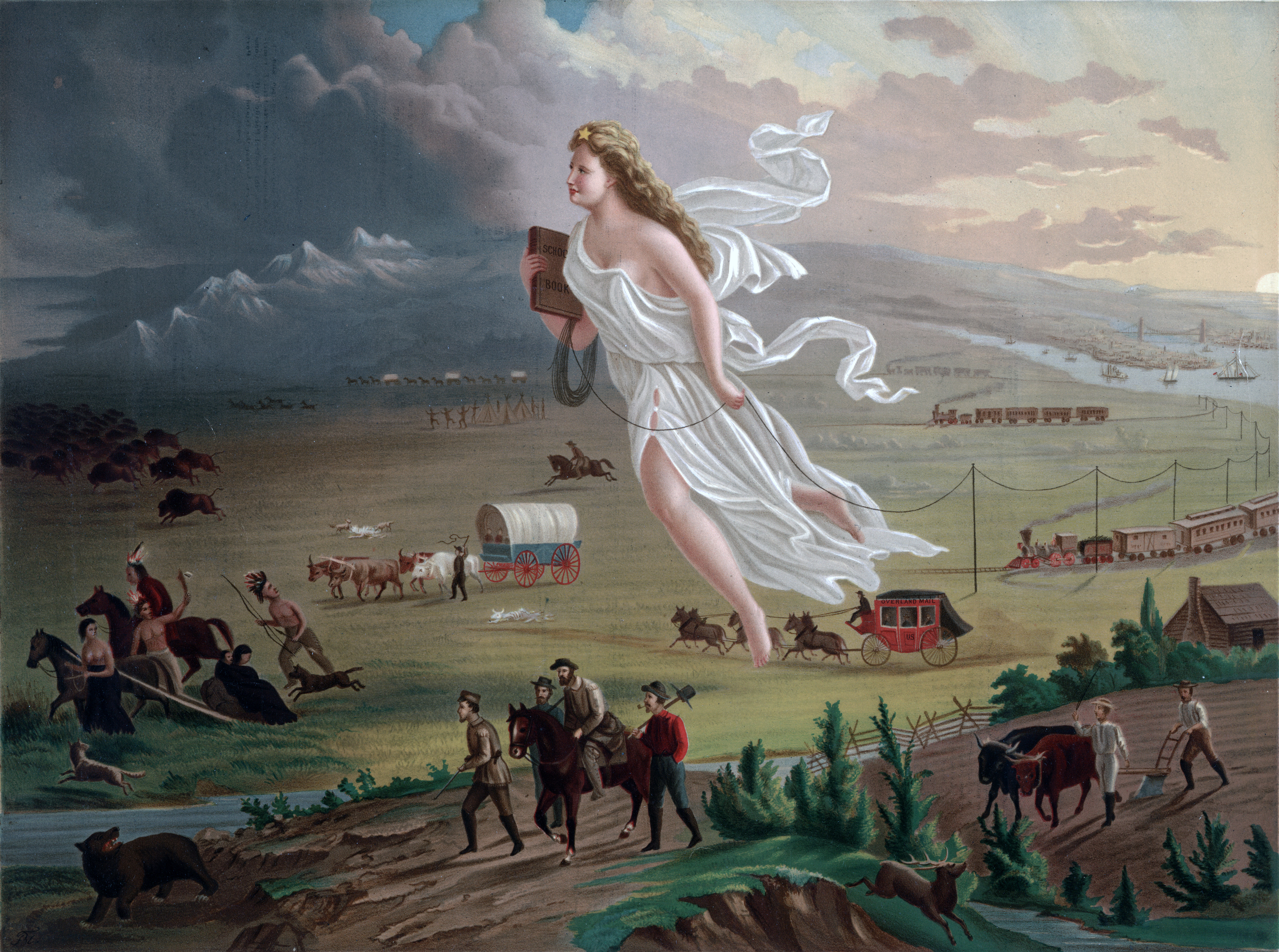
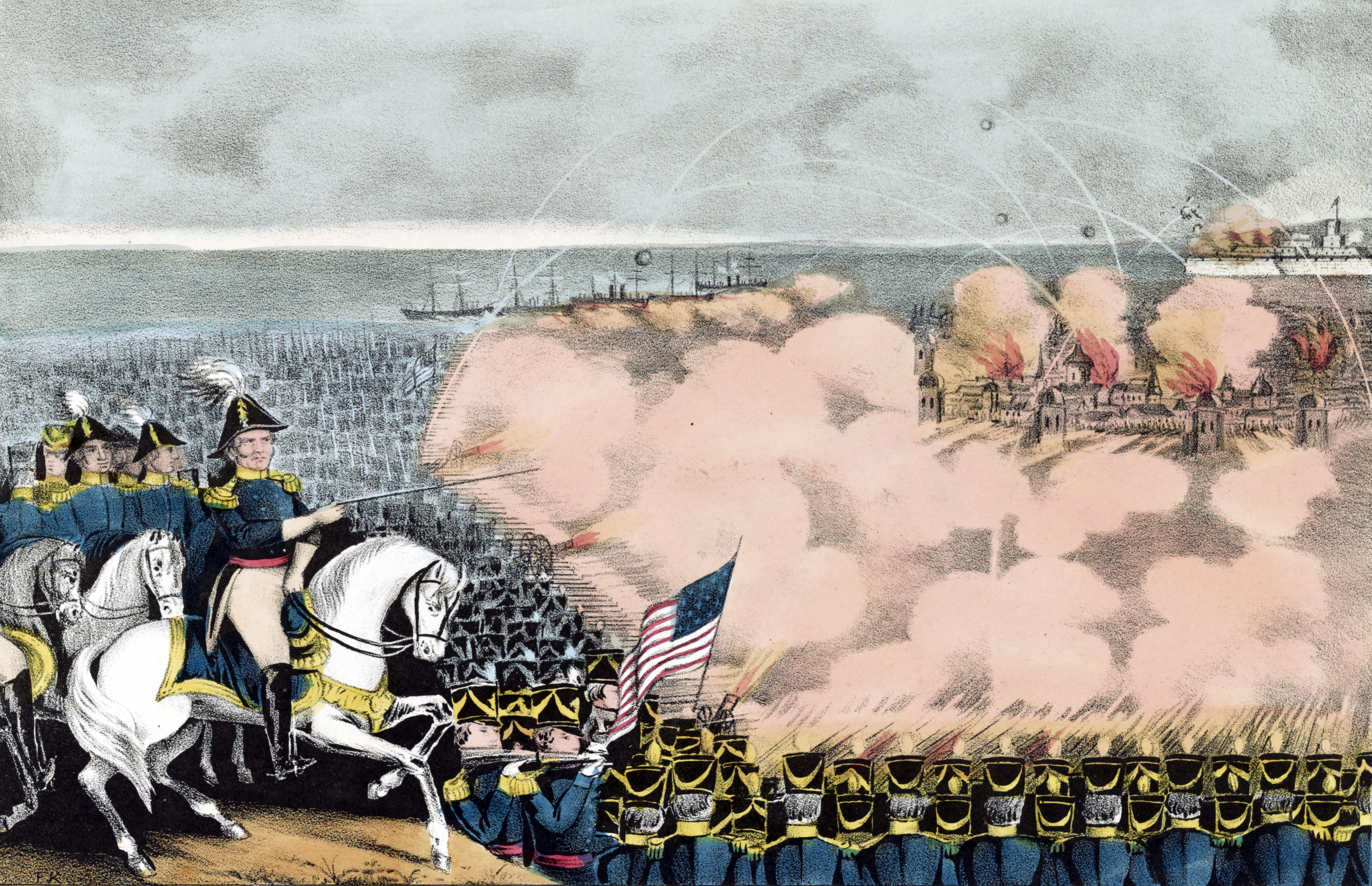
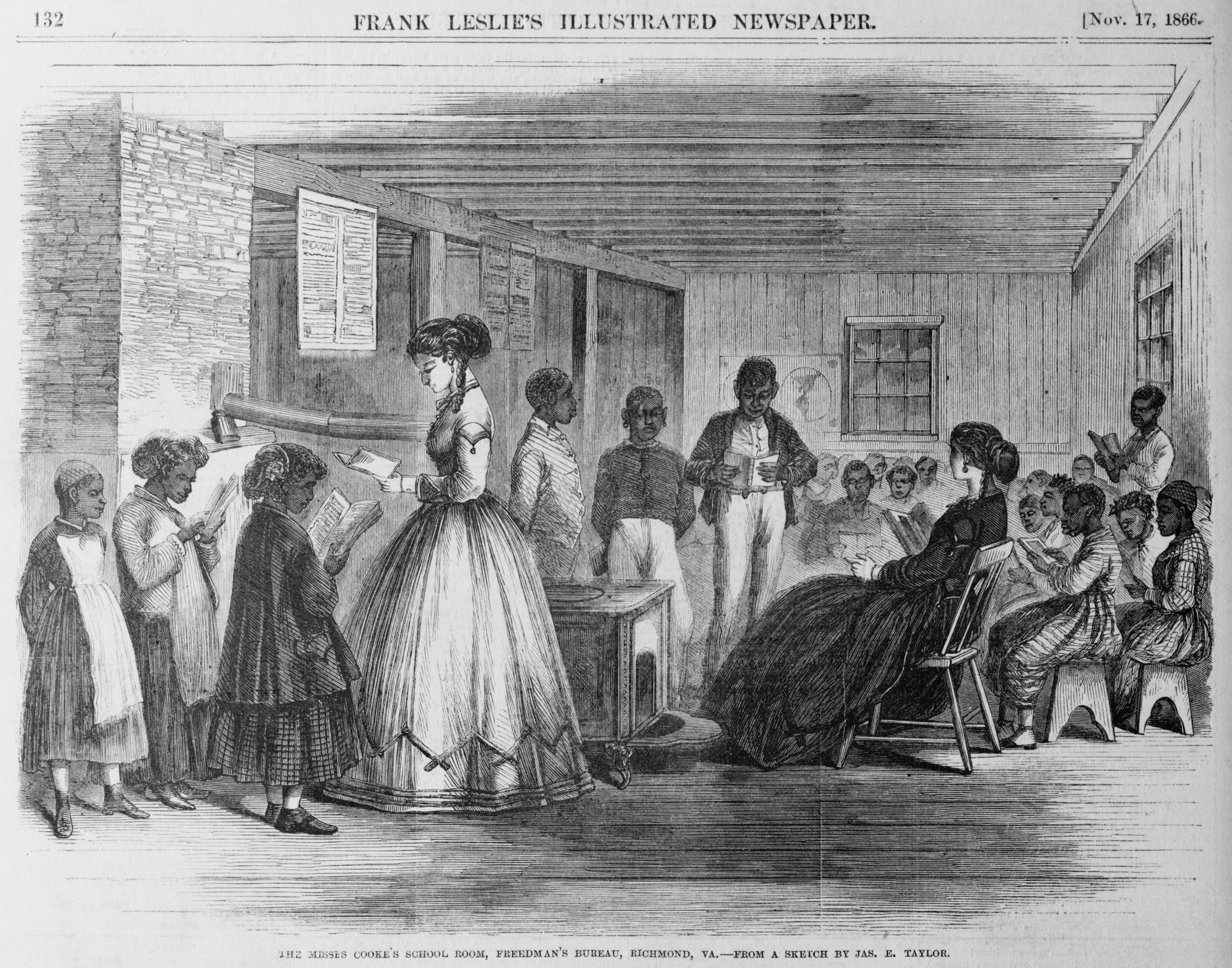
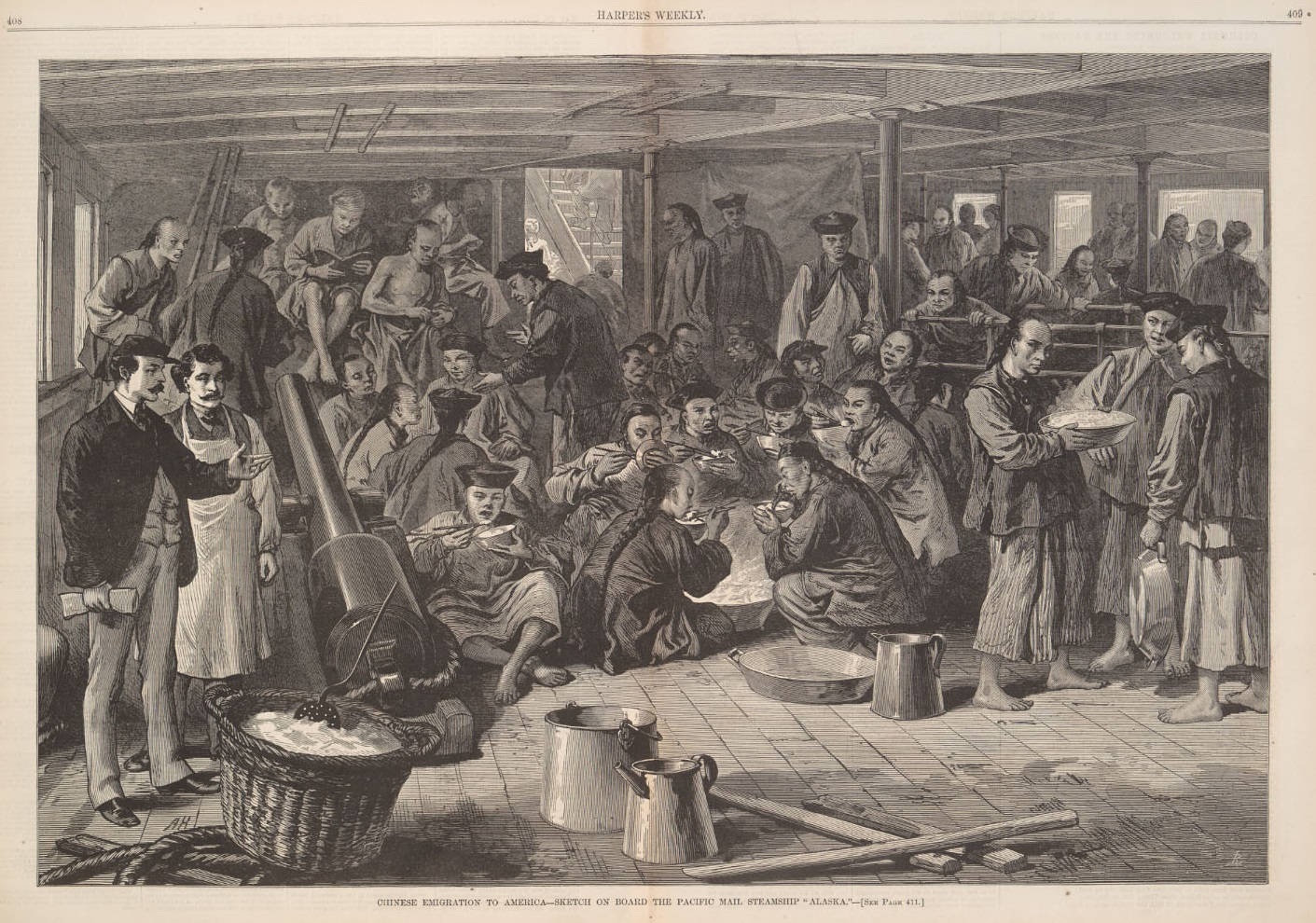
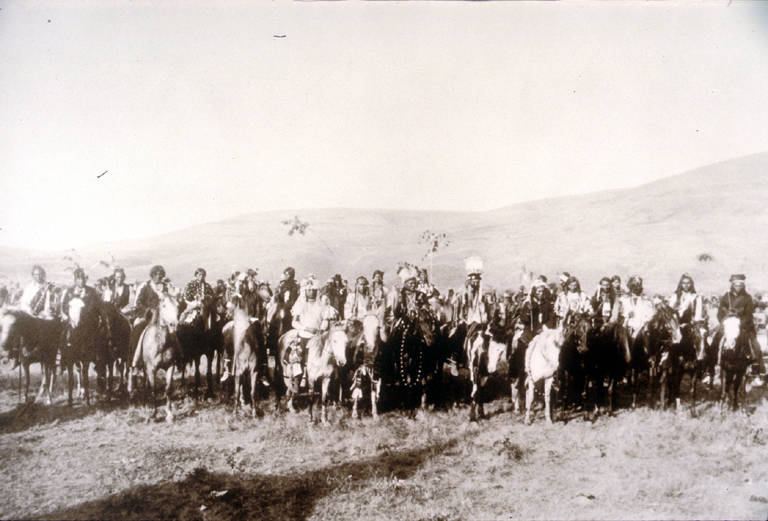
- Clockwise from top: John Gast's American Progress (1872); Freedmen's Bureau school (1866); Chief Joseph and the Nez Perce (1877); Chinese emigrants aboard S. S. Alaska (1876); Winfield Scott at the Siege of Veracruz (1847)
- Location: United States
- Including: Civil War era; Reconstruction era
- Key events: Mexican–American War; American Civil War; Fourteenth Amendment; American Indian Wars; Chinese Exclusion Act; Edmunds Act; Dawes Act; Spanish–American War

The Greater Reconstruction was a period in the history of the United States during the nineteenth century characterized by racial tensions, westward settler colonialism, ideas about republican citizenship, and expanding federal power. After America claimed substantial western lands in the Treaty of Guadalupe Hidalgo after winning the Mexican–American War, the federal government of the United States clashed over questions of political sovereignty and citizenship with several demographic groups who lived in or migrated to the newly claimed territory, such as American Indians, Chinese Americans, Mexican Americans, and Mormons. In the aftermath of the American Civil War, there was similar debate about citizenship and sovereignty for ex-Confederates and recently emancipated African Americans in the southern United States. Americans and their governments debated who could belong in a country that was increasingly diverse. White Americans and government leaders often believed conforming to Euro-American cultural norms was a prerequisite to citizenship in the United States. They were willing to empower the government to enforce this conformity, even with force and violence.

== Historiography ==
Elliott West coined and introduced the concept of the Greater Reconstruction in 2002 as part of a speech he delivered to the Western History Association as its president that year. He argued that the history of the western United States was connected to questions that the American Civil War and Reconstruction era raised about citizenship and that the region lay at the center of the nation's history of race relations and state power. A series editor's introduction to West's 2023 Continental Reckoning called the Greater Reconstruction concept "the most notable historiographical idea advanced about the American West in the twenty-first century". In 2024, a Western Historical Quarterly article described a "Greater Reconstruction historiographical turn".

Periodizations focused on the Civil War generally held that Reconstruction began in 1863, when Abraham Lincoln issued the Emancipation Proclamation, and ended in 1877, when federal troops stopped occupying the southern United States. West has called that Reconstruction "the lesser one". The Greater Reconstruction began with the Mexican–American War, when the United States' western territorial acquisitions "triggered an American racial crisis", in West's words, from the perspective of racist Euro-Americans. Historians have proposed a variety of endings for the Greater Reconstruction, including the Nez Perce War in 1877, the passage of the Chinese Exclusion Act in 1882, the passage of the Dawes Act in 1887, and the Spanish–American War in 1898.

== History ==
In 1848, the United States won the Mexican–American War, and as part of the Treaty of Guadalupe Hidalgo Mexico a vast territory stretching from the Rocky Mountains to the Pacific Coast. This brought numerous eighty thousand Mexicans and numerous American Indians under the purview of American governance. White Americans who held government power reconstructed the newly acquired territory through policies meant to assimilate both Mexicans and American Indians, eliminating what whites considered inferior cultural and racial differences. This included repeatedly rejecting the statehood petitions of Arizona Territory and New Mexico Territory because of their Hispanic populations and displacing Indigenous peoples from historic homelands to reservations and American Indian boarding schools.

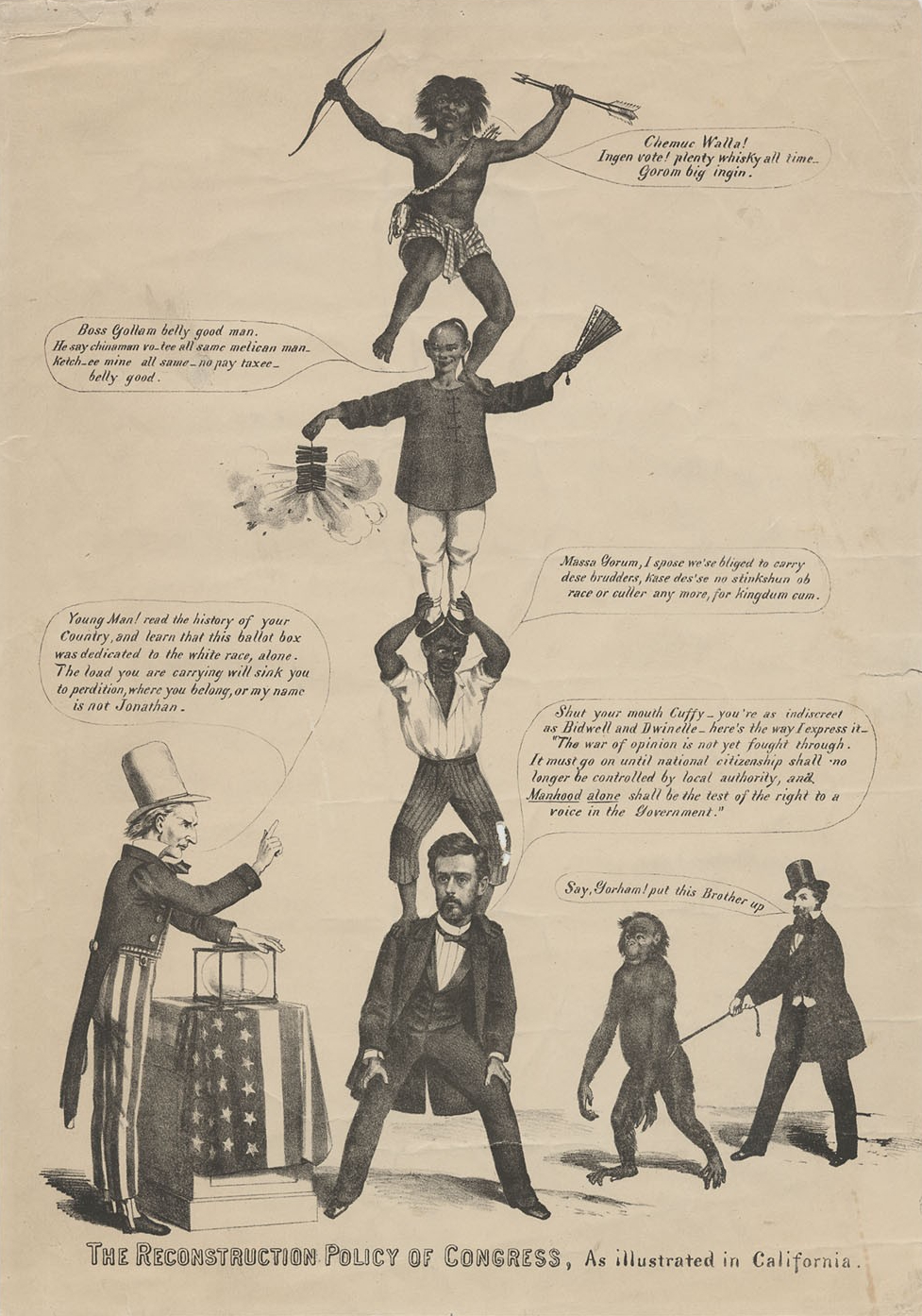
A racist political cartoon lampooning the idea of citizenship for all people of color

As the federal government's power increased as part of the Greater Reconstruction, it used this power to extend rights of citizenship to more people, in particular the formerly enslaved, through the Fourteenth Amendment and Civil Rights Act of 1866, but these new federal protections overtly excluded American Indians from citizenship.

After the American Civil War, Republicans and Democrats clashed over political control of California and debated the place of people of color in the reunified United States, whom white Americans often dismissively called "heathen" in a dual reference to religion and race. California Democrats argued that Republican support for Black citizenship necessarily went hand in hand with support for enfranchising American Indians and Chinese immigrants, whom white Californians hated. Republicans, hoping to brush off such accusations while vying for the votes of a deeply racist white Californian electorate, countered that Protestant Christianity should instead be the litmus test for inclusion in citizenship. Black Americans—the majority of whom had long been Christian—and Chinese immigrant converts, therefore, deserved citizenship in the California Republican worldview. This framework, however, excluded, whether implicitly or explicitly, Jews, Irish Catholics, and atheists. California Democrats disagreed, holding that citizenship should be limited to people racialized as white without regard for religion, thereby including Jews, Irish Catholics, and atheists but excluding Black Americans, American Indians, and Chinese immigrants.

"Sherman's dashing Yankee boys will never make the coast!"
So the saucy rebels said and 'twas a handsome boast,
Had they not forgot, alas! to reckon with the Host,
While we were marching through Georgia
– "Marching Through Georgia", a Union marching song

"Orland's boys with carpet bags will never take Salt Lake!"
So the royal families said, but that was their mistake,
We’ll show them at the ballot boxes who will "take the cake,"
While we go marching through Zion.
– "Marching Through Zion," a Liberal Party political song

Northern Republicans after the Civil War often thought Utah Territory and the Intermountain West—politically dominated by members and leaders of the Church of Jesus Christ of Latter-day Saints (also called "Mormonism")—also needed to be reconstructed in a manner similar to the southern United States. The Republican platform of 1856 called southern slavery and Mormon polygamy the "twin relics of barbarism," and Republican politicians believed the Mormon West was a place of despotic tyranny in the same way the slavocratic South had been. Historian Sarah Barringer Gordon called the United States' efforts to legislatively and judicially eliminate Mormon polygamy "a second reconstruction in the West" in which the federal government exercised governmental power in a manner similar to the Reconstruction of the South.

== Bibliography ==
=== Books ===
- Blackhawk, Ned (2023). The Rediscovery of America: Native Peoples and the Unmaking of U. S. History. The Henry Roe Cloud Series on American Indians and Modernity. Yale University Press. ISBN 978-0-300-24405-2.
- Dean, Adam Wesley (2015). An Agrarian Republic: Farming, Antislavery Politics, and Nature Parks in the Civil War Era. University of North Carolina Press. ISBN 978-1-4696-1991-0.
- Downs, Gregory P. (2019). After Appomattox: Military Occupation and the Ends of War. Harvard University Press. ISBN 978-0-674-74398-4.
- Gallagher, Winifred (2022). New Women in the Old West: From Settlers to Suffragists, an Untold American Story. Penguin Random House. ISBN 9780735223257.
- Gordon, Sarah Barringer (2002). The Mormon Question: Polygamy and Constitutional Conflict in Nineteenth-Century America. Studies in Legal History. University of North Carolina Press. ISBN 0-8078-4987-1.
- Hahn, Steven (2016). A Nation Without Borders: The United States and Its World in an Age of Civil Wars, 1830–1910. Penguin History of the United States. Viking Penguin. ISBN 978-0670024681.
- Kerstetter, Todd M. (2015). Inspiration and Innovation: Religion in the American West. John Wiley & Sons. doi:10.1002/9781394261338. ISBN 978-1-118-84838-8.
- Kiser, William S. (2022). Illusions of Empire: The Civil War and Reconstruction in the U. S.–Mexico Borderlands. University of Pennsylvania Press. ISBN 978-0-8122-5351-1. JSTOR j.ctv1f45qw0.
- Paddison, Joshua (2012). American Heathens: Religion, Race, and Reconstruction in California. Western Histories. University of California Press and Huntington Library. ISBN 978-0-52028-905-5.
- Pierce, Jason E. (2016). Making the White Man's West: Whiteness and the Creation of the American West. University Press of Colorado. ISBN 978-1-60732-395-2. JSTOR j.ctt19jcg63.
- Sinha, Manisha (2024). The Rise and Fall of the Second American Republic: Reconstruction, 1860-1920. Liveright. ISBN 9781631498442. OCLC 1379265882.
- West, Elliott (2009). The Last Indian War: The Nez Perce Story. Pivotal Moments in American History. Oxford University Press. ISBN 978-0-19-513675-3.
- West, Elliott (2023). Continental Reckoning: The American West in the Age of Expansion. History of the American West. University of Nebraska Press. ISBN 978-1496233585.
- White, Richard (2017). The Republic for Which It Stands: The United States During Reconstruction and the Gilded Age, 1865–1896. Oxford History of the United States. Oxford University Press. ISBN 978-0199735815.
- Wrobel, David M. (2013). Global West, American Frontier: Travel, Empire, and Exceptionalism from Manifest Destiny to the Great Depression. University of New Mexico Press. ISBN 978-0-8263-5370-2.

=== Chapters ===
- Arenson, Adam (2015). "Introduction". In Arenson, Adam; Graybill, Andrew R. (eds.). Civil War Wests: Testing the Limits of the United States. University of California Press. pp. 1–14. doi:10.1525/9780520959576-001. ISBN 978-0-520-28378-7.
- Downs, Gregory P. (2015). "Three Faces of Sovereignty: Governing Confederate, Mexican, and Indian Texas in the Civil War Era". In Arenson, Adam; Graybill, Andrew R. (eds.). Civil War Wests: Testing the Limits of the United States. University of California Press. pp. 118–138. doi:10.1525/9780520959576-007. ISBN 978-0-520-28378-7.
- Emberton, Carole (2015). "Axes of Empire: Race, Region, and the 'Greater Reconstruction' of Federal Authority After Emancipation". In Link, William A.; Broomall, James J. (eds.). Rethinking American Emancipation: Legacies of Slavery and the Quest for Black Freedom. Cambridge Studies on the American South. Cambridge University Press. pp. 119–144. doi:10.1017/CBO9781139680998.006. ISBN 978-1-107-07303-6.
- Etulain, Richard (2023). "Series Editor's Introduction". Continental Reckoning: The American West in the Age of Expansion. History of the American West. University of Nebraska Press. pp. xiii–xiv. ISBN 978-1496233585.
- Genetin-Pilawa, C. Joseph (2015). "Ely S. Parker and the Paradox of Reconstruction Politics in Indian Country". In Downs, Gregory P.; Masur, Kate (eds.). The World the Civil War Made. University of North Carolina Press. pp. 183–205. doi:10.5149/northcarolina/9781469624181.003.0008 (inactive 6 July 2025). ISBN 9781469624181.
- Green, Michael S. (2019). "Eastern and Western Empire: Thaddeus Stevens and the Greater Reconstruction". In Birkner, Michael J.; Miller, Randall M.; Quist, John W. (eds.). The Worlds of James Buchanan and Thaddeus Stevens: Place, Personality, and Politics in the Civil War Era. Conflicting Worlds: New Dimensions of the American Civil War. Louisiana State University Press. pp. 215–236. ISBN 978-0-8071-7081-6 – via Project Muse.
- Paddison, Joshua (2015). "Race, Religion, and Naturalization: How the West Shaped Citizenship Debates in the Reconstruction Congress". In Arenson, Adam; Graybill, Andrew R. (eds.). Civil War Wests: Testing the Limits of the United States. University of California Press. pp. 181–201. doi:10.1525/9780520959576-010. ISBN 978-0-520-28378-7.

=== Dissertations ===
- Hodge, Joshua Stephen (May 2019). Alabama's Public Wilderness: Reconstruction, Natural Resources, and the End of the Southern Commons, 1866–1905 (PhD thesis). University of Tennessee.
- Semmes, Ryan Patrick (May 2020). Exporting Reconstruction: Civilization, Citizenship, and Republicanism During the Grant Administration, 1869–1877 (PhD thesis). Mississippi State University.

=== Journals ===
- Aron, Stephen (Winter 2023). "Elliott West. Continental Reckoning: The American West in the Age of Expansion". California History. 100 (4): 113–115. doi:10.1525/ch.2023.100.4.113.
- Atkinson, Evelyn (March 2020). "Slaves, Coolies, and Shareholders: Corporations Claim the Fourteenth Amendment". Journal of the Civil War Era. 10 (1): 54–80. doi:10.1353/cwe.2020.0003. JSTOR 26888072.
- Broxmeyer, Jeffrey D.; Andersen, Lisa M. F.; Barreyre, Nicolas; Edwards, Rebecca; Lansing, Michael J.; Lumba, Allan E. S.; White, Tara Y. (January 2023). "New Directions in Political History". The Journal of the Gilded Age and Progressive Era. 22 (1): 63–95. doi:10.1017/S1537781422000548.
- Charlton, Ryan (Summer 2019). "'Our Ice-islands': Images of Alaska in the Reconstruction Era". Journal of Transnational American Studies. 10 (1): 23–46. doi:10.5070/T8101044211.
- Deloria, Philip J. (September 2022). "Indigenous/American Pasts and Futures". The Journal of American History. 109 (2): 255–270. doi:10.1093/jahist/jaac231.
- Funk, Kellen; Mullen, Lincoln A. (February 2018). "The Spine of American Law: Digital Text Analysis and U. S. Legal Practice". The American Historical Review. 123 (1): 132–164. doi:10.1093/ahr/123.1.132.
- Hämäläinen, Pekka (December 2016). "Reconstructing the Great Plains: The Long Struggle for Sovereignty and Dominance in the Heart of the Continent". Journal of the Civil War Era. 6 (4): 481–509. doi:10.1353/cwe.2016.0070. JSTOR 26070453.
- Kiser, William S. (July 2023). "Greater Reconstruction in Historiographical Perspective". Southwestern Historical Quarterly. 127 (1): 108–113. doi:10.1353/swh.2023.a900771.
- Martin, Nicole (Summer 2024). "The Indian, Chinese, and Mormon Questions: The American Home and Reconstruction Politics in the West". Pacific Historical Review. 93 (3): 445–474. doi:10.1525/phr.2024.93.3.445.
- Prior, David (September 2010). "Civilization, Republic, Nation: Contested Keywords, Northern Republicans, and the Forgotten Reconstruction of Mormon Utah". Civil War History. 56 (3): 283–310. doi:10.1353/cwh.2010.0003.
- Schneider, Khal (March 2016). "Distinctions That Must Be Preserved: On the Civil War, American Indians, and the West". Civil War History. 62 (1): 36–54. doi:10.1353/cwh.2016.0011.
- Smith, Stacey L. (December 2016). "Beyond North and South: Putting the West in the Civil War and Reconstruction". Journal of the Civil War Era. 6 (4): 566–591. doi:10.1353/cwe.2016.0073. JSTOR 26070456.
- Suárez, Camille (Winter 2024). "Junta Democrática: Californios and Reconstruction in California". Western Historical Quarterly. 55 (4): 271–290. doi:10.1093/whq/whae042.
- Thomas, Brook (March 2017). "The Unfinished Task of Grounding Reconstruction's Promise". Journal of the Civil War Era. 7 (1): 16–38. doi:10.1353/cwe.2017.0011. JSTOR 26070488.
- Waite, Kevin (July 2023). "The Brittle West: Secession and Separatism in the Southwest Borderlands During the Civil War Era". Southwestern Historical Quarterly. 127 (1): 8–28. doi:10.1353/swh.2023.a900767.
- West, Elliott (Spring 2003). "Reconstructing Race". Western Historical Quarterly. 34 (1): 6–26. doi:10.2307/25047206. JSTOR 25047206.
- West, Elliott (July 2023b). "'It Is Hard to Tell Who Is Who and What Is What': An Introduction to the Southwestern Historical Quarterly's Special Issue on Greater Reconstruction in the Southwestern Borderlands". Southwestern Historical Quarterly. 127 (1): 1–7. doi:10.1353/swh.2023.a900766.
- Willard, David C. (February 2019). "Criminal Amnesty, State Courts, and the Reach of Reconstruction". Journal of Southern History. 85 (1): 105–136. doi:10.1353/soh.2019.0003.
