= Caughey Western History Association Prize =

The Caughey Western History Association Prize is given annually by the Western History Association to the best book published the previous year on the American West. The winner receives $2,500 and a certificate.

== Winners ==
- 2024 – Elliott West Continental Reckoning: The American West in the Age of Expansion
- 2023 – Michael John Witgen Seeing Red: Indigenous Land, American Expansion, and the Political Economy of Plunder in North America
- 2022 – Traci Brynne Voyles The Settler Sea: California's Salton Sea and the Consequences of Colonialism
- 2021 – Alice Baumgartner – South to Freedom: Runaway Slaves to Mexico and the Road to the Civil War
- 2020 – Maurice Crandall – These People Have Always Been a Republic: Indigenous Electorates in the U.S.-Mexico Borderlands, 1598–1912
- 2019 – Monica Muñoz Martinez – The Injustice Never Leaves You: Anti-Mexican Violence in Texas
- 2018 – Louis Warren – God's Red Son: The Ghost Dance Religion and the Making of Modern America
- 2017 – James F. Brooks – Mesa of Sorrows: A History of the Awat'ovi Massacre
- 2016 – Edward Dallam Melillo – Strangers on Familiar Soil: Rediscovering the Chile–California Connection
- 2016 – Joshua Reid, The Sea Is My Country: The Maritime World of the Makahs
- 2015 – Andrew Needham – Power Lines: Phoenix and the Making of the Modern Southwest
- 2014 – Keith R. Widder – Beyond Pontiac's Shadow: Michilmackinac and the Anglo-Indian War of 1763
- 2013 – Frederick E. Hoxie – This Indian Country: American Indian Activists and the Place They Made
- 2012 – Anne F. Hyde – Empires, Nations and Families: A History of the North American West, 1800–1860
- 2011 – Erika Lee and Judy Yung – Angel Island: Immigrant Gateway to America
- 2010 – Elliott West – The Last Indian War: The Nez Perce Story
- 2009 – Pekka Hämäläinen – The Comanche Empire
- 2008 – B. Byron Price – Charles M. Russell: A Catalogue Raisonné
- 2007 – Albert L. Hurtado – John Sutter: A Life on the North American Frontier
- 2006 – Louis S. Warren – Buffalo Bill's America: William Cody and the Wild West Show
- 2005 – Jeffrey Ostler – The Plains Sioux and U.S. Colonialism from Lewis and Clark to Wounded Knee
- 2004 – Colin G. Calloway – One Vast Winter Count: The Native American West Before Lewis and Clark
- 2003 – Will Bagley – Blood of the Prophets: Brigham Young and the Massacre at Mountain Meadows
- 2002 – Donald Worster – A River Running West: The Life of John Wesley Powell
- 2001 – Robert V. Hine and John Mack Faragher – The American West: A New Interpretive History
- 2000 – Walter Nugent – Into the West: The Story of Its People
- 1999 – Elliott West – The Contested Plains: Indians, Goldseekers, and the Rush to Colorado
- 1998 – Malcolm J Rorhbough – Days of Gold: The California Gold Rush and the American Nation
- 1997 – Richard W. Etulain – Re–Imagining the Modern American West: A Century of Fiction, History and Art
- 1996 – David Wallace Adams – Education for Extinction: American Indians and the Boarding School Experience, 1875–1928
- 1995 – Clyde A. Milner III, Carol A. O’Connor, Martha A. Sandweiss, eds. – The Oxford History of the American West
- 1994 – Robert M. Utley – The Lance and the Shield: The Life and Times of Sitting Bull
- 1993 – David J. Weber – The Spanish Frontier in North America

Prior to 1993, it was known as the Western History Association Prize for a “distinguished body of writing”

- 1992 – Howard Lamar
- 1991 – W. Turrentine Jackson
- 1990 – Wallace Stegner
- 1989 – William T. Hagan
- 1988 – Robert M. Utley
- 1987 – Francis Paul Prucha
- 1986 – Paul W. Gates
- 1985 – No Award Given
- 1984 – No Award Given
- 1983 – Robert G. Athearn
