= Michael John Witgen =

Native American historian

Michael John Witgen PhD
- Citizenship: Red Cliff Band of Lake Superior Chippewa Indians of Wisconsin, American
- Occupation: History professor

Academic background
- Education: BA: Texas Christian University (1988)
- Alma mater: PhD: University of Washington (2003)

Academic work
- Discipline: History
- Institutions: Columbia University
- Website: history.columbia.edu/person/witgen-michael

Michael John Witgen is a Native American historian and author. He is a professor of history at Columbia University.

== Background ==
Witgen is Ojibwe and a citizen of the Red Cliff Band of Lake Superior Chippewa Indians of Wisconsin.

== Career ==
He specializes in Native American history, especially of the Upper Midwest and Great Lakes region of North America. His 2022 book Seeing Red: Indigenous Land, American Expansion, and the Political Economy of Plunder in North America details the political and economic pressures that led to the Anishinaabe and other Native peoples becoming dispossessed of their lands during the 18th and 19th centuries. However, Witgen's research challenges the misconception that the Native Peoples of North America quickly became overwhelmed and displaced by White settlers. Witgen explains how the Anishinaabeg peoples used their greater numbers, access to natural resources, and political maneuvering to keep most of their lands well into the 19th century. The book was a finalist for the Pulitzer Prize for History in 2023. Seeing Red was reviewed in the New York Review of Books by Francisco Cantu who described the work as "neither a popular history nor a polemic, offering instead a deeply researched look at the ideological and legal foundations of the systems that have despoiled Native nations." Cantu states that Witgen joined a new school of historians who challenged the myth that Native Peoples in North American were quickly conquered during American westward expansion, in fact Witgen's works focus on Native American resilience and adaptability in the face of an encroaching American political and military system. The book was also awarded the Organization of American Historians James A. Rawley Prize and the Western History Association's Caughey Western History Association Prize for the best history book about the American West.

Witgen's first book, An Infinity of Nations: How the Native New World Shaped Early North America explains how Native Peoples formed a "Native New World", retaining their culture, society, political system, economy well into European colonization of the East Coast. They successfully resisted forced assimilation but also joined the world economy. Witgen's study focuses on the Anishinaabe and Dakota peoples to document this cultural shift.
