= Paul Andrew Hutton =

American historian (born 1949)

Paul A. Hutton
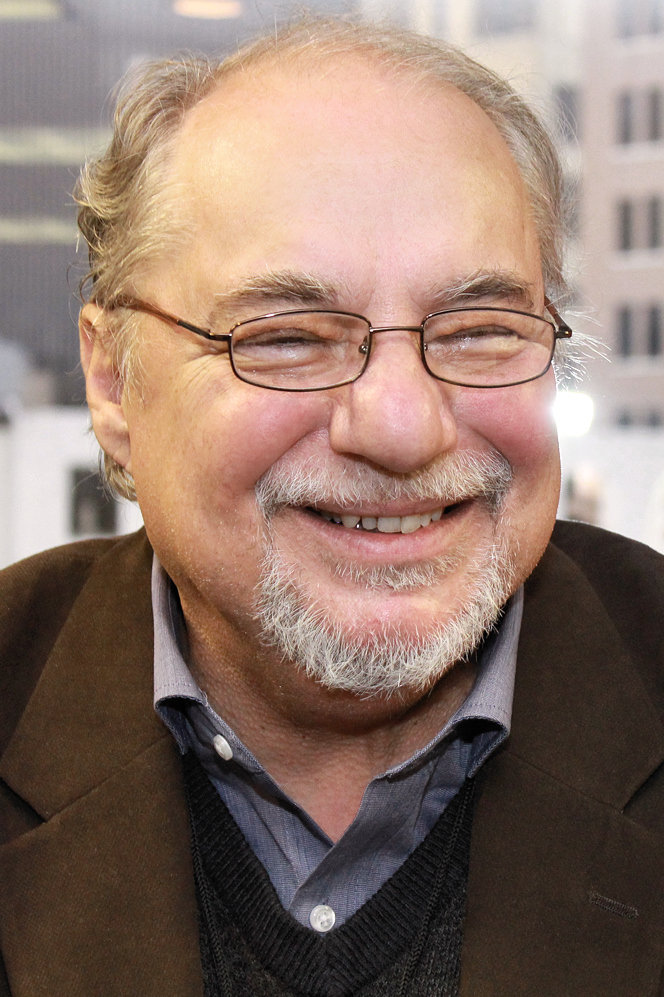
- Hutton at the 2016 Texas Book Festival
- Born: Paul Andrew Hutton; October 23, 1949 (age 77); Frankfurt, West Germany
- Occupations: cultural historian, scholar, author, television personality
- Years active: 1972–present
- Spouses: Vickie Bauer, 1972–1984 (divorced); Lynn Brittner, married in 1989 (divorced); Tracy Cogdill, married in 2001
- Children: daughter with Bauer, two children with Brittner, adopted two daughters of Codgill

Paul Andrew Hutton is an American writer, and television personality. He is also a retired Distinguished Professor of History at the University of New Mexico and the former executive director of Western History Association and past president of Western Writers of America. He retired at the end of the spring semester of 2025.

== Career ==
=== Research and literary works ===
At the University of New Mexico, Hutton helped to gather information about George Armstrong Custer for the readers. The result of Hutton's research was The Custer Reader, a collection of essays, photographs, and fiction regarding Custer and his complex personality. Hutton's 1985 book Phil Sheridan and His Army received many awards for historical writing, including the Ray Allen Billington Award. Other books he has written include:

- The Apache Wars: The Hunt for Geronimo. New York City: Bantam Books. 2017. ISBN 978-07-70435-83-7.

He has written many other award-winning essays, scripts, and articles. He has done a great deal of work in television documentaries, and was a historical consultant for the films The Missing and "Cowboys and Aliens". Dr Hutton has appeared in, written or narrated over 150 television documentaries on CBS, NBC, PBS, Discover, Disney Channel, TBS, TNN, A&E, and the History Channel. Listed below are recent samples of his work.

=== Film and television writing credits ===
- Eighty Acres of Hell (TV) – (writer) (2006)
- Investigating History TV series – (unknown episodes) (2003)
- Carson and Cody: The Hunter Heroes (TV) – (writer) (2003)

Hutton also served as the President of the Western Writers of America from 2002 to 2004.

=== Television producing credits ===
- Investigating History – TV series (co-producer) (unknown episodes) (2003)
- Carson and Cody: The Hunter Heroes – (2003) (TV) (producer)

=== Television and film appearances ===
As self:

- The Real West (A&E) – 60 episodes (1993–2006)
- Biography – Billy the Kid (2006)
- Biography – The James Gang: Outlaw Brothers (TV episode) (1995)
- CBS – Wyatt Earp: Walk with a Legend (TV)(1994)
- American Experience: Wyatt Earp (2010)
- American Experience: Custer's Last Stand (2012)
- American Experience: Butch Cassidy & The Sundance Kid (2014)

As actor:

- Naked Gun 33 1/3: The Final Insult (1991) as Doctor

Hutton made his cameo appearance in the movie Naked Gun 33 1/3 (as a doctor at the very end of the film) while he was collaborating with David Zucker on a screenplay about Davy Crockett.

== Personal ==
A native German, adopted by an American Air Force couple, he was reared primarily in England, Texas, Taiwan, and Indiana. Hutton married the former Vicki Bauer on July 25, 1972. They had a daughter. They were divorced August 1984. He then married Lynn Brittner in 1989 and they had two children. They eventually divorced.

He married Tracy Cogdill in 2001 and adopted her two daughters from a previous marriage.

== Education ==
Dr Hutton graduated with a B.A. in History from Indiana University Bloomington, in 1972, where he also obtained his M.A. (1974) and his Ph.D. in History (1981).
