= Pekka Hämäläinen =

Finnish historian and academic (born 1967)

Pekka Hämäläinen FBA
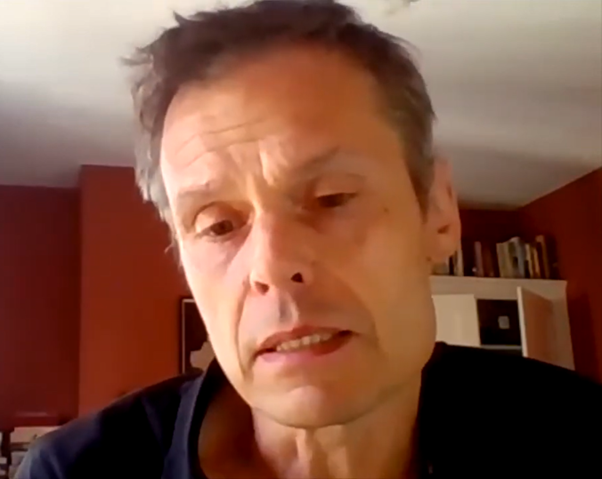
- Hämäläinen in 2020
- Born: Pekka Johannes Hämäläinen; 1967 (age 58–59); Helsinki, Finland
- Occupation: Historian
- Title: Rhodes Professor of American History

Academic background
- Education: University of Helsinki

Academic work
- Institutions: Texas A&M University; University of California, Santa Barbara; University of Oxford
- Notable works: The Comanche Empire (2008)

Pekka Johannes Hämäläinen FBA (born 1967 in Helsinki) is a Finnish historian who was the Rhodes Professor of American History at the University of Oxford from 2012 until his retirement, in 2025. He was formerly in the history department at University of California, Santa Barbara.

== Life and career ==
Hämäläinen was born and raised in Helsinki, Finland. While attending secondary school, he realized that he enjoyed history, with his core interest being Native American history.

He graduated from University of Helsinki with a Ph.D. in 2001 and went on to teach at Texas A&M University from 2002 to 2004. His work has appeared in the American Historical Review, Journal of American History, William and Mary Quarterly, and the Western Historical Quarterly. He then taught in the history department at University of California, Santa Barbara before moving to Oxford University.

Hämäläinen identifies with the late-20th century "new Indian history" movement, which aimed to challenge previous historiography dominated by Western European perspectives and instead use ethnohistorical methods to better understand indigenous experiences of colonialism.

In the late 2000s, his work focused on equestrianism in the American plains and southwest borderlands.

His 2008 book, The Comanche Empire, was positively reviewed and won the Bancroft Prize. In it, Hämäläinen argued that the Comanche occupation of the Southern Plains from the late 18th to early 19th centuries constituted an empire.

In 2019, Hämäläinen published Lakota America: A New History of Indigenous Power, covering the history of the Lakota people from the 17th to the 20th centuries; it claims similarly that the Lakota constituted an empire. The book was criticized by indigenous academics, such as Rutgers University historian Jameson "Jimmy" Sweet (Lakota/Dakota) and author Delphine Red Shirt (Oglala Lakota). Historian Nick Estes has also criticized the book, describing Hämäläinen's work as "post-modern cultural relativism at its worst", and Jameson Sweet rejected the idea of the Lakota as an empire, insisting that the Lakota were "a desperate people trying to survive and adapt to a turbulent world brought on by settler colonialism".

In 2022, Hämäläinen published Indigenous Continent: The Epic Contest for North America. This work aims to recast the history of the conquest of North America, in which Native Americans are assumed as destined to be conquered by the encroachment of European civilization, by emphasizing the considerable political and military power of various indigenous nations, such as the Great Sioux Nation and the Comanche empire. Critical reception of the book has been mixed. It was praised by historians like Elizabeth Fenn and Elliott West as well as by critic David Treuer as "great value...as a corrective polemic...restoring historical agency to Native peoples". Historians and native studies academics like Sweet and Ned Blackhawk criticized it. In an interview with The New York Times, Blackhawk dismissed Hämäläinen as a historian of "equestrianism" and objected to the book's "occasional disregard of things like law and policy, which are central to Native American sovereignty and lives." University of North Carolina historian Kathleen DuVal also criticized the book for not paying sufficient attention to the role of women in indigenous-colonial conflict.

== Awards ==
- 2009 Bancroft Prize
- 2008 Kate Broocks Bates Award
- 2009 Merle Curti Award
- 2009 Cundill Prize runner-up
- 2009 Caughey Western History Association Prize
- 2023 Fellow of the British Academy

== Works ==
- The Comanche Empire. New Haven, CT; Yale University Press. 2008. 512 pages. ISBN 978-0300151176.
- When Disease Makes History: Epidemics and Great Historical Turning Points. Helsinki, Finland; Yliopistopaino Printing Services. 2006. 314 pages. ISBN 978-9515706409.
- with Benjamin H. Johnson.Major Problems in the History of North American Borderlands. Boston, MA; Cengage Learning. 2011. 568 pages. ISBN 978-0495916925.
- Lakota America: A New History of Indigenous Power. New Haven, CT: Yale University Press. 2019. 542 pages. ISBN 978-0300215953.
- Indigenous Continent: The Epic Contest for North America. Liveright. 2022. 571 pages. ISBN 978-1324094067
