= Jacksonian democracy =

19th-century American political ideology

Jacksonian Democrats
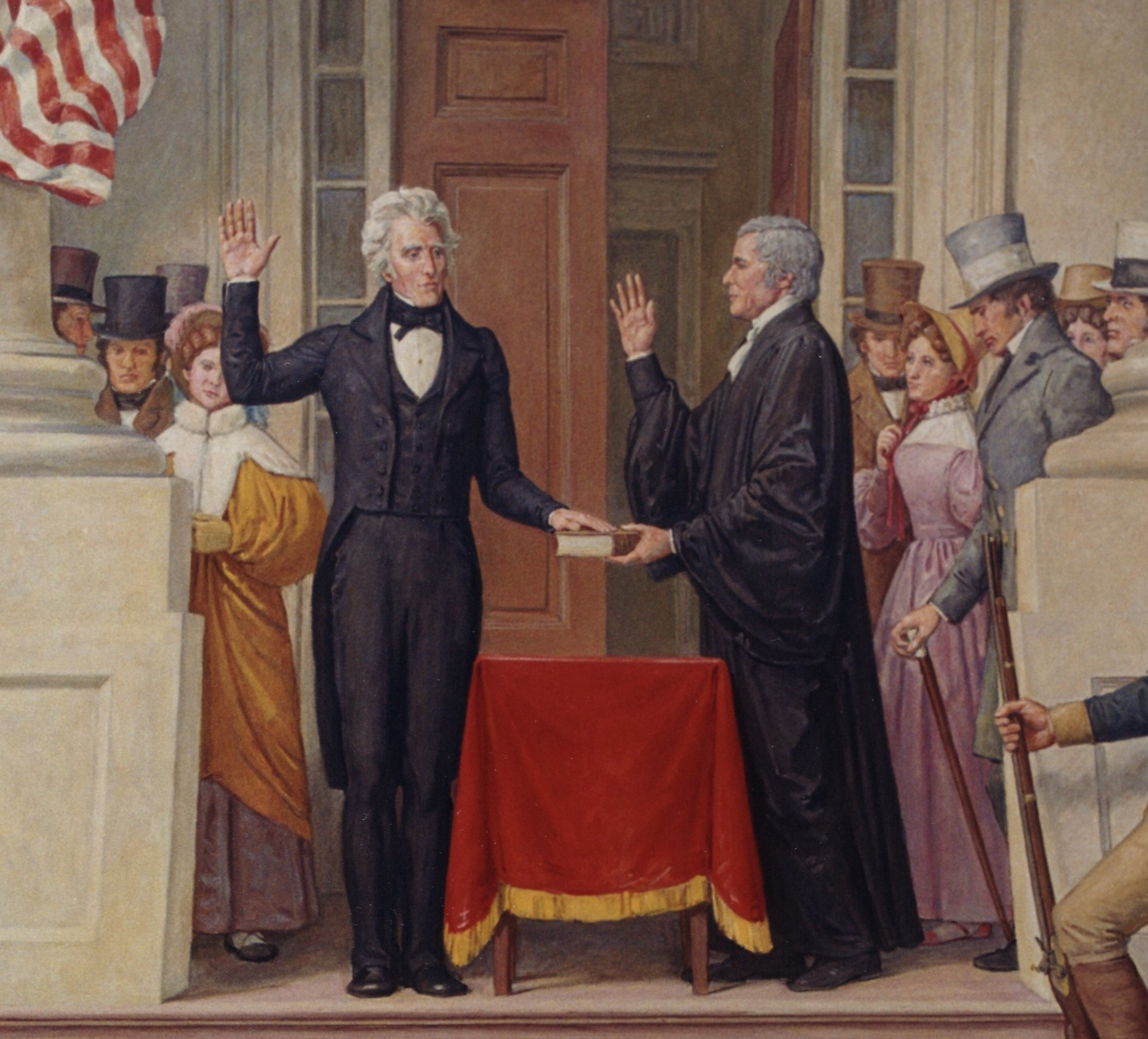
- President: Andrew Jackson (1829–1837); Martin Van Buren (1837–1841); James K. Polk (1845–1849); Franklin Pierce (1853–1857)
- Founded: 1825; 201 years ago
- Dissolved: 1854; 172 years ago
- Split from: Democratic-Republican Party
- Preceded by: Jeffersonian Republicans; Old Republicans
- Merged into: Democratic Party
- Ideology: Agrarianism; Anti-corruption; Anti-elitism; Civic engagement Classical liberalism Jeffersonianism; Direct democracy Majority rule Manifest destiny Populism; Spoils system Strict constructionism Universal white male suffrage Utilitarianism; Conservatism; Factions: Radicalism; Anti-British sentiment
- Political position: Big tent First phase: Left-wing (Note: Jacksonian Democrats championed republicanism, expanded suffrage, and a populist, anti-elitist rhetoric. In the context of 19th-century transatlantic politics, these positions aligned them with the radical left of the era, as they opposed established aristocratic privileges and conservative social hierarchies common in Europe at the time.)
- National affiliation: Democratic Party (after 1828)

Jacksonian Era
- 1829–1854
| Era of Good Feelings | Greater Reconstruction |
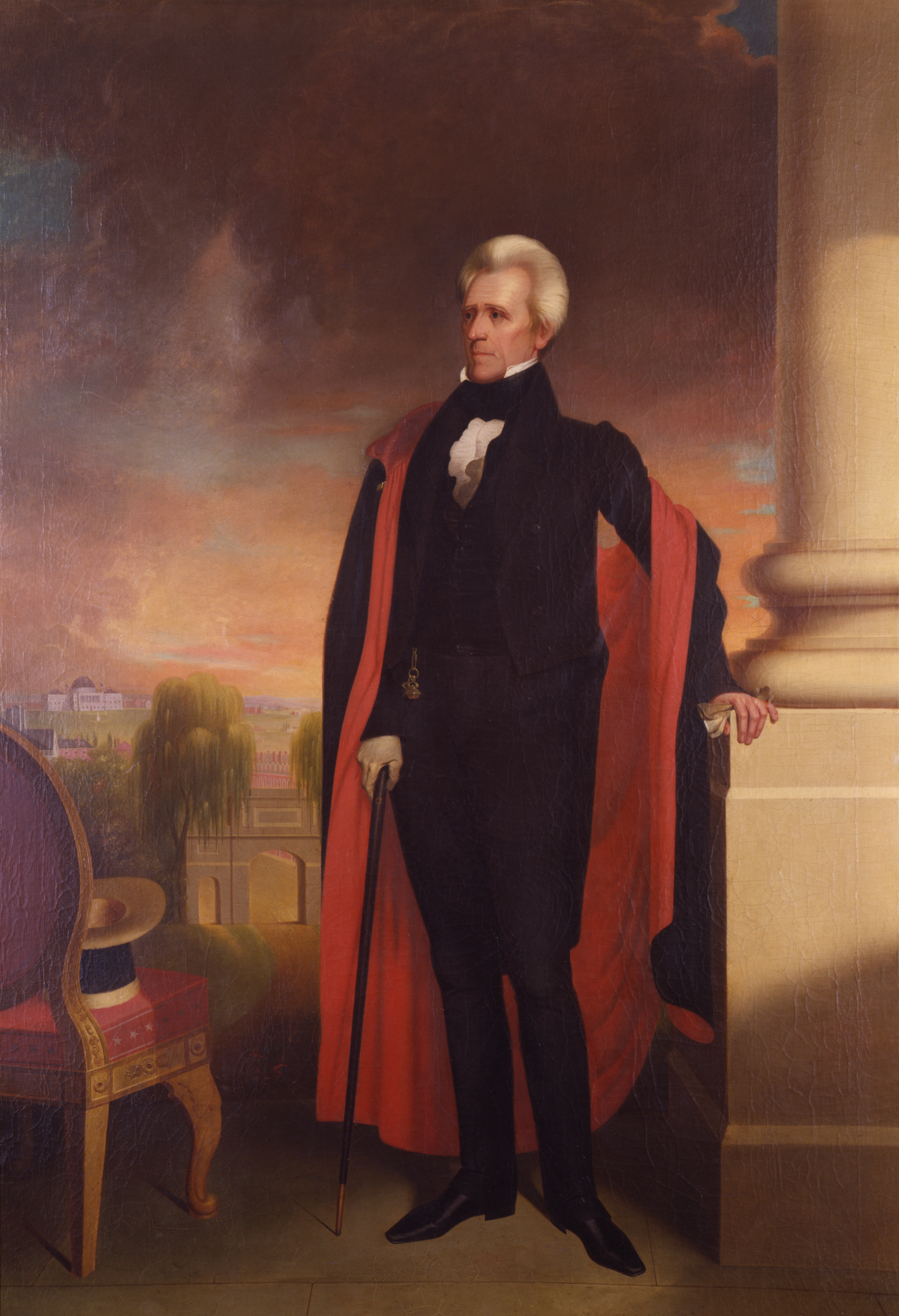
- Andrew Jackson
- Including: Antebellum South
- Presidents: Andrew Jackson; Martin Van Buren; William Henry Harrison; John Tyler; James K. Polk
- Key events: Trail of Tears; Indian removal; Nullification crisis; Second Great Awakening; Westward expansion; Mexican–American War; Prelude to the Civil War

Jacksonian democracy (or Jacksonianism) was a 19th-century American political ideology centered on expanding the political power of the "common man", opposing entrenched elites, and asserting popular control over government. Associated with Andrew Jackson and his supporters, it combined majoritarianism, democratic participation, expansion of the right to vote to non-landowning white men, hostility to certain forms of concentrated economic power (such as national banks), and a strong executive willing to act on behalf of the people. It became the nation's dominant political worldview for a generation during the 1830s. Historians and political scientists sometimes call this era the Jacksonian Era or Second Party System.

Jacksonianism emerged from the factionalization of the long-dominant Democratic-Republican Party around the 1824 presidential election, but it was also part of a broader democratic transformation already underway in American politics. Even before Jackson’s rise, suffrage had been extended to a majority of white male adult citizens, a development Jacksonians celebrated and interpreted as the end of what Jackson called a monopoly of government by elites. Jackson’s supporters organized this democratic spirit into what became the modern Democratic Party, while his political rivals John Quincy Adams and Henry Clay formed the National Republican Party, which later combined with other anti-Jackson groups to create the Whig Party. The Jacksonian movement sought to broaden public participation in government by demanding elected rather than appointed judges and by rewriting many state constitutions to reflect these new values. At the same time, it strengthened the presidency and the executive branch at the expense of Congress, presenting the president as the direct representative of the popular will. In national terms, Jacksonian democracy also favored geographical expansionism, justified through the language of manifest destiny.

Jackson's expansion of democracy was exclusively limited to white men, as well as voting rights in the nation were extended to adult white males only, and, according to historian Edward Pessen, "it is a myth that most obstacles to the suffrage were removed only after the emergence of Andrew Jackson and his party. Well before Jackson's election most states had lifted most restrictions on the suffrage for white male citizens or taxpayers."

There was little to no improvement to, and in many cases a reduction of, the rights of non-white U.S citizens during the extensive period of Jacksonian democracy, spanning from 1829 to 1860. As the nation expanded westward, this racial boundary made the question of slavery increasingly unavoidable, exposing a core tension within Jacksonian politics. Consequently, the Jacksonian Era lasted roughly until the practice of slavery became the dominant issue with the passage of the Kansas–Nebraska Act in 1854 and the political repercussions of the American Civil War dramatically reshaped American politics.

A number of academics and publications have described Donald Trump as a neo-Jacksonian populist, in relation to an absence of traditional conservative Republican principles and his executive-driven populist approach.

== Etymology ==
In its earliest usage, the phrase "Jacksonian democracy" had a narrower meaning referring to the Democratic Party, particularly as led by Andrew Jackson, who was president of the United States from 1829 to 1837. American historian James Schouler called Jackson's political alliance "the Jackson Democracy" in his 1889 History of the United States Under the Constitution, and in 1890 future president Theodore Roosevelt called the antebellum Democratic Party "the Jacksonian Democracy". Later historians, including Frederick Jackson Turner and William MacDonald, generalized the phrase "Jacksonian democracy" to describe democracy writ large in the United States and what they saw as the influence of the American frontier on the character of American political culture. In the 1945 book The Age of Jackson, Arthur M. Schlesinger Jr. influentially reinterpreted "Jacksonian Democracy" as a phenomenon of labor struggle against business power rather than of frontier regional influence.

== General principles ==
In 1999, historian Robert V. Remini stated that Jacksonian Democracy involved the belief that the people are sovereign, that their will is absolute and that the majority rules.

William S. Belko, in 2015, summarized "the core concepts underlying Jacksonian Democracy" as:

equal protection of the laws; an aversion to a moneyed aristocracy, exclusive privileges, and monopolies, and a predilection for the common man; majority rule; and the welfare of the community over the individual.

Historian and social critic Arthur M. Schlesinger Jr. argued in 1945 that Jacksonian democracy was built on the following:

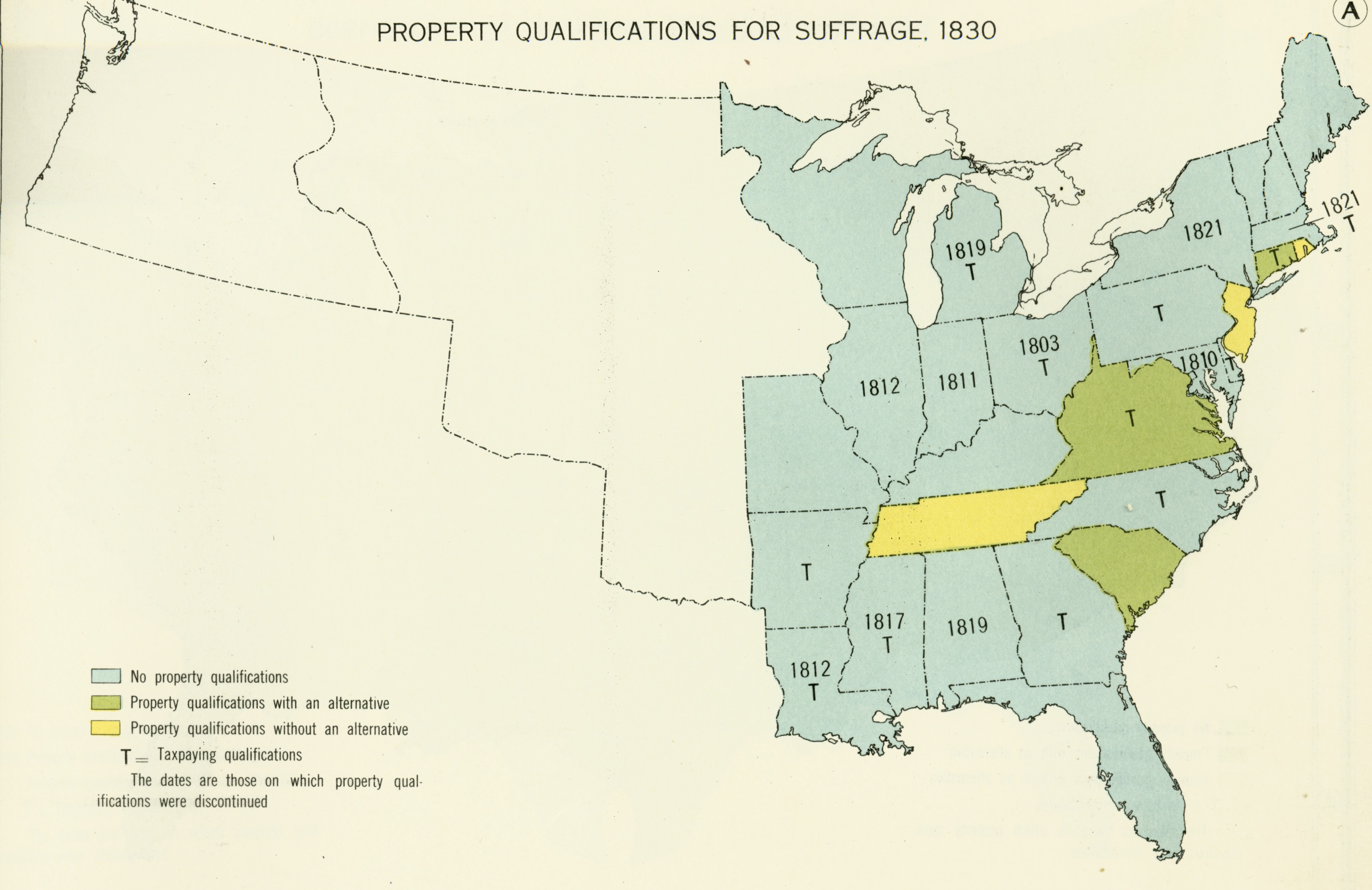
Property qualifications for suffrage 1830

- Expanded suffrage – The Jacksonians believed that voting rights should be extended to all white men. By the end of the 1820s, attitudes and state laws had shifted in favor of universal white male suffrage and by 1856 all requirements to own property and nearly all requirements to pay taxes had been dropped.
- Manifest destiny – This was the belief that Americans had a destiny to settle the American West and to expand control from the Atlantic Ocean to the Pacific, and that the West should be settled by yeoman farmers. However, the Free Soil movement, originally an offshoot of Jacksonianism, argued for limitations on slavery in the new areas to enable the poor white man to flourish — they split with the main party briefly in 1848 when nominated former President Martin Van Buren . The Whigs generally opposed Manifest Destiny and expansion, saying the nation should build up its cities.
- Patronage – Also known as the spoils system, patronage was the policy of placing political supporters into appointed offices. Many Jacksonians held the view that rotating political appointees in and out of office was not only the right, but also the duty of winners in political contests. Patronage was theorized to be good because it would encourage political participation by the common man and because it would make a politician more accountable for poor government service by his appointees. Jacksonians also held that long tenure in the civil service was corrupting, so civil servants should be rotated out of office at regular intervals. However, patronage often led to the hiring of incompetent and sometimes corrupt officials due to the emphasis on party loyalty above any other qualifications.
- Strict constructionism – Like the Jeffersonians who strongly believed in the Kentucky and Virginia Resolutions, Jacksonians initially favored a federal government of limited powers. Jackson said that he would guard against "all encroachments upon the legitimate sphere of State sovereignty". However, he was not a states' rights extremist—indeed, the nullification crisis would find Jackson fighting against what he perceived as state encroachments on the proper sphere of federal influence. This position was one basis for the Jacksonians' opposition to the Second Bank of the United States. As the Jacksonians consolidated power, they more often advocated expanding federal power, presidential power in particular.
- Laissez-faire – Complementing a strict construction of the Constitution, the Jacksonians generally favored a hands-off approach to the economy as opposed to the Whig program sponsoring modernization, railroads, banking, and economic growth. The chief spokesman amongst laissez-faire advocates was William Leggett of the Locofocos in New York City. Jackson "placed most of the American economy off limits to government regulation. Only paper money bankers faced whatever (slim) interference his bias against governmental regulation allowed. No inequality of wages, prices, profits, inheritance—of the basic structure of American capitalism—had to fear Jackson's egalitarian scorn."
- Opposition to banking – In particular, the Jacksonians opposed government-granted monopolies to banks, especially the national bank, a central bank known as the Second Bank of the United States. Jackson said: "The bank is trying to kill me, but I will kill it!" and he did so. The Whigs, who strongly supported the Bank, were led by Henry Clay, Daniel Webster, and Nicholas Biddle, the bank chairman. Jackson himself was opposed to all banks because he believed they were devices to cheat common people—he and many followers believed that only gold and silver should be used to back currency, rather than the integrity of a bank.

=== Election by "the common man" ===
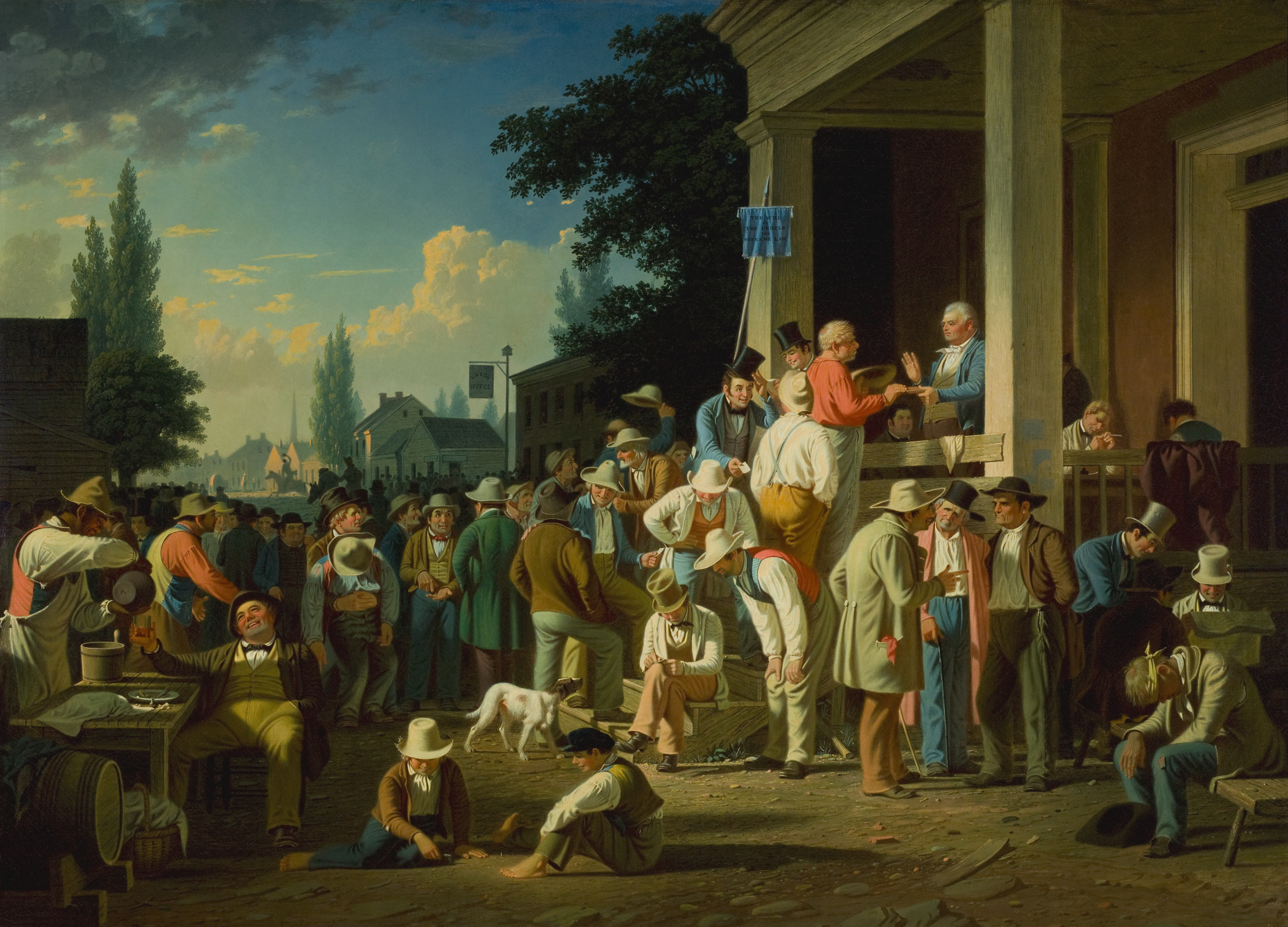
George Caleb Bingham's The County Election depicts democracy in action in Missouri c. 1852, showing an "all-male polling place where voting would go on for two or three days to allow farmers to come in to the county seat" to cast their non-secret ballots. According to the Saint Louis Art Museum, Bingham's painting uses figures ranging from a newly naturalized citizen to a grizzled veteran to a couple of local drunks to demonstrate "the democratic ideal must be embraced even though uninformed votes could prevail."

An important movement in the period from 1800 to 1830—the era immediately before the election of Jackson—was the gradual expansion of the right to vote from only property owning men to include all white men over 21. Older states with property restrictions dropped them, namely all but Rhode Island, Virginia, and North Carolina by the mid-1820s. No new states had property qualifications although three had adopted tax-paying qualifications—Ohio, Louisiana, and Mississippi, of which only in Louisiana were these significant and long lasting. The process was peaceful and widely supported, except in the state of Rhode Island. In Rhode Island, the Dorr Rebellion of the 1840s demonstrated that the demand for equal suffrage was broad and strong, although the subsequent reform included a significant property requirement for any resident born outside of the United States. However, free black men lost voting rights in several states during this period.

The fact that any man was now legally allowed to vote did not necessarily mean he routinely voted. He had to be pulled to the polls, which became the most important role of the local parties. They systematically sought out potential voters and brought them to the polls. Voter turnout soared during the 1830s, reaching about 80% of adult white male population in the 1840 presidential election. Tax-paying qualifications remained in only five states by 1860—Massachusetts, Rhode Island, Pennsylvania, Delaware and North Carolina.

One innovative strategy for increasing voter participation and input was developed outside the Jacksonian camp. Prior to the presidential election of 1832, the Anti-Masonic Party conducted the nation's first presidential nominating convention. Held in Baltimore, Maryland, September 26–28, 1831, it transformed the process by which political parties select their presidential and vice-presidential candidates.

=== Factions ===
The period from 1824 to 1832 was politically chaotic. The Federalist Party and the First Party System were dead and with no effective opposition, the old Democratic-Republican Party withered away. Every state had numerous political factions, but they did not cross state lines. Political coalitions formed and dissolved and politicians moved in and out of alliances.

More former Democratic-Republicans supported Jackson, while others such as Henry Clay opposed him. More former Federalists, such as Daniel Webster, opposed Jackson, although some like James Buchanan supported him. In 1828, John Quincy Adams pulled together a network of factions called the National Republicans, but he was defeated by Jackson. By the late 1830s, the Jacksonian Democrats and the Whigs—a fusion of the National Republicans and other anti-Jackson parties—politically battled it out nationally and in every state.

=== Race and power in the formation of political alliances ===
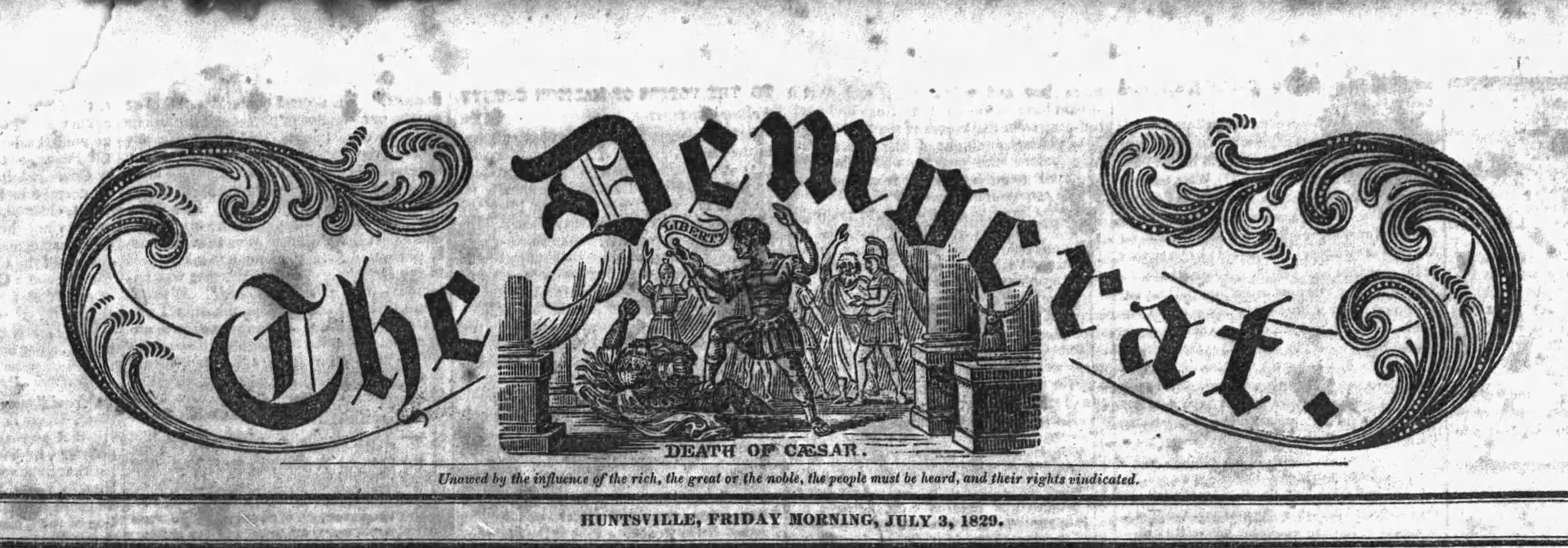
"Unawed by the influence of the great, the rich, or the noble, the people must be heard, and their rights vindicated" was the motto on the Huntsville, Alabama Democrat newspaper title-band in 1829.

According to historian Daniel Walker Howe in What Hath God Wrought: The Transformation of America, 1815–1848, Jacksonianism began with allegiance to Jackson the man. As one history put it, "While the Whigs denied it, their party really had its origin in Tennessee in opposition to Jackson." Jackson was an intensely partisan individual, in the most personal sense: his world was divided into friends to be enriched, and enemies to be extinguished. According to John Williams by way of John Floyd, "he [Jackson] never determined on the ruin of any man that he did not succeed". When Davy Crockett famously said "Since you have chosen a man with a timber toe to succeed me, you may all go to hell, and I will go to Texas", it was because Jackson had successfully sought his electoral defeat and backed his peg-legged opponent Adam Huntsman, using electioneering techniques, alleged Crockett, that were dishonorable if not explicitly corrupt. Crockett was targeted—in his words "hunted down like a wild varmint"—in part because he declined to endorse Jackson's inebriate nephew for a government job, and in part because he was the only Representative from Tennessee who voted against Indian Removal.

Because of Jackson's inherent tendency to tribalism, it was almost inevitable that he became a central figure in the expansion of the political party system in the United States. He was not only the nexus of the Democrats but played the central role of antagonist in the establishment of the Anti-Jacksonians, the Anti-Masons, and the Whigs. The Whigs were organized circa 1834, at which time "discontent with Jackson's policies and personal activities in relation to Tennessee politics had been steadily increasing, not only among certain outstanding men, but among the people of the state generally". In 1835, when Jackson revealed through a quickly-published private letter to "Indian fighter and war chaplain to chieftan Jackson" James Gwin that he wanted Martin Van Buren to succeed him as president, a Louisville newspaper explained that this signal fire had been lit in response to a Nashville newspaper editorial. The Nashville paper had made a well-intentioned inquiry: would Jackson not prefer to see his old Tennessee acquaintance Hugh Lawson White in the White House? "The poor Editor had unwittingly violated the first principles of Jackson-ism, to wit; unflinching adherence to the party candidate for office." And the party was, certainly while he lived, an extension of Jackson's inconsistent personal preferences and interests; Thomas P. Abernethy wrote in 1927, "No historian has ever accused Jackson, the great Democrat, of having had a political philosophy. It is hard to see that he even had any political principles. He was a man of action, and the man of action is likely to be an opportunist." Thus, Jacksonianism began without any given roster of principles other than Jackson's lifelong mission to extend "white supremacy across the North American continent". Jackson promoted political equality for white men, but his vision of social egalitarianism beyond that core constituency was essentially nonexistent; anyone who suggested otherwise was despised as a conniving schemer who was disrupting the natural social order for personal advantage and, surely, financial gain.

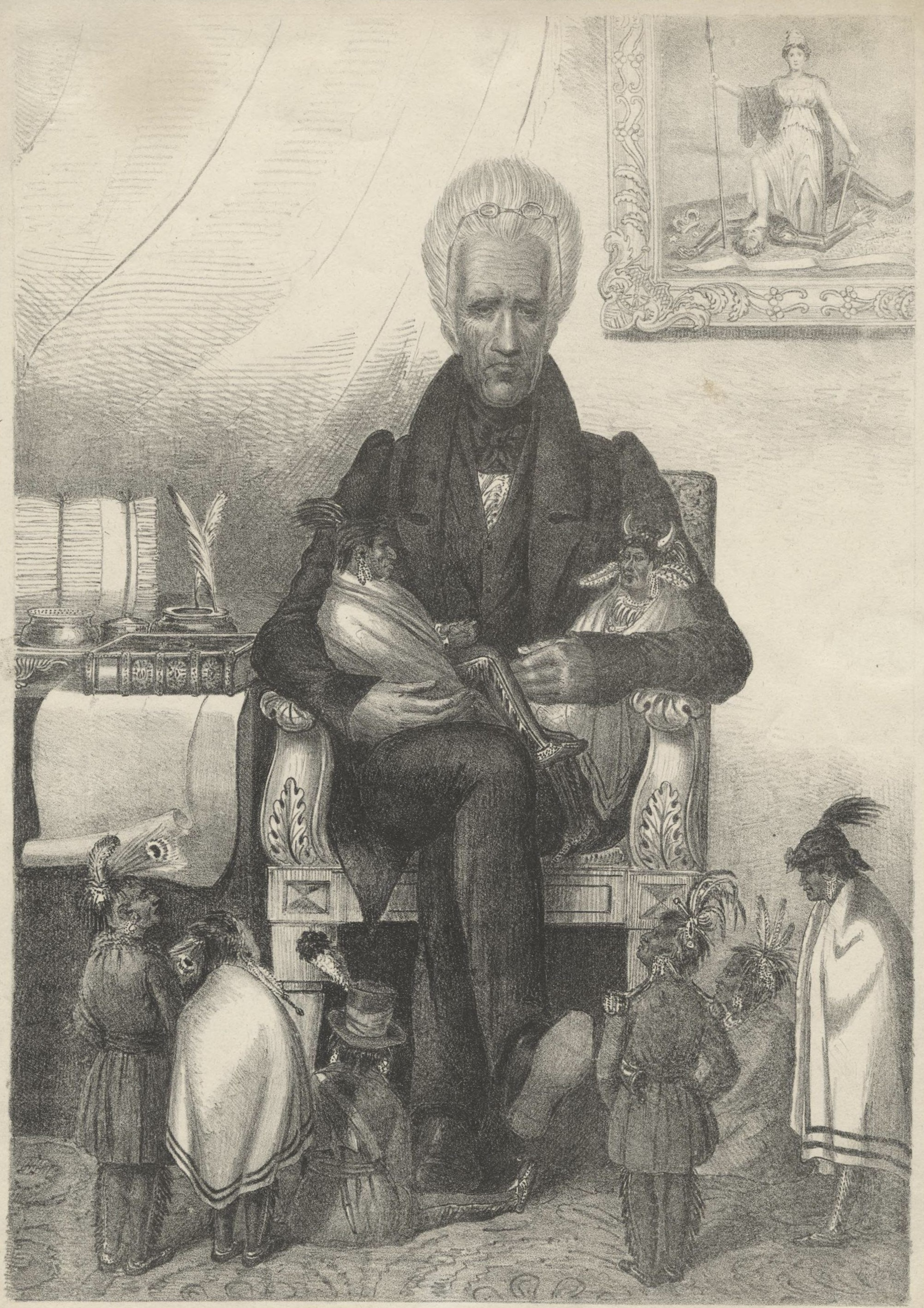
This editorial cartoon satirizes Jackson's claims to be a "Great Father" to American Indigenous people; behind him the allegorical Columbia has her foot on the neck of a dead man.

The removal of Indians from their ancestral lands, so they could be more profitably replaced by Whites and their Black slaves in what became the Cotton Kingdom, "fixed the character of his political party" such that during the Second Party System "voting on Indian affairs proved to be the most consistent predictor of partisan affiliation". According to political historian Joshua A. Lynn, "Democrats painted the political landscape as a Boschian triptych in which fiendish abolitionists, nativists, and temperance crusaders flayed men of their autonomy, manhood, and whiteness." Per Lynn, the core principles of Jacksonism were white supremacy, the perpetuation of slavery, the ethnic cleansing of unceded Indigenous land claims within the territory of the United States, and mass politics, all guided by the worldview that "white men surrendered their sovereignty in proportion to its exercise by people of color". Thus, argue some historians, the color line was the core value of the Jacksonian Democratic Party, in that whether the voters were "urban workingmen, southern planters and yeomen, or frontier settlers" they were unified by a "racial essentialism" that established whiteness as the basis for a voting bloc that might otherwise share few common interests. There has been a school of thought that conflated the Jacksonian Democratic Party with the progressive mode and the later 19th and 20th American labor movements, but historian Edward Pessen argued that Jackson's claim to the allegiances of working men should not be mistaken for an alliance between Jacksonian Age capital-D Democrats and the working class, stating that "Andrew Jackson was no special friend to labor and ... working men whether organized or unorganized were in their turn no champions of the Democracy." Thus, Jackson's great innovation was to popularize a cultural norm wherein by "superintending inequality at home ... patriarchs mingled in public as equals". As historian William Freehling put it, Jackson's beliefs "took white men's egalitarian government to its (racial) limits and far beyond the (class) limits of the Founding Fathers' aristocratic republicanism ... But his constricted definition ... excluded almost all of American social inequality from governmental assault. His limited banking reforms left Northern manufacturers and Southern slaveholders untouched. His racial agenda sanctioned governmental consolidation of reds' and blacks' natural inferiority ... This monument to American individualism had slaughtered the Bank, crushed the nullifiers, and impeded the secessionists. But that unacknowledged monster, his unimpeded racist capitalism, would haunt egalitarians for generations."

For his part, Jackson was acutely cognizant of the pro-slavery bent of his followers and saw that as a seat of power for the party. In 1840 he wrote to his nephew and political protégé Andrew Donelson about a campaign event in Madison County, Tennessee: "We had a large meeting to day. Polk and Grundy both spoke, to an attentive audience, and all things look well in this District. I have no fears of the result; the abolition question begins to draw the attention, I may say, the serious attention of the people here." When conceiving of a "start date" for the Jacksonian Era of American history, way back in 1874 Samuel Eliot suggested that 1831 was a key year. By 1831 Jackson had consolidated power (he would run again and win a second term in 1832), but Eliot suggested that the year of the Nat Turner slave rebellion and the launch of The Liberator abolitionist newspaper was the beginning of irreversible bifurcation of the body politic into pro-slavery hotheads and anti-racist radicals, and a consequent, perhaps-inevitable civil war. Certainly by the 1850s, the Democrats had become "the party of unswerving white supremacy", although the party leadership never came to any consensus on how to apply that racist philosophy to practical issues of governance.

As late as the 1950s an uneasy lack of clarity about the definition and goals of Jacksonianism led one political historian to admit that 100 years after the fact, they could only tell with certainty what it was not: "it is not suggested that any plausible editorial selection could identify Jacksonian Democracy with the rise of abolitionism; or (in an exclusive sense) with the temperance movement, school reform, religious enthusiasm or theological liberalism; or (in any sense) with Utopian community building. Yet the variety of meanings which can command some documentary support is too wide for easy assimilation in a coherent interpretation of Jacksonian Democracy. Here there is, I think, a fair field for the critical examination of the major contending theses and, of greater importance, for a fresh reading of the most obvious Jacksonian sources."

Democracy is, I know full well, a word of power. I know that it has a charm for the hopeful, the generous, the lowly, and the aspiring, as well as for many darker spirits ... I know that to be truly Democratic is of more importance than to win and wear the advantages connected with the name...of that which claims a monopoly of office and honors as the due reward of its devotion to equality, I am content to be adjudged lacking. Of that Democracy which robs the ... Mexican of half his broad domains, and regards with a covetous eye the last of Spain's declining valuable possessions—which plants its heel on the neck of the abject and powerless negro, and hurls its axe after the flying form of the plundered, homeless, and desolate Indian.—may it be written on my grave that I never was a follower, and lived and died in nothing its debtor!

— Horace Greeley, "Why I Am a Whig" (1852)

== Founding of the Democratic Party ==
=== Jacksonian democracy ===
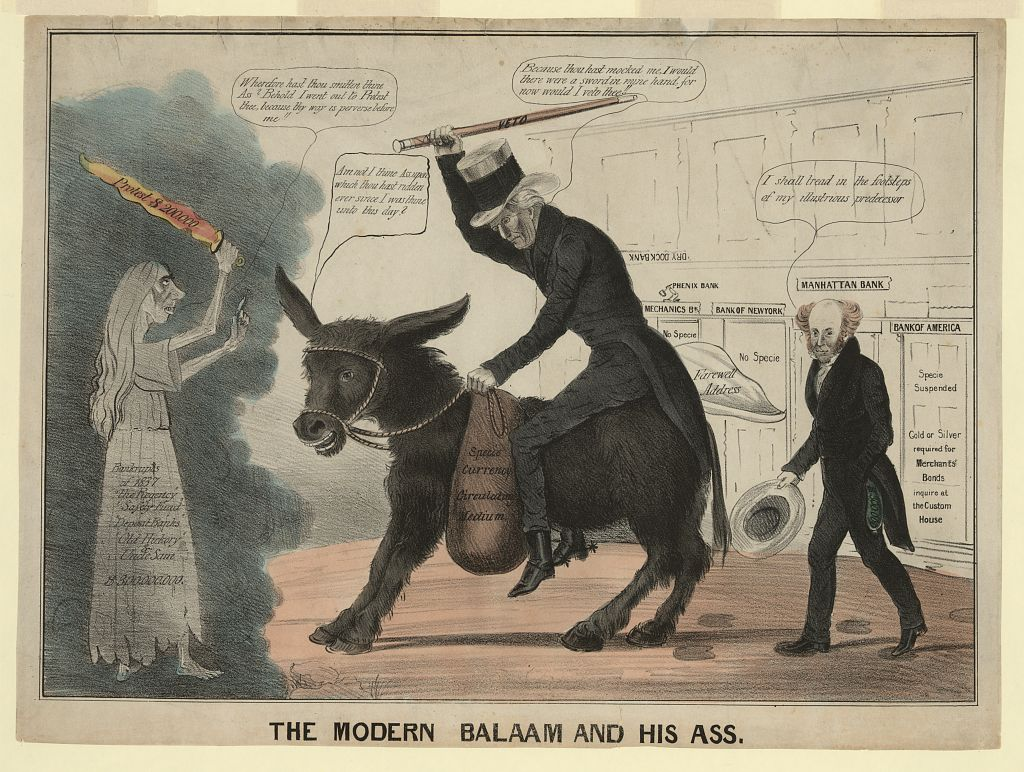
1837 cartoon playing on "Jackson" and "jackass", showing the Democratic Party as a donkey, which has remained its popular symbol into the 21st century

The spirit of Jacksonian democracy animated the party that formed around him, from the early 1830s to the 1850s, shaping the era, with the Whig Party the main opposition. The new Democratic Party was rooted in the ideals of Jeffersonian democracy and was a coalition made up of poor farmers, city-dwelling laborers and Irish Catholics.

The new party was pulled together by Martin Van Buren in 1828 as Jackson crusaded on claims of corruption by President John Quincy Adams. The new party (which did not get the name Democrats until 1834) swept to a landslide. As Mary Beth Norton explains regarding 1828:

Jacksonians believed the people's will had finally prevailed. Through a lavishly financed coalition of state parties, political leaders, and newspaper editors, a popular movement had elected the president. The Democrats became the nation's first well-organized national party.

The platforms, speeches and editorials were founded upon a broad consensus among Democrats. As Norton et al. explain:

The Democrats represented a wide range of views but shared a fundamental commitment to the Jeffersonian concept of an agrarian society. They viewed a central government as the enemy of individual liberty and they believed that government intervention in the economy benefited special-interest groups and created corporate monopolies that favored the rich. They sought to restore the independence of the individual—the artisan and the ordinary farmer—by ending federal support of banks and corporations and restricting the use of paper currency.

Jackson vetoed more legislation than all previous presidents combined. The long-term effect was to create the modern, strong presidency. Jackson and his supporters also opposed progressive reformation as a movement. Progressive reformers eager to turn their programs into legislation called for a more active government. However, Democrats tended to oppose programs like educational reform and the establishment of a public education system. For instance, they believed that public schools restricted individual liberty by interfering with parental responsibility and undermined freedom of religion by replacing church schools.

According to Francis Paul Prucha in 1969, Jackson looked at the Indian question in terms of military and legal policy, not as a problem due to their race. In 1813, Jackson adopted and treated as his own son Lyncoya Jackson, who had been orphaned by Jackson's orders to John Coffee at the Battle of Tallusahatchee during the Creek War—seeing in him a fellow orphan that was "so much like myself I feel an unusual sympathy for him". Lyncoya was one of three indigenous members of Andrew Jackson's household. Lyncoya's biography was used as a defense against charges that Jackson's Indian policies were inhumane as early as 1815, continuing and accelerating through the 1824 and 1828 presidential elections. Lyncoya died of tuberculosis during the course of the 1828 campaign, allowing his obituary to serve as a platform for such messages.

In legal terms, when it became a matter of state sovereignty versus tribal sovereignty he went with the states and forced the Indians to fresh lands with no white rivals in what became known as the Trail of Tears.

Among the leading followers was Stephen A. Douglas, senator from Illinois, who was the key player in the passage of the Compromise of 1850, and was a leading contender for the 1852 Democratic presidential nomination. According to his biographer Robert W. Johanssen:

Douglas was preeminently a Jacksonian, and his adherence to the tenets of what became known as Jacksonian democracy grew as his own career developed. ... Popular rule, or what he would later call popular sovereignty, lay at the base of his political structure. Like most Jacksonians, Douglas believed that the people spoke through the majority, that the majority will was the expression of the popular will.

=== Reforms ===
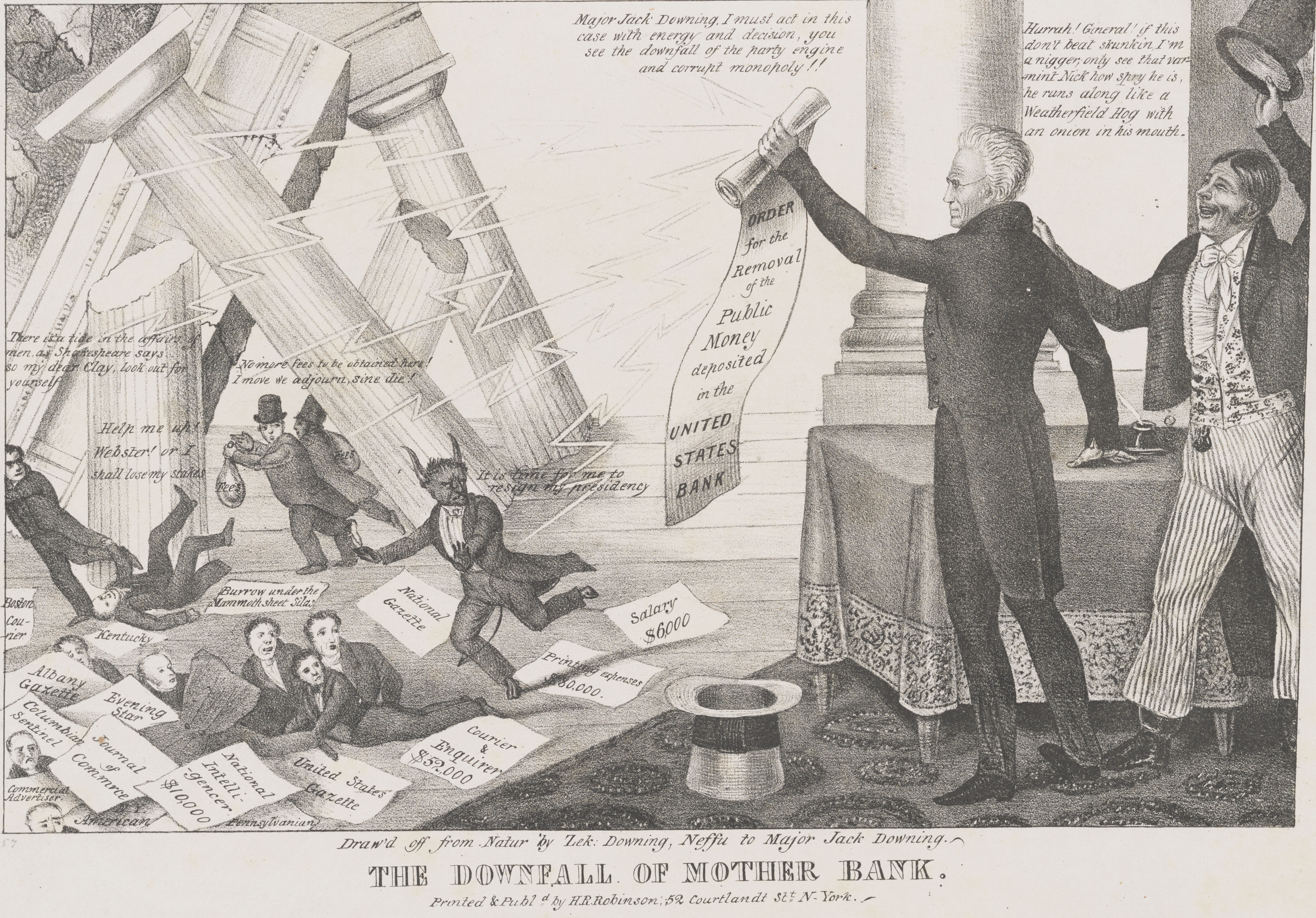
A Democratic cartoon from 1833 shows Jackson destroying the Bank with his "Order for the Removal", to the annoyance of Bank President Nicholas Biddle, shown as the Devil himself. Numerous politicians and editors who were given favorable loans from the Bank run for cover as the financial temple crashes down. A famous fictional character, Major Jack Downing (right), cheers: "Hurrah! Gineral!"

Jackson fulfilled his promise of broadening the influence of the citizenry in government, although not without vehement controversy over his methods.

Jacksonian policies included ending the bank of the United States, expanding westward and removing American Indians from the Southeast. Jackson was denounced as a tyrant by opponents on both ends of the political spectrum such as Henry Clay and John C. Calhoun. This led to the rise of the Whig Party.

Jackson created a spoils system to clear out elected officials in government of an opposing party and replace them with his supporters as a reward for their electioneering. With Congress controlled by his enemies, Jackson relied heavily on the power of the veto to block their moves.

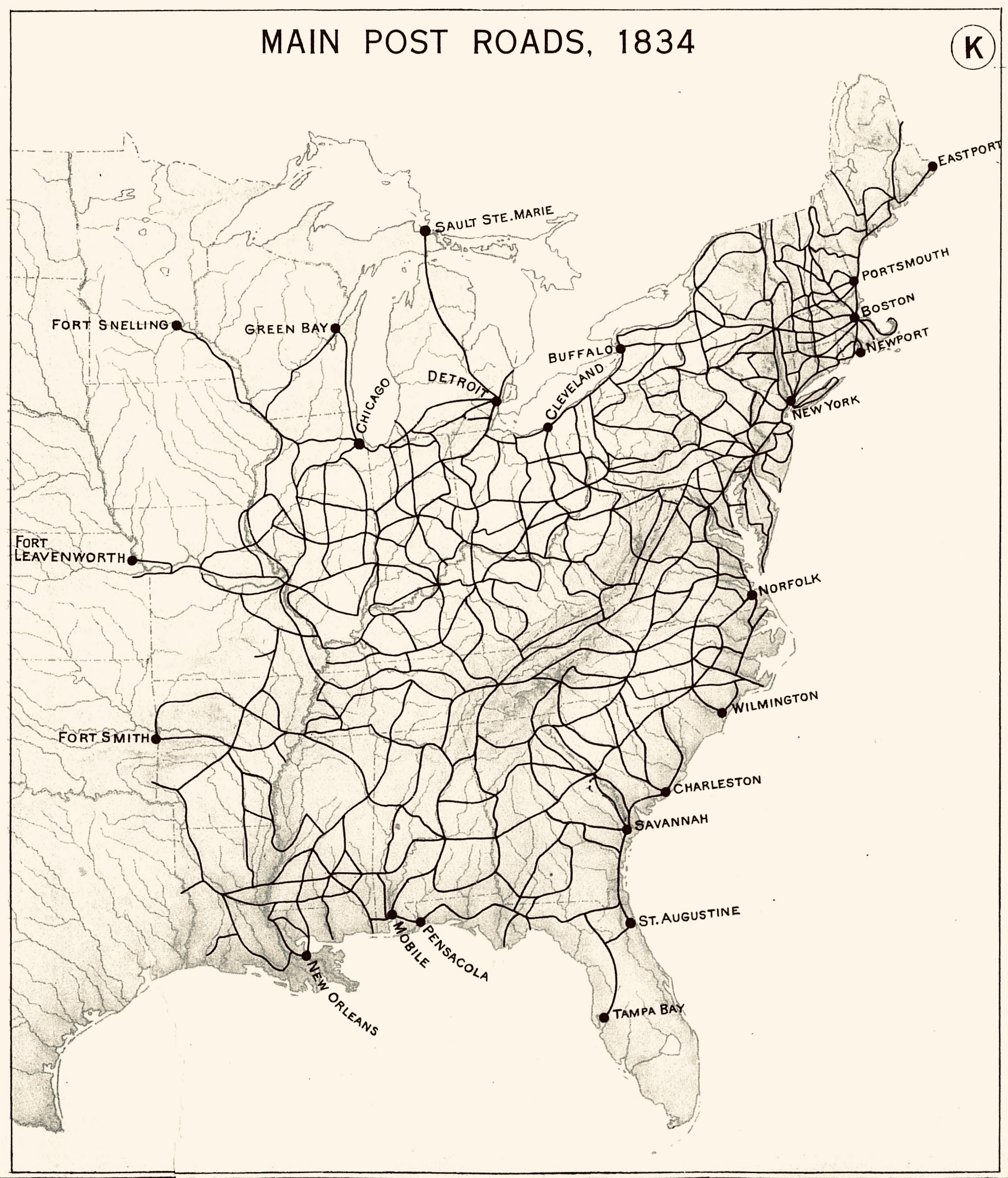
United States main postal mail roads c. 1834; the funding for the Maysville road would have improved the route from Lexington, Kentucky to the Ohio River at Maysville

One of the most important of these was the Maysville Road veto in 1830. A part of Clay's American System, the bill would have allowed for federal funding of a project to construct a road linking Lexington and the Ohio River, the entirety of which would be in the state of Kentucky, Clay's home state. His primary objection was based on the local nature of the project. He argued it was not the federal government's job to fund projects of such a local nature and/or those lacking a connection to the nation as a whole. The debates in Congress reflected two competing visions of federalism. The Jacksonians saw the union strictly as the cooperative aggregation of the individual states, while the Whigs saw the entire nation as a distinct entity.

Carl Lane argues "securing national debt freedom was a core element of Jacksonian democracy". Paying off the national debt was a high priority which would make a reality of the Jeffersonian vision of America truly free from rich bankers, self-sufficient in world affairs, virtuous at home, and administered by a small government not prone to financial corruption or payoffs.

What became of Jacksonian Democracy, according to Sean Wilentz was diffusion. Many ex-Jacksonians turned their crusade against the Money Power into one against the Slave Power and became Republicans. He points to the struggle over the Wilmot Proviso of 1846, the Free Soil Party revolt of 1848, and the mass defections from the Democrats in 1854 over the Kansas–Nebraska Act. Other Jacksonian leaders such as Chief Justice Roger B. Taney endorsed slaveholding rights through the 1857 Dred Scott ruling. Southern Jacksonians overwhelmingly endorsed secession in 1861, apart from a few opponents led by Andrew Johnson. In the North, Jacksonians Martin Van Buren, Stephen A. Douglas and the War Democrats fiercely opposed secession, while Franklin Pierce, James Buchanan and the Copperheads did not.

== Jacksonian presidents ==
Jackson's second vice president and one of the key organizational leaders of the Jacksonian Democratic Party, Martin Van Buren, handily won the election of 1836. He helped shape modern presidential campaign organizations and methods.

Van Buren was defeated in 1840 by Whig William Henry Harrison in a landslide. Harrison died just one month into his term and his vice president, John Tyler, quickly reached accommodation with the Jacksonians. Tyler was then succeeded by James K. Polk, a Jacksonian who won the election of 1844 with Jackson's endorsement. Polk was so closely aligned with Jackson he was sometimes called "Young Hickory".

Franklin Pierce had been a supporter of Jackson as well. James Buchanan, who followed Pierce as President, served as Jackson's minister to Russia and as Polk's secretary of state, but he did not pursue Jacksonian policies. However during the Panic of 1857, Buchanan acted in accordance with Jacksonian democracy principles, which restricted paper money issuance, and froze federal funds for public works projects, causing resentment among some of the population due to his refusal to implement an economic stimulus program. While the government was "without the power to extend relief", it would continue to pay its debts in specie, and while it would not curtail public works, none would be added. In hopes of reducing paper money supplies and inflation, he urged the states to restrict the banks to a credit level of $3 to $1 of specie and discouraged the use of federal or state bonds as security for bank note issues. The economy recovered in several years, though many Americans suffered as a result of the panic. Buchanan had hoped to reduce the deficit, but by the time he left office the federal budget grew by 15%.

Finally, Andrew Johnson, who had been a strong supporter of Jackson, became president following the assassination of Abraham Lincoln in 1865, but by then Jacksonian democracy had been pushed off the stage of American politics.

Donald Trump has been described as a "Jacksonian" for his similar upset victory, populist rhetoric, and opportunistic foreign policy. He also maintains a personal affinity toward President Jackson and hung his portrait in the Oval Office during his tenure as president.

== Jackson as partisan symbol ==
Jackson himself was used variously as a signifier of partisan allegiances. It was said that in Mississippi, an overwhelmingly Democratic state, "Jackson's word was 'considered as binding as the Koran, his will a rule of action—his name too sacred to be uttered without a blessing.'"

== See also ==
- Andrew Jackson 1828 presidential campaign
- History of the Democratic Party (United States)
- Jeffersonian democracy
- Native American genocide
- Populism in the United States
- Voting rights in the United States
- Herrenvolk democracy
