= The Mexican Frontier, 1821–1846 =

1982 history book by David Weber

The Mexican Frontier, 1821–1846: The American Southwest Under Mexico
- Author: David J. Weber
- Language: English
- Genre: Non-fiction
- Publisher: University of New Mexico Press
- Publication date: 1982
- Publication place: United States

The Mexican Frontier, 1821–1846: The American Southwest Under Mexico by historian David J. Weber is a history of the part of Mexico's north and northwest that became part of the United States after the Mexican–American War. The book examines territories on the northern frontier of Mexico, including what is now Arizona, California, New Mexico, and Texas, in the twenty-five years after Mexico gained its independence from Spain. Weber emphasizes the role of Mexicans in the region through this period of transition, particularly before and during the Texas war of independence, as well as exploring the region as a whole while acknowledging its distinct communities.

This book won the Ray Allen Billington Prize from the Organization of American Historians in 1983. It also won the Westerners International Co-Founders Book Award for best nonfiction of 1982, the 1982 history award from the Border Regional Library Association, and the Presidio La Bahia Award from the Sons of the Texas Republic.

== Publication ==
The book was published in 1982 by the University of New Mexico Press, as part of the Histories of the American Frontier series.

In the introduction, Weber notes that the book is in large part a synthesis of works published by other historians. This work was supplemented by additional primary materials which he discovered in the archives that allowed him to delve further into certain areas.

== Summary ==
The Mexican Frontier examines the southwestern United States, specifically the areas now known as Arizona, California, New Mexico, and Texas, in the twenty-five years between Mexico's independence from Spain and the beginning of the Mexican–American War. This resulted in the transfer of control of the border areas to the United States. In the early days of the Republic of Mexico, these areas comprised its northern border, including the territories of Alta California and Nuevo Mexico, and the province of Texas. The northern frontier developed separately from the Mexican interior, due in part to its distance from the capital in Mexico City and its relative proximity to the United States frontier and settlement by numerous English-speaking Americans. Its peoples also had to deal with dangers from increasingly hostile Indian tribes.

Weber's work follows events chronologically, examining the effects of the country's frequent shifts between federalism and centralism. Although there were many similarities among the borderlands areas, they developed independently, and the book relies on analysis of individual communities. Over time, the frontier provinces drifted further from the influence of Mexico City. Weber examines the collapse of the mission system, which caused significant social disorder in California and New Mexico. The decline of the presidio system left border residents with no protection from raids by hostile Indian tribes. Most communities reluctantly raised militias to fill the gap in defense.

Mexico continued the economic policies implemented by Spain, limiting production and import opportunities. This led to high prices and scarcities throughout the border regions, and, in part, sparked local rebellions against customs duties throughout the borderlands.

The book describes the success that the United States had in steadily pushing its frontier westward, and how American immigration into these Mexico border areas further weakened the relationship with the Mexican central government. Mexico chose to allow foreigners to settle in the border areas to encourage their development. The immigrants often ignored Mexican economic laws and introduced the free trade to which they were accustomed.

== Analysis ==
The book's overriding theme is that Mexican frontier was largely neglected due to distance and the government's inability to understand how it differed from the interior. The frontier areas suffered severe economic hardship, which led border residents to embrace trade with the United States. Traditionally, historians had seen the Mexican loss of territory through the lens of American manifest destiny; Weber instead posited that Mexican neglect was the primary cause for its losing this territory. Weber was one of the first historians to analyze the northern Mexican frontier as a single entity; previous works had limited focus to a single territory or province.

In a departure from other histories, Weber also concentrated on the native Mexicans, rather than recounting the adventures of the United States immigrants who arrived much later. This book was one of the first to incorporate the Tejano perspective into an analysis of the Texas Revolution. Previous works had focused exclusively on the United States-born settlers in Texas and had failed to note that they were supported by many Mexican-born citizens. His work also, for the first time, linked the revolution with the settlers' dissatisfaction with the extremely unstable state of Mexican politics during that era.

== Reception ==
The book was well received. In his review, historian Daniel Tyler noted that the book was "well-paced" and "established an excellent base for the study of this and other frontiers." Margaret Swett Henson lauded the book for its "felicitous writing style", which she felt would be well received by scholars and the general public.

Tyler pointed out Weber neglected to examine the lives of the Indians in the region. Ralph Vigil likewise criticized some of Weber's interpretations, including his categorization of peyote as a "'traditional' drug" and his classification of Jose Santos Gonzales as an Indian.

Historian Jesus de la Teja in 2013 described The Mexican Frontier as "the seminal study that confirmed Weber's status as the leading representative of a new kind of borderlands history", and described it as "a game changer in the field of the history of the Southwest". The book was translated into Spanish and published in Mexico and Spain. As of 2013, it was still in print.

The book won the Ray Allen Billington Prize from the Organization of American Historians in 1983, the Westerners International Co-Founders Book Award for best nonfiction of 1982, the 1982 history Award from the Border Regional Library Association, and the Presidio La Bahia Award from the Sons of the Texas Republic.

== Sources ==
- de la Teja, Jesus (2013). "David J. Weber". In Cox, Patrick L.; Hendrickson, Kenneth E. Jr. (eds.). Writing the Story of Texas. University of Texas Press. ISBN 0292748752.
- Henson, Margaret Swett (January 1986). "The Mexican Frontier, 1821-1846: The American Southwest under Mexico by David J. Weber". The Southwestern Historical Quarterly. 86 (3): 441–443.
- Tyler, Daniel (Spring 1983). "The Mexican Frontier, 1821-1846". The Journal of San Diego History. 29 (2). San Diego Historical Society.
- Vigil, Ralph H. (Summer 1984). "Review of The Mexican Frontier, 1821-1846: The American Southwest Under Mexico by David J. Weber". Great Plains Quarterly.
