= Ray Allen Billington Prize =

The Ray Allen Billington Prize is given biennially by the Organization of American Historians (OAH) for the best book about American frontier history. The "American frontier" includes all of North and South America, all post-1492 pioneer experiences, and comparisons between American frontiers and others around the world. First given in 1981, this prize honors Ray Allen Billington, OAH President (1962–1963) and prolific writer about American frontiers. A three-member committee, chosen by the OAH President for a two-year term, selects the winner who receives $1000. The first award was made posthumously to John D. Unruh who died in 1976. No award was made in 1997, and two awards were made in 1999.

The following table lists past recipients.

Year	Winner	Affiliation	Title
1981	John D. Unruh	Bluffton University	The Plains Across: The Overland Emigrants and the Trans-Mississippi West, 1840-60
1983	David J. Weber	Southern Methodist University	The Mexican Frontier, 1821-1846: The American Southwest Under Mexico
1985	Francis Paul Prucha, S.J.	Marquette University	The Great Father: The United States Government and the American Indians
1987	Paul Andrew Hutton	University of New Mexico	Phil Sheridan and His Army
1989	Albert L. Hurtado	Arizona State University	Indian Survival on the California Frontier
1991	James N. Gregory	University of Washington	American Exodus: The Dust Bowl Migration and Okie Culture in California
1993	Daniel K. Richter	University of Pennsylvania	The Ordeal of the Longhouse: The Peoples of the Iroquois League in the Era of European Colonization
1995	John Putnam Demos	Yale University	The Unredeemed Captive: A Family Story from Early America
1997	No award given		
1999co	Malcolm J. Rohrbough	University of Iowa	Days of Gold: The California Gold Rush and the American Nation
1999co	Elliott West	University of Arkansas	The Contested Plains: Indians, Goldseekers, and the Rush to Colorado
2001	Gunther Peck	Duke University	Reinventing Free Labor: Padrones and Immigrant Workers in The North American West, 1880-1930
2003	Martha A. Sandweiss	Amherst College	Print the Legend: Photography and the American West
2005	Colin G. Calloway	Dartmouth College	One Vast Winter Count: The Native American West before Lewis and Clark
2007	Pablo R. Mitchell	Oberlin College	Coyote Nation: Sexuality, Race, and Conquest in Modernizing New Mexico, 1880-1920
2009	Matthew Klingle	Bowdoin College	Emerald City: An Environmental History of Seattle
2011	Louise Pubols	Oakland Museum of California	The Father of All: The de la Guerra Family, Power, and Patriarchy in Mexican California
2013	Peter Boag	Washington State University	Re-Dressing America's Frontier Past
2015	Jared Farmer	Stony Brook University	Trees in Paradise: A California History
2017	Karl Jacoby	Columbia University	The Strange Career of William Ellis: The Texas Slave Who Became a Mexican Millionaire
2019	Elizabeth Lew-Williams	Princeton University	The Chinese Must Go: Violence, Exclusion, and the Making of the Alien in America
2021	Jeffrey Ostler	University of Oregon	Surviving Genocide: Native Nations and the United States from the American Revolution to Bleeding Kansas
2023	Paul Conrad	University of Texas at Arlington	The Apache Diaspora: Four Centuries of Displacement and Survival
2025	Alejandra Dubcovsky	University of California, Riverside	Talking Back: Native Women and the Making of the Early South

== See also ==
- List of history awards
