= Jared Farmer =

American historian (born 1974)

- Born: September 23, 1974 (age 52)
- Occupation: Historian
- Awards: Francis Parkman Prize (2009); Ray Allen Billington Prize (2015); Berlin Prize (2018)

Academic background
- Education: Utah State University (BA 1996); University of Montana (MA 1999); Stanford University (PhD 2005)

Academic work
- Institutions: Stony Brook University (2007–2020); University of Pennsylvania (2020–)

Jared Randall Farmer (born 1974) is an American historian serving as the Walter H. Annenberg Professor of History at the University of Pennsylvania. He specializes in environmental history, landscape studies, and the North American West. His book On Zion's Mount won the 2009 Francis Parkman Prize.

== Early life and education ==
Farmer was born September 23, 1974. He earned his BA from Utah State University in 1996, his MA from the University of Montana in 1999, and his PhD from Stanford University in 2005. From 2005 to 2007, he was a postdoctoral fellow at the University of Southern California.

== Career ==
In 2007, Farmer joined the history faculty at Stony Brook University. In 2020, he moved to the University of Pennsylvania, where he is the named chair Walter H. Annenberg Professor of History. In 2025, he became chair of the university's Department of History.

Farmer's book On Zion's Mount won the 2009 Francis Parkman Prize from the Society of American Historians. His book Trees in Paradise won the 2015 Ray Allen Billington Prize from the Organization of American Historians. His book Elderflora won the Jacques Barzun Prize in Cultural History from the American Philosophical Society.

In 2014, Farmer received the tenth Hiett Prize in the Humanities from the Dallas Institute. In 2017 he was named an Andrew Carnegie Fellow by the Carnegie Corporation of New York, and the following year the American Academy in Berlin awarded him a Berlin Prize. Farmer delivered the 28th annual Leonard J. Arrington Mormon History Lecture in 2023.

== Selected works ==
- Jared Farmer (1999). Glen Canyon Dammed: Inventing Lake Powell and the Canyon Country. University of Arizona Press. ISBN 978-0-8165-1887-6.
- ——— (2009). On Zion's Mount: Mormons, Indians, and the American landscape. Harvard University Press. ISBN 978-0-674-03671-0.
- ——— (2013). Trees in Paradise: A California History. W. W. Norton & Company. ISBN 978-0-393-07802-2.
- ——— (2022). Elderflora: A Modern History of Ancient Trees. Basic Books. ISBN 978-0-465-09785-2.
- ——— (2025). The Sound of Mormonism: A Media History of Latter-day Saints. USU Press. ISBN 978-1-64642-703-1.
