= Ray Allen Billington =

American historian (1903–1981)

- Born: 28 August 1903
- Died: 7 March 1981 (aged 77)
- Known for: Defense of the "Frontier Thesis"

Academic background
- Education: University of Michigan (M.A.); University of Wisconsin (PhB); Harvard University (PhD); Oxford University (M.A.)

Academic work
- Discipline: Historian, professor
- Main interests: American Frontier, American History

Ray Allen Billington (September 28, 1903 in Bay City, Michigan – March 7, 1981 in San Marino, California) was an American historian who researched the history of the American frontier and the American West, becoming one of the leading defenders of Frederick Jackson Turner's "Frontier Thesis" from the 1950s to the 1970s, expanding the field of the history of the American West. He was a co-founder of the Western History Association in 1961.

== Career ==
Billington studied at the University of Michigan, but was expelled (for a student prank). He held a Ph.B. from the University of Wisconsin (1926), an M.A. from the University of Michigan (1927), a Ph.D. from Harvard University (1933), and an M.A. from Oxford University (1953). He also received nine honorary degrees. He taught at Clark University, Smith College, Northwestern University, and served as Harold Vyvyan Harmsworth Visiting Professor of American History at Oxford University (1953–54). He retired from his teaching career in 1964 and became the Senior Research Associate at the Huntington Library.

== Personal life ==
He married Mabel R. Crotty; they had two children, Anne and Allen.

== Awards ==
- Spur Award from the Western Writers of America
- 1974 Bancroft Prize for Frederick Jackson Turner: Historian, Teacher, Scholar, Oxford University Press, 1973

== Legacy ==
To honor their former president and longtime member, the Organization of American Historians created the Ray Allen Billington Prize for the best book in American frontier history, "which is defined broadly to include the pioneer periods of all geographical areas, and comparisons between American frontiers and others." The prize has been awarded biennially since 1981, except for in 1997.

In the 1970s, Billington served as a trustee of Occidental College in Los Angeles, CA and developed an affection for the school. With funding from his estate, the college's Department of History now hosts the Ray Allen Billington Visiting Professor in U.S. History, given to honor "the tradition of fine teacher/scholars at American liberal arts colleges." The first award was given for the 1999–2000 academic year. The department has also established a Billington Student Research Fellowship to support undergraduate history students at Occidental conducting primary source research.

== Works ==
- The Protestant Crusade 1800–1860: A Study of the Origins of American Nativism (1938) (reissue Rinehart, 1952) excerpt; online
- Ray Allen Billington; Martin Ridge (2001). Westward Expansion: A History of the American Frontier. UNM Press. ISBN 978-0-8263-1981-4. (5th edition; 1st edition 1949)
- American History After 1865. Rowman & Littlefield. 1975. ISBN 978-0-8226-0026-8. (1st ed. 1950) online edition
- The Far Western Frontier Harper, 1956 online edition
- "How The Frontier Shaped The American Character", American Heritage Magazine, April 1958 online edition
- Westward Movement in the United States Van Nostrand, 1959
- "Words That Won the West", Lecture to the Public Relations Society of America, San Francisco, California, November 18, 1963 online edition
- America's Frontier Heritage Holt, Rinehart and Winston, 1963 (reprint University of New Mexico Press, 1993) online edition
- The Frontier Thesis: Valid Interpretation of American History? (editor), R. E. Krieger Pub. Co., 1966; 1977 online edition
- The American Frontier Thesis: Attack and Defense 1966 online edition
- The Genesis of the Frontier Thesis (1971)
- Frederick Jackson Turner: Historian, Scholar, Teacher. Oxford University Press, 1973 online edition
- America's Frontier Culture: Three Essays, 1977 online edition
- Limericks, Historical and Hysterical, 1981 online edition
- Land of Savagery, Land of Promise: The European Image of the American Frontier in the Nineteenth Century, 1981 online edition
