= The Rediscovery of America =

2023 book by Ned Blackhawk

The Rediscovery of America: Native Peoples and the Unmaking of U.S. History
- Author: Ned Blackhawk
- Language: English
- Publisher: Yale University Press
- Publication date: 2023
- Publication place: United States
- Pages: 616
- ISBN: 9780300244052

The Rediscovery of America: Native Peoples and the Unmaking of U.S. History is a 2023 book by historian and professor Ned Blackhawk published by Yale University Press. The book depicts the central role of Native Americans in the formation and development of the United States, a role which Blackhawk argues has been minimized or overlooked in the prevailing narrative of American history.

The book was awarded the 2023 National Book Award for Nonfiction and the Mark Lynton History Prize.

== Narrative ==
The book depicts Native American history stretching from the first arrival of European settlers to North America to the present day. During the Colonial period, European settlers violently displaced Native Americans from their lands in coastal areas. Europeans also traded with Native American tribes, trading goods including firearms in exchange for products including furs. This led to internal conflict among Native American tribes as valuable hunting territory (with the associated economic dominance derived from access to such lands) became increasingly more contested.

The book explains how the land that would become modern day Canada was ceded from the French to the British after the Seven Years' War. The Seven Years' War was followed by Pontiac's War, which was launched by Odawa chief Pontiac against the British and led to the Royal Proclamation of 1763, which prohibited settlers from moving into the interior territories. In contravention of the 1763 proclamation, White settlers continued to encroach upon Native American lands, and the United States Declaration of Independence was particularly critical of Native Americans and their perceived collusion with George III, rebuking him for his support of "merciless Indian savages", stating: "He has excited domestic insurrections amongst us, and has endeavoured to bring on the inhabitants of our frontiers, the merciless Indian Savages, whose known rule of warfare, is an undistinguished destruction of all ages, sexes and conditions. Blackhawk explains that this anti-Native American, expansionist sentiment was one of the key drivers that led to the American Revolution.

The book dispels the myth that Native peoples were quickly overrun by technologically superior European settlers. Native peoples were able retain most of their territory in the internal United States into the 19th century. However, by the early 1800s, after the American Revolution and a more robust White settler expansion westwards with financial and military support from the federal government, most Native peoples were dispossessed of their lands and forced West of the Mississippi River. With the 1871 Indian Appropriations Act, congress nullified previous treaties with Native Peoples recognizing certain areas of the country as Native American lands and granting Native Americans certain rights. This repeal of previous treaties allowed the United States to forcibly evict Native Americans from their lands. By 1880, with a newly created transcontinental railroad and a surge of settler expansion further westward, partly driven by gold, silver and copper mining, Native peoples lost their remaining lands and were relegated to living in designated reservations.

The book also depicts how in the late 1800s and early 1900s a series of American Indian boarding schools were established ostensibly with the intention of assisting Native children in assimilating to the American way of life but with the true goal of destroying Native customs and traditions. Native American activists were eventually able to petition the government to gain control of such boarding schools and relocated them closer to home. Blackhawk also documents the rise of the modern day Native American rights movement, with the Indian New Deal during the 1930s, designed to support Native American self-government and self-determination and which introduced a mandate to recognize previous treaty rights. Blackhawk also discusses the Red Power movement of the 1960s and 70s, which further advocated for the rights of Native Americans. The book also highlights modern day accomplishments in the Native American civil rights movement, including reservations gaining more economic and political influence on the national stage. Other accomplishments featured include the opening of the Smithsonian National Museum of the American Indian in Washington DC and the passage of the United Nations Declaration on the Rights of Indigenous Peoples.

== Reception ==
The Rediscovery of America won the 2023 National Book Award for Nonfiction, described by the judges as "an enlightening, transformative, and enduring work". It additionally won the 2024 Anisfield-Wolf Book Award in Nonfiction, praised for "an astonishing array of detail drawn from years of research and an estimable depth and breadth of understanding...A rare and ambitious work that interprets a vast number of societies over five centuries to argue for a reorientation of the larger national narrative". It won the 2024 Mark Lynton History Prize, and was a finalist for the 2023 Los Angeles Times Book Award in History.

Writing for The New York Times, historian Alan Taylor stated that the book "benefits from Blackhawk's wide and savvy reading of the many scholars who, during the last 50 years, have restored Native peoples to their prominent place within a fuller, richer American history." Taylor also stated that the early chapters of the book, describing the first three centuries after Columbus's landing in North America, lacked "cohesion and flow, looping back and forth in time with much repetition".

Writing for The Guardian, David Smith stated that Blackhawk was able to document U.S. history with a "wider and more inclusive lens". Writing for The Wall Street Journal, historian Kathleen DuVal stated that the work was an "eloquent and comprehensive telling of how the history of the United States and that of American Indians since the 1500s are the same story."

In The Boston Globe, David Shribman wrote, "[T]he legends about the founding and growth of the United States have been promulgated so often and so widely that Blackhawk’s conception of American history is long overdue," adding, "Ned Blackhawk has written a thoughtful, innovative, and provocative book that puts the first inhabitants of North America at the center of the history of North America."

Kirkus Reviews called it "A well-reasoned challenge for future American historians to keep Native peoples on center stage."
