= Robert M. Utley =

American historian (1929–2022)

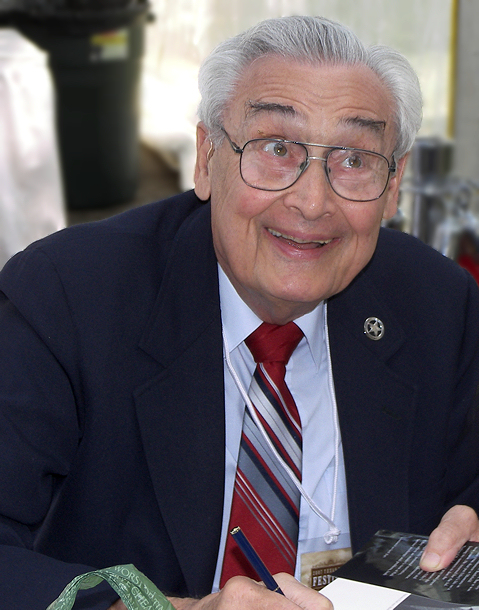
- Utley at the 2007 Texas Book Festival.
- Born: October 31, 1929; Bauxite, Arkansas, U.S.
- Died: June 7, 2022 (aged 92); Scottsdale, Arizona, U.S.
- Education: Purdue University (B.S.); Indiana University (M.A.)
- Occupation: Historian
- Spouse: Melody Webb (m. 1980)
- Writing career
- Years active: 1957–2022
- Website: www.robertutley.net

Robert Marshall Utley (October 31, 1929 – June 7, 2022) was an American author and historian who wrote sixteen books on the history of the American West. He was a chief historian for the National Park Service.

Much of his writing deals with the United States Army in the West, especially in its confrontations with the Indian tribes. He wrote:

the frontier army was a conventional military force trying to control, by conventional military methods, a people that did not behave like conventional enemies and, indeed, quite often were not enemies at all. This is the most difficult of all military assignments, whether in Africa, Asia, or the American West.

The Western History Association annually gives out the Robert M. Utley Book Award for the best book published on the military history of the frontier and western North America.

== Early life and education ==
Utley was born on October 31, 1929, in Bauxite, Arkansas. During his childhood, his parents, Don Williams Utley and Valeria Haney, moved him to northwestern Indiana, where he attended Dayton High School in Dayton, Indiana. He attended nearby Purdue University, receiving a Bachelor of Science in history. He then attended Indiana University Bloomington for graduate school, receiving a Master of Arts in history in 1952. Following graduation, he enlisted in the U.S. Army in 1952 and was commissioned a 2nd lieutenant in May 1954. After army service, he joined the National Park Service. He also served in the Army Reserves, archiving the rank of captain.

In 1997 he was awarded the Samuel Eliot Morison Prize for lifetime achievement given by the Society for Military History.

== Selected bibliography ==
- The Last Days of the Sioux Nation. Yale University Press, New Haven, Connecticut (1963).
- Frontiersmen in Blue; the United States Army and the Indian, 1848-1865. Macmillan, New York (1967).
- Frontier Regulars; the United States Army and the Indian, 1866-1891. Macmillan, New York (1973).
- Bluecoats and Redskins: The United States Army and the Indian, 1866 - 1891, Cassell (1975).
- Clash of Cultures: Fort Bowie and the Chiricahua Apaches. National Park Service Washington DC (1977).
- The Indian Frontier of the American West, 1846-1890. University of New Mexico Press (1984).
- High Noon In Lincoln: Violence on the Western Frontier. University of New Mexico Press (1987).
- The Contribution of the Frontier to the American Military Tradition (1988). The Harmon Memorial Lectures in Military History, 1959-1987. DIANE Publishing. pp. 525–34. ISBN 9781428915602.
- Cavalier in Buckskin: George Armstrong Custer and the Western Military Frontier. University of Oklahoma Press (1988).
- Utley, Robert Marshall (1989). Billy the Kid: A Short and Violent Life. University of Nebraska Press. ISBN 978-0-8032-4553-2. University of Nebraska Press (1989).
- Sitting Bull: The Life and Times of an American Patriot. Henry Holt & Company (1993). Originally published as The Lance and the Shield: The Life and Times of Sitting Bull.
- A Life Wild and Perilous: Mountain Men and the Paths to the Pacific. Henry Holt & Company (1997).
- Indian Wars. With Wilcomb E. Washburn. Houghton Mifflin Company, New York (2002). Originally published by New York: American Heritage Press, Inc., 1977.
- Lone Star Justice: The First Century of the Texas Rangers. Oxford University Press, United States (March 22, 2002).
- Lone Star Lawmen: The Second Century of the Texas Rangers. Oxford University Press, United States (January 30, 2007).
- Utley, Robert M. (2012-11-15). Geronimo. Yale University Press. ISBN 978-0-300-12638-9.(The Lamar Series in Western History). Yale University Press, (2012).
