= Francis Paul Prucha =

American historian (1921–2015)

- Born: January 4, 1921; River Falls, Wisconsin, U.S.
- Died: July 30, 2015 (aged 94); Wauwatosa, Wisconsin, U.S.
- Education: University of Wisconsin-River Falls; University of Minnesota; Harvard University; St. Louis University
- Occupations: Priest, Professor, Historian
- Website: francispaul.org

Francis Paul Prucha (January 4, 1921 – July 30, 2015) was an American historian, professor emeritus of history at Marquette University, and specialist in the relationship between the United States and Native Americans. His work, The Great Father: The United States Government and the American Indians, won the Ray Allen Billington Award and was one of the two finalists for the 1985 Pulitzer Prize in History. It is regarded as a classic among professional historians.

== Life ==
Prucha was born in River Falls, Wisconsin, the first son of Edward J. and Katharine Prucha and the older brother of John J. Prucha. He graduated from River Falls High School in 1937 as Paul Prucha and was then educated at Wisconsin State Teachers College-River Falls, which awarded him a Bachelor of Science degree in 1941. After a year and a half of high school teaching and then three-and-a-half years of service in the United States Army Air Forces, he enrolled at the University of Minnesota, where he received an M.A. degree in 1947. Harvard University awarded him a Ph.D. degree in history in 1950 under the direction of Frederick Merk. His dissertation, a study of the role of the peacetime army in the settlement process, was published in 1953 as Broadax and Bayonet: The Role of the United States Army in the Development of the Northwest, 1815-1860.

Prucha was a Jesuit; he joined the Society of Jesus in 1950 and was ordained in 1957 after studying at Saint Louis University and Saint Mary's College in Kansas. Three years later, he began teaching at Marquette and is remembered by generations of alumni as a model of the teacher-scholar. He became a priest with the name "Father Francis Paul Prucha, S.J." in 1957. From 1960 until his retirement he was on the history faculty at Marquette University. He served as visiting professor at the University of Oklahoma and at Harvard and was the Gasson Professor at Boston College. When the editor of Marquette Magazine asked readers to write about their greatest teachers, Prucha was identified among a group of classroom legends for instilling a love of learning in students.

In the late 1960s, while studying under a Guggenheim Fellowship, Prucha began work on a comprehensive history of US Indian policy. His research culminated with the two-volume The Great Father: The United States Government and the American Indians. The book was a finalist for the Pulitzer Prize in history in 1985 and is regarded as a classic among professional historians. The Great Father was awarded the Billington Prize by the Organization of American Historians in 1985. The recipient of six honorary degrees, Prucha was awarded his emeritus appointment in 1988.

Prucha died at the St. Camillus Jesuit Community in Wauwatosa, Wisconsin. At 94 years of age he was the oldest member of the Wisconsin Province. He was a Jesuit for 64 years and a priest for 58 years.

== Scholarship ==
Prucha was a member of the Western History Association, serving on the editorial board of the Western Historical Quarterly and as the association's 22nd president in 1982–83. Marquette University's Archives and Special Collection's reading room in its Raynor Library was named in his honor. Prucha was also inducted into the Milwaukee Central Library's Wisconsin Writers Wall of Fame. In 1987, he became a Fellow of the Society of American Historians in recognition of a lifetime of scholarship characterized by "literary distinction" and "scholarly merit".

== Reception ==
Prucha's books have been praised for their thorough scholarship, but also attacked for their alleged favorable treatment of government officials, such as President Andrew Jackson. Prucha's interpretation challenged previous accounts of Jacksonian racism, treachery and oppression. Attacks from his detractors made Prucha broaden his research interests and accumulate more evidence to support his views. He refined and expanded previous interpretations in a variety of writings. Overall, Prucha's evaluation has been viewed favorably, and his study, Andrew Jackson's Indian Policy: A Reassessment, has been dubbed as "the best defense of Jackson's Indian policy". Biographer Jon Brudvig summarizes Prucha's interpretation of that government policy:

Prucha's survey portrayed natives and Europeans clashing from the earliest period of cultural contact. To protect the American Indians, Prucha demonstrated how public officials use their authority to guard Indians against the destructive forces of the dominant culture. Prucha calls this paternalism, "a determination to do what was best for the Indians according to white norms, which translated into protection, subsistence of the destitute, punishment of the unruly, and eventually taking Indians by the hand and leading them along the path to white civilization and Christianity."

On the other hand, Edward Pessen found the "Reassessment" article to be "standing lonely in its favorable appraisal of Jacksonian policy" and "an essay I find altogether unconvincing, if reflective of the gentlemanly traits of its author."

== Honorary degrees ==
- Doctor of Humane Letters, Le Moyne College, 1974.
- Doctor of Humane Letters, Creighton University, 1978.
- Doctor of Laws, Merrimack College, 1985.
- Doctor of Letters, Marquette University, 1988.
- Doctor of Humane Letters, Loyola University Chicago, 1992.
- Doctor of Humane Letters, College of the Holy Cross, 1992.

== Books ==
- The Great Father: The United States Government and the American Indians ISBN 978-0-8032-8712-9 (Winner of the Ray Allen Billington Award)
- The Churches and the Indian Schools, 1888-1912 ISBN 0-8032-3657-3
- American Indian Policy in Crisis: Christian Reformers and the Indian, 1865-1900 ISBN 0-8061-1279-4
- American Indian Treaties: The History of a Political Anomaly ISBN 978-0-520-08531-2
- Indian Peace Medals in American History ISBN 978-0-8061-3218-1
- Broadax and Bayonet: The Role of the United States Army in the Development of the Northwest, 1815-1860 ISBN 978-0-8032-5151-9
- Documents of United States Indian Policy: Third Edition ISBN 978-0-8032-3728-5
- The Sword of the Republic: The United States Army on the Frontier 1783-1846 ISBN 978-0-8032-3676-9
- Indian policy in the United States: historical essays ISBN 978-0-8032-3662-2

== Archival collections ==
Prucha was instrumental in acquiring for Marquette University the records of the Bureau of Catholic Indian Missions. There is also a collection that relates purely to Prucha and his work. The archival collections of Francis Paul Prucha includes his correspondence, books (1950–2002), articles, book reviews (1942–2002), public talks and lectures (1956–1998), courses taught (1952–1987), awards and honors (1971–2003), professional activities, research fellowships and grants (1954–2003), personal papers (1927–1993), and research materials (1955–2003).

== See also ==
- Advisory Council on California Indian Policy
- Marquette University
- Marquette University Special Collections and University Archives
