= Education for Extinction =

Book on U.S. attempts to assimilate Native Americans

- Author: David Wallace Adams
- Language: English
- Genre: History
- Published: 1995
- ISBN: 978-0-70-060838-6
- OCLC: 421923293

Education for Extinction: American Indians and the Boarding School Experience, 1875–1928 is a 1995 history book by David Wallace Adams that covers the history of assimilation era American Indian boarding schools.

== Synopsis ==
Education for Extinction is an exhaustive history of assimilation era American Indian education, particularly its boarding schools. Adams contends that boarding schools were the federal government's key means for addressing its American Indian issues, and that the schools left a "psychological and cultural mark" on Indian students even while they failed at assimilation. He uses published primary and secondary archival sources as evidence combined with anthropological theory. The book is divided into four sections: education as the assimilation program's center, American Indian perspective of the program's impact, an analysis of American Indian reaction to boarding schools, and American Indian post-educational experiences and reformer reflections.

Reformers sought to change their role from civilizers to assimilators when reservation conditions crumbled. This plan for assimilation included provision of dedicated lands, and new legal and educational systems, including common schools, day schools on reservation, and boarding schools both on and off reservation. Adams describes boarding schools that "alienated those it claimed to serve" as its "total institution" nature provided acculturation outside standard curriculum. While students received instruction in the three Rs and in farming and domestic areas, Adams shows practices that targeted the students cultures including haircuts, restriction of native language and names, and school uniforms. With regard to reformer intent, he summarizes that the "only way to save Indians was to destroy them (culturally)". Adams details the complex reaction to the schools, from hiding children to arguing over certain rules, and the overall acquiescence to the federal role. While students expected to become literate and learn new technologies, they often fell ill or died and received fewer benefits than they were promised. Adams finds more criticism from lack of "adequate and responsive instruction" than he does towards the schools as a system.

== Reception ==
John W. Heaton, writing for Montana: The Magazine of Western History, praised Adams's balanced presentation between those who assented to the treatment and those children who lived it. Heaton criticized the book's lack of new interpretations and conclusions about American Indian education, and its time period's lack of contextualization within the broader history of policy relations. He added that the ultimate relationship between policy, ideology, and the student experience was unclear. Heaton recommended the book as an introduction to American Indian education. In Minnesota History, Wilbert H. Ahern praised Adams' handling of the complex American Indian reaction to boarding schools, and complained that the author didn't cover "the erosion of educational services" well, as declining per pupil expenditures further hurt families' request for more responsiveness. Donal Lindsey for The American Historical Review called the book "the most comprehensive examination of all federal Indian boarding schools to date". He complemented the book's detail, challenged the author's closeness to the subject, and ultimately proclaimed Adams "the top of his field".

== See also ==
- Cultural genocide
