= Ned Blackhawk =

American historian

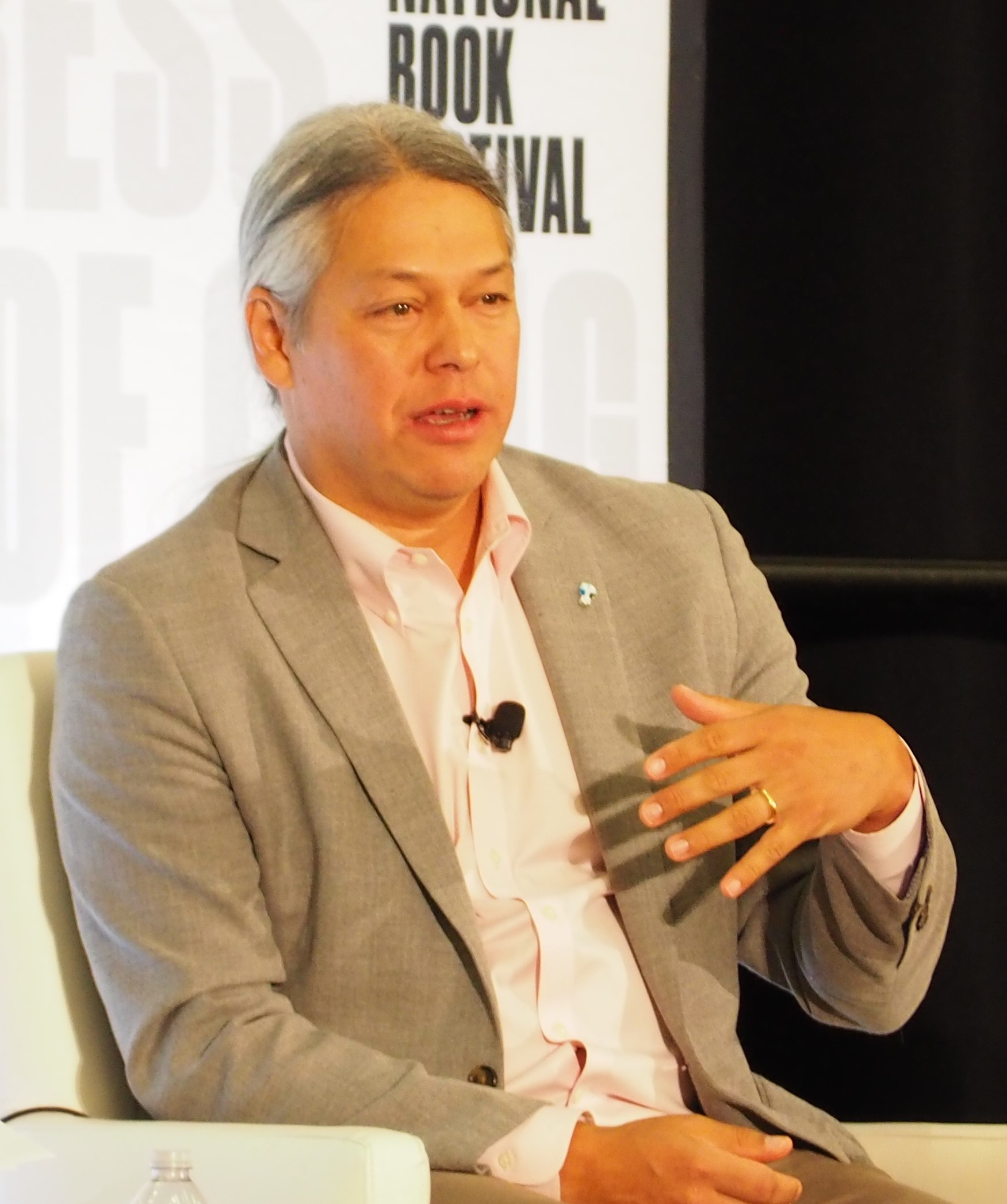
- Occupations: Non-fiction writer and ASM speaker
- Awards: National Book Award for Nonfiction (2023)

Academic background
- Education: McGill University; University of California, Los Angeles; University of Washington

Academic work
- Discipline: American Indian studies
- Institutions: University of Wisconsin–Madison; Yale University

Ned Blackhawk is a Western Shoshone-American historian at Yale University. In 2007 he received the Frederick Jackson Turner Award and the Robert M. Utley Prize for his first major book, Violence Over the Land: Indians and Empire in the Early American West (2006). He also received the National Book Award for Nonfiction (2023) and Mark Lynton History Prize (2024) for The Rediscovery of America: Native Peoples and the Unmaking of U.S. History (2023).

== Life ==
Blackhawk is of the Te-Moak Tribe of Western Shoshone Indians of Nevada, but grew up as an "urban Indian" in Detroit, Michigan. He attended the University of Detroit Jesuit High School, graduating in 1989, and then McGill University, graduating in 1992 with a Bachelor's in history. He earned his master's in history in 1994 from the University of California, Los Angeles, and his Ph.D. in history in 1999 from the University of Washington.

He first taught American Indian Studies at the University of Wisconsin–Madison where he was on the faculty from 1999 to 2009.

In the fall of 2009, Blackhawk joined the faculty of Yale University, where he is affiliated with the History and American Studies departments. He is one of three Yale professors who are American Indian. The other Yale professors are Hiʻilei Hobart and Tarren Andrews. Blackhawk is also affiliated with the Yale Group for the Study of Native America.

Blackhawk served until 2011 on the Managing Board of the American Quarterly, the journal of the American Studies Association. In 2012 Blackhawk joined the advisory board of the International Museum for Family History.

Blackhawk's 2023 book The Rediscovery of America: Native Peoples and the Unmaking of U.S. History, which depicts the history of Native Americans in the United States from European colonization to the present day, was well received and was awarded the 2023 National Book Award for Nonfiction.

Ned is married to NYU professor of law, Maggie Blackhawk.

== Awards ==
- 2024 Mark Lynton History Prize for The Rediscovery of America: Native Peoples and the Unmaking of U.S. History
- 2023 National Book Award for Nonfiction for The Rediscovery of America: Native Peoples and the Unmaking of U.S. History
- 2007 Frederick Jackson Turner Award and the Robert M. Utley Prize for Violence Over the Land: Indians and Empire in the Early American West (2006)
- 1996–1997 Katrin H. Lamon Resident Scholar

== Books ==
- The Rediscovery of America: Native Peoples and the Unmaking of U.S. History (The Henry Roe Cloud Series on American Indians and Modernity). Turtle Island: Yale University Press. 2023. ISBN 9780300244052.
- Violence Over the Land: Indians and Empire in the Early American West. Harvard University Press. 2008 [2006]. ISBN 978-0-674-02720-6.
- The Shoshone. Austin, TX: Raintree Steck-Vaughn. 2000. ISBN 0-8172-5468-4.- for young adults
- Violence Over the Land: Colonial Encounters in the American Great Basin, University of Washington, 1999
