= Elliott West =

American historian and author (born 1945)

William Elliott West (born April 19, 1945) is an American historian and author. He studies the history of the American West and taught as a distinguished professor at the University of Arkansas 1979–2022. His book The Contested Plains: Indians, Goldseekers, and the Rush to Colorado won the 1999 Francis Parkman Prize and shared the 1999 Ray Allen Billington Prize. His Continental Reckoning: The American West in the Age of Expansion won the 2024 Bancroft Prize and was a finalist for the 2024 Pulitzer Prize for History. He is a past president of the Western History Association.

== Early life and education ==
West was born on April 19, 1945, and grew up in a family of journalists. His father was an editor for the Dallas Morning News, and his brother was a travel writer. West received an undergraduate degree in journalism at the University of Texas at Austin. West completed master's and doctoral degrees at the University of Colorado Boulder. He said that he applied to Colorado because he liked the state, and although he applied to the school's history program, he was still planning to become a journalist.

== Career ==
Early in his career, West taught at the University of Colorado Denver, the University of Texas at Arlington and the University of New Mexico. He became a faculty member at the University of Arkansas in 1979, where he became an Alumni Distinguished Professor of History before retiring emeritus in 2022.

Historian Richard White has referred to West as "the best historian of the American West writing today." West's 1998 book, The Contested Plains: Indians, Goldseekers, and the Rush to Colorado, was reviewed in the Journal of Interdisciplinary History and the Pacific Historical Review. The work won the 1999 Francis Parkman Prize from the Society of American Historians and shared the Ray Allen Billington Prize from the Organization of American Historians that year. A 2009 book, The Last Indian War: The Nez Perce Story, was reviewed in The Journal of American History.

In 2009, he was a finalist for the Cherry Award for Great Teaching given by Baylor University. He has received two Western Heritage Awards. He is a past president of the Western History Association.

West appeared in the 2023 Ken Burns documentary The American Buffalo.

West's book Continental Reckoning: The American West in the Age of Expansion won the 2024 Bancroft Prize and was a finalist for the 2024 Pulitzer Prize for History.
