= Western History Association =

American historical society

- Formation: 1961
- Founder: Ray Allen Billington
- Founded at: Santa Fe, New Mexico, United States
- Type: NGO, Nonprofit
- Headquarters: Lawrence, Kansas
- Location: United States
- Executive Director: Elaine Marie Nelson
- Main organ: The Western Historical Quarterly
- Website: https://www.westernhistory.org/

The Western History Association (WHA), a 501(c)(3) non-profit organization, was founded in 1961 at Santa Fe, New Mexico by Ray Allen Billington, et al. Included in the field of study are the American West and western Canada. The Western History Association was headquartered from 2012 to 2017 at the University of Alaska, Fairbanks. From 2018 to 2020 the WHA was hosted on the campus of the University of Nebraska at Omaha. In 2020, the WHA relocated to the Department of History at the University of Kansas, where it receives support from the College of Liberal Arts and Sciences.

== History ==
In 1964 WHA began publication at the University of Utah Press, with a full run of four issues, and then in 1965 contracted Sunset publishing to print the quarterly called Nebraska, edited by A. R. Mortensen. The WHA's publications now include the Western Historical Quarterly. The association offers several annual and biennial prizes for essays and books, including the annual Caughey Western History Association Prize for the best book of the year in Western History and the Robert M. Utley Book Prize for the best book published on the military history of the frontier and western North America (including Mexico and Canada) from prehistory through the 20th century. Awarded since 2003, past recipients include Ned Blackhawk, Amy S. Greenberg and Ari Kelman.

The Autry Public History Prize is awarded annually for a media exhibit, public program, or written work that best models professional public history practice in the history of the American West.

== The Western Historical Quarterly ==
The Western Historical Quarterly (WHQ) has been the official journal of the WHA since its founding in 1969. The journal now "presents original articles dealing with the North American West—expansion and colonization, indigenous histories, regional studies (including western Canada, northern Mexico, Alaska, and Hawaii), and transnational, comparative, and borderland histories." In addition, it provides a field notes section about Western history in applied situations, as well as book reviews, and notices of recent publications about the American West.

== See also ==
- List of history awards
