= Bibliography of American history =

This is a bibliography of selected publications on the history of the United States.

== Books ==
- Agnew, Jean-Christophe; Rosenzweig, Roy, eds. (2006). A Companion to Post-1945 America.
- Alden, John R. (1966). A history of the American Revolution. Knopf.
- Atkinson, Rick (2019). The British Are Coming: The War for America, Lexington to Princeton, 1775–1777. Henry Holt and Company. ISBN 9781627790444.
- Bailey, Thomas A. (1980). A Diplomatic History of the American People (10th ed.). Prentice-Hall. ISBN 9780132147262.
- Boehm, Lisa Krissoff; Corey, Steven Hunt (2014). America's Urban History.
- Boyer, Paul, ed. (2001). The Oxford companion to United States history. Oxford University Press. ISBN 978-0-19-508209-8.
- Burns, Ken; Steisel, Susanna; Lee, Brian; Blistein, David (2022). Our America : a photographic history. New York: Knopf. ISBN 978-0-385-35301-4. OCLC 1294921946.
- Chambers, John Whiteclay, ed. (2000). The Oxford Companion to American Military History. ISBN 978-0-19-507198-6.
- Chenault, Mark; Ahlstrom, Rick; Motsinger, Tom (1993). In the Shadow of South Mountain: The Pre-Classic Hohokam of 'La Ciudad de los Hornos', Part I and II.
- Coffman, Edward M. (1998). The War to End All Wars: The American Military Experience in World War I.
- Presidential elections, 1789–1996. Congressional Quarterly. 1997. ISBN 9781568020655.
- Cooper, John Milton (2001). Breaking the Heart of the World: Woodrow Wilson and the Fight for the League of Nations. Cambridge University Press. ISBN 9780521807869.
- Corbett, P. Scott; Janssen, Volker; Lund, John M.; Pfannestiel, Todd; Waskiewicz, Sylvie; Vickery, Paul (June 26, 2020). "3.3 English settlements in America. The Chesapeake colonies: Virginia and Maryland. The rise of slavery in the Chesapeake Bay Colonies". U.S. history. OpenStax. Archived from the original on August 8, 2020.
- Croly, Herbert (1909). The Promise of American Life. The MacMillian Company.
- Cruse, Harold (1967). The Crisis of the Negro Intellectual: A Historical Analysis of the Failure of Black Leadership.
- Dangerfield, George (1963). The Era of Good Feelings: America Comes of Age in the Period of Monroe and Adams Between the War of 1812, and the Ascendancy of Jackson.
- Day, A. Grove (1940). Coronado's Quest: The Discovery of the Southwestern States. Archived from the original on July 26, 2012 – via Questia.
- Diner, Hasia, ed. (2010). Encyclopedia of American Women's History.
- Evans, Sara M. (1997). Born for Liberty: A History of Women in America. Free Press. ISBN 0029029902.
- Fiege, Mark (2012). The Republic of Nature: An Environmental History of the United States.
- Gaddis, John Lewis (1972). The United States and the Origins of the Cold War, 1941–1947. Columbia University Press. ISBN 9780231122399.
- Gaddis, John Lewis (1989). The Long Peace: Inquiries Into the History of the Cold War.
- Gaddis, John Lewis (2005). The Cold War: A New History.
- Gerber, David A. (2011). American Immigration: A Very Short Introduction.
- Gerstle, Gary (2022). The Rise and Fall of the Neoliberal Order: America and the World in the Free Market Era. Oxford University Press. ISBN 978-0197519646.
- Goldfield, David, ed. (2006). Encyclopedia of American Urban History.
- Goodman, Paul. The First American Party System. in Chambers, William Nisbet; Burnham, Walter Dean, eds. (1967). The American Party Systems: Stages of Political Development.
- Gray, Edward G., ed. (2012). The Oxford Handbook of the American Revolution.
- Greene, John Robert (1995). The Presidency of Gerald R. Ford.
- Greene, Jack P. & Pole, J. R., eds. (2003). A Companion to the American Revolution (2nd ed.). Wiley. ISBN 9781405116749.
- Guelzo, Allen C. (2012). "Chapter 3–4". Fateful Lightning: A New History of the Civil War and Reconstruction. Oxford University Press, USA. ISBN 9780199843282.
- Guelzo, Allen C. (2006). Lincoln's Emancipation Proclamation: The End of Slavery in America.
- Hartz, Louis (1955). The Liberal Tradition in America.
- Hine, Robert V.; Faragher, John Mack (2000). The American West: A New Interpretive History. Yale University Press.
- Hitchcock, William I. (2018). The Age of Eisenhower: America and the World in the 1950s. Simon & Schuster.
- Horton, James Oliver and Lois E. Horton. (2002). Hard Road to Freedom: The Story of African America.
- Howe, Daniel Walker (2007). What Hath God Wrought: The Transformation of America, 1815–1848. Oxford History of the United States. New York: Oxford University Press. ISBN 978-0-19-507894-7.
- Hopkins, A. G. (2018). American Empire: A Global History. Princeton University Press. ISBN 9780691177052.
- Hornsby, Alton Jr. (2008). A Companion to African American History.
- Jacobs, Jaap (2009). The Colony of New Netherland: A Dutch Settlement in Seventeenth-Century America (2nd ed.). Cornell University Press. Archived from the original on July 29, 2012 – via Questia.
- Jensen, Richard J.; Davidann, Jon Thares; Sugital, Yoneyuki, eds. (2003). Trans-Pacific relations: America, Europe, and Asia in the twentieth century. Greenwood.
- Johnson, Thomas H., ed. (1966). The Oxford companion to American history. Oxford University Press. ISBN 9780195005974.
- Johnson, Paul (1999). A history of the American people (1st HarperPerennial ed.). HarperPerennial. ISBN 0060930349. OCLC 40984521.
- Kammen, Michael G., ed. (1980). The Past before us: Contemporary historical writing in the United States. Cornell University Press. ISBN 9780801412240.
- Kazin, Michael; et al., eds. (2011). The Concise Princeton Encyclopedia of American Political History. Princeton University Press. ISBN 9781400839469.
- Kendi, Ibram X.; Blain, Keisha N., eds. (2021). Four Hundred Souls: A Community History of African America, 1619–2019. New York: One World. ISBN 978-0-593-13404-7.
- Kennedy, David M. (1999). Freedom from Fear: The American People in Depression and War, 1929–1945. Oxford History of the United States.
- Kirkendall, Richard S. (1980). A Global Power: America Since the Age of Roosevelt (2nd ed.).
- Kirkland, Edward C. (1960). A History Of American Economic Life (PDF) (3rd ed.).
- Kurian, George T., ed. (2001). Encyclopedia of American Studies.
- Lancaster, Bruce; Catton, Bruce; Fleming, Thomas (2004). The American Heritage History of the American Revolution.
- Leuchtenburg, William E. (2015). The American President: From Teddy Roosevelt to Bill Clinton. Oxford University Press. ISBN 9780199721108.
- Loomis, Erik (2020). A History of America in Ten Strikes. The New Press. ISBN 9781620976272.
- McHugh, Jess (2021). Americanon: An Unexpected U.S. History in Thirteen Bestselling Books. [New York]: Dutton. ISBN 978-1-5247-4663-6. OCLC 1228226135.
- McLoughlin, William Gerald (1984). Revivals, awakenings, and reform: an essay on religion and social change in America, 1607 - 1977. Chicago history of American religion (Nachdr. ed.). Chicago: The Univ. of Chicago Pr. ISBN 978-0-226-56092-2.
- McPherson, James M. (2003). Battle Cry of Freedom: The Civil War Era. Oxford History of the United States.
- Middleton, Richard; Lombard, Anne (2011). Colonial America: A History to 1763. Wiley. ISBN 9781405190046.
- Milkis, Sidney M.; Mileur, Jerome M., eds. (2002). The New Deal and the Triumph of Liberalism.
- Miller, John C. (1960). The Federalist Era: 1789–1801. Harper & Brothers.
- Miller, Perry (1996). Errand into the wilderness (11. print ed.). Cambridge, Mass.: Belknap Pr. of Harvard Univ. Pr. ISBN 978-0-674-26155-6.
- Milner, Clyde A.; O'Connor, Carol A.; Sandweiss, Martha A., eds. (1996). The Oxford History of the American West.
- Morris, Charles R. (2017). A Rabble of Dead Money: The Great Crash and the Global Depression: 1929–1939. New York: PublicAffairs. ISBN 9781610395359.
- Nugent, Walter (2009). Progressivism: A Very Short Introduction.
- Ogawa, Dennis M.; Fox, Evarts C. Jr. (1991). Japanese Americans, from Relocation to Redress.
- Patterson, James T. (1997). Grand Expectations: The United States, 1945–1974. Oxford History of the United States.
- Patterson, James T. (2007). Restless Giant: The United States from Watergate to Bush v. Gore. Oxford History of the United States.
- Paxson, Frederic Logan (1924). History of the American frontier, 1763–1893 (PDF). Archived from the original (PDF) on February 2, 2016.
- Perry, Elisabeth Israels; Smith, Karen Manners, eds. (2006). The Gilded Age & Progressive Era: A Student Companion. Oxford University Press, USA. ISBN 9780195156706.
- Pole, Jack P.; Pole, J.R. (2003). A Companion to the American Revolution.
- Rable, George C. (2007). But There Was No Peace: The Role of Violence in the Politics of Reconstruction.
- Resch, John, ed. (2004). Americans at War: Society, Culture, and the Homefront.
- Riley, Glenda (2001). Inventing the American Woman: An Inclusive History.
- Rogin, Michael Paul (1991). Fathers and children: Andrew Jackson and the subjugation of the American Indian. New Brunswick, U.S.A: Transaction Publishers. ISBN 978-0-88738-886-6.
- Roseboom, Eugene H. (1957). A history of presidential elections. Macmillan.
- Savelle, Max (2005) [1948]. Seeds of Liberty: The Genesis of the American Mind. Kessinger Publishing. pp. 185–90. ISBN 9781419107078.
- Schlesinger, Arthur Jr., ed. (2011). History of American Presidential Elections, 1789–2008.
- Schlesinger, Arthur M. (1922). New Viewpoints in American History. Macmillan.
- Sheehan-Dean, Aaron, ed. (2014). A Companion to the U.S. Civil War. Wiley Blackwell. ISBN 9781444351316. Archived from the original on August 23, 2017.
- Sjursen, Daniel (2021). A True History of the United States: Indigenous Genocide, Racialized Slavery, Hyper-Capitalism, Militarist Imperialism and Other Overlooked Aspects of American Exceptionalism. Steerforth Press. ISBN 978-1586422530.
- Sklar, Martin J. (1988). The corporate reconstruction of American capitalism, 1890-1916: the market, the law, and politics. Cambridge: Cambridge University Press. ISBN 978-0-511-52878-1.
- Slotten, Hugh Richard, ed. (2014). The Oxford Encyclopedia of the History of American Science, Medicine, and Technology.
- Stagg, J. C. A. (2012). The War of 1812: Conflict for a Continent.
- Stagg, J. C. A. (1983). Mr Madison's War: Politics, Diplomacy and Warfare in the Early American Republic, 1783–1830. Princeton University Press. ISBN 0691047022.
- Stanley, Peter W. (1974). A Nation in the Making: The Philippines and the United States, 1899–1921. pp. 269–272.
- Susman, Warren (2009). Culture as history: the transformation of American society in the twentieth century. Smithsonian books (Reprint ed.). Washington: Smithsonian Institution Press. ISBN 978-1-58834-051-1.
- Taylor, Alan (2012). Colonial America: A Very Short Introduction.
- Taylor, Alan (2002). American Colonies.
- Taylor, Alan (2016). American Revolutions: A Continental History, 1750–1804. W. W. Norton. ISBN 9780393253870.
- Thernstrom, Stephan, ed. (1980). Harvard Encyclopedia of American Ethnic Groups. ISBN 9780674375123.
- Thornton, Russell (1991). "The Demography of the Trail of Tears Period: A New Estimate of Cherokee Population Losses". In Anderson, William L. (ed.). Cherokee Removal: Before and After. Athens: University of Georgia Press. ISBN 9780820312545.
- Tooker E (1990). "The United States Constitution and the Iroquois League". In Clifton JA (ed.). The Invented Indian: Cultural Fictions and Government Policies. Transaction Publishers. pp. 107–128. ISBN 9781560007456.
- van Dijk, Ruud; et al. (2013). Encyclopedia of the Cold War. Routledge. pp. 863–64. ISBN 9781135923112.
- Vann Woodward, C. (1974). The Strange Career of Jim Crow (3rd ed.).
- Sitkoff, Howard (2008). "Chapter 7". The Struggle for Black Equality (3rd ed.).
- Vickers, Daniel, ed. (2006). A Companion to Colonial America.
- Wilentz, Sean (2008). The Age of Reagan: A History, 1974–2008. Harper. ISBN 9780060744809.
- Williams, William Appleman (1961). The Contours of American History.
- Wood, Gordon S. (1998). The creation of the American Republic, 1776-1787. Institute of Early American History and Culture (Williamsburg, Va.). Chapel Hill: Published for the Institute of Early American History and Culture at Williamsburg, Va., by the University of North Carolina Press. ISBN 978-0-8078-2422-1.
- Wood, Gordon S. (2009). Empire of Liberty: A History of the Early Republic, 1789–1815. Oxford History of the United States. Oxford University Press. ISBN 9780195039146.
- Zophy, Angela Howard, ed. (2000). Handbook of American Women's History (2nd ed.). ISBN 9780824087449.

=== Surveys ===
- "Outline of American History – Chapter 1: Early America". usa.usembassy.de. Archived from the original on November 20, 2016.
- "Lesson Plan on "What Made George Washington a Good Military Leader?"". Archived from the original on June 11, 2011.
- Alexander, Ruth M.; Norton, Mary Beth (2006). Major Problems in American Women's History (4th ed.).
- Beard, Charles A.; Beard, Mary Ritter; Jones, Wilfred (1927). The Rise of American civilization. Macmillan.
- Carnes, Mark C.; Garraty, John A. (2015). The American Nation: A History of the United States (14th ed.). Prentice Hall PTR. ISBN 9780205841424.
- Divine, Robert A.; et al. (2012). America Past and Present (10th ed.). Prentice Hall PTR. ISBN 9780205910083.
- Foner, Eric (2017). Give Me Liberty! An American History (5th ed.). W.W. Norton & Company. ISBN 9780393614121.
- Gilbert, Martin (2009). The Routledge Atlas of American History (6th ed.). Routledge. ISBN 9780415488389.
- Hamby, Alonzo L. (2007). Outline of U.S. History. Nova Science Publishers. ISBN 9781600214578.
- Henretta, James A. (2007). "History of Colonial America". Encarta Online Encyclopedia. Archived from the original on September 23, 2009.
- Kennedy, David M.; Cohen, Lizabeth; Bailey, Thomas A. (2002). The American Pageant: A History of the Republic (12th ed.). Houghton Mifflin. ISBN 9780618103492.
- Norton, Mary Beth; et al. (2011). A People and a Nation, Volume I: to 1877 (9th ed.). Houghton Mifflin. ISBN 9780495916550.
- Schweikart, Larry; Dougherty, Dave (2013). A Patriot's History of the Modern World, Vol. I: From America's Exceptional Ascent to the Atomic Bomb: 1898–1945; Vol. II: From the Cold War to the Age of Entitlement, 1945–2012.
- Tindall, George B.; Shi, David E. (2012). America: A Narrative History (9th ed.).
- Zinn, Howard (2003). A People's History of the United States. HarperPerennial Modern Classics. ISBN 9780060528423.

=== Primary sources ===
- Commager, Henry Steele (1988). Cantor, Milton (ed.). Documents of American History Since 1898 (8th ed.).
- Engel, Jeffrey A.; et al. (2014). America in the World: A History in Documents from the War with Spain to the War on Terror.
- Commager, Henry Steele; Morris, Richard B., eds. (1958). The Spirit of 'Seventy-Six': The Story of the American Revolution as told by Participants.
- Troy, Gil; Schlesinger, Arthur Jr., eds. (2011). History of American Presidential Elections, 1789–2008.

== See also ==
- Bibliography of the American Civil War
- Bibliography of the United States Constitution
- List of bibliographies on American history
