= Empire of Liberty: A History of the Early Republic, 1789–1815 =

2009 American history book by Gordon S. Wood

- First edition cover
- Author: Gordon S. Wood
- Series: Oxford History of the United States
- Subject: History of the United States
- Publisher: Oxford University Press
- Publication date: October 28, 2009
- Media type: Print (hardcover)
- Pages: 778
- ISBN: 9780195039146
- Preceded by: The Glorious Cause: The American Revolution, 1763–1789
- Followed by: What Hath God Wrought: The Transformation of America, 1815–1848

Empire of Liberty: A History of the Early Republic, 1789–1815 is a nonfiction book written by the American historian Gordon S. Wood. Published as a clothbound hardcover in 2009 as part of the Oxford History of the United States series, the book narrates the history of the United States in the first twenty-six years following the ratification of the U. S. Constitution. The history Empire of Liberty tells privileges republicanism and political thought, characterizing the early United States as a time of growing egalitarianism unleashed by the American Revolution. The story involves both Federalists (Note: The Federalists were a political faction that coalesced around Alexander Hamilton. Generally they advocated a centrally organized, strong executive state. They opposed the Jeffersonians.) and Jeffersonians. (Note: Jeffersonians were a political faction that coalesced around the leadership of Thomas Jefferson and around opposing the policies of Alexander Hamilton, the first Secretary of the Treasury. Jeffersonians supported reducing the size of the federal government and limiting executive intervention in the economy. They were also called "Jeffersonian Republicans" (the contemporary American political party known as the Republicans did not exist at the time and was founded in the 1850s; the modern Democratic Party traces its history to the Jeffersonians).) Empire of Liberty tends to sympathize with Jeffersonians.

Reviews praised the book's style and prose, though its historical views have been criticized as regressive or idealistic. Publishers Weekly gave Empire of Liberty a starred review. Historian Drew McCoy called Wood's treatment of the republican family a "superb discussion". David Waldstreicher commended Wood's grasp of aspects of the history of ideas and analysis of the Founding Fathers' thought. Empire of Liberty's wider narrative has been criticized for resembling those of consensus history in the 1950s—homogenizing Americans and overstating how widely they accepted democracy and equality as ideals—and for not doing much to integrate historiographic developments like social history, the cultural turn, and the linguistic turn. Historians Nancy Isenberg and John L. Brooke criticized the book's cursory treatment of women's history during the era.

Empire of Liberty was a finalist for the 2010 Pulitzer Prize for History. It was one of the New York Times Book Review's top 100 books of 2009, and it received the New-York Historical Society's American History Book Prize and the Audio Publishers Association's Audie Award for History.

== Background ==
=== The Oxford History of the United States ===
In the 1950s, historians Richard Hofstadter and C. Vann Woodward conceived a multivolume series on the history of the United States: the Oxford History of the United States. Hofstadter died before production truly got underway, leaving Woodward as editor with Sheldon Meyer's assistance until 1999, when the editorship passed to David M. Kennedy and Peter Ginna. During the twentieth century, Woodward was uneasy with the then-contemporary historical profession's increasing emphasis on social history beyond traditional political historical narrative and with how American universities changed in response to decolonization, Black Power, and women's rights movements. Woodward believed historians were becoming "indifferen[t] to the layman" and were overemphasizing the "analytical" at the expense of "narrative", and with what historian Micki McElya calls "reactionary fervor" resolved to, through the Oxford History of the United States, reestablish what he considered a cohesive narrative of American history.

When Woodward and Hofstadter reached out in 1962 to Stanley Elkins and Eric McKitrick, former students of Hofstadter, the editors initially asked them to write one of the later volumes in the series; in reply, Elkins and McKitrick asked to instead write the series' planned volume about United States history from 1789 to 1815, a request Hofstadter happily granted, and Oxford University Press issued Elkins and McKitrick an advance payment almost twice as much as that of other editors. Hofstadter initially worried Elkins and McKitrick's book would be relatively short, but in 1975 they had no complete manuscript and wanted to either leave the project or be allowed to write multiple volumes about their assigned time span instead of the planned single volume. Meyer urged them to remain on the project, though he insisted that a multivolume treatment of the period was off the table, but when Woodward asked the duo for an update in 1979, Elkins and McKitrick informed him they were writing the project as a two-volume work and would produce a condensed, single-volume version for the series thereafter, and upon this news the Oxford History of the United States dropped the pair from the project. Elkins and McKitrick's manuscript, which ultimately did not narrate past 1800, was published by Oxford University Press outside the series in 1993 as the single-volume The Age of Federalism.

=== Gordon S. Wood ===
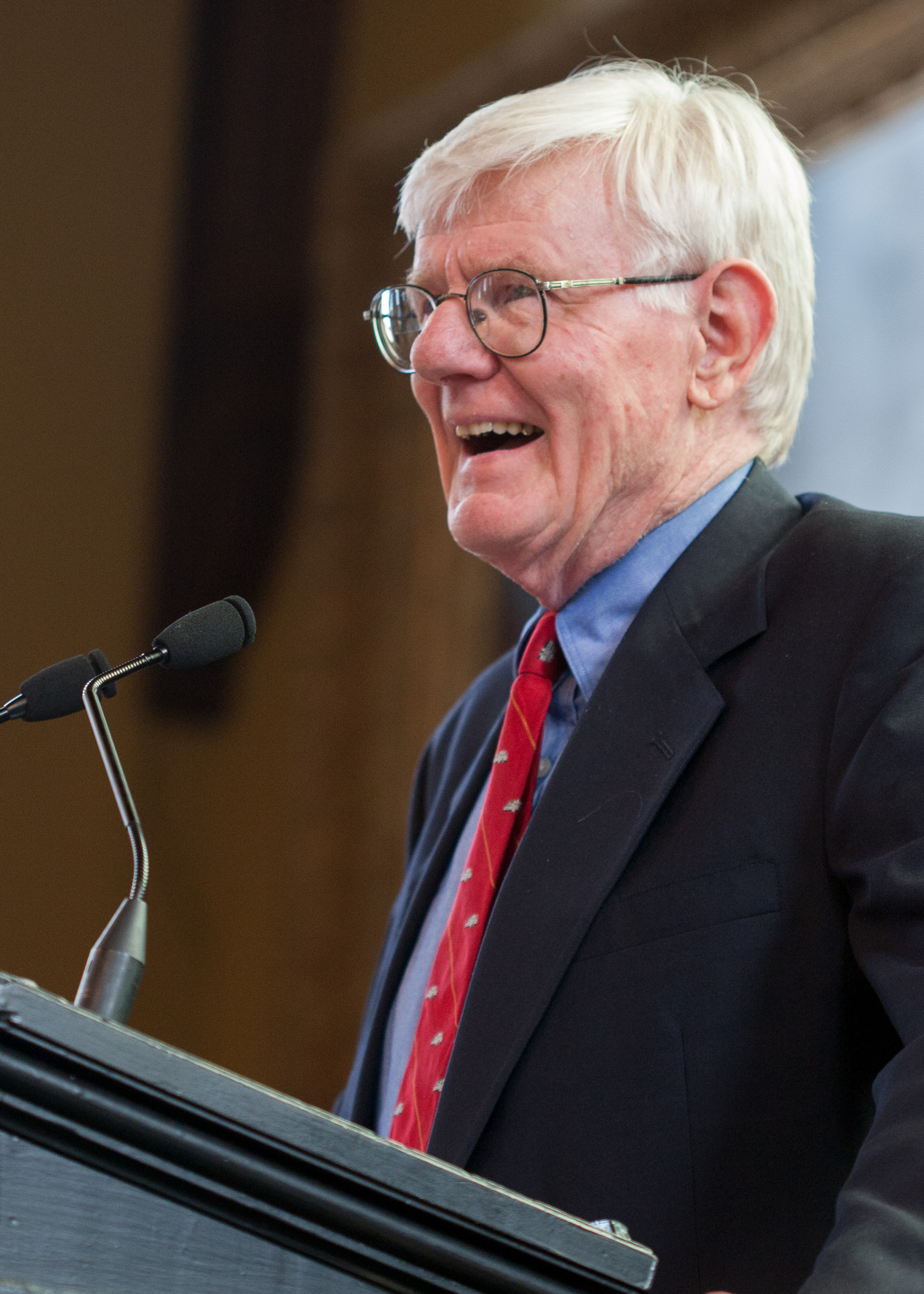
Gordon S. Wood in 2006.

In 1982, Woodward invited historian Gordon S. Wood to write for the Oxford History of the United States series to replace Elkins and McKitrick. Even before writing Empire of Liberty, Wood was "perhaps the leading historian of the American revolutionary era, of his generation", in the words of reviewer Peter Field. His first monograph was the 1969 The Creation of the American Republic, 1776–1787, a book which won the Bancroft Prize. He also wrote the 1993 The Radicalism of the American Revolution, a Pulitzer Prize-winning book which argued that the American Revolution transformed society, shifting American sensibilities from deferential hierarchy to egalitarian liberal democracy. In a 2010 review of Empire of Liberty, reviewer Walter Mead concluded that "[n]o one is more qualified to write a history of this vital period in the rise of the United States than Wood".

Reviewer Ed Voves related Empire of Liberty to Wood's preceding corpus, calling it "a complement to Wood's earlier books, as well as a volume in the Oxford series". Communication scholar Alfred Soto dubbed the book "a splendid sequel" to Wood's Radicalism of the American Revolution, Historian Nancy Isenberg called Empire of Liberty a "reprise" of Radicalism of the American Revolution. In reviewer Trevor Burnard's words, Empire of Liberty "rehearses and extends the arguments made in Wood's previous books that this period was revolutionary in its overturning of old ideas of hierarchy and in its assertion of egalitarian doctrines for ordinary white men".

== Content ==
Empire of Liberty narrates twenty-six years of American history, covering both the Federalist Era and the Jeffersonian era, (Note: The Federalist era being approximately the first decade of the post-Constitution United States (1788–1800), when Federalists led national politics; and the Jeffersonian era being the early decades of the nineteenth century when Jeffersonians dominated national politics, inaugurated by the ascent of Thomas Jefferson to the presidency in 1801.) bookended by the ratification of the Constitution of the United States and the end of the War of 1812. Structurally, the book is largely chronological in its first eight chapters, up to the 1800 United States presidential election, and mostly topical in its last eleven chapters. According to Field, although Woodward conceived the Oxford History of the United States series as narrative history, Wood's Empire of Liberty "does not really offer narrative history" because of portions in which he treats events non-chronologically. (Note: Wood had, while signed on to write Empire of Liberty, in a 1982 review of Oxford History of the United States book The Glorious Cause: The American Revolution, 1763–1789 criticized The Glorious Cause and questioned whether traditional narrative history was a valid methodology at all.)

The book narrates this history as a time of transition: after the American Revolution unleashed egalitarian energies and moved society away from monarchism and toward republican society, the early national period featured a shift into what historian Sean Wilentz calls "rambunctious democracy" during the presidency of Thomas Jefferson and that of James Madison. The rise of individualism and democracy are central themes throughout Empire of Liberty. Republicanism is at the center of the book. (Note: In its classical sense applied to early American history, republicanism generally means an ideology upholding public good as the primary goal of political society and advocating for citizens to be virtuous and public-minded, politically independent of others, and active participants in civic society. (The contemporary American political party known as the Republicans did not exist at this time; it was founded in the 1850s.)) The historical narrative is the story of an American people overcoming and setting aside the past. According to Wood, democratization pervaded much of American life in the course of the nation becoming a liberal society. The middle class grew and sought commercial success, and disestablished religion led to preachers multiplying and Christianizing the United States; decentralization and homogenization went hand in hand as individualism and popular culture proliferated.

Politically, the narrative tends to side with historical Jeffersonians. According to David Waldstreicher, Wood "has sympathy for both sides of the partisan battles". Federalists appear in the history as political conservatives who were trying to restore the social deference and hierarchies that had characterized monarchic society and were out of step with the era's democratic milieu. Overall, the book offers a celebratory portrayal of early Americans overthrowing legacies of traditionalist hierarchy, and it casts Thomas Jefferson as the embodiment of this perspective.

Reviewer Kevin Hartnett notes that according to Empire of Liberty, Jefferson's "libertarian vision became America's dominant political philosophy—with ironic results". Reviewer Drew McCoy summarizes, "the real winners in this American success story are not the Founding Fathers, including Jefferson, but Jefferson's followers in the northern states", those who made society increasingly democratic, commercial, and Christian and thrived in that context.

Empire of Liberty often generalizes about the experiences and values of Americans "everywhere". According to Field, the book is a "regional interpretation, and a selective one at that". The book frequently qualifies its generalizations as applying mostly to the northern United States; according to historian John L. Brooke, the result is that "Wood is really only interested in" a minority of Americans, those "part of northern society, that part shaped by the political culture of Jeffersonian Republicanism", whose congressional legislators represented districts containing less than 30% of the American population in the nineteenth century's first decade. In Wood's accounting, traditionalism continued in the American South, but progressive democracy permeated the culture of the North.

== Publication ==
External videos
- Presentation by Wood on Empire of Liberty, October 7, 2009, Book TV (C-SPAN)

Oxford University Press published Empire of Liberty in 2009, twenty-seven years after the publication of its preceding title in the series, Robert Middlekauff's The Glorious Cause: The American Revolution, 1763–1789. The book was printed as a clothbound hardcover. On release, it sold for $35 (equivalent to $53 in 2025). The book is approximately 800 pages long. It includes maps, an index, and a bibliographical essay. There are forty black-and-white illustrations. With the release of Empire of Liberty, in 2009 the Oxford History of the United States covered the chronological span of American history from 1763 to 1865.

Oxford University Press published a paperback edition of Empire of Liberty in 2011, selling it for $19.95 (equivalent to $30 in 2025). Digital audiobook service Audible released an audiobook edition of Empire of Liberty, narrated by Robert Fass.

== Critical reception ==
=== Style ===
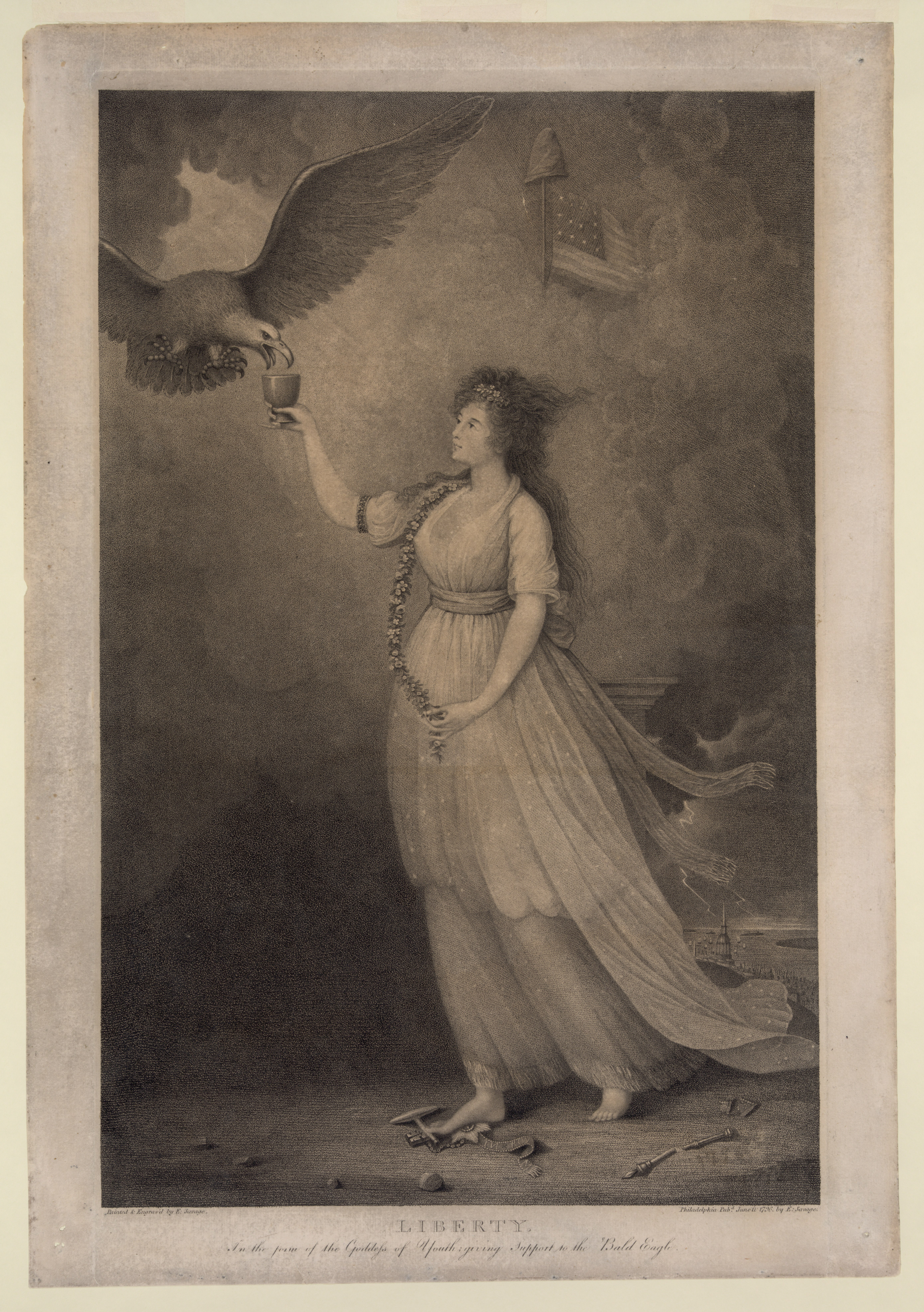
Liberty. In the form of the goddess of youth, giving support to the bald eagle, a 1796 engraving by Edward Savage.

Foreign Affairs called the book "a tour de force of scholarship and a gripping read". Reviewer Trevor Burnard praised Empire of Liberty's "verve and elegance" and considered the book emblematic of "the strengths of the [Oxford History of the United States] series". Wilentz praised the book for being "even-handed". According to Isenberg, Wood's writing voice resembles that of "the overwrought writers of the early republic whom he quotes".

=== History ===
Historian James Sharp called Empire of Liberty a "monumental achievement of research and synthesis by one of our finest historians". Reviewer David Waldstreicher considered Wood "at his most insightful" when discussing the American founders and broad strokes in the history of ideas. Field wrote that "Empire of Liberty does not really break new ground; nor does that seem to have been its author's intention", and the book extends the arguments of Wood's earlier books, like The Radicalism of the American Revolution. According to Isenberg, Empire of Liberty recapitulates the consensus history interpretation popular in the 1950s, telling an outdated narrative which homogenizes the American people and overcredits the revolution with establishing democracy and equality as widely accepted and uncontroversial values, a conception of U. S. history that few contemporary academic historians accept. Waldstreicher's review observed that the histories of chattel slavery and territorial expansion do not fit well into Wood's overall scheme, and his depiction of the historiography is "partial and misleading on work with which Wood disagrees". Burnard considered the book (along with the rest of the Oxford History of the United States) lacking in its attention to developments in historiography like social history, the cultural turn, and the linguistic turn.

Empire of Liberty specifically addresses women's history less than twenty-five times. McCoy called Wood's treatment of the republican family (Note: By "republican family", Wood refers to post-revolutionary family culture which emphasized greater parity in the household among children and both parents, as opposed to the husband-centered patriarchally authoritarian family structure common in colonial America. Megan Owens states that "marriage in practice did not always match up to the ideal 'republican family' model", and whether the republican family was genuinely antipatriarchal is debated; historian Nancy Cott argues that "[a]lthough Revolutionary-era republican political thinking was antipatriarchal in the sense that it followed John Locke's political theory rather than Sir Robert Filmer's, the republican polity at that time affirmed the rights of the independent citizen" as "an indisputably male actor" who acted and voted on behalf of a dependent family.) a "superb discussion" of "the relationship between Revolutionary culture and women's experiences". According to Brooke, "Wood virtually leaves women out of the picture, with the sole exception of a short twelve-page section… on women, family, and citizenship" and remarks that "[l]eaving half of the population out of the picture in a synthesis published in the early-twenty-first century is really quite amazing". In Isenberg's words, the subject of women is "so disruptive" to Wood's narrative that "he exiles" the topic to a chapter that appears after the book's halfway mark.

While acknowledging "the book's triumphal success" in general, historian Mark Noll criticized Empire of Liberty's presentation of the history of religion in the United States as reductive: in Noll's words, Wood "described religion in this period as being defined, driven, or caused by the expanding logic of Revolutionary liberty", resultantly understating the capacity of religion itself as a system of thought and motivating factor.

=== Series cohesion ===
In his review of the overall Oxford History of the United States series, Burnard observed that there are "occasional disagreements of historical interpretation" between the books, including Empire of Liberty. The same people who are Whig revolutionaries in the preceding book in the series, Middelkauff's The Glorious Cause, become Federalist conservatives in Empire of Liberty. Middlekauff characterizes the American founders as motivated by Christian providentialism, whereas Wood assesses them as not being particularly religious. According to Empire of Liberty, compared to the northern United States the American South became an increasingly anomalous part of the country over time, with its retention of slavery and traditionalism; meanwhile, James M. McPherson's volume in the series, Battle Cry of Freedom: The Civil War Era (published in 1988, before Empire of Liberty), argues that globally, the South's traditionalism was more typical while the northern states were the exceptional society.

=== Tone ===
Some reviewers considered the book's tone ironic. Reviewer Drew McCoy stated that "Empire of Liberty ends on a surprising, somewhat awkward note" that "is, in the short run at least, less triumphant in tone than ironic" because Wood elaborates on the integral role of slavery in the United States' territorial and economic growth and concludes the monograph by describing the future American Civil War as "the climax of a tragedy that was preordained from the time of the Revolution". Reviewer Hartnett described the outcome of Jefferson's political and philosophical triumph in the book as having "ironic results".

Other book reviews characterized the book's tone as triumphalist. Brooke remarked that Empire of Liberty's "central theme of a rising people throwing off the past" would likely "be vociferously debated" and posed that "Wood's celebratory image of the early Republic… does not fully square with his own evidence". Isenberg called Empire of Liberty a "morality play" that is "preachier in trumpeting the American dream" than Wood's earlier corpus. According to Noll, although Empire of Liberty presents "the material for a complex moral judgment on American history", its overall tone is laudatory and does not "not feature that ambiguity as a controlling theme". As an example of this, Noll considered Wood's characterization of Jefferson as the United States' "supreme spokesman" for liberty at odds with the book's own report of Jefferson's ambitions for continental conquest, indulgent and debt-ridden lifestyle, and hypocritical participation in slavery.

== Honors ==
Publishers Weekly gave Empire of Liberty a starred review. The New York Times Book Review selected it as one of its 100 top books of 2009.

Empire of Liberty was a finalist for the 2010 Pulitzer Prize in History and received the American History Book Prize from the New-York Historical Society. The audiobook edition received the Audio Publishers Association's 2011 Audie Award for History.

== See also ==
- The History of the United States of America 1801–1817
