= Oxford History of the United States =

Ongoing multi-volume narrative history of the United States

- First edition cover of The Glorious Cause, the first book published in the series
- The Glorious Cause (1982; 2005); Battle Cry of Freedom (1988); Grand Expectations (1996); Freedom from Fear (1999); Restless Giant (2005); What Hath God Wrought (2007); From Colony to Superpower (2008; 2017); Empire of Liberty (2009); The Republic for Which It Stands (2017); Contested Continent (2026)
- Edited by: Richard Hofstadter (1961–1970); C. Vann Woodward (1961–1999); David M. Kennedy (1999– )
- Genre: Narrative history
- Publisher: Oxford University Press
- Media type: Books

The Oxford History of the United States is an ongoing multivolume narrative history of the United States published by Oxford University Press. Conceived in the 1950s and launched in 1961 under the co-editorship of historians Richard Hofstadter and C. Vann Woodward, the series has been edited by David M. Kennedy since 1999.

Since its inception, the series editors have invited numerous historians to write for the Oxford History of the United States. Contracting authors and procuring manuscripts from them has been a perennial challenge for the series' publication. No author originally commissioned to write for the series has ultimately gone on to publish a volume with the Oxford History of the United States. Multiple authors have withdrawn from the series for a variety of reasons including health and age, and more than once editors have decided to ultimately reject an author's manuscript submission on the grounds of it not fitting the series.

The first book published in the series released in 1982. Since then, the series has published ten out of twelve planned volumes. Oxford University Press's original idea was to publish six volumes covering chronological eras and six volumes treating specific historical themes. The planned volumes changed, with more chronological volumes added to the series and planned volumes on economic and intellectual history cancelled.

Multiple books published in the series have received or been nominated for awards. Three received a Pulitzer Prize. Reviews have been mostly positive. Some volumes faced criticism for being "intellectually flabby".

== Publication history ==
Oxford University Press publishes multivolume "Oxford histories" that usually are intended to synthesize existing scholarship on a topic into general surveys rather than advance novel interpretations. The press has previously published, in 1927, a two-volume history of the United States by Samuel Eliot Morison, titled The Oxford History of the United States, 1783–1917.

=== Hofstadter and Woodward co-editorship ===
The Oxford History of the United States book series originated in the 1950s with a plan laid out by historians C. Vann Woodward and Richard Hofstadter for a multivolume history of the United States published by Oxford University Press, modeled on the Oxford History of England, that would provide a summary of the political, social, and cultural history of the United States for a general audience. The press's initial vision was to publish six volumes about discrete periods of American history and six volumes about historical themes (such as economic history) across the entirety of the United States' history. This plan did not remain in place.

In 1961, Hofstadter and Woodward began their co-editorship, inviting scholars to write for the series and initially optimistic that they would receive many manuscripts, though the project proved to be more challenging than initially envisioned as they struggled to secure authors for volumes. The series invites authors to write volumes. New fields of historical study emerged in the 1960s, and personal issues intervened for some of the authors. Hofstadter and Woodward tried but failed to contract the Atlantic historian Bernard Bailyn for the series' volume on the American Revolution. In 1962, the series contracted Stanley Elkins and Eric McKitrick—both former students of Hofstadter—to write a volume covering 1789 to 1815. Kenneth M. Stampp signed to write the volume about the American Civil War, but he withdrew from the series; Woodward and Hofstadter replaced Stampp with William W. Freehling, who had initially signed to write the volume about the early nineteenth century, or Jacksonian era, replacing Freehling in turn with Charles Grier Sellers. Among historians connected with the series at one time or another were Morton Keller, John Lewis Gaddis, Stanley Elkins and Eric McKitrick. Though some of these historians completed books as a result of their respective assignments, none of them was published as part of the series.

=== Woodward editorship ===
Hofstadter died of leukemia in 1970, leaving Woodward as the series editor. That same year, Oxford University Press published its first formal announcement of the series and projected the following authors and volumes:

- Colonial America by Alden Vaughan
- The Revolutionary Era by Merrill Jensen
- Early National America, 1789–1815 by Stanley Elkins and Eric McKitrick
- Jacksonian America, 1815–1846 by Charles Grier Sellers
- The Civil War by William W. Freehling
- Reconstruction and Industrial America by Morton Keller (Note: Before the series contracted Keller for this volume, Woodward had originally been tasked with writing it.)
- Early Twentieth-Century America, 1900–1930 by William H. Harbaugh
- The New Deal, 1930–1945 by Ernest R. May
- The American Economy by Stuart Bruchey
- American Diplomacy by Norman A. Graebner
- The Intellectual History of the United States by John W. Ward

Ward left the project in 1971, and the series temporarily considered signing historian R. Jackson Wilson to replace Ward as author of an intellectual history volume before eventually dropping the volume sometime after the early 1980s. Keller submitted his manuscript about the Reconstruction era in 1971, making him the first of the signed authors to do so; after multiple rounds of revisions, Woodward and Oxford University Press editor Sheldon Meyer rejected the manuscript on the grounds that it was insufficiently attendant to lay readers and too focused on politics. Harvard University Press published Keller's manuscript in 1977 as Affairs of State: Public Life in Late Nineteenth-century America, and the Oxford History contracted George M. Fredrickson to replace Keller.

Freehling, signed to write about the Civil War, later withdrew from the series, replaced by Willie Lee Rose, a former graduate student of Woodward's. She was the only woman either Hofstadter or Woodward ever invited to write for the series. After Rose had a stroke in 1978, she was unable to continue the project, and James M. McPherson replaced her as the series' Civil War author.

When asked for a progress report in 1979, Elkins and McKitrick did not have a complete manuscript, and they pitched covering their assigned period in more than one volume; in 1982, Woodward and Meyer replaced them with historian Gordon S. Wood as author of the volume covering 1789 to 1815. Oxford University Press later published Elkins and McKitrick's manuscript, narrating United States history up to 1800, as the 1993 The Age of Federalism.

The first volume published in the series, The Glorious Cause: The American Revolution, 1763–1789, written by Robert Middlekauff (who replaced Jensen in December 1970), was published in 1982. Included on the rear dust jacket flap to the original hardcover edition was a projected outline for the series at that point:

- Volume 1: Colonial America by T. H. Breen
- Volume 2: The Glorious Cause by Robert Middlekauff
- Volume 3: Early National America, 1789–1815 by Gordon S. Wood
- Volume 4: Jacksonian America, 1815–1846 by Charles Grier Sellers
- Volume 5: The Civil War by James M. McPherson
- Volume 6: Reconstruction and Industrial America by George M. Fredrickson
- Volume 7: Early 20th Century America, 1900–1930 by William H. Harbaugh
- Volume 8: The New Deal, 1930–1945 by David M. Kennedy
- Volume 9: Postwar America, 1945–1968 by William Leuchtenburg (Note: A volume on postwar American history was not originally planned for the series but was added when it became, in historian James Cobb's words, "necessary to extend its chronology forward".)
- Volume 10: The American Economy by Stuart Bruchey
- Volume 11: American Diplomacy by Norman A. Graebner

Concerned that his manuscript was amounting to a textbook, Breen left the series in 1985; Fredrickson left with similar concerns in 1987. In 1988, the series published McPherson's volume on the Civil War period as Battle Cry of Freedom: The Civil War Era. The year before, Sellers submitted to Woodward a partial draft of his Jacksonian America contribution; the draft's style and theoretical bent dissatisfied Woodward, who believed it would not appeal to a lay audience, and in 1990 he rejected the manuscript. Oxford University Press published Sellers's manuscript outside the series as The Market Revolution: Jacksonian America, 1815–1846, and the press contracted Daniel Walker Howe to replace Sellers's contribution. Historian James T. Patterson replaced Leuchtenberg as author of the postwar history volume. Bruchey submitted his manuscript about economic history, but Woodward decided not to publish it in the series.

Two more volumes followed under Woodward's editorship. Grand Expectations: The United States, 1945–1974, by Patterson, was published in 1996, and Kennedy's Freedom From Fear: The American People in Depression and War, 1929–1945 was published in 1999.

=== Kennedy editorship ===
External videos
- Panel discussion with David M. Kennedy, James McPherson, Robert Middlekauff, and James T. Patterson, September 20, 2005, C-SPAN

After Woodward's death in 1999, David Kennedy assumed the editorship of the series. Restless Giant: The United States from Watergate to Bush v. Gore, also written by Patterson, was published in 2005. Oxford University Press' catalog for the spring of 2007 announced that a volume written by H. W. Brands, Leviathan: America Comes of Age, 1865–1900, would be published as part of the series. However, in December 2006 the Boston Globe reported that Leviathan was dropped from the series. That same month, the Globe reported Howe and Herring had submitted book drafts (the latter for a thematic volume on diplomacy), Wood had submitted chapter drafts, historian Bruce Schulman had signed to write a volume on history from 1896 to 1929, and Fred Anderson and Andrew Cayton were writing the series' volume planned to cover 1672 to 1763.

Howe's What Hath God Wrought: The Transformation of America, 1815–1848 joined the series' published volumes in 2007. In 2008, the series published George C. Herring's From Colony to Superpower: U. S. Foreign Relations Since 1776 as its thematic volume on diplomatic history. Wood's Empire of Liberty: A History of the Early Republic, 1789–1815 followed in 2009. In 2017, the series published The Republic for Which It Stands: The United States During Reconstruction and the Gilded Age, 1865–1896, written by Richard White, as its volume covering Reconstruction and the Gilded Age.

During Kennedy's tenure, the series republished some of its volumes in new editions. Freedom from Fear came out in paperback in 2001. The Illustrated Battle Cry of Freedom: The Civil War Era was released in 2003 as another edition of McPherson's book, replacing the footnotes and a fifth of the original text with more maps, photographs, and period art, accompanied with captions by McPherson. In 2005, the series published a revised edition of Middlekauff's The Glorious Cause that added more social history and a new epilogue and bibliographic essay.

In 2011, it was reported that Schulman remained at work on his volume for the series covering 1896 to 1929. In 2016, Schulman won the National Endowment for the Humanities' Public Scholar Award for this project. As of 2011, Anderson and Cayton's Imperial America, 1672–1764 (then planned to be the series' second volume) remained a work in progress. The book was unfinished when Cayton died in 2015. Historian Peter C. Mancall was signed to write what is planned to be the chronologically first volume of the series with the working title American Origins (which was officially announced in August 2025 to be forthcoming as Contested Continent: The Struggle for North America, c.1000–1680).

== Volumes ==
Vol.	Author	Title	Release date	Pages	ISBN	Awards
1	Peter C. Mancall	Contested Continent: The Struggle for North America, c. 1000–1680	2026	792	978-0195372786	
2	Fred Anderson	Imperial America	TBA	TBA	TBA	
3	Robert Middlekauff	The Glorious Cause: The American Revolution, 1763–1789	1982; 2005 (2d ed.)	760	978-0195162479	Finalist 1983 Pulitzer Prize for History
4	Gordon S. Wood	Empire of Liberty: A History of the Early Republic, 1789–1815	2009	800	978-0195039146	Finalist 2010 Pulitzer Prize for History
5	Daniel Walker Howe	What Hath God Wrought: The Transformation of America, 1815–1848	2007	928	978-0195078947	Won 2008 Pulitzer Prize for History
6	James M. McPherson	Battle Cry of Freedom: The Civil War Era	1988	904	978-0195038637	Won 1989 Pulitzer Prize for History
7	Richard White	The Republic for Which It Stands: The United States During Reconstruction and the Gilded Age, 1865–1896	2017	928	978-0199735815	
8	Bruce Schulman	Reawakened Nation: The Birth of Modern America, 1896–1929	TBA	TBA	TBA	
9	David M. Kennedy	Freedom from Fear: The American People in Depression and War, 1929–1945	1999	990	978-0195038347	Won 2000 Pulitzer Prize for History
10	James T. Patterson	Grand Expectations: The United States, 1945–1974	1996	880	978-0195076806	Won 1997 Bancroft Prize
11	James T. Patterson	Restless Giant: The United States from Watergate to Bush v. Gore	2005	448	978-0195122169	
12	George C. Herring	From Colony to Superpower: U.S. Foreign Relations Since 1776	2008	1056	978-0195078220	Nom. for 2008 National Book Critics Circle Award
12	George C. Herring	Years of Peril and Ambition: U.S. Foreign Relations, 1776–1921	2017 (2d ed.)	472	978-0190212469	
12	George C. Herring	The American Century and Beyond: U.S. Foreign Relations, 1893–2014	2017 (2d ed.)	768	978-0190212476	

None of the volumes published in the series have been written by the authors originally commissioned at the series' first conception.

== Reception ==
For the most part, the publication of each volume has been greeted with laudatory reviews. Three of the volumes (McPherson's Battle Cry of Freedom, Kennedy's Freedom from Fear, and Howe's What Hath God Wrought) were awarded the Pulitzer Prize for History upon their publication. Middlekauff's Glorious Cause and Wood's Empire of Liberty were finalists for the prize in 1982 and 2010, respectively. Patterson's Grand Expectations also received the 1997 Bancroft Prize in American history, and Kennedy's Freedom from Fear also received the 2000 Francis Parkman Prize.

When originally published in hardcover, McPherson's Battle Cry of Freedom spent 16 weeks on The New York Times Best Seller list, and an additional 3 months for the subsequent paperback edition.

However, in the October 2006 issue of the Atlantic Monthly, the magazine's book editor, Benjamin Schwarz, criticized the volumes by Kennedy and Patterson in the Oxford History of the United States as "bloated and intellectually flabby" compared to the entries in the New Oxford History of England, maintaining that the volumes "lack the intellectual refinement, analytic sharpness, and stylistic verve" of their English counterparts. Christopher Shea considered Schwarz's criticism "idiosyncratic".

== Sources ==
- Aron, Stephen (Summer 2018). "The Republic for Which It Stands: The United States during Reconstruction and the Gilded Age, 1865–1896. The Oxford History of the United States. By Richard White". Western Historical Quarterly. 49 (2): 209–210. doi:10.1093/whq/why015.
- Cobb, James C. (2022). C. Vann Woodward: America's Historian. University of North Carolina Press. ISBN 978-1-4696-7021-8.
- Doenecke, Justus D. (November–December 2004). "Hoover to Hiroshima: So You Think American History from the Great Depression Through World War II Holds No Surprises? Read on". Books & Culture. Vol. 10, no. 6. pp. 24–26.
- Flatley, Robert (15 February 2005). "Middlekauff, Robert. The Glorious Cause: The American Revolution, 1763–1789". Library Journal. 130 (3): 145. ISSN 0363-0277.
- O'Brien, Michael (August 2011). "A Response to Trevor Burnard: The Standpoint of an Editor". Journal of American Studies. 45 (3): 426–430. doi:10.1017/S0021875811000508. hdl:11343/33008. JSTOR 23016780.
- McElya, Micki (August 2011). "A Response to Trevor Burnard: 'America the Good, America the Brave, America the Free'". Journal of American Studies. 45 (3): 421–425. doi:10.1017/S0021875811000508. hdl:11343/33008. JSTOR 23016779.
- Middlekauff, Robert (1982). The Glorious Cause: The American Revolution, 1763–1789. Oxford History of the United States (1st ed.). Oxford University Press. ISBN 0-19-502921-6.
- Phelps, Christopher (August 2011). "A Response to Trevor Burnard: American Past, America Present". Journal of American Studies. 45 (3): 431–436. doi:10.1017/S0021875811000508. hdl:11343/33008. JSTOR 23016781.
- Van Heyningen, E. B. (1986). "The Glorious Cause: The American Revolution, 1763–1789. By R. Middlekauff". Boekbesprekings/Book Reviews. South African Historical Journal. 18: 298–300. doi:10.1080/02582478608671616.
