= Harold Vyvyan Harmsworth Professor of American History =

Professorship at the University of Oxford

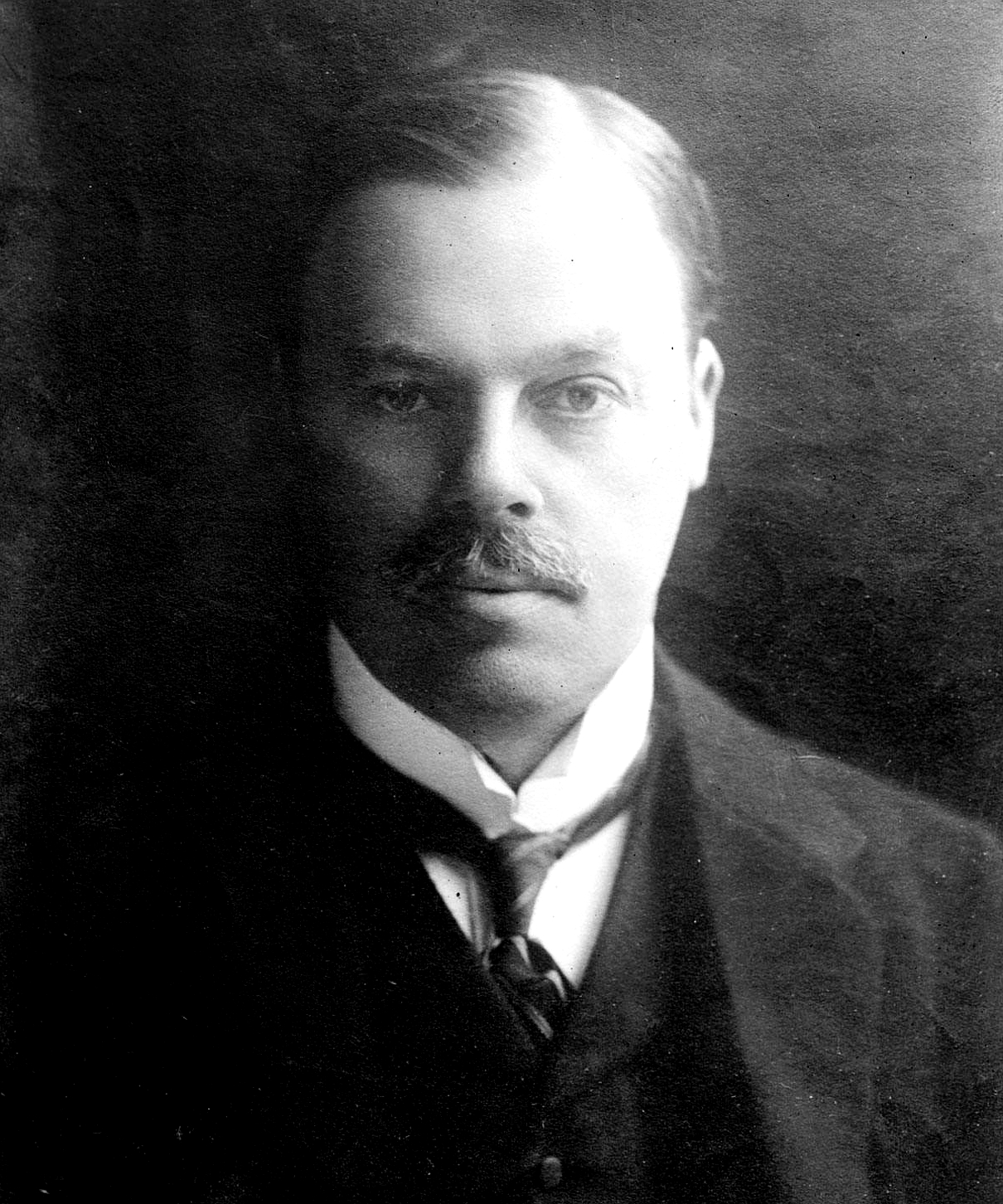
Harold Sidney Harmsworth, 1st Viscount Rothermere (1868–1940)

The Harold Vyvyan Harmsworth Professorship is an endowed chair in American history at the University of Oxford, tenable for one year. The Harmsworth Professorship was established by Harold Sidney Harmsworth, 1st Viscount Rothermere (1868–1940) in memory of his son Harold Vyvyan Alfred St George, who was killed in the First World War, and whose favourite subject was history. Lord Rothermere also established a Harmsworth Professorship in imperial and naval history at Cambridge University in honour of his son Vere, who was killed in the same war. The King Edward VII Professor of English Literature at Cambridge University was endowed by Sir Harold Harmsworth in memory of King Edward VII, who died in 1910.

The Harmsworth Professorship was inaugurated in 1922 with an endowment of £20,000. Holders of the chair are affiliated to Queen's College, Oxford, and, since 2001, the Rothermere American Institute. The Rothermere American Institute also houses the Vere Harmsworth Library, named in honour of Vere Harmsworth, 3rd Viscount Rothermere.

The Harmsworth Professor is selected by the Electors of Oxford and a Committee on the Harold Vyvyan Harmsworth Professorship in American History at the American Historical Association, established in 1939.

== Holders of the Harmsworth Professorship ==
- Samuel E. Morison (1922–1925)
- Robert McNutt McElroy (1925–1939)
- Thomas Jefferson Wertenbaker (1939)
- Allan Nevins (1940)
- Vacant (1941)
- Walter Prescott Webb (1942)
- Vacant (1943)
- Thomas J. Wertenbaker (1944)
- Vacant (1945)
- Walt W. Rostow (1946)
- David M. Potter (1947)
- Louis M. Hacker (1948)
- Merrill Jensen (1949)
- Charles S. Sydnor (1950)
- Lawrence H. Gipson (1951)
- Henry Steele Commager (1952)
- Ray Allen Billington (1953)
- C. Vann Woodward (1954)
- Frank Friedel (1955)
- Arthur Bestor (1956)
- Walter Johnson (1957)
- Arthur S. Link (1958)
- David H. Donald (1959)
- George E. Mowry (1960)
- Kenneth Stampp (1961)
- Richard N. Current (1962)
- Frank Vandiver (1963)
- Allan Nevins (1964)
- Bell I. Wiley (1965)
- T. Harry Williams (1966)
- Don Fehrenbacher (1967)
- Fletcher Melvin Green (1968)
- David Brion Davis (1969)
- Charles Grier Sellers (1970)
- William Leuchtenburg (1971)
- Oscar Handlin (1972)
- Carl Degler (1973)
- Richard Clement Wade (1974)
- Jack P. Greene (1975)
- John Morton Blum (1976)
- Willie Lee Nichols Rose (1977)
- Norman Arthur Graebner (1978)
- Eric McKitrick (1979)
- Morton Keller (1980)
- James T. Patterson (1981)
- Samuel P. Hays (1982)
- John W. Shy (1983)
- J. Morgan Kousser (1984)
- David Hackett Fischer (1985)
- David M. Kennedy (1986)
- Richard Slator Dunn (1987)
- George M. Fredrickson (1988)
- Daniel Walker Howe (1989)
- Joyce Appleby (1990)
- James A. Henretta (1991)
- John Lewis Gaddis (1992)
- Eric Foner (1993)
- Robert Dallek (1994)
- David Kennedy (1995)
- Robert Middlekauff (1996)
- Ernest R. May (1997)
- Alan Brinkley (1998)
- Robin W. Winks (1999)
- T. H. Breen (2000)
- David Hollinger (2001)
- Melvyn P. Leffler (2002)
- Richard R. Beeman (2003)
- Joel H. Silbey (2004)
- Kathryn Kish Sklar (2005)
- Linda K. Kerber (2006)
- Lizabeth Cohen (2007)
- Peter S. Onuf (2008)
- Robin Kelley (2009)
- Ian R. Tyrrell (2010)
- Philip D. Morgan (2011)
- Gary Gerstle (2012)
- Richard J. M. Blackett (2013)
- Annette Gordon-Reed (2014)
- Kristin L. Hoganson (2015)
- Alan Taylor (2016)
- Elliott West (2017)
- Barbara D. Savage (2018)
- Peter C. Mancall (2019–2021)†
- Patrick Griffin (2021)
- Bruce Schulman (2022)
- Elizabeth R. Varon (2023)
- Lisa McGirr (2024)
- Eliga Gould (2025)
- Laurie Maffly-Kipp (2026)

†Professorship interrupted and later resumed due to the COVID-19 pandemic
