= Battle Cry of Freedom: The Civil War Era =

1988 history book by James M. McPherson

- First edition cover
- Author: James M. McPherson
- Series: The Oxford History of the United States
- Genre: Narrative history
- Publisher: Oxford University Press
- Publication date: February 25, 1988
- Media type: Print (hardcover)
- Pages: 904
- ISBN: 978-0195038637
- Preceded by: What Hath God Wrought: The Transformation of America, 1815–1848
- Followed by: The Republic for Which It Stands: The United States During Reconstruction and the Gilded Age, 1865–1896

Battle Cry of Freedom: The Civil War Era is a 1988 book on the American Civil War, written by James M. McPherson. It is the sixth volume of the Oxford History of the United States series. An abridged, illustrated version was published in 2003. The book won the 1989 Pulitzer Prize for History.

== Content ==
Battle Cry of Freedom is a narrative history of two decades of the history of the United States from the outbreak of the Mexican–American War to the Civil War's ending at Appomattox. Thus, it examined the Civil War era, not just the war, as it combined the social, military and political events of the period within a single narrative framework. Historian Hugh Brogan, reviewing the book, commends McPherson for initially describing "the republic at midcentury" as "a divided society, certainly, and a violent one, but not one in which so appalling a phenomenon as civil war is likely. So it must have seemed to most Americans at the time. Slowly, slowly the remote possibility became horrible actuality; and Mr. McPherson sees to it that it steals up on his readers in the same way."

A central concern of this work is the multiple interpretations of freedom. In an interview, McPherson claimed: "Both sides in the Civil War professed to be fighting for the same 'freedoms' established by the American Revolution and the Constitution their forefathers fought for in the Revolution—individual freedom, democracy, a republican form of government, majority rule, free elections, etc. For Southerners, the Revolution was a war of secession from the tyranny of the British Empire, just as their war was a war of secession from Yankee tyranny. For Northerners, their fight was to sustain the government established by the Constitution with its guaranties of rights and liberties."

== Reception ==
Battle Cry of Freedom was an immediate commercial and critical success, spending 16 weeks on The New York Times hardcover bestseller list with an additional 12 weeks on the paperback list. Historian Mark E. Neely Jr. praised the book's wide-ranging coverage, writing that in the book McPherson "seems equally interested in all aspects of the Civil War" including but not limited to diplomacy, inflation, legislation, medicine, military campaigns, and prisoner-of-war exchanges. Dudley T. Cornish cited the lack of naval history as the book's "only discernable flaw" and further commented by saying "the book's strongest connecting themes are the comprehensive discussions of diplomatic, economic, industrial, political, and social aspects of the nation's travail." Michael P. Johnson regarded the book as an overarching synthesis of evidence that refutes Walt Whitman's claim that the war should primarily be understood from the perspective of the sufferers of battle. Johnson asserts that the book classifies the Civil War as revolving primarily around the politics of slavery, and he states that its title "invites the conceptual miscalculation: Victory = Freedom", this characterization being Johnson's main critique. Still, he praises it for being "as a narrative of wartime maneuvers-both political and military-[...] unsurpassed".

Robert Franklin Durden noted McPherson as "in the nationalist tradition of [James Ford] Rhodes and [Allan] Nevins" and his borrowed view of southerners as "preemptive counterrevolutionaries" from Arno Mayer. Harold Hyman positively compared its compactness to Peter Parish's America's Civil War (1975), but criticized its misleading phraseology regarding geographic mobility of wage earners, his use of "women of questionable virtue", "troop train" when referring to events in 1861, the exclusive riding prowess of "the sons of Virginia gentry", and including the greying of Robert E. Lee's beard instead of expanding on important issues such as slave marriage. However, he concluded readers "will nevertheless reap large rewards from its pages." Writing for The New York Times, Brogan described it as "...the best one-volume treatment of its subject I have ever come across. It may actually be the best ever published."

== Editions ==
- McPherson, James M. (2003) [1988]. Battle Cry of Freedom: The Civil War Era. Oxford University Press. ISBN 978-0-19-503863-7.
- McPherson, James M. (2003). The Illustrated Battle Cry of Freedom: The Civil War Era. Oxford University Press. ISBN 0-19-515-901-2.

== See also ==
- For Cause and Comrades: Why Men Fought in the Civil War
- The Civil War: A Narrative
- Bibliography of Ulysses S. Grant
- Bibliography of the American Civil War

== Sources ==
- Cornish, Dudley T. (1989). "Review of Battle Cry of Freedom: The Civil War Era". The Journal of American History. 75 (4): 1333–1334. doi:10.2307/1908702. ISSN 0021-8723. JSTOR 1908702.
- Durden, Robert F. (1989). "Review of Battle Cry of Freedom: The Civil War Era". The Journal of Southern History. 55 (3): 460–461. doi:10.2307/2208406. ISSN 0022-4642. JSTOR 2208406.
- Hyman, Harold M. (1990). "Review of Battle Cry of Freedom: The Civil War Era". The American Historical Review. 95 (1): 261–262. doi:10.2307/2163143. ISSN 0002-8762. JSTOR 2163143.
- Johnson, Michael P. (1989). "Battle Cry of Freedom?". Reviews in American History. 17 (2): 214–218. doi:10.2307/2702921. ISSN 0048-7511. JSTOR 2702921.
- Neely, Mark E. Jr. (Spring 1990). "Battle Cry of Freedom: The Civil War Era. By James M. McPherson". Georgia Historical Quarterly. 74 (1): 166–168. JSTOR 40582121.

Preceded by The Launching of Modern American Science, 1846–1876	Pulitzer Prize for History; 1989 (shared with Parting the Waters)	Succeeded by In Our Image
