= Bruce J. Schulman =

American historian (born 1959)

- Born: December 16, 1959 (age 66); New York City, U.S.

Academic background
- Education: Yale University (BA); Stanford University (MA, PhD)

Academic work
- Discipline: History
- Sub-discipline: American history
- Institutions: University of California, Los Angeles; Boston University

Bruce J. Schulman (born December 16, 1959) is an American historian, currently the William E. Huntington professor at Boston University. From 2022 to 2023, Schulman served as the Harmsworth Professor of American History at The Queen's College, Oxford. Schulman is a 2025 Guggenheim Fellow.

According to his faculty profile, Schulman is writing the volume for the Oxford History of the United States covering the years 1896-1929.

== Background ==
Schulman was born in New York City on December 16, 1959. He received a BA in history from Yale University in 1981, and received an MA and PhD in history from Stanford University in 1982 and 1987 respectively.

== Academic career ==
Schulman was appointed as an assistant professor of history at the University of California, Los Angeles in July 1987. He left UCLA in December 1993 and joined Boston University as a professor of history in January 1994. From June 1997 to September 2002, Schulman served as the director of the American and New England Studies program at the university. From January 2010 to July 2013 he chaired the university's History Department.

Schulman currently directs the Institute for American Political History at Boston University. He was appointed the Huntington Professor of History in July 2008.

== Publications ==
Schulman is the author of three books on American political and economic history in the twentieth century. He has also written numerous opinion articles on American politics for The Washington Post and Politico.

== Recognition ==
While at UCLA in 1993, Schulman won the Charles and Harriet Luckman Distinguished Teaching Award and the Eby Award for the Art of Teaching. In 2006, Schulman received the Nancy Lyman Roelker Mentorship Award from the American Historical Association for his doctoral supervision.

== Books ==
- From Cotton Belt to Sunbelt: Federal Policy, Economic Development, and the Transformation of the South, 1938–1980 (Oxford University Press, 1991)
- Lyndon B. Johnson and American Liberalism: A Brief Biography with Documents (Bedford Books of St. Martin's Press, 1994)
- The Seventies: The Great Shift in American Culture, Politics, and Society (Free Press, 2001)
