= Noah Michael Levine =

Noah Michael Levine (born January 12, 1962, in Nyack, New York), is an Audie Award-winning voice actor, actor, screenwriter and film producer.

Levine has performed on stage and screen in New York City, Los Angeles, San Francisco and Wilmington, North Carolina. He has appeared in many films, including Phenomenon and Primary Colors with John Travolta as well as on the small screen - including several episodes of the award-winning BBC series, Days That Shook the World, One Tree Hill and the short-lived but cult followed Surface on NBC. He also wrote, produced and starred in the critically acclaimed short film, The Eighth Plane.

In April 2008, Levine finished principal photography on the short motion picture, Goldbug. Shot on location in Venice, Italy, Paris and Nice, France, Monte Carlo, Monaco and Toronto, Canada, this marks his second turn as writer, executive producer and star on a project through his eleuthra productions company. The film was co-produced and directed by Neil G. De Sousa Productions.

As of 2019, Levine is a full-time audiobook narrator and producer with over 330 titles, an Audie award, and an Independent Audiobook award.

== See also ==
- Days That Shook the World
- The Republic for Which It Stands: The United States During Reconstruction and the Gilded Age, 1865-1896
