= The Republic for Which It Stands =

History of the United States from 1865 to 1896

The Republic for Which It Stands: The United States During Reconstruction and the Gilded Age, 1865–1896
- First edition cover
- Author: Richard White
- Audio read by: Noah Michael Levine
- Language: English
- Subject: History of the United States during Reconstruction and the Gilded Age.
- Genre: Non-fiction, history
- Publisher: Oxford University Press, Audible
- Publication date: September 1, 2017
- Pages: 968
- ISBN: 978-0199735815
- Preceded by: Battle Cry of Freedom: The Civil War Era
- Website: Oxford University Press

The Republic for Which It Stands: The United States During Reconstruction and the Gilded Age, 1865–1896 is a history of the United States during Reconstruction and the Gilded Age, written by Richard White and published by Oxford University Press in 2017 in a hardback edition and in 2019 in a paperback edition, and by Audible Studios as an audiobook in 2018. It is part of the Oxford History of the United States.

== Critical reception ==
Most reviewers praised the book, and many described White as being a particularly fit choice for the series entry. Kirkus Reviews wrote "[a] highly qualified historian offers a dense, sweeping history of a nation on the move", and Publishers Weekly declared "White’s great achievement is to capture the drabbest, least-redeeming three decades of American history with unimpeachable authority." Gregory Downs said "[t]his union of an iconoclastic historian and an icon-making series has produced a surprising, ultimately fulfilling match of author and age". Walter Russell Mead said "White’s fascinating and comprehensive book could not be more timely", and he hailed the book for its "clear prose and strong narrative drive that makes this complicated story easier to understand." Historian Jeffrey Sklansky stated White's "previous eld-shaping studies of Native American history, Western history, environmental history, and business history make him well-suited to offer an overarching understanding of an era of climactic upheavals in all of these realms".

Sean Wilentz praised the book overall, stating "[t]here is almost nothing about the era that White fails to treat with intelligence and style". While he found the book "pass[es] too quickly over the fruits of Southern Reconstruction before its downfall in the mid-1870s" and criticism of Ulysses S. Grant antiquated, Wilentz believed "[t]he narrative improves at the Panic of 1873".

Stephen Aron favorably reviewed the book as "offer[ing] not only an outstanding synthesis, but also an engaging narrative." He remarked that White "pays far more attention to the western half of the North American continent" and emphasizes "the era's failed promises" more in comparison to the series' more "whiggish" coverage of the preceding time periods.

Trevon Logan, writing for the Journal of Economic History, admired the book's attention to social issues such as gender, religion, Native Americans, immigrants, and race, and he "was surprised to see a strong interaction with the work of economic historians". Logan ultimately declares "White has produced a book that is certain to be the first that scholars and the lay public would turn to understand any feature of this time."

In a mostly positive review, Tyler Anbinder summarized the work as a "beautifully written, impressively researched study of an important but often neglected era", and remarking "[e]ven experts will learn something new." However, Anbinder believed the book suffered from an over reliance on secondary sources. In one example, Anbinder describes "[White] name[ing] eleven New York 'neighborhoods' whose very names epitomized how 'horrible' they were, but in fact only two of the eleven were actually neighborhoods. The rest were alleyways, or in some cases the nicknames of single tenement buildings (194)." In another instance, Anbinder claims White utilized sources which overemphasized immigrant poverty: "Immigrants are depicted as being so routinely underfed that their growth was 'stunted' by malnutrition (514). Yet, as historians Hasia R. Diner and Donna Gabaccia pointed out years ago in award-winning books, most immigrants raved about the amount and variety of the food they ate in America. Meat, a rare treat for poor Irish and Italian immigrants in their homelands, was something that most of them ate in America not only every day, but at every meal."

Allen Guelzo criticized the book for what he perceived as White's bias, stating "his larger motivation clearly lies in his conviction that the current Age of Trump is simply a replay of the Gilded Age". Guelzo found White's portrayal of the concept of free labor and industrial progress too cynical, saying "[y]ou do not have to love the Gilded Age to sense something terribly awry in White’s grinding recitation of its nastiness, or his single-minded focus on economic immiseration." He also critiqued what he thought to be insufficient coverage of the era, listing omissions such as "diplomatic affairs (including the purchase of Alaska), the Fall River Line, women’s colleges, public lecturers, the great bicycle craze, [and] the dime novel", and he further mentions omissions in cultural and intellectual history.

The book won the Ellis W. Hawley Prize and was featured in a Wall Street Journal list of five best books of the Gilded Age.

== See also ==
- Industrial Revolution in the United States
- Nadir of American race relations
- End of slavery in the United States

== Bibliography ==
- Adams, Kevin (Winter 2018). "White, Richard The Republic for Which It Stands: The United States during Reconstruction and the Gilded Age, 1865-1896". Civil War Book Review. 20 (1). doi:10.31390/cwbr.20.1.12.
- Anbinder, Tyler (2018). "Richard White. The Republic for Which It Stands: The United States During Reconstruction and the Gilded Age, 1865–1896". The American Historical Review. 123 (5): 1666–1667. doi:10.1093/ahr/rhy353. JSTOR 26581603.
- Aron, Stephen (Summer 2018). "The Republic for Which It Stands: The United States During Reconstruction and the Gilded Age, 1865–1896. The Oxford History of the United States. By Richard White". Western Historical Quarterly. 49 (2): 209–210. doi:10.1093/whq/why015.
- Cobb, Tom (2018). "Richard White, The Republic for Which It Stands: The United States During Reconstruction and the Gilded Age, 1865–1896". American Studies in Scandinavia. 50 (2): 128–130. doi:10.22439/asca.v50i2.5786.
- Cobb, James C. (2022). C. Vann Woodward: America's Historian. University of North Carolina Press. ISBN 978-1-4696-7021-8.
- Dierksheide, Christa (2019). "Reviewed work: The Republic for Which It Stands: The United States During Reconstruction and the Gilded Age, 1865–1896, Richard White". Great Plains Quarterly. 39 (2): 216–217. doi:10.1353/gpq.2019.0028. JSTOR 26643078. S2CID 167035990.
- Downs, Gregory (March 2019). "The Republic for Which It Stands: The United States During Reconstruction and the Gilded Age, 1865–1896. By Richard White". Journal of American History. 105 (4): 976–977. doi:10.1093/jahist/jaz013.
- Heath, Andrew (2019). "The Republic for Which It Stands: The United States During Reconstruction and the Gilded Age, 1865-1896, by Richard White". American Nineteenth Century History. 19 (1): 78–79. doi:10.1080/14664658.2019.1606498.
- Holliday, Robert (2018). "Reviewed work: The Republic for Which It Stands: The United States During Reconstruction and the Gilded Age, 1865–1896, Richard White". Tennessee Historical Quarterly. 77 (1): 100–102. JSTOR 27069299.
- Logan, Trevor (March 2019). "The Republic for Which it Stands: The United States During Reconstruction and the Gilded Age, 1865–1896. By Richard White". Journal of Economic History. 79 (1): 305–308. doi:10.1017/S0022050718000864.
- Mead, Walter Russell (2018). "Reviewed work: The Republic for Which It Stands: The United States During Reconstruction and the Gilded Age, 1865–1896, Richard White". Foreign Affairs. 97 (2): 175. JSTOR 44822107.
- Nelson, Scott Reynolds (January 2018). "Shots Fired: How Violent Conflict Connects Reconstruction with the History of the Gilded Age". Journal of the Gilded Age and Progressive Era. 17 (1): 208–209. doi:10.1017/S153778141700069X.
- Sklansky, Jeffrey (Summer 2018). "Reviewed Work: The Republic for Which It Stands: The United States During Reconstruction and the Gilded Age, 1865–1896. By Richard White". Business History Review. 92 (2): 355–360. doi:10.1017/S0007680518000405.
- Summers, Mark Wahlgren (2018). "Reviewed work: The Republic for Which It Stands: The United States During Reconstruction and the Gilded Age, 1865-1896, Richard White". The Register of the Kentucky Historical Society. 116 (3/4): 546–549. doi:10.1353/khs.2018.0074. JSTOR 45013605. S2CID 166757643.
- Taillon, Paul Michel (2019). "Reviewed work: The Republic for Which It Stands: The United States During Reconstruction and the Gilded Age, 1865–1896, Richard White". Australasian Journal of American Studies. 38 (2): 77–80. JSTOR 26925499.
- Waugh, Joan (2018). "The Republic for Which It Stands: The United States During Reconstruction and the Gilded Age, 1865–1896 by Richard White (review)". Journal of the Civil War Era. 8 (3): 550–553. doi:10.1353/cwe.2018.0064. JSTOR 26483650. S2CID 165490632.
- Williams, Patrick G. (2019). "Reviewed Work: The Republic for Which It Stands: The United States During Reconstruction and the Gilded Age, 1865–1896, Richard White". The Southwestern Historical Quarterly. 122 (3): 349–352. doi:10.1353/swh.2019.0008. JSTOR 26633929. S2CID 151087389.

== Publication history ==
- 2017, Hardback original edition.
- 2018, Audio book, published by Audible.
- 2019, Paperback 1st edition reprint.
