= James T. Patterson (historian) =

American historian (born 1935)

James T. Patterson Ph.D.
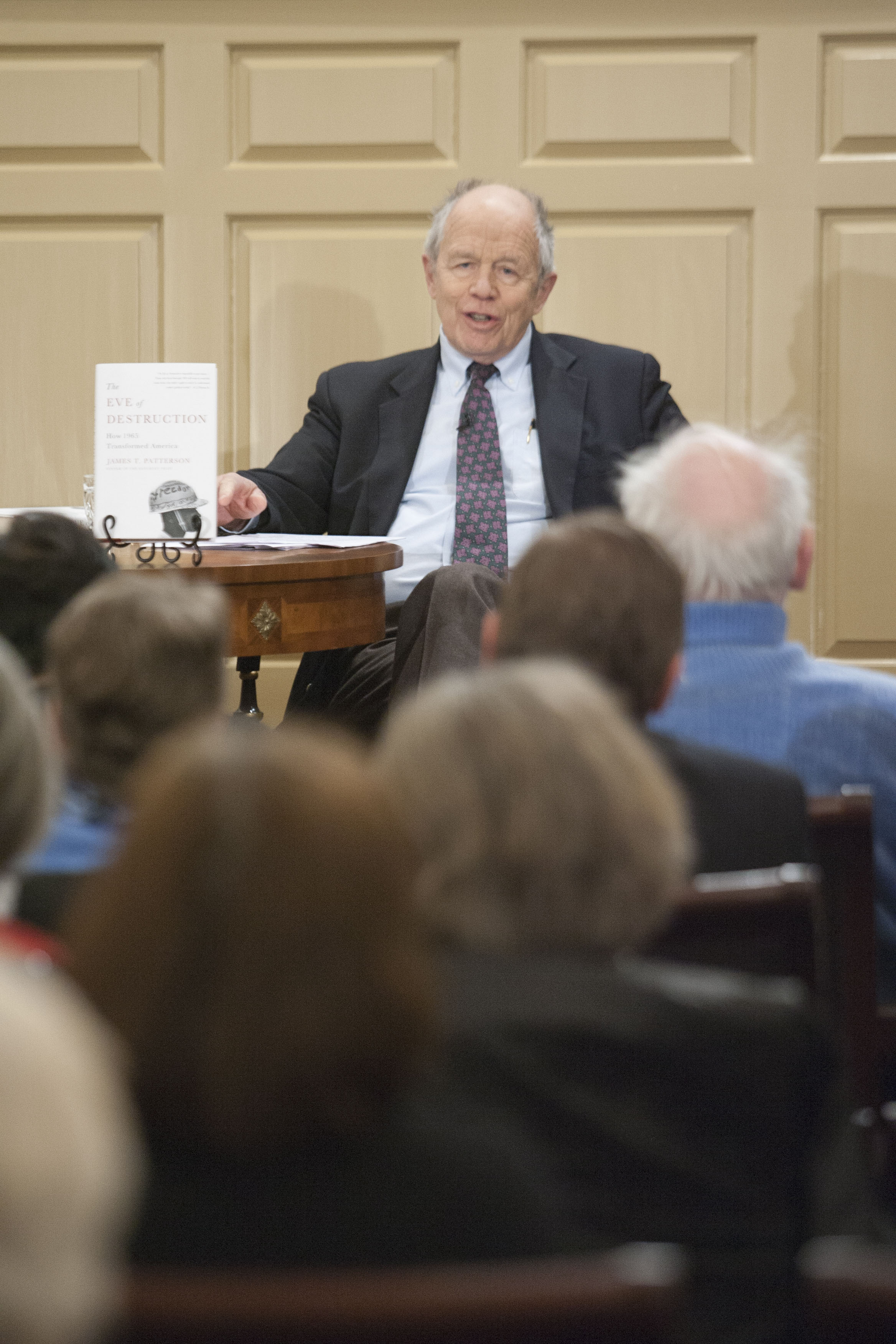
- Patterson at the Miller Center of Public Affairs in 2013
- Born: February 12, 1935 (age 91); Old Lyme, Connecticut, U.S.
- Occupations: Professor, historian
- Parent: J. Tyler Patterson (father)
- Awards: Frederick Jackson Turner Award; Guggenheim Fellow; Bancroft Prize

Academic background
- Education: Harvard University

Academic work
- Discipline: History
- Sub-discipline: Political, social, medical, educational, and legal history, as well as race relations
- Institutions: Ford Foundation Professor of History at Brown University; Harold Vyvyan Harmsworth Professor of American History at Oxford University
- Notable works: See § Works

James T. Patterson (born February 12, 1935, in Old Lyme, Connecticut) is an American historian, who was the Ford Foundation Professor of History at Brown University for 30 years. He was educated at Harvard University. His research interests include political history, legal history, and social history, as well as the history of medicine, race relations, and education. In 1981–1982, he was the Harold Vyvyan Harmsworth Professor of American History at Oxford University.

== Early life ==
Patterson was born and raised in Old Lyme, Connecticut, son of J. Tyler Patterson, a member of the Connecticut State House of Representatives who went on to serve as its speaker." He attended the Hotchkiss School before enrolling at Williams College, where he earned a B.A. in 1957.

He then served for sixth months in the U.S. Army before taking a job at the Hartford Courant, where, he says, "I was responsible for writing 25 inches of news every day, and I learned to write quickly, using strong verbs, because I knew that the audience was made up of American adults at the breakfast table. This developed my style of writing, which seeks to be strongly narrative."

In fall of 1960, Patterson entered Harvard University, earning an M.A. in 1961 and a Ph.D. in history in 1964.

== Career ==
He started his teaching career at Indiana University, moving to Brown University in 1972 until his retirement in 2002. His first three books (1967–1972) were "straightforward political history. I had always been very interested in politics before moving to academia."

For this work Patterson received the Frederick Jackson Turner Award from the Organization of American Historians (1966), two fellowships from the National Endowment for the Humanities, and a Guggenheim Fellowship. He was also the recipient of an Indiana University Teaching Award and the Ohioana Award, a book prize for his 1972 volume on Taft.

In the 1970s, Patterson noticed a trend away from the academic writing of political history and toward an emphasis on societal issues such as race, class, and gender. In keeping with this trend, in 1987 he published The Dread Disease: Cancer and Modern American Culture, chronicling the societal reaction to the disease from the 1880s to the 1980s, and exploring the social tensions and the persistence of fear caused by its specter, and how it reveals divisions in American life.

In 1997, Patterson published Grand Expectations: The United States, 1945–1974, volume 10 of the Oxford History of the United States, covering political, cultural, and economic events of the postwar period through the resignation of U.S. President Richard Nixon. It was praised by historians and readers alike for its balanced commentary and readability. In his next four books, Patterson tackled the civil rights case of Brown v. Board of Education, the period from the Watergate era to the Bush v. Gore election of 2000, the Moynihan Report, and the seminal year 1965.

== Notable quotations ==
"The historian helps people understand the 'pastness of the past.' We do this with thorough research from original sources. I don't believe that history can be instrumental as a guideline as to how you should act. But it will help you understand the immense variety and oddity of human nature."

== Awards ==
- 1966 Frederick Jackson Turner Award for Congressional Conservatism and the New Deal: The Growth of the Conservative Coalition in Congress, 1933–1939
- 1968 Guggenheim Fellow
- 1997 Bancroft Prize in American History for Grand Expectations: The United States, 1945–1974

== Works ==
- Patterson, James T. (November 24, 2012). "Everything you know about the 1960s is wrong". Salon. Archived from the original on November 24, 2012.
- James T. Patterson (2012), The Eve of Destruction: How 1965 Transformed America
- James T. Patterson (2010), Freedom Is Not Enough: The Moynihan Report and America's Struggle over Black Family Life from LBJ to Obama
- James T. Patterson (2009), "The Civil Rights Movement: Major Events and Legacies"
- James T. Patterson (2006), "Jeremiahs and grand expectations", Brown University
- Steven F. Lawson; Charles M. Payne (2006). Debating the Civil Rights Movement, 1945-1968. Rowman & Littlefield. ISBN 978-0-7425-5109-1.
- James T. Patterson (2005). Restless Giant: The United States from Watergate to Bush v. Gore. Oxford University Press. ISBN 978-0-19-512216-9.
- James T. Patterson (2001), Brown v. Board of Education: A Civil Rights Milestone and Its Troubled Legacy
- James T. Patterson (1996). Grand Expectations: The United States, 1945-1974. Oxford University Press. ISBN 978-0-19-511797-4.
- James T. Patterson (1987). The Dread Disease: Cancer and Modern American Culture. Harvard University Press. ISBN 978-0-674-21626-6.
- James T. Patterson (1981). America's Struggle Against Poverty, 1900-1994. Cambridge, MA: Harvard University Press. ISBN 978-0-674-03123-4. Archived from the original on 2016-03-04 – via Questia. (1981, 1986, 1994, 2000)
- James T. Patterson (1973), America in the Twentieth Century: A History (4th ed. 1994; 5th ed. 1999)
- James T. Patterson (1972), Mr. Republican: A Biography of Robert A. Taft
- James T. Patterson (1967), The New Deal and the States: Federalism in Transition
- James T. Patterson (1967). Congressional Conservatism and the New Deal: The Growth of the Conservative Coalition in Congress, 1933-1939. University of Kentucky Press. (reprint 2008 ISBN 978-1-59740-417-4)
