= What Hath God Wrought: The Transformation of America, 1815–1848 =

2007 history book by Daniel Walker Howe

- First edition cover
- Author: Daniel Walker Howe
- Series: Oxford History of the United States
- Subject: History of the United States
- Publisher: Oxford University Press
- Publication date: October 29, 2007
- Media type: Print (hardcover)
- Pages: 928
- Awards: Pulitzer Prize; New-York Historical Society Book Prize
- ISBN: 978-0-19-507894-7
- OCLC: 122701433
- Preceded by: Empire of Liberty: A History of the Early Republic, 1789–1815 by Gordon S. Wood
- Followed by: Battle Cry of Freedom: The Civil War Era by James M. McPherson

What Hath God Wrought: The Transformation of America, 1815–1848 is a nonfiction book about the history of the United States written by historian Daniel Walker Howe. Published in 2007 as part of the Oxford History of the United States series, the book offers a synthesis history of the early-nineteenth-century United States in a braided narrative that interweaves accounts of national politics, new communication technologies, emergent religions, and mass reform movements. The winner of multiple book prizes, including the 2008 Pulitzer Prize for History, reviewers widely praised What Hath God Wrought. Historian Richard Carwardine said it "lays powerful claim to being the best work ever written on this period of the American past."

== Development ==
In the 1950s, historians C. Vann Woodward and Richard Hofstadter envisioned a multivolume history of the United States, the Oxford History of the United States, modeled on the Oxford History of England. They began their co-editorship with Oxford University Press in earnest in 1961 and reached out to historians to request manuscripts. For the volume on United States history during what was popularly called the "Age of Jackson", Woodward and Hofstadter chose between William W. Freehling and Charles Grier Sellers; Hofstadter considered Sellers's prose inadequate, so the coeditors initially appointed Freehling to the task, but after Kenneth M. Stampp—initially contracted to write the series' volume on the American Civil War—dropped from the project, Freehling asked to be reassigned to the Civil War book, and they granted him that request, leading Hofstadter and Woodward to in 1969 have Sellers replace Freehling as author of the planned Jacksonian era volume.

Hofstadter died in 1970, before the series could publish any of its volumes; Woodward continued as series editor with the assistance of Oxford University Press editor Sheldon Meyer until 1999, when they passed on editorship to David M. Kennedy and Peter Ginna. Sellers submitted a partial draft to Woodward in 1987, but Woodward disliked the result, considering Sellers's manuscript too abstract and spare on specific historical actors, and he advised Sellers to "balance off" the manuscript's inclusion of theories about human sexuality and masturbation with more material about politics, economics, and war. Woodward ultimately rejected Sellers's manuscript for the series, informing Sellers in 1990 that he and Meyers believed the text would confuse lay audiences and that "it would be a mistake to use it here" in the Oxford series. Journalists attributed this rejection to Sellers's submission either being too focused on economics or too pessimistic about the United States during the era; Oxford University Press published Sellers's book separately in 1991 as The Market Revolution: Jacksonian America, 1815–1846. To replace Sellers for the period, the series contracted Daniel Walker Howe, at the time a professor of history at the University of California, Los Angeles and an expert in the early nineteenth-century United States. Howe's manuscript was under review at the press by the end of 2006.

== Content and themes ==
What Hath God Wrought: The Transformation of America, 1815–1848 tells a history of the United States from the Battle of New Orleans to the end of the Mexican–American War. Per its title, national transformation is the book's major through line, and Howe charts how during this period the United States politically integrated into a pluralistic, continental nation with mass political organizations, communication tools, and transportation technologies.

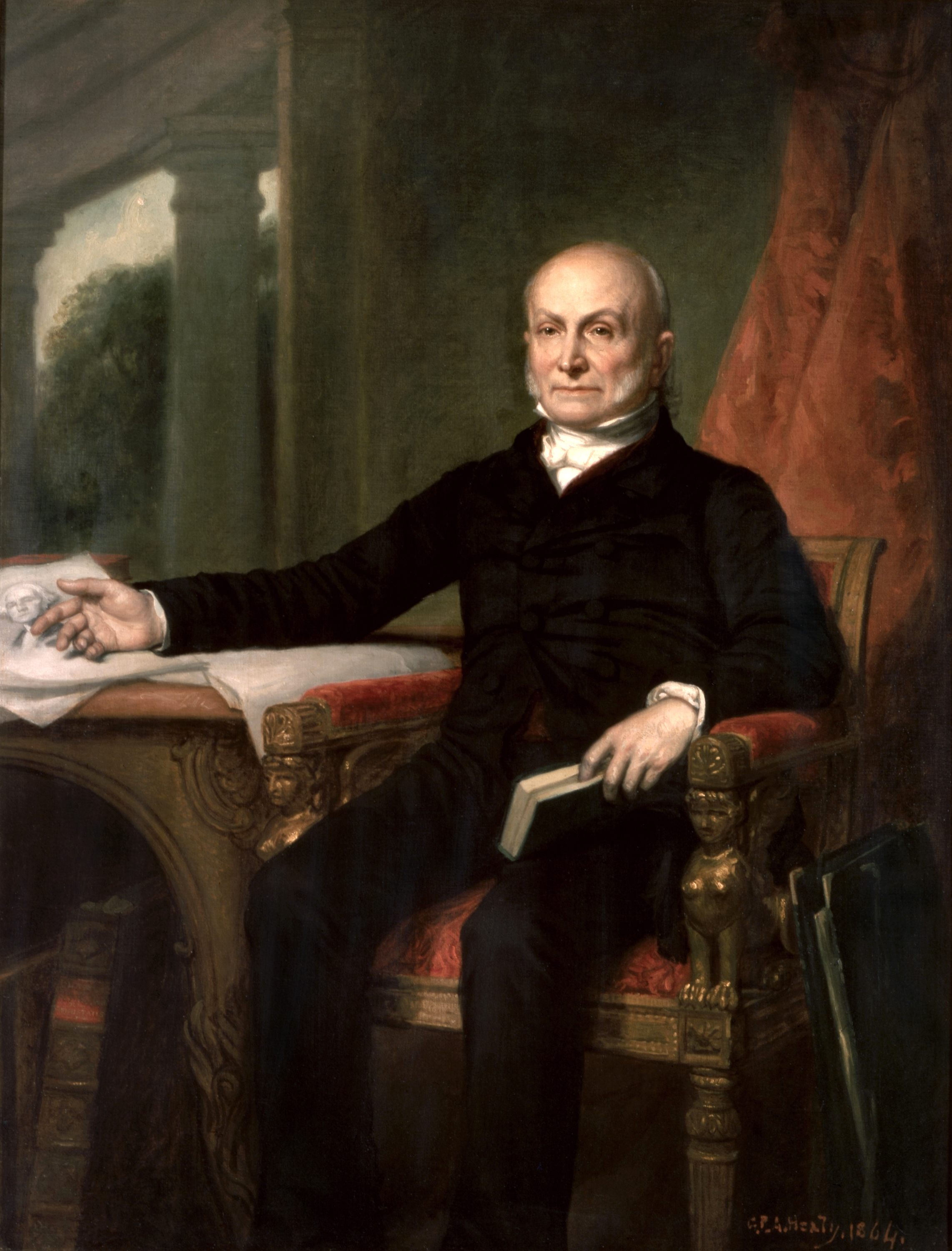
Official presidential portrait of John Quincy Adams, by George Peter Alexander Healy, painted 1858

=== Politics ===
More than half of the book's twenty chapters focus on political topics, and in the words of reviewer Jenny Wahl, the book "casts the first half of the nineteenth century as a struggle between Democrats and Whigs over the future of America". David Henkin describes the approach as remaining "attached to an older model of political history" that nevertheless achieves "admirable" versatility. In a retrospective about the book, Howe explained that he used politics as "the skeleton of the narrative", which he "flesh[ed] out with economic, social, and cultural history", because "politics is about power", and "[t]hose who wield power often shape events."

In its political arc, What Hath God Wrought narrates the undoing of the Era of Good Feelings, the rise of the Democratic and Whig parties, and the clash between the two parties' competing visions for the future of the United States. Holding that democracy and capitalism were already more or less assured and accepted by voting Americans, Howe portrays a young nation in which the questions of the era revolved around rights and sociopolitical inclusion for women and people of color. Departing from long-popular interpretations of the era but building on a contemporaneous "rehabilitation of the Whigs" in American historiography, What Hath God Wrought casts the Whig party and its luminaries as its primary political protagonists. Howe dedicates the book to the memory of John Quincy Adams—the "political nemesis" of Andrew Jackson, according to historian Jill Lepore—and the Whig Party that Adams affiliated with figures in the book in association with antislavery politics and women's rights. Rather than depict Whigs as stuffy representatives of gentility, Howe spotlights their advocacy of education and the arts, their support for internal economic development, their opposition to indigenous expulsion, and their participation in reform movements such as antislavery and women's rights.

Howe fastidiously abstains from the long-popular phrases "Age of Jackson" or "Jacksonian democracy" to describe the era on the grounds that rather than bring American people together, Andrew Jackson's presidency was divisive: as a person he was intemperate and authoritarian, and his (and his successor Martin Van Buren's) politics focused on entrenching white male power and excluding women, American Indians, and African Americans. In Howe's words, "Jacksonian Democracy" was "originally the name of the Democratic Party, not a general characterization of the United States". While the Whigs had a proactive vision for the United States, Jacksonian Democrats were obstructionist, acting mostly to stop the Whig agenda, prevent government interference with state-driven expansions of slavery and violence against indigenous peoples, and enable local prejudice and persecution against minorities. In a roundtable forum about the book, James Huston said he had "not seen in print a more devastating portrait of Andrew Jackson as a brute, an authoritarian, and a law-breaker."

=== Economics ===
Although Howe claims to "not argue a thesis" in the book, reviewers conclude that What Hath God Wrought implicitly (and sometimes explicitly) works to argue against the "market revolution" thesis promoted by Charles Sellers's 1991 book The Market Revolution: Jacksonian America, 1815–1846. Where Sellers had argued that the early-nineteenth-century United States economy painfully transitioned to market capitalism in a process that destroyed a humbler but happier way of life, Howe instead sees evidence for the growing market being a gradual development, congruent with market economies extant in the eighteenth-century United States. Moreover, economic development was a net positive for Americans' lives as markets became more accessible and luxuries became more affordable. Whiggish regulated capitalism was like a compost that "nourished democracy" by giving Americans more choices about how to behave, communicate, and participate in the world. In the growing economy, there were more diverse occupations, and the opportunities generated by commercialization produced a widespread optimism about human capacity and the national future.

=== Communication ===
What Hath God Wrought characterizes 1815 to 1848 as a time in which a "communications revolution" was one of the most important driving forces shaping history and culture in the United States of that era. A growing print culture, proliferating newspapers, a robust postal service that could deliver by steamboat and train, and, eventually, the electromagnetic telegraph all extended the reach of information that organizations and individuals could propagate with increasingly less time lag. Technology enabled new ideas, whether religious or secular, to spread further than in previous generations, amplifying the voices of mass movements and expanding their audiences.

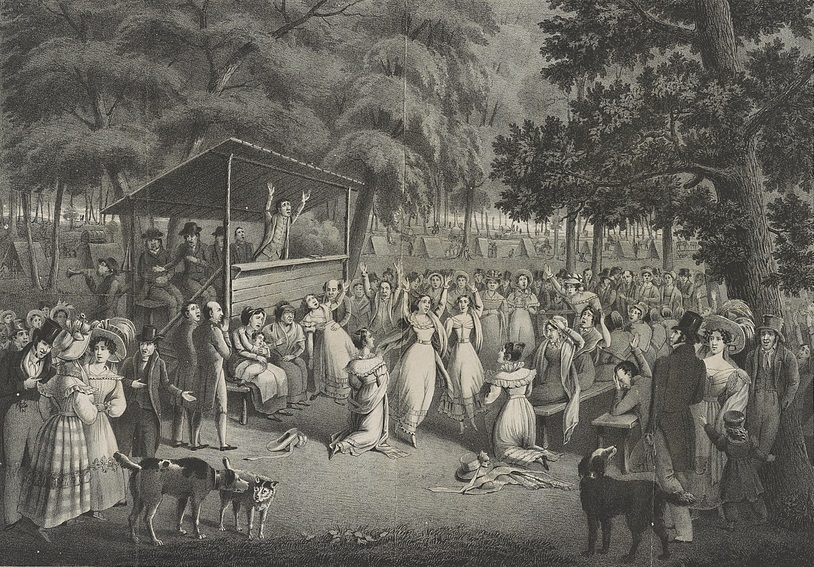
A Methodist camp meeting in the Second Great Awakening (painting by Alexander Rider; lithograph by Hugh Bridport)

=== Religion and reform ===
Four chapters scattered across the book foreground religious movements. What Hath God Wrought renders the Second Great Awakening as a mass phenomenon which Howe contextualizes within broader cultural, economic, and political conditions while simultaneously reading religious experience sensitively and avoiding reductive interpretations. Howe includes Quakerism, Unitarianism, and the Latter Day Saint movement in the Second Great Awakening alongside traditionally recognized Evangelical Protestant denominations, like Methodism. What Hath God Wrought portrays religion as a force in its own right, "a vibrant element of culture that shapes how people see the world", and the narration tends to be sympathetic toward religious people and their experiences.

Religious influence on reform movements is key to What Hath God Wrought's interpretation of the era. Howe grounds the Whigs' optimistic culture of self- and societal-improvement in postmillennial Christian thought and notes the overlap between the Second Great Awakening and the reform impulse. Whig politics and Protestant humanitarianism worked in tandem to promote social reform as postmillennialism galvanized prison reform, new charitable institutions, temperance, women's rights, abolition, and more. Although the period under study is bounded by the Battle of New Orleans and the Mexican–American War, the Seneca Falls Convention for women's rights is the book's true finale, serving as "the representative culmination of the period" and its reform movements.

== Publication ==
Oxford University Press released What Hath God Wrought: The Transformation of America, 1815–1848 in hardcover in 2007, selling it at a retail price of $35 (USD, equivalent to $54 in 2025). Its dust jacket displayed imagery from a historical Whig political banner, depicting a bald eagle at the summit of a rocky outcropping dividing the image in two. Clipper ships and a steamboat sail in the background of the lefthand side; on the right, the banner portrays railroads, bridges, and a train, symbolizing the United States' optimistic culture of innovation at the time and the many technologically enabled transformations which took place. A paperback edition was released two years later, in the autumn of 2009.

== Critical reception ==
Multiple reviewers praised What Hath God Wrought and described it in superlative terms. Publishers Weekly called it "one of the most outstanding syntheses of U. S. history published this decade". Richard Carwardine said What Hath God Wrought "lays powerful claim to being the best work ever written on this period of the American past". Foreign Affairs averred it was "a book that every student of American history and politics should read". James Taylor Carson believed the book was especially successful given its genre, writing that "what makes What Hath God Wrought remarkable is that it successfully does what a great work of synthesis ought to do—it distills the broad sweep of multiple fields of inquiry into a comprehensible narrative of the past that speaks to our present-day concerns."

Reviewers occasionally criticized the book for fumbles. For example, historian Manisha Sinha wrote that What Hath God Wrought understates the Black church's distinctions from predominantly white mainline Protestantism. Mary Ryan considered the book's portrayal of women a mixed, "if not entirely pyrrhic, victory for the field of women's history" because women figured primarily in relation to male-dominated politics.

What Hath God Wrought was read as being relevant to the present. Jim Giardina averred that its emphasis on the nineteenth century's communications revolution seemed to echo the twenty-first century's internet age. Political parallels between Jackson's authoritarian jingoism and the then-contemporary Iraq War led reviewer Steven Conn to surmise that "the story Howe tells of these years amounts to a thinly veiled critique of the present."

The book won several awards, and historian John Lauritz Larson joked that it "[c]ollect[ed] prizes as numerous as Jupiter's moons". In 2007, What Hath God Wrought was a finalist for the National Book Critics Circle award in general nonfiction. By the end of 2008, the book received the Pulitzer Prize for History, the New-York Historical Society Book Prize, the silver medal for Nonfiction at the California Book Awards, and the Society for Historians of the Early American Republic's Best Book Award.

Historian Daniel Feller in 2013 and religious studies scholar Isaac Barnes May in 2018 called What Hath God Wrought a "magisterial history" of the era. In 2014, historian Mark Noll named What Hath God Wrought as one of "his top 5 books for inspiring a passion for history".

== See also ==
- History of the United States (1789–1849)
- Timeline of United States history (1820–1859)
