= Morton Keller =

American historian (1929–2023)

- Born: March 1, 1929; Brooklyn, New York (state)
- Died: January 1, 2018 (aged 88); United States
- Occupations: Historian; Author

Morton Keller (1 March 1929 – 2018) was an American historian, academic and author. He specialized in the history of American legal and political institutions.

== Biography ==
Keller was born on March 1, 1929, in Brooklyn, New York. He was the son of Jacob Keller and Anita Keller. Keller married Phyllis Daytz on September 7, 1951. He died in 2018.

== Education ==
Keller completed his BA degree at the University of Rochester in 1950. He completed his MA and PhD at Harvard University in 1952 and 1956 respectively.

== Career ==
Keller served in the US Navy and then took up an academic career as a historian. He served as the Spector Professor of History Emeritus at Brandeis University. Keller served as the Harold Vyvyan Harmsworth Professor of American History at the University of Oxford in 1980. He had previously taught at the University of North Carolina and the University of Pennsylvania and was a visiting professor at Harvard, Sussex, and Oxford Universities respectively.

== Awards and honours ==
Keller received the Guggenheim Fellowship in 1959-1960. He received the Littleton-Griswold Prize in American Legal History in 1995.

== Bibliography ==
Keller is the author of a number of notable books:

- Affairs of State : public life in late nineteenth century America (Harvard University Press, 1977)
- Making Harvard modern : the rise of America's university (Oxford University Press, 2007)
- America's three regimes : a new political history (Oxford University Press, 2007)
- Obama's time : a history (Oxford University Press, 2015)

== See also ==
- List of Guggenheim Fellowships awarded in 1959
- Strauss–Howe generational theory
- Oxford History of the United States
- Amphitheatrum Johnsonianum
- List of Jewish historians
- Harold Vyvyan Harmsworth Professor of American History
- Joseph Cari Jr.
- Oscar Handlin
