= Freedom from Fear: The American People in Depression and War, 1929–1945 =

1999 book by David M. Kennedy

- First edition cover
- Author: David M. Kennedy
- Series: The Oxford History of the United States
- Genre: Narrative history
- Published: May 1999
- Publisher: Oxford University Press
- Media type: Print
- Pages: 954
- ISBN: 978-0-19-503834-7
- Followed by: Grand Expectations: The United States, 1945–1974

Freedom from Fear: The American People in Depression and War, 1929–1945 is a 1999 nonfiction book by the American historian David M. Kennedy. Published as part of the Oxford History of the United States, Freedom from Fear covers the history of the United States during the Great Depression and World War II. It won the 2000 Pulitzer Prize for History.

== Development ==
Book publisher Oxford University Press produces "Oxford histories", a line of book series usually intended to broadly synthesize historical topics. In 1961, historians Richard Hofstadter and C. Vann Woodward began co-editing the Oxford History of the United States. Their goal for the series was to produce a line of academically credible books that non-academic audiences would also find readable, and The Baltimore Sun anticipated the series would be affordable for "the family budget". Hofstadter died in 1970, before the series published any books. The press publicly announced in 1970 that the Oxford History of the United States series was forthcoming and that a series volume about the New Deal would be written by historian Ernest R. May.

By 1982, when the series published its first volume—The Glorious Cause: The American Revolution, 1763–1789—and issued another list of projected titles with their authors, historian David M. Kennedy had replaced May. At the time, Kennedy was a professor of history at Stanford University and had authored the 1980 Over Here: The First World War and American Society. Kennedy's own parents had lived through the Great Depression. Growing up, his family had attributed the Depression to United States president Herbert Hoover, calling it the "Hoover Depression".

In an interview, Kennedy explained that in writing Freedom from Fear he focused on synthesizing existing scholarship and did not travel to archives for research. Chapter manuscripts for Kennedy's volume met Woodward's resounding approval, though in July 1998 he advised Kennedy to shorten certain portions of the nearly 1,000-page manuscript.

== Publication ==
Oxford University Press published Freedom from Fear as part of the Oxford History of the United States in May 1999. The book is 954 pages long, and it weighs approximately six pounds. There are 24 maps of battles, 48 halftone images, a bibliographic essay, and a 59-page index. On release, Freedom from Fear sold for $39.95 (USD, equivalent to $77 in 2025) (Note: The Library Journal and Commentary reported that Freedom from Fear sold for $45 (USD, equivalent to $87 in 2025).) or £30 (GBP, equivalent to $57 in 2025). In 2001, Oxford University Press published a one-volume paperback edition that is 992 pages long and upon release sold for $22.50 (USD, equivalent to $41 in 2025).

== Content ==
Book outline by chapters
| Chapters | Topic |
|---|---|
| 1–3 | Presidency of Herbert Hoover |
| 4–7 | Early presidency of Franklin D. Roosevelt |
| 8–12 | New Deal between 1935 and 1938 |
| 13–15 | Foreign relations of the United States until 1941 |
| 16–22 | Military history of the United States during World War II |

Freedom from Fear is a narrative history of the United States during the Great Depression and World War II. It opens on a vignette of Adolf Hitler as a lance corporal at the end of World War I and ends by narrating a nuclear weapons test in the Soviet Union and Maoism's ascent to political power in China. The book is split across two halves: the first 400 pages cover the Great Depression in the United States and the New Deal, (Note: The coverage of specifically the New Deal encompasses approximately one third of the total book.) from 1929 to 1939, and the second half covers United States history during World War II across about 500 pages. In historian Mark Leff's words, Freedom from Fear is "essentially ... two books, each of which would require almost no revision to stand alone". The book mostly focuses on high politics, statecraft, military history, and diplomacy. There is one chapter about race and one chapter about labor history. Freedom from Fear contains little content about social history, cultural history, or the history of religion.

In Freedom from Fear, the Wall Street crash of 1929 marked the Great Depression's beginning but did not cause it, as according to Kennedy international economic conditions were more responsible for the economic depression. Kennedy's depiction of United States president Herbert Hoover's handling of the early depression is sympathetic. Freedom from Fear casts his belief that the American economy would recover without intervention as plausible given available information at the time and emphasizing the interventions of the Reconstruction Finance Corporation and Federal Farm Board during his presidency. In Kennedy's portrayal, Hoover's policies foreshadowed those of subsequent president Franklin D. Roosevelt but were insufficient to alleviate the Great Depression's humanitarian crisis. (Note: The trope in historical scholarship of Hoover and Roosevelt initially having similar responses to the Great Depression originates, according to historian Eric Rauchway, from the memoir of Marriner S. Eccles, chair of the Federal Reserve under Roosevelt (which Freedom from Fear quotes) but is not accurate to the historical record, as Hoover opposed Roosevelt's promised New Deal for the remainder of his presidency and throughout his life after the presidency; in Hoover's own words, he believed the New Deal "would destroy the very foundations of the American system".)

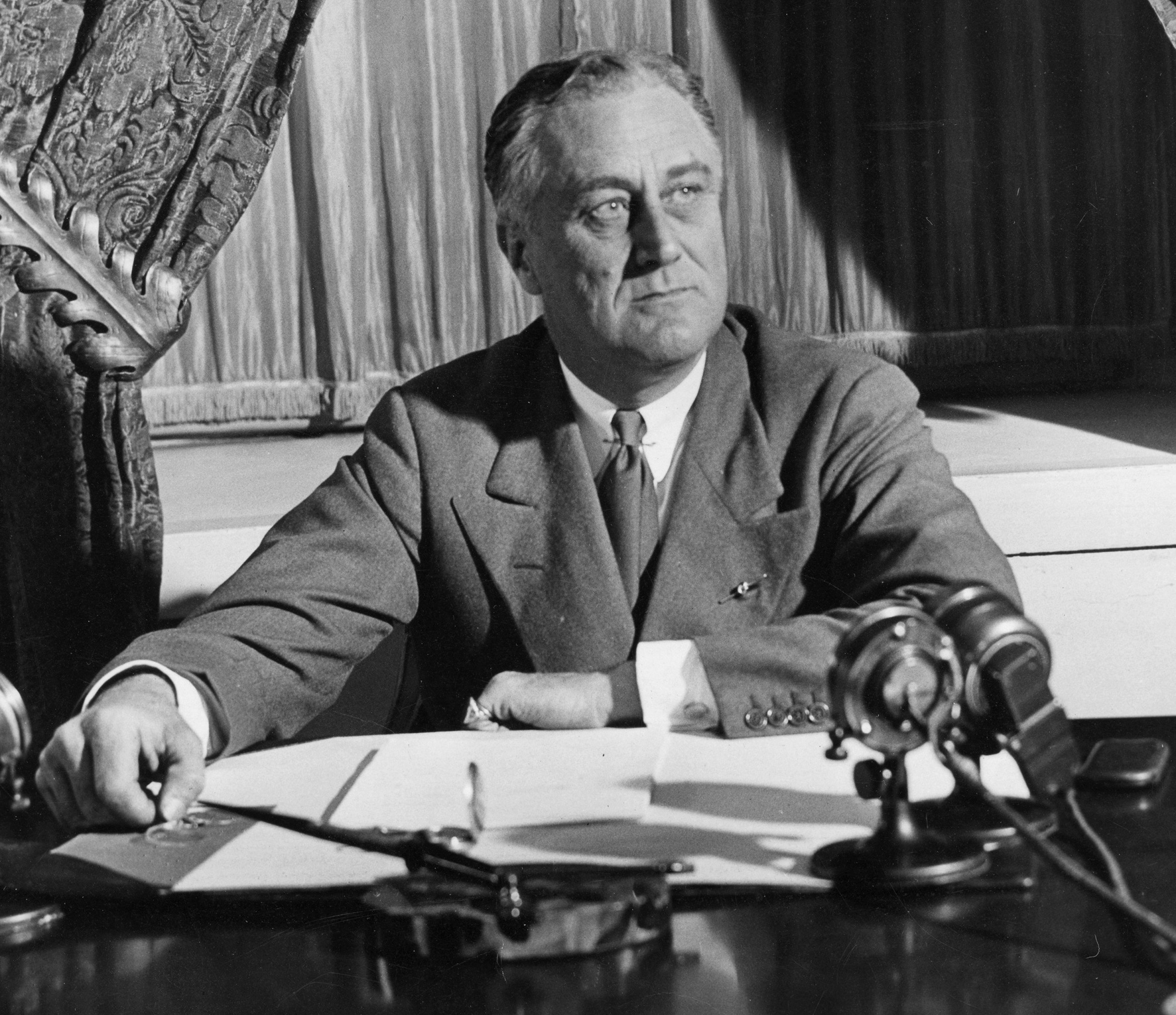
Freedom from Fear emphasizes Roosevelt's leadership.

Roosevelt himself predominates as the lead figure and protagonist of Freedom from Fear. In the book, Roosevelt appears as an active president meaningfully responsible for pulling the United States out of the Depression. Kennedy depicts Roosevelt as having laid the foundations of modern liberalism in the United States and having been "a truly brilliant politician with the skills to inspire, manipulate, and bend people", Booklist summarizes. Freedom from Fear is more ambiguous in its depiction of Roosevelt's establishment of the New Deal. Kennedy claims the concept of the New Deal was unclear to voters in 1932 and that Roosevelt's approach as president was initially improvisational, producing a "ramshackle, hastily assembled" array of programs, in Kennedy's words, that did not stabilize until 1935. (Note: This depiction of the New Deal has since been contested. According to historian Eric Rauchway in the journal Modern American History, believing Roosevelt did not have a clear plan for the New Deal and that voters did not understand it before he was elected is an "academic urban legend" circulated in some secondary sources, as Franklin D. Roosevelt in fact "ran on the New Deal and was elected on it", as he had "a plan of action for the New Deal" and "made its components abundantly clear to the public".)

Freedom from Fear's latter half focuses on international relations, including the context for and prosecution of World War II. It portrays both the Pacific War and the European theatre of World War II as well as home front events like industrial mobilization, women entering the workforce, and racism. According to Freedom from Fear, the American war experience was relatively prosperous compared to most other countries participating in World War II, as military Keynesianism—high federal spending on military industrialization—ended the Great Depression. Kennedy uses the Manhattan Project as an example of this that highlights how "uniquely privileged" the United States was as the only belligerent with "the margins of money, material, and manpower, as well as the undisturbed space and time" necessary to create nuclear weapons.

== Reception ==
=== Storytelling ===
Freedom from Fear received acclaim upon its release. According to historian William Rubinstein, the book is "a highly successful, vivid, and fair narrative account". Journalist Rick Perlstein praised its "colorful details and the clanking, large-geared narrative engine" and argued that one "could even call it beach reading". The Los Angeles Times averred that "[e]ven those who thought they knew it all, or who indeed lived through all or most of those years, will find illuminating information and insights on almost every page" of Freedom from Fear. The New York Times Book Review declared it "the best one-volume account of the Roosevelt era currently available". Historian Thomas Blantz considered it a "book for all readers", arguing lay audiences would appreciate the "absorbing story". The Library Journal complimented Kennedy for "[d]isplaying a literary craft uncommon in survey works" like Freedom from Fear. According to The Boston Globe, in Freedom from Fear Kennedy "makes [the history] his story in a way no one has ever before".

=== Coverage ===
Historian Blantz believed that scholars would "find [Freedom from Fear] a balanced review" of research on the era, writing that "the impact of Depression and war in the daily lives of Americans—farmers, soldiers, women, industrial workers, Nisei, Black Americans, the unemployed—is thoroughly portrayed". According to Foreign Affairs, the book "had breadth and depth, fully comprehended political, military, economic, and social developments, and integrated a wealth of specialized scholarship". Publishers Weekly's book review called Freedom from Fear "the definitive history of the most important decades of the American century", and Booklist considered it "comprehensive".

There were reviewers who criticized the selectiveness of Freedom from Fear's coverage. The Journal of American History called the subtitle, The American People, a "curious choice" because "the 'American people' appear with conspicuous infrequency", as Freedom from Fear has "a traditional cast" and although Kennedy includes women and Americans of diverse ethnic background, he does not analyze gender or ethnicity as such. Writing for The New Leader, historian David Oshinsky wrote that "ordinary Americans ... too often appear as passive victims of injustice, poverty and pain", leaving the impression that social change happened only because of leaders, without the input of the public. According to historian Harvard Sitkoff, "women are all but invisible" in the book, with only twenty women named in the entire index. The New York Times Book Review reported that although Kennedy does "consider minorities and women" in the book, they are "decidedly secondary" and "[d]ead white males predominate". Oshinsky criticized the book's inattention to popular culture, and the Book Review stated that "American culture, particularly popular culture, is all but ignored".

Reviewers noted Freedom from Fear's coverage of the military history of the United States during World War II. Parameters called the coverage of the war a "comprehensive treatment" that "artfully weaves battlefront and homefront". Historian Kevin Boyle wrote Freedom from Fear covered wartime diplomacy and battles with "compelling detail". According to historian Justus Drew Doenecke, Kennedy "is at his best describing the battles of World War II, conveying an immediacy seldom found in combat accounts".

Blantz complimented Freedom from Fear's depiction of the United States home front during World War II. Boyle called Freedom from Fear "a forceful reminder that for the millions of Americans who suffered through a generation of depression and war, the costs of the postwar era were well worth bearing". Doenecke averred the book "could do more" to analyze Roosevelt's "incredibly poor" domestic administration during the war, such as presiding over the incarceration of Japanese Americans and barring the United States to refugees from Nazi Germany.

=== Honors ===
Freedom from Fear received four book prizes in 2000. These were the Pulitzer Prize for History, the Francis Parkman Prize, the Ambassador Book Award, and the Commonwealth Club of California's gold medal. In a 2022 interview with Five Books, Franklin Delano Roosevelt Foundation historical programming director Cynthia Koch included Freedom from Fear in a list of what she considered the five "best books on Franklin D. Roosevelt".

== Editions ==
- Kennedy, David M. (1999). Freedom from Fear: The American People in Depression and War, 1929–1945 (1st ed.). Oxford University Press. ISBN 978-0195038347.
- — (2001). Freedom from Fear: The American People in Depression and War, 1929–1945 (paperback ed.). Oxford University Press. ISBN 978-0195038347.
- — (2003). The American People in the Great Depression: Freedom from Fear, Part One (paperback ed.). Oxford University Press. ISBN 978-0195168921.
- — (2003). The American People in World War II: Freedom from Fear, Part Two (paperback ed.). Oxford University Press. ISBN 978-0195168938.
- — (2010). Freedom from Fear: The American People in Depression and War, 1929–1945. Narrated by Tom Weiner (audiobook ed.). Blackstone Audio.

== Bibliography ==
=== Books ===
- Cobb, James C. (2022). C. Vann Woodward: America's Historian. University of North Carolina Press. ISBN 978-1469670218.
- Katznelson, Ira (2013). Fear Itself: The New Deal and the Origins of Our Time. Liveright Publishing Corporation. ISBN 978-0871404503.
- Kennedy, David M. (1999). Freedom from Fear: The American People in Depression and War, 1929–1945. Oxford History of the United States. Oxford University Press. ISBN 978-0195038347.

=== Journals ===
- Blumberg, Barbara (Fall 2000). "The Oxford History of the United States. Volume IX, Freedom from Fear: The American People in Depression and War, 1929–1945. By David M. Kennedy". The Historian. 63 (1): 155–156. JSTOR 24450878.
- Boyle, Kevin (February 2000). "Freedom from Fear: The American People in Depression and War, 1929–1945, David M. Kennedy". Labor History. 41 (1): 108–109. ISSN 0023-656X.
- Burnard, Trevor (August 2011). "America the Good, America the Brave, America the Free: Reviewing the Oxford History of the United States". Journal of American Studies. 45 (3): 407–420. doi:10.1017/S0021875811000508. hdl:11343/33008. JSTOR 23016778.
- Cate, Alan (Spring 2000). "Freedom From Fear: The American People in Depression and War, 1929–1945. By David M. Kennedy". Book Reviews. Parameters. 30 (1). doi:10.55540/0031-1723.1965.
- Davies, Gareth (June 2000). "Freedom from Fear: The American People in Depression and War, 1929–1945. By David M. Kennedy". The Historical Journal. 43 (2): 598–600. JSTOR 3021046.
- Ellis, Mark (October 2001). "Freedom from Fear: The American People in Depression and War, 1929–1945. By David M. Kennedy". History: The Journal of the Historical Association. 86 (284): 553–554. JSTOR 24425566.
- Lang, Clarence (Autumn 2000). "Freedom from Fear: The American People in Depression and War, 1929–1945 by David M. Kennedy". Political Science Quarterly. 115 (3): 449–451. doi:10.2307/2658129. JSTOR 2658129.
- Leff, Mark (September 2000). "Freedom from Fear: The American People in Depression and War, 1929–1945. By David M. Kennedy". The Journal of American History. 87 (2): 723. doi:10.2307/2568880. JSTOR 2568880.
- Nardini, Robert F. (15 March 1999). "Kennedy, David M. Freedom from Fear: The American People in Depression and War, 1929–1945". Library Journal. 124 (5): 94.
- Rauchway, Eric (July 2019). "The New Deal Was on the Ballot in 1932". Modern American History. 2 (02): 201–213. doi:10.1017/mah.2018.42.
- Sitkoff, Harvard (September 2000). "Freedom from Fear: The American People in Depression and War, 1929–1945. By David M. Kennedy". The American Historical Review. 105 (3): 954–955. doi:10.2307/2651898. JSTOR 2651898.
- Story, Ronald (March 2000). "The Great Transformation". Reviews in American History. 28 (1): 87–95. doi:10.1353/rah.2000.0016. JSTOR 30031131.
- Van Heyningen, E. B. (1986). "The Glorious Cause: The American Revolution, 1763–1789. By R. Middlekauff". Boekbesprekings/Book Reviews. South African Historical Journal. 18: 298–300. doi:10.1080/02582478608671616.

=== Magazines ===
- Doenecke, Justus D. (November–December 2004). "Hoover to Hiroshima: So You Think American History from the Great Depression Through World War II Holds No Surprises? Read on". Books & Culture. Vol. 10, no. 6. pp. 24–26.
- "Freedom from Fear: The American People in Depression and War". Kirkus Reviews. 15 April 1999.
- "Freedom from Fear: The American People in Depression and War, 1929–1945". Publishers Weekly. Vol. 246, no. 14. 5 April 1999. p. 227 – via Gale.
- Freeman, Jay (15 March 1999). "Kennedy, David M. Freedom from Fear: The American People in Depression and War, 1929–1945". Booklist. Vol. 95, no. 14. p. 1286 – via Gale.
- Gewen, Barry (23 May 1999). "Do Something—Anything!". The New York Times Book Review. pp. 16–17. ProQuest 217294251.
- Oshinsky, David M. (14–28 June 1999). "History from the Top Down". The New Leader. Vol. 82, no. 7. pp. 5–6. ISSN 0028-6044.
- Perlstein, Rick (24 May 1999). "David Kennedy: The National Experience". Publishers Weekly. Vol. 245, no. 21. p. 50.
- Rubinstein, William D. (September 2000). "Untitled review of Freedom from Fear: The American People in Depression and War, 1929–1945 and America Divided: The Civil War of the Sixties". History Today. Vol. 50, no. 9. p. 60. ISSN 0018-2753.
- Valiunas, Algis (April 1999). "Hard Times". Commentary. Vol. 107, no. 4. pp. 51–53. ISSN 0010-2601.
- Zelikow, Philip (November–December 1999). "Freedom from Fear: The American People in Depression and War, 1929–1945. By David M. Kennedy". Foreign Affairs. Vol. 78, no. 6. p. 149. doi:10.2307/20049569. JSTOR 20049569.

=== Newspapers ===
- Day, Anthony (30 April 2000). "The Trial of the Century". Los Angeles Times. p. BR10. ProQuest 421496263.
- Freehling, William (6 June 1982). "'Flawed but Auspicious' Start to New U. S. History". Books. The Baltimore Sun. p. D5.
- Kennedy, David M. (11 February 2001). "Big-picture History Author David M. Kennedy Talks About Writing Freedom from Fear". Chicago Tribune (Interview). Interviewed by Elizabeth Taylor. p. 14.3.
- Nenneman, Richard A. (27 May 1999). "Becoming a Superpower". The Christian Science Monitor. p. 16 – via Gale.
- Shribman, David M. (2 May 1999). "A Prostrate Nation Becomes a World Power". The Boston Globe. p. M3.
- Weeks, Linton (11 April 2000). "For Lahiri, First Time A Charm at Pulitzers; Young Novelist Among Winners in the Arts". The Washington Post. p. C1. ProQuest 408588334.

=== Online ===
- Blantz, Thomas E. (June 1999). "Blantz on Kennedy, Freedom from Fear: The American People in Depression and War, 1929–1945". H-Pol. H-Net. Archived from the original on 11 April 2024.
- "David M. Kennedy". Gale Literature: Contemporary Authors. 24 October 2014.
- Koch, Cynthia (8 October 2022). "The Best Books on Franklin D. Roosevelt". Five Books (Interview). Interviewed by Eve Gerber. p. 14.3.
