= A History of America in Ten Strikes =

2018 book by Erik Loomis

- Author: Erik Loomis
- Language: English
- Genre: Non-fiction
- Publisher: The New Press
- Publication date: October 2, 2018
- Publication place: United States
- Pages: 288
- ISBN: 9781620971611

A History of America in Ten Strikes is a non-fiction book by American author and professor Erik Loomis, first published by The New Press in 2018. It examines the history of the United States through labor conflicts, while arguing that internal discrimination and government opposition have held the American working class back. It received generally positive reviews as an introductory text, although the strength of its arguments and depth of strike coverage were questioned.

== Contents ==
The book is framed through the examination of ten strikes (chapter titles listed).

1. Lowell Mill Girls and the Development of American Capitalism
2. Slaves on Strike
3. The Eight-Hour Day Strikes
4. The Anthracite Strike and the Progressive State
5. The Bread and Roses Strike
6. The Flint Sit-Down Strike and the New Deal
7. The Oakland General Strike and the Cold War
8. Lordstown Workers in a Rebellious Age
9. Air Traffic Controllers and the New Assault on Unions
10. Justice for Janitors and Immigrant Unionism

Not all chapters deal with an event that is strictly described as a strike; "Slaves on Strike" covers general efforts by slaves that reduced their labor output, not any one specific event. There is also an appendix that briefly lists 150 important moments in American labor history.

Alongside the individual strikes covered, Loomis covers how the power of organized labor has increased and decreased over time, along with how factors such as race and gender discrimination have affected unionization efforts. One of his largest arguments in the book is that the source of the weakness of American labor is racism within the American working class. The other is that, due to the effectiveness of the government in stopping strikes, support from sympathetic government employees (and campaigns to get them elected) are the most effective way to secure worker's rights.

== Publication history ==
A History of America in Ten Strikes was first published by The New Press on October 2, 2018. It was Erik Loomis's third book, following Out of Sight and Empire of Timber.

== Reception ==
A History of America in Ten Strikes received generally positive reviews, primarily from a labor advocacy angle. In a starred review from Kirkus Reviews, it was praised for the storytelling present in "this primer/well-documented advocacy tract". Publishers Weekly criticized it for leaning too heavily into Loomis's pro-union views and failing to provide convincing arguments for those who did not already agree with him, while being popular with those who do. Writing for Library Journal, Charles Piehl felt that the narrative was paced unevenly and that a cohesive argument throughout the text was lacking, and that the ending was weak due to being a plea for increased activism rather than finalizing a conclusion.

James Gregory of Labor praised the writing quality and fast-paced narrative backing the book, but felt that the book's depth suffered for it, with only a few pages allotted to the strike confrontation in each chapter. Comparing it to Jeremy Brecher's 1972 book Strike!, he noted the former included much more analysis of strikes and the roles they served in labor relations, while the latter was good as "a quick and passionate introduction" to the labor history it covers. The New Republic's David Sessions wrote that Loomis effectively showed that the goal of the labor movement is to increase the strength of American democracy more than just pay rates.
