= Daniel Walker Howe =

American historian (1937–2025)

Daniel Gething Walker Howe (January 10, 1937 – December 25, 2025) was an American historian who specialized in the early national period of U.S. history, with a particular interest in its intellectual and religious dimensions.

He was Rhodes Professor of American History at Oxford University in England (from 1992 to 2002 then Emeritus) and Professor of History Emeritus at the University of California, Los Angeles. He won the 2008 Pulitzer Prize for History for What Hath God Wrought (2007). He was president of the Society for Historians of the Early American Republic in 2001, and was a Fellow of both the American Academy of Arts and Sciences and the Royal Historical Society.

== Early life and education ==
Howe was born in Ogden, Utah, on January 10, 1937. He graduated from East High School in Denver. He received his Bachelor of Arts at Harvard University in 1959, magna cum laude in American history and literature, and his Ph.D. in history at University of California, Berkeley, in 1966. Howe's connection with Oxford University began when he matriculated at Magdalen College to read modern history in 1960, receiving his M.A. in 1965.

== Career ==
Howe taught at Yale University from 1966 to 1973), UCLA from 1973 to 1992, where he chaired the history department, and Oxford University from 1992 to 2002. In 2011 he spent a semester as a visiting professor at Wofford College in Spartanburg, South Carolina.

In 1989–1990 Howe was Harold Vyvyan Harmsworth Professor of American History at Oxford and a fellow of The Queen's College, Oxford. In 1992 he became a permanent member of the Oxford history faculty and a fellow of St Catherine's College, Oxford until his retirement in 2002. Brasenose College, Oxford elected him an Honorary Member of its Senior Common Room.

== Personal life and death ==
Howe married Sandra Shumway; they had three children. He died at his home in Sherman Oaks, California, on December 25, 2025, at the age of 88.

== Awards and honors ==
Howe received an honorary Doctor of Humanities degree from Weber State University in 2014.

== Books ==
- The Unitarian Conscience: Harvard Moral Philosophy, 1805-1861. Cambridge Mass: Cambridge, Mass. : Harvard University Press. 1970. ISBN 978-0-674-92121-4.
- Blodgett, Geoffrey (1976). Daniel Walker Howe (ed.). Victorian America. Philadelphia: University of Pennsylvania Press. ISBN 978-0-8122-7713-5.
- The Political Culture of the American Whigs. Chicago: University of Chicago Press. 1979. ISBN 978-0-226-35479-8.
- Making the American Self. Cambridge, Mass. London: Harvard Univ. Press. 1997. ISBN 978-0-674-16555-7.
- What Hath God Wrought: The Transformation of America, 1815–1848 (Oxford University Press, 2007), volume 5 of the Oxford History of the United States
