= Eric McKitrick =

American historian (1919–2002)

- Born: Eric Louis McKitrick; July 5, 1919; Battle Creek, Michigan, U.S.
- Died: April 24, 2002 (aged 82); New York City, U.S.
- Education: Columbia University (BA, MA, PhD)
- Occupation: Historian
- Awards: John H. Dunning Prize (1960); Bancroft Prize (1994)

Eric Louis McKitrick (July 5, 1919 – April 24, 2002) was an American historian, best known for The Age of Federalism: The Early American Republic, 1788–1800 (1993) with Stanley Elkins, which won the Bancroft Prize in 1994.

== Life ==
McKitrick was born in Battle Creek, Michigan. He graduated from Columbia University with a B.A. in 1949, an M.A. in 1951, and a Ph.D. in 1959. He taught at the University of Chicago and at Rutgers University's Douglass College in the 1950s, and Columbia University from 1960 to 1989 before retiring as an emeritus professor of history. In 1973–74 he was the Pitt Professor of American History and Institutions at Cambridge University and in 1979–80 the Harold Vyvyan Harmsworth Professor of American History at Oxford University.

McKitrick reviewed for The New York Review of Books.

He died in New York City, aged 82.

== Awards ==
- 1960 Dunning Prize
- 1970 Guggenheim Fellowship
- 1994 Bancroft Prize

== Works ==
- Eric L. McKitrick (1960). Andrew Johnson and Reconstruction. Oxford University Press. ISBN 978-0-19-505707-2. (reprinted 1988)
- Eric L. McKitrick, ed. (1963). Slavery Defended: The Views of the Old South. Prentice-Hall. ISBN 0-13-812800-6.
- Eric L. McKitrick, ed. (1969). Andrew Johnson; A Profile. Hill and Wang. ISBN 978-0-8090-6160-0.
- Stanley M. Elkins & Eric L. McKitrick (1993). The Age of Federalism: The Early American Republic, 1788-1800. Oxford University Press. ISBN 978-0-19-509381-0.
