= Willie Lee Rose =

American historian (1927–2018)

- Born: May 18, 1927; Moneta, Virginia, U.S.
- Died: June 20, 2018 (aged 91); Baltimore, Maryland, U.S.
- Education: University of Mary Washington; Johns Hopkins University
- Occupation: Historian
- Spouse: William G. Rose

Willie Lee Rose (May 18, 1927 – June 20, 2018) was an American historian. She was a professor of American History at Johns Hopkins University, and the author of several books about slavery and the Reconstruction Era.

== Early life ==
Rose was born as Willie Lee Nichols on May 18, 1927, in Moneta, Virginia. She grew up in Bedford, Virginia.

Rose graduated from University of Mary Washington, where she earned a bachelor's degree in 1947. She earned a PhD in history from Johns Hopkins University in 1962.

== Career ==
Rose was a history professor at the University of Virginia until 1973, when she returned to Johns Hopkins University as faculty. She was a history professor at Johns Hopkins until 1992. She was the Harold Vyvyan Harmsworth Visiting professor of American History at the University of Oxford in 1977.

Rose authored several books about slavery and the Reconstruction Era. She won the Allan Nevins Prize and the Francis Parkman Prize from the Society of American Historians and the Troyer Steele Anderson Prize from the American Historical Association in 1991.

== Personal life and death ==
Rose married William G. Rose in 1949. He predeceased her in 1985.

Rose died on June 20, 2018, in Baltimore, Maryland, at 91.

== Selected works ==
- Rose, Willie Rose; Woodward, C. Vann (1976). Rehearsal for Reconstruction: The Port Royal Experiment. Oxford, U.K.: Oxford University Press. ISBN 9780195198829. OCLC 1038448111.
- Rose, Willie Lee (1982). Slavery and Freedom. New York: Oxford University Press. ISBN 9780195029697. OCLC 966044365.
- Rose, Willie Lee (1999). A Documentary History of Slavery in North America. Athens, Georgia: University of Georgia Press. ISBN 9780820320656. OCLC 492259031.
