= David M. Kennedy (historian) =

American historian

David Kennedy
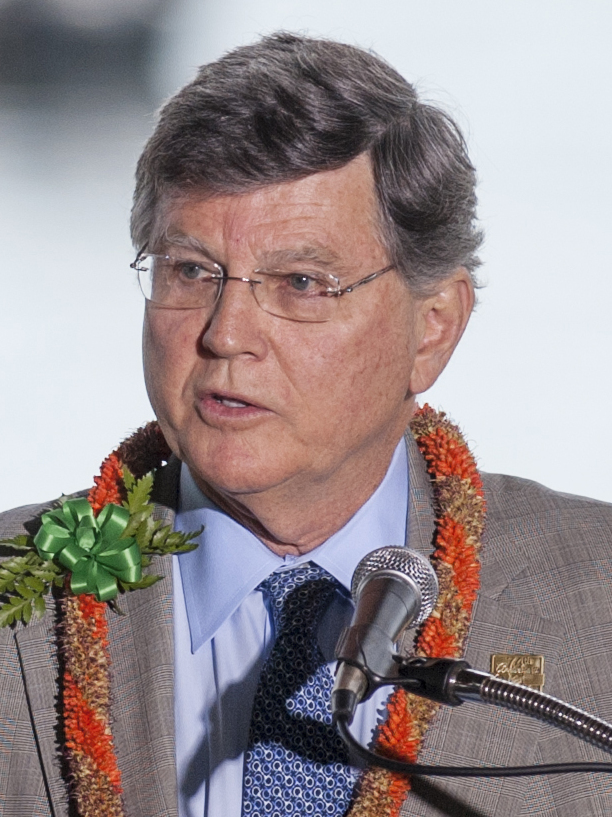
- Kennedy in 2015
- Born: David Michael Kennedy; July 22, 1941 (age 85); Seattle, Washington, U.S.
- Spouse: Judith Osborne (m. 1970; died 2023)
- Children: 3
- Awards: Pulitzer Prize (2000)

Academic background
- Education: Stanford University (BA); Yale University (MA, PhD)
- Thesis: Birth Control (1968)

Academic work
- Discipline: History
- Sub-discipline: American history
- Institutions: Stanford University
- Doctoral students: Elizabeth Borgwardt; Elizabeth Cobbs; John McGreevy
- Notable students: Josh Hawley
- Notable works: Freedom from Fear (1999)

David Michael Kennedy (born July 22, 1941) is an American historian specializing in American history. He is the Donald J. McLachlan Professor of History Emeritus at Stanford University and the former director of the Bill Lane Center for the American West. Kennedy's scholarship is notable for its integration of economic analysis and cultural analysis with social history and political history.

Kennedy is responsible for the recent editions of the popular history textbook, The American Pageant. He is also the current editor (since 1999) of the Oxford History of the United States series. This position was held previously by C. Vann Woodward. Earlier in his career, Kennedy won the Bancroft Prize for his first book Birth Control in America: The Career of Margaret Sanger (1970), and was a finalist for the Pulitzer Prize for his book World War I, Over Here: The First World War and American Society (1980). He was the Harold Vyvyan Harmsworth Professor of American History from 1995 to 1996. He won the 2000 Pulitzer Prize for History for Freedom from Fear: The American People in Depression and War, 1929–1945 (1999).

== Biography ==
Born on July 22, 1941, in Seattle, Washington, Kennedy received his Bachelor of Arts degree in history from Stanford University and his Master of Arts and Doctor of Philosophy degrees in American studies from Yale University. He is a fellow of the American Academy of Arts and Sciences.

Kennedy married Judith (Judy) Ann Osborne in 1970, and they remained together until her death on June 5, 2023. They have three children.

== Books ==
External videos
- Presentation by Kennedy on Freedom from Fear, June 5, 1999, C-SPAN
- Booknotes interview with Kennedy on Freedom from Fear, June 20, 1999, C-SPAN

- Birth Control in America: The Career of Margaret Sanger (1970), ISBN 9780300012026
  - John Gilmary Shea Prize, 1970
  - Bancroft Prize, 1971
- Social Thought in America and Europe, co-editor with Paul A. Robinson (1970)
- Progressivism: The Critical Issues, editor (1971)
- The American People in the Depression (1973), ISBN 9780883010914
- The American People in the Age of Kennedy (West Haven: Pendulum Press, 1973), ISBN 9780883010921
- The American Pageant: A History of the Republic, co-author with Thomas A. Bailey and Lizabeth Cohen (1979; 14th ed. 2010), ISBN 9780547166544
- Over Here: The First World War and American Society (1980), ISBN 9780195027297
  - Pulitzer Prize Finalist, 1981
- The American Spirit: United States History as Seen by Contemporaries, co-editor with Thomas A. Bailey (1984), ISBN 9780669053814
- Power and Responsibility: Case Studies in American Leadership, co-editor with Michael Parrish (1986), ISBN 9780155707559
- Freedom From Fear: The American People in Depression and War, 1929–1945 (1999) (Vol. 9 in The Oxford History of the United States), ISBN 9781439569146

== Awards and honors ==
- Member of the American Academy of Arts and Sciences, 1996
- Pulitzer Prize, 2000
- Francis Parkman Prize, 2000
- Ambassador Book Award, 2000
- California Gold Medal for Literature, 2000
- Member of the American Philosophical Society, 2001

== See also ==
- Wayne S. Vucinich

Academic offices
Preceded by Robert Dallek	Harold Vyvyan Harmsworth; Professor of American History; 1995	Succeeded by Robert Middlekauff
Awards
Preceded by Dan T. Carter	Bancroft Prize; 1971; With: Erik Barnouw and Joseph Frazier Wall	Succeeded by Carl Neumann Degler
Preceded by Charles Coleman Sellers	Bancroft Prize; 1971; With: Erik Barnouw and Joseph Frazier Wall	Succeeded by Robert Middlekauff
Preceded by Gordon S. Wood	Bancroft Prize; 1971; With: Erik Barnouw and Joseph Frazier Wall	Succeeded by Samuel Eliot Morison
Preceded by Edward Ball	Ambassador Book Award for American Studies; 2000	Succeeded by Nathaniel Philbrick
Preceded by Edwin G. Burrows	Pulitzer Prize for History; 2000	Succeeded by Joseph Ellis
Preceded by Mike Wallace	Pulitzer Prize for History; 2000	Succeeded by Joseph Ellis
