= Narrative history =

Narrative history is the practice of writing history in a story-based form. It tends to entail history-writing based on reconstructing series of short-term events, and ever since the influential work of Leopold von Ranke on professionalising history-writing in the nineteenth century, it has been associated with empiricism. The term narrative history thus overlaps with the term histoire événementielle ('event-history') coined by Fernand Braudel in the early twentieth century, as he promoted forms of history-writing analysing much longer-term trends (what he called the longue durée).

Though history is considered a social science, the story-based nature of history allows for the inclusion of a greater or lesser degree of narration in addition to an analytical or interpretative exposition of historical knowledge. It can be divided into two subgenres: the traditional narrative and the modern narrative.

Traditional narrative focuses on the chronological order of history. It is event driven and tends to center upon individuals, action, and intention. For example, in regard to the French Revolution, a historian who works with the traditional narrative might be more interested in the revolution as a single entity (one revolution), centre it in Paris, and rely heavily upon major figures such as Maximilien Robespierre. Francis Parkman's style is traditional: "Parkman carries the reader on his full flood of narrative as easily as the Mississippi once bore the explorers of imperial France toward the mouth. Hence we may read his work almost as we read a novel."

Conversely, modern narrative typically focuses on structures and general trends. A modern narrative would break from rigid chronology if the historian felt it explained the concept better. In terms of the French Revolution, a historian working with the modern narrative might show general traits that were shared by revolutionaries across France but would also illustrate regional variations from those general trends (many confluent revolutions). Also this type of historian might use different sociological factors to show why different types of people supported the general revolution.

== See also ==
- Creative nonfiction
