= Treaty of Amity and Commerce (Prussia–United States) =

1785 treaty between the United States and Prussia

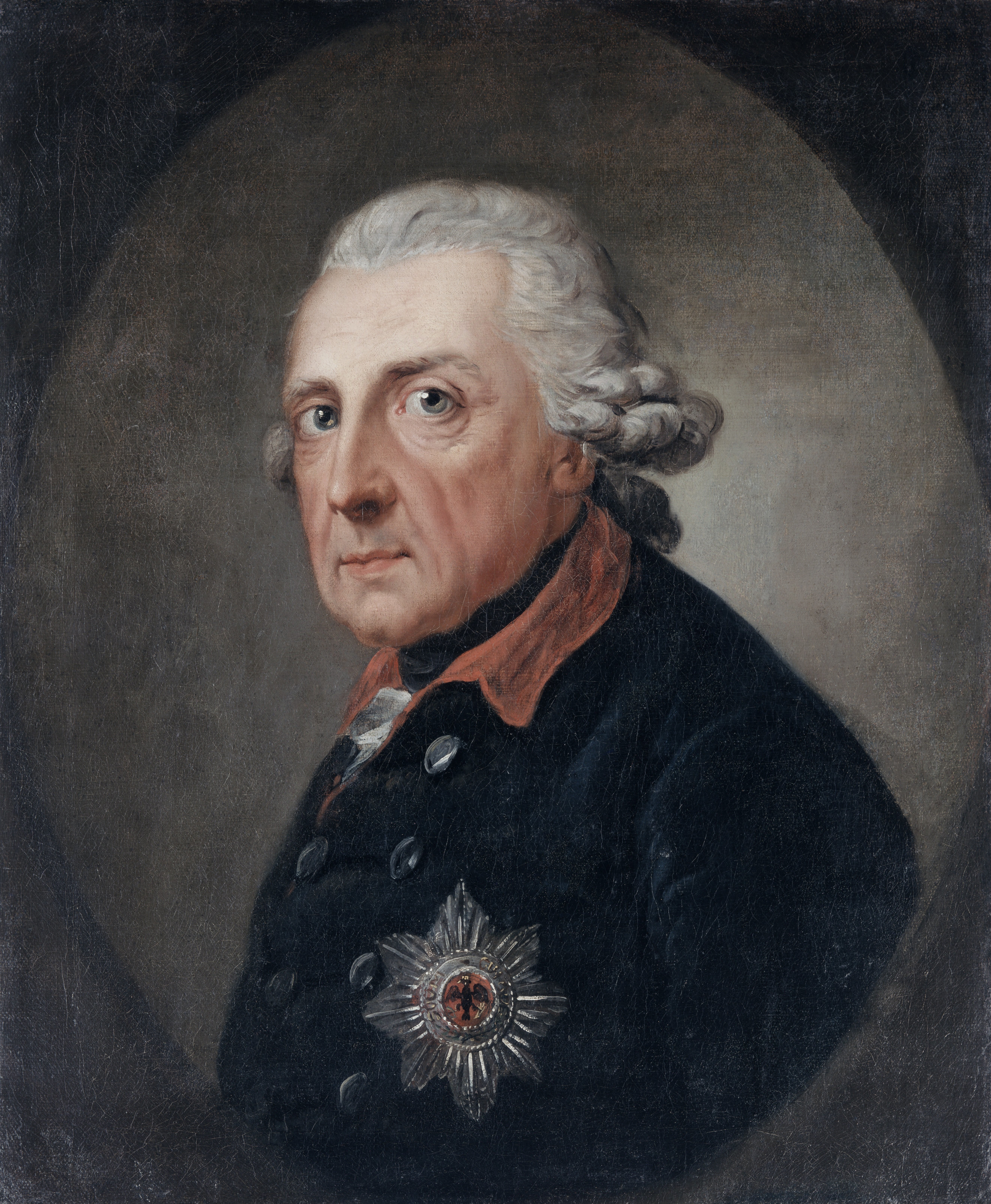
Frederick the Great

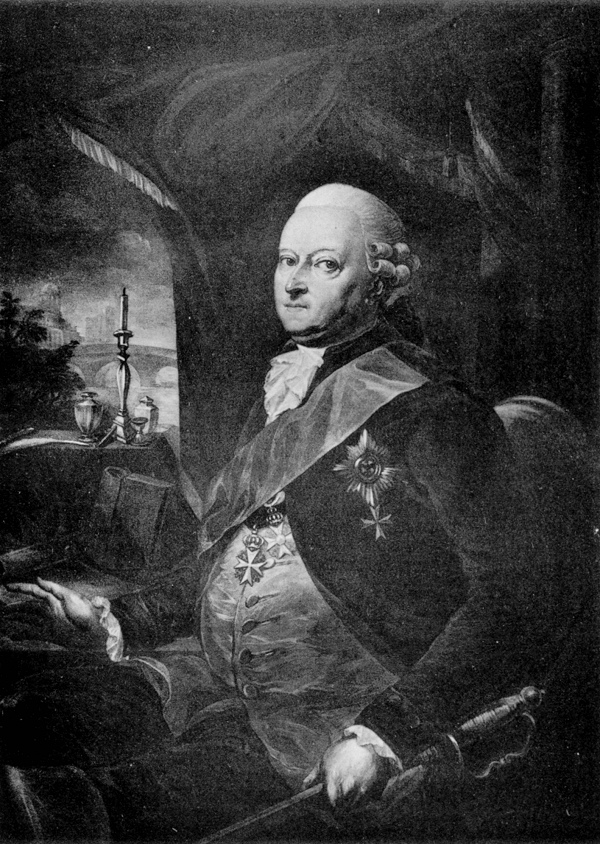
Reichsgraf und Graf Karl Wilhelm Finck von Finckenstein

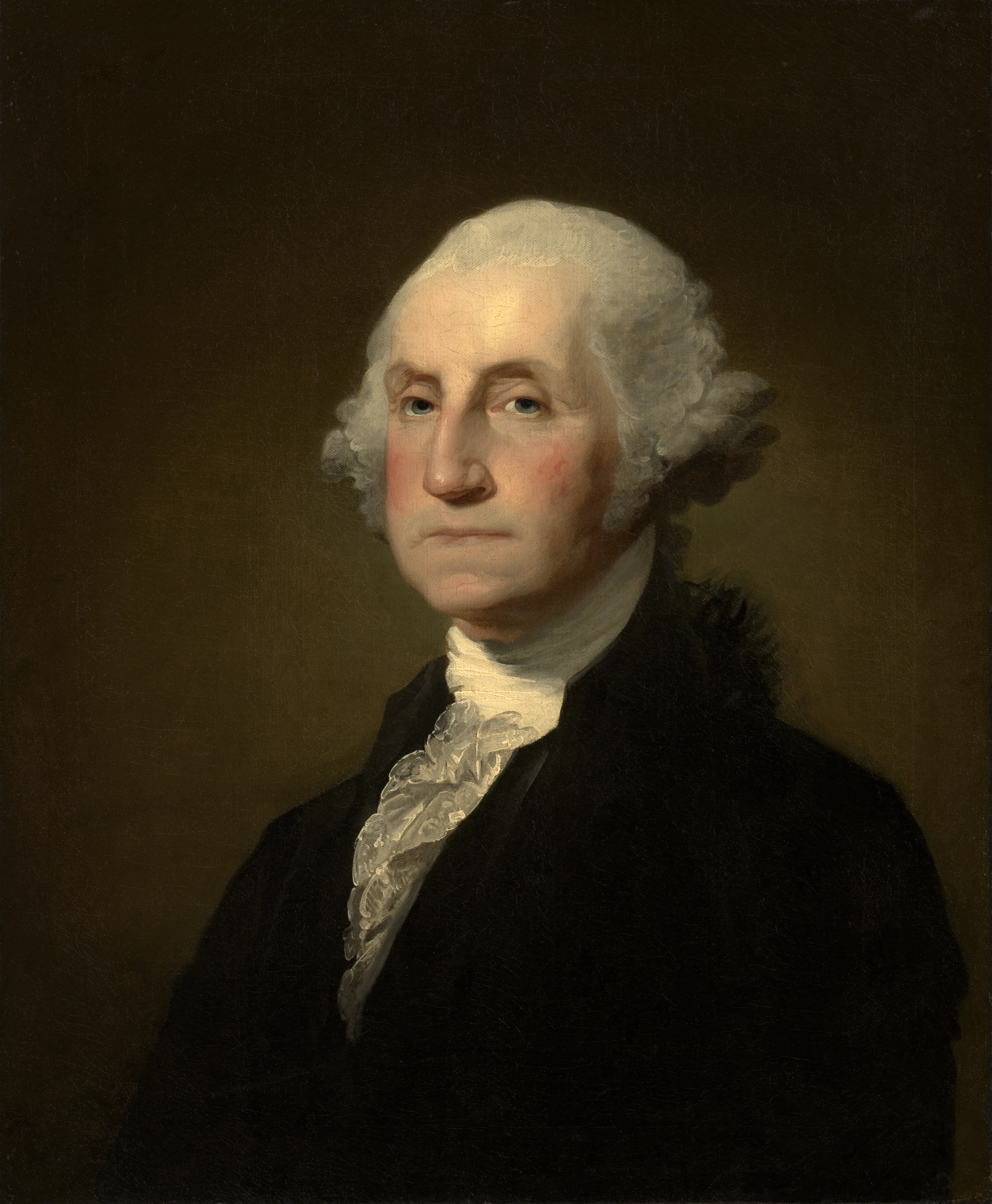
George Washington

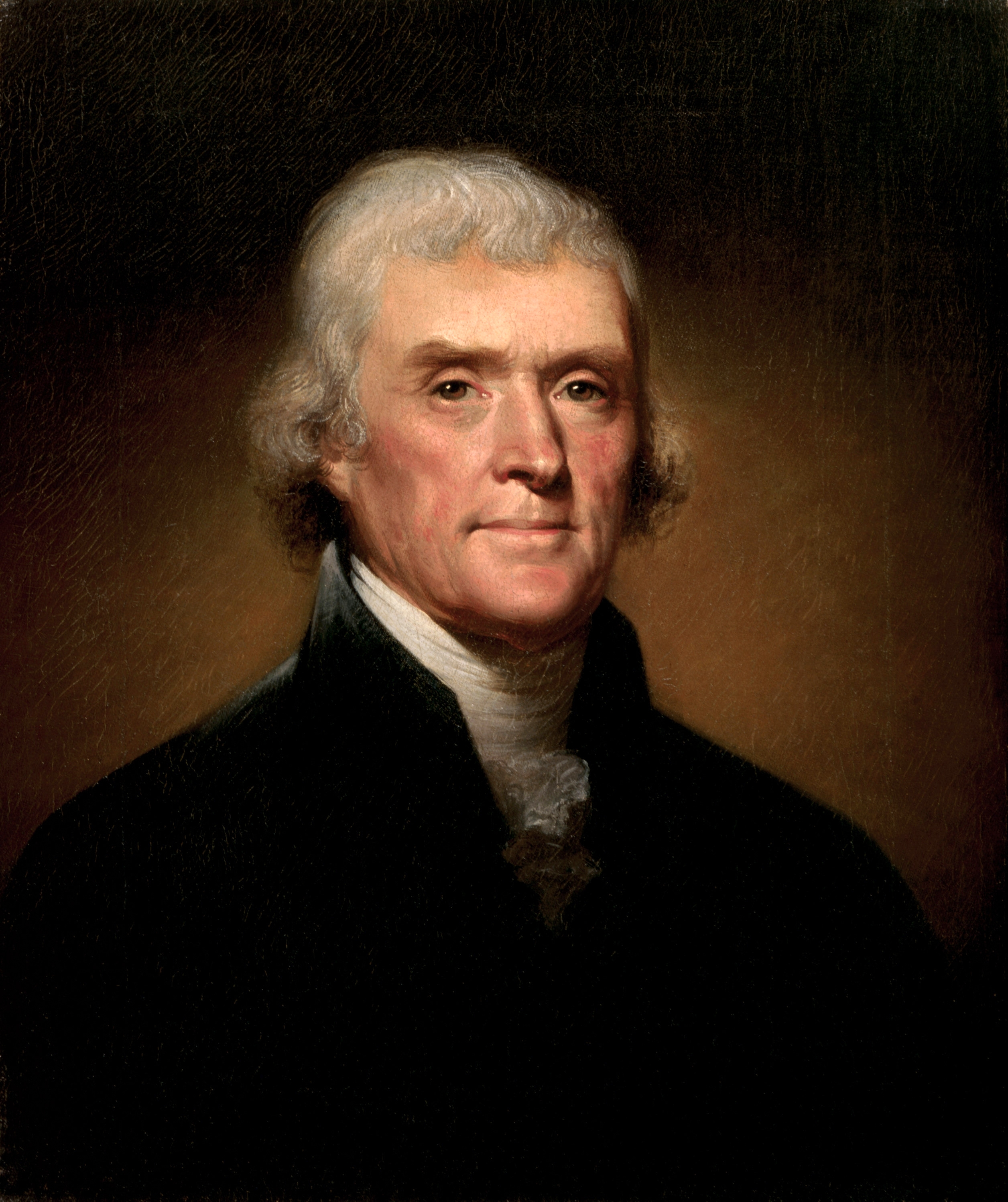
Thomas Jefferson

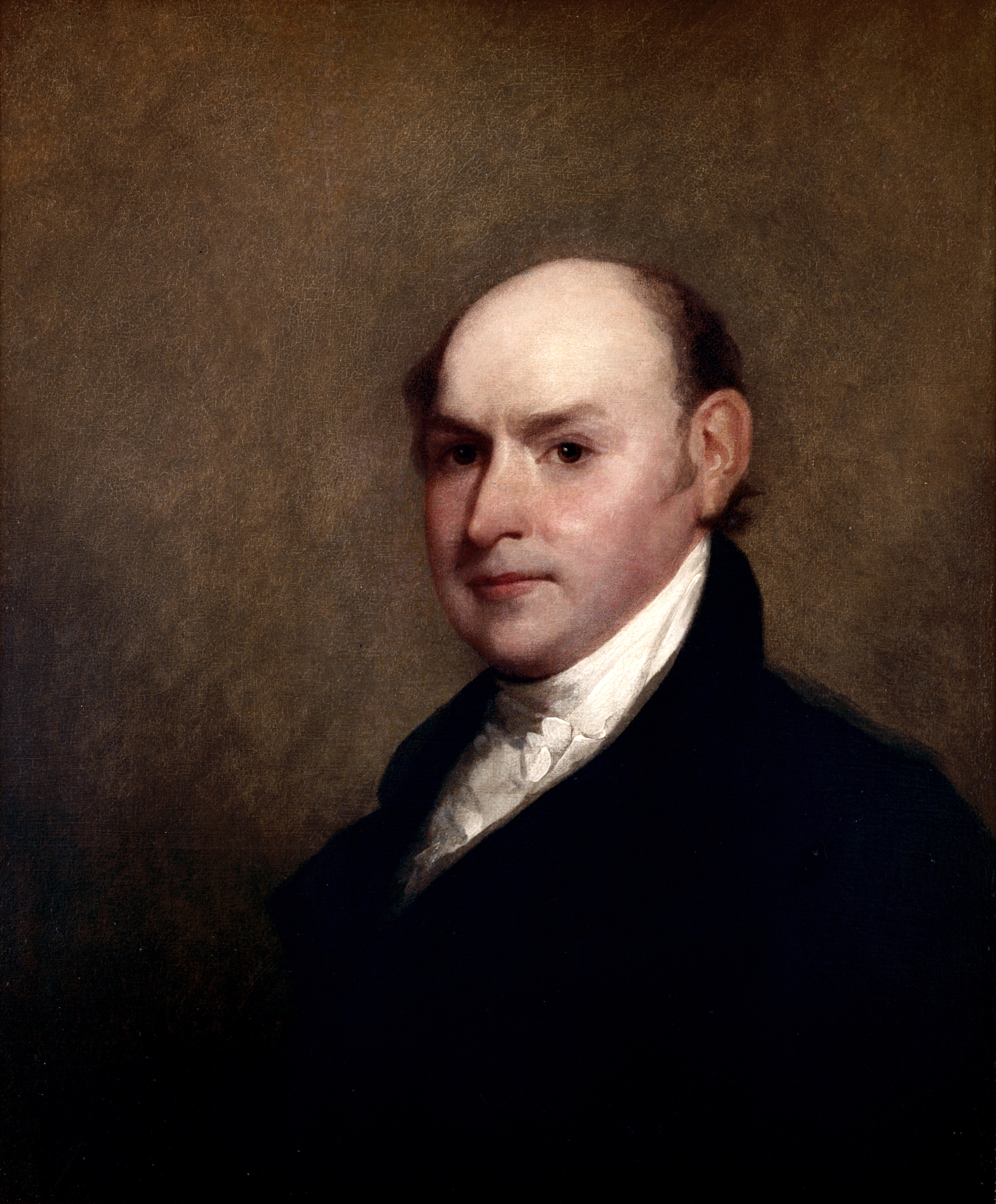
John Quincy Adams

The Treaty of Amity and Commerce between the Kingdom of Prussia and the United States of America (September 10, 1785) was a treaty negotiated by Count Karl-Wilhelm Finck von Finckenstein, Prussian Prime Minister, and Thomas Jefferson, United States Ambassador to France, and signed by Frederick the Great and George Washington. The treaty officially established commercial relations between the Kingdom of Prussia and the United States of America and was the first one signed by a European power with the United States after the American Revolutionary War. The Kingdom of Prussia became therefore one of the first nations to officially recognize the young American Republic after the Revolution. The first nation to recognize the US was Sweden, who during the Revolution signed a Treaty of Amity and Commerce.

The Treaty was signed to promote free trade and commerce and became a benchmark for subsequent free trade agreements and treaties. In addition, the Treaty demanded the unconditionally humane custody for war prisoners, a novelty at the time.

The Treaty was renewed in 1799 after negotiations with United States Ambassador to Prussia John Quincy Adams (1797 -1801).

== Main provisions ==
- Peace and friendship between the Kingdom of Prussia and the U.S.
- Mutual Most Favored Nation status with regard to commerce and navigation
- Mutual protection of all vessels and cargo when in U.S. or Prussian jurisdiction
- Mutual right for citizens of one country to hold land in other's territory
- Mutual right to search a ship of the other's coming out of an enemy port for contraband
- Mutual right to trade with enemy states of the other as long as those goods are not contraband
- If the two nations become enemies nine months protection of merchant ships in enemy territory
- Novelty: Mutual ban letter of marque (Article 20)
- Novelty: Unconditionally humane custody for war prisoner (Article 24)
- Mutual right to have Counsuls, Vice Counsuls, Agents, and Commissaries of one nation in the other's ports

== Co-authors ==
- Freiherr Friedrich Wilhelm von Thulemeyer
- Benjamin Franklin
- John Adams

== See also ==
- List of treaties
- 1785 in the United States

== Sources ==
- Giunta, Mary A., ed. Documents of the Emerging Nation: U.S. Foreign Relations 1775-1789. Wilmington, Del.: Scholarly Resources Inc., 1998.
- Middlekauff, Robert (1982). The Glorious Cause: The American Revolution, 1763-1789. New York: Oxford University Press.
- "Treaty of Amity and Commerce," The Avalon Project at Yale Law School. Treaty of Amity and Commerce Between His Majesty the King of Prussia, and the United States of America; September 10, 1785. Accessed 10 September 2010.
- Treaty of Amity and Commerce, July 11, 1799
