= Occidental College sexual assault controversy =

In April 2013, Occidental College was one of the first in a series of US higher education institutions to be accused of failing to take campus sex crimes seriously by improperly reporting and adjudicating sexual assaults and covering up rapes. Occidental students and faculty filed two federal complaints against the College, alleging violations of Title IX of the US Education Amendments of 1972 and the Clery Act.

== Complaint ==
In April 2013, Occidental students and faculty filed two federal civil rights complaints against Occidental College on behalf of 37 students, alumni, staff and faculty members, alleging violations of Title IX of the US Education Amendments of 1972 and dozens of violations of the Clery Act. The federal civil rights complaint alleges, "that the school deliberately discouraged victims from reporting sexual assaults, misled students about their rights during campus investigations, retaliated against whistle-blowers, and handed down minor punishment to known assailants who in some cases allegedly struck again." By April 2014, the number of federal complainants against the College had grown to 52. Of the additions, most "regard cases of retaliation by college officials to survivors of sexual assault or activists."

== Response of the College ==
In response to the sexual assault allegations, Occidental College President Jonathan Veitch took the following actions:

- Adopted a new interim sexual misconduct policy written by Pepper Hamilton attorneys Gina Smith and Leslie Gomez
- Hired a former Assistant District Attorney, Ruth Jones, as a full-time, independent Title IX coordinator
- Added a new 24-hour, seven-days-week telephone hotline
- Hired a full-time survivor advocate
- Conducted a comprehensive internal audit of its Clery Act reporting practices
- Doubled staff for Project SAFE, a campus advocacy and education program dedicated to addressing sexual misconduct*
- Expanded preventative education for all students through online programs, the office of Residence Education, Project SAFE, and a speakers’ series,
- Created a Sexual Assault Task Force made up of students, faculty and staff that was dissolved in April 2013.
- Created a Sexual Misconduct Advisory Board made up of students, faculty and staff that was dissolved in May 2014.

=== Criticism of response ===
Many have labeled these changes cosmetic and called their effectiveness into question. Students have alleged, for example, that the College failed to maintain the integrity of a new confidential reporting system and has tracked down and identified students who choose to report anonymously. Critics also point out that these changes fail to address the college's excessively lenient punishments for rapists and the vague language embedded in the school's official sexual misconduct policy—issues which were at the heart of the initial controversy. Veitch's retention of Dean of Students Barbara Avery, in whom Occidental faculty cast a 65-9 vote of no confidence due to her handling of sexual assault cases in 2013, has also come under harsh criticism.

Veitch came under fire for claiming in a campus-wide email that activists "actively sought to embarrass the College" by speaking against Occidental's sexual assault policy with local media. The email prompted severe outcry from students and faculty. Additional allegations against Veitch's administration and their handling of sexual assault have surfaced since implementing the above listed changes. In September 2013, allegations surfaced of administrators purported seizing laptops and personal property from faculty who have challenged the college's sexual assault policies, claiming that they were necessary for the Department of Education's investigation (the DOE denied these claims). Similar allegations of phone hackings and office break-ins have been reported.

Veitch also came under fire upon firing long-time Campus Safety Office Joseph "Joe" Cunje, much to the anger and frustration of faculty, students, staff, and alumni. Occidental College's fundraising call center, Telefund, was forced to cancel shifts and close after angry alumni boycotted giving donations once Cunje's firing was exposed. Edward Cunje, former Campus Safety Officer and Cunje's son, was also fired while he was on medical leave. The father-son Campus Safety team were both "terminated without warning" after speaking out against the College's mishandling of crime statistics, which is under the jurisdiction of Campus Safety. Occidental College Dean of Student Barbara Avery's mishandling of sexual assault reports was confirmed by Campus Safety Director Hollis Nieto in March 2013 and April 2014. Via email, Dean Avery announced Nieto's unexpected retirement shortly after her public statements calling into question Dean Avery's handling of sexual assault complaints. Nieto did not specify a reason for her departure, but said, "I"m not comfortable talking about some of it, but I will simply tell you that it's time."

Students have alleged, additionally, that the College, under Veitch's leadership, failed to maintain the integrity of a confidential reporting system begun in February 2009 and has tracked down and identified students who choose to report anonymously. Critics also point out that these changes fail to address the college's excessively lenient punishments for rapists such as a widely reported 5-page book report and the vague language embedded in the school's official sexual misconduct policy – issues which were at the heart of the initial controversy.

=== Jason Felch incident ===
In March 2014, the Los Angeles Times fired journalist Jason Felch, who had reported numerous stories on the sexual assault controversy at Occidental, after learning from Occidental administrators that he had a personal relationship with a source. The LA Times reported that the source, an Occidental faculty member, provided him with exaggerated information about the College's Clery Act violations. Critics, however, have challenged Felch's firing, arguing that his information is in fact accurate, that multiple sources corroborate Felch's initial findings, and that administrators learned about the faculty member's relationship with Felch by breaking into her office and stealing pages out of her personal journal.

In an audio recording of the meeting obtained by BuzzFeed, Veitch told faculty, “As I heard that Ralph [Frammolino, an ex-partner of Felch retained as a public relations consultant] had written a book on the Getty with Jason Felch, that seemed to be a great way to understand how Jason was thinking about the story." Veitch added, “If [the firm] didn’t have any connection we wouldn’t have had access to the Los Angeles Times" saying that he knew that their previous "financial relationship" presented a "conflict of interest."
