= Skotheim =

Skotheim is a Norwegian surname. Notable people with the surname include:

- Robert Skotheim (born 1933), American educator
- Sander Skotheim (born 2002), Norwegian multi-event athlete

== See also ==
- Johanna Skottheim (born 1994), Swedish biathlete
- Scott Heim (born 1966), American writer and editor
