= Steven S. Koblik =

American academic and executive

Steven S. Koblik (born August 10, 1941) is an American academic and executive. He is the former president of the Huntington Library and Reed College. Previously, he taught Swedish history and international politics at Pomona College for more than two decades. He is a member of the American Academy of Arts and Sciences.

Academic offices
Preceded by James L. Powell	13th President of Reed College; 1992 – 2001	Succeeded by Colin Diver
Preceded by Robert Skotheim	7th President of Huntington Library; 2001 – 2015	Succeeded by Laura Skandera Trombley
