= Martin Ridge (historian) =

American historian (1923–2003)

Director of the Huntington Library
- Interim
- In office January 1, 1988 – June 30, 1988
- Preceded by: Robert Middlekauff
- Succeeded by: Robert Skotheim

Personal details
- Born: May 7, 1923 Chicago, Illinois
- Died: September 22, 2003 (aged 80) Pasadena, California

Academic background
- Education: Chicago Teachers College (BEd); Northwestern University (PhD)
- Thesis: Ignatius Donnelly: The Making of a Tribune (1951)
- Doctoral advisor: Ray Allen Billington

Academic work
- Discipline: History
- Institutions: Westminster College; San Diego State University; Indiana University; Huntington Library; California Institute of Technology

Martin Ridge (May 7, 1923 – September 22, 2003) was an American historian and director of research at the Huntington Library. He is particularly known for the 1982 5th edition of "Westward expansion: a history of the American frontier" co-authored with Ray Allen Billington.

== Biography ==
Born and raised in Chicago, Ridge attended Francis W Parker School. He wanted to become an elementary school teacher, and obtained his BEd at the Chicago Teachers College, now Chicago State University in 1943. After serving in the United States Merchant Marine in World War II, he continued his studies at Northwestern University, where he obtained his PhD in 1951 under Ray Allen Billington with the thesis, Ignatius Donnelly: The Making of a Tribune. In 1962 the work was revised and expanded, and was published as Ignatius Donnelly: Portrait of a Politician.

After graduation in 1951 Ridge embarked upon his academic career as lecturer at Westminster College. In 1955 he moved to San Diego State University; from 1966 to 1977 he taught at Indiana University, where he edited the Journal of American History. In 1977 he moved to southern California when he was appointed director of research at Huntington Library, and joined the California Institute of Technology faculty. Ridge served at the Huntington Library until his retirement in 1993, and at Caltech until 1995.

Ridge was editor of the Journal of American History (JAH) from 1966 to 1978. He was awarded a Guggenheim Fellowships in 1965. He co-founded the Western History Association in 1961 and served as its president.

Ridge died in Pasadena, California, on September 22, 2003, after being in failing health for some time.

== Selected publications ==
- Ray Allen Billington, Martin Ridge. Western Expansion: A History of the American Frontier. UNM Press. 1949; 2002.
- Martin Ridge. Ignatius Donnelly: The Portrait of a Politician. PhD thesis revised and expanded, University of Chicago Press. 1962.
- Annenberg School of Communications (University of Southern California). Center for Study of the American Experience, & Ridge, M. (1981). The New Bilingualism: An American Dilemma: Proceedings of a Conference Sponsored by Center for Study of the American Experience, the Annenberg School of Communications, University of Southern California, May 1980. Los Angeles, Calif.: University of Southern California Press; New Brunswick, NJ.

Articles, a selection:

- Ridge, Martin. "The Life of an Idea: The Significance of Frederick Jackson Turner's Frontier Thesis." Montana: The Magazine of Western History (1991): 2–13.
- Ridge, Martin. "The American West: From Frontier to Region." New Mexico Historical Review 64.2 (1989).

Academic offices
Preceded by Robert Middlekauff	Interim Director of Huntington Library; Jan 1988 – Jun 1988	Succeeded by Robert Skotheim
