= Count Karl-Wilhelm Finck von Finckenstein =

Prussian diplomat and prime minister (1714–1800)

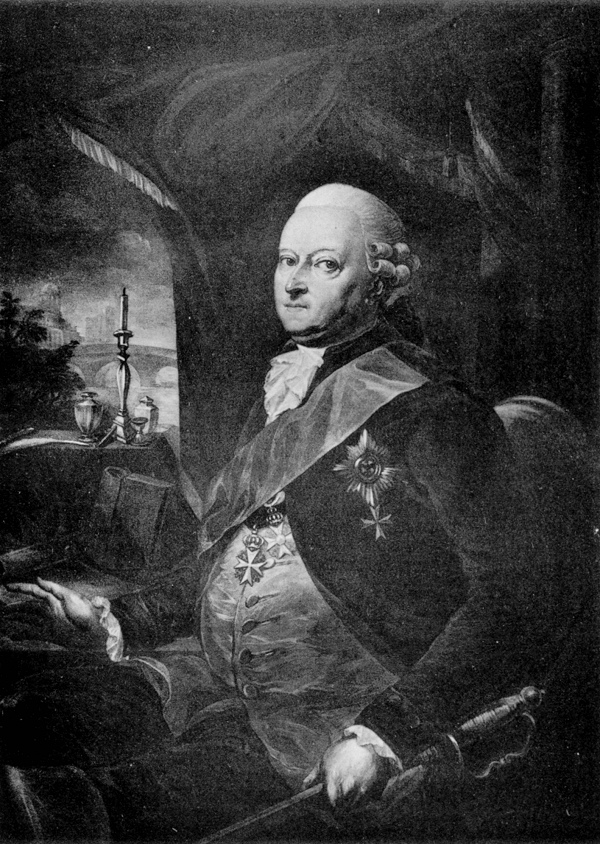
Count Karl Wilhelm Finck von Finckenstein

Karl Wilhelm Reichsgraf Finck von Finckenstein (11 February 1714 in Berlin; 3 January 1800 in Berlin) was a Count of the Holy Roman Empire of the German Nation, a Prussian diplomat, and later Prime Minister of Prussia.

== Family ==
He was the son of Count Albrecht Konrad Finck von Finckenstein, who was a field marshal and also governor of the Crown Prince of Prussia, the future King Frederick II. His mother was Sophie Henrietta Susanne Gilgenburg (1723-1762). Finckenstein studied in Geneva, after which he travelled in France and the Low Countries. In 1735 he was appointed to the Prussian diplomatic service.

== Military career ==
Frederick II, who became king in 1740, knew Finckenstein well from his own childhood and had great confidence in him. In 1740 Frederick sent him as minister to Sweden, then to Denmark, and in 1742 to Great Britain. In 1744 he was sent again to Sweden, when Frederick's sister Louisa Ulrika married Adolf Frederick of Sweden. In 1747, Finckenstein was made a Minister of state, and became envoy to Russia.

He returned to Prussia in 1749, where he became a Cabinet Minister and henceforth the most trusted advisor to the King.

During the Seven Years' War, Frederick issued a secret decree on 10 January 1757, "in the case of his death or capture", which appointed Finckenstein as Regent of Prussia in that event.

After the end of the Seven Years' War, Finckenstein had sole control of Prussia's foreign relations, and he also had a prevailing influence over the King. This continued after Frederick's death in 1786, under his successor Frederick William II, and right up to Finckenstein's death in 1800.

In 1785, he negotiated the Prussian-American Treaty of Amity and Commerce with the United States Ambassador to France Thomas Jefferson (1785–1789), and renewed it in 1799 after negotiations with the United States Ambassador to Prussia John Quincy Adams (1797–1801).

The Treaty was signed to promote free trade and commerce and became a benchmark for subsequent free trade agreements and treaties. It was the first one signed by a European power with the United States after the American Revolutionary War. The Kingdom of Prussia became therefore one of the first nations to officially recognize the young American Republic. Additionally, the Treaty demanded the unconditionally humane treatment of war prisoner, a novelty at the time.

Finckenstein died on 3 January 1800. He was 85 years old, and had been a State Minister for 53 years. He was a knight of the Order of the Black Eagle, the highest Prussian order.

== Sources ==
- "Финк фон Финкенштейн, Карл-Вильгельм" . Brockhaus and Efron Encyclopedic Dictionary (in Russian). 1906.
