= Robert Skotheim =

American historian (born 1933)

14th President of Occidental College
- In office January 1, 2008 – June 30, 2009
- Preceded by: Susan Westerberg Prager
- Succeeded by: Jonathan Veitch

6th President of Huntington Library
- In office July 1, 1988 – June 30, 2001
- Preceded by: Robert Middlekauff; Martin Ridge (interim)
- Succeeded by: Steven S. Koblik

10th President of Whitman College
- In office 1975–1988
- Preceded by: Donald Sheehan
- Succeeded by: David Evans Maxwell

Personal details
- Born: January 31, 1933 (age 93) Seattle, Washington, U.S.
- Spouse: Nadine Esther Vail (m. 1953)
- Children: 3
- Education: Princeton University; University of Washington (B.A., Ph.D.)
- Occupation: College professor and administrator
- Known for: Historian of intellectual history

Robert Allen Skotheim (born January 31, 1933) is an American educator who has served as president of several colleges and institutions.

== Biography ==
In 1933, Skotheim was born to Sivert O., an emigrant from Norway, and Marjorie Skotheim, school teachers in West Seattle. He attended Fauntleroy School and West Seattle High School. He was educated at Princeton University, graduated with a B.A. in history from the University of Washington, and went on to obtain a Ph.D. from University of Washington Graduate School. In 1966, he was awarded a Guggenheim Fellowship and spent a year in France. Afterwards, he taught history at the University of Colorado, Boulder and then became provost of Hobart and William Smith College in Geneva, New York.

From 1975 to 1988, he served as the 10th president of Whitman College, where he led a $50 million capital campaign to increase the endowment and researched the history of the college. In 1988, after 12 years at Whitman, he became president at the Huntington Library. In June 1992, he announced a $4.5 million gift to the library endowment. On June 30, 2001, he stepped down from the Huntington.

On January 1, 2008, Skotheim assumed the role of interim president of Occidental College, replacing president Susan Westerberg Prager, who announced her intention to resign in mid-November. During his tenure, Skotheim was one of the oldest college presidents in the nation. On July 1, 2009, Skotheim stepped down and Jonathan Veitch, formerly dean of Eugene Lang College, took the reins.

== Honors and legacy ==
The Nadine and Robert Skotheim Director of Education at The Huntington is endowed in his honor.

== Personal life ==
On June 14, 1953, Skotheim married Nadine Esther Vail, in Seattle, Washington, and they had three children: Marjorie, Kris and Julie.

== Awards ==
In 2000, Skotheim was awarded an honorary Doctor of Humane Letters (L.H.D.) degree from Whittier College.

== Selected publications ==
=== Books ===
- Skotheim, Robert Allen (1966). American Intellectual Histories and Historians. Princeton, NJ: Princeton University Press. ISBN 0691005710.
- Skotheim, Robert Allen (1969). The Historian and the Climate of Opinion. Boston, MA: Addsion-Wesley Press. ISBN 0201070405.
- Skotheim, Robert Allen (1972). Totalitarianism and American Social Thought. Holt, Rinehart & Winston of Canada Ltd. ISBN 0030844029.

=== Articles ===
- Skotheim, Robert A.; Vanderbilt, Kermit (Summer 1962). "Vernon Louis Parrington: The Mind and Art of a Historian of Ideas". Pacific Northwest Quarterly. 53 (3): 100–113. JSTOR 40487742.

== Video ==
- Appearances on C-SPAN

Academic offices
Preceded by Donald Sheehan	10th President of Whitman College; 1975 – 1988	Succeeded by David Evans Maxwell
Preceded by Robert Middlekauff; Martin Ridge (interim)	6th President of Huntington Library; 1988 – 2001	Succeeded by Steven S. Koblik
Preceded by Susan Westerberg Prager	14th President of Occidental College; 2008 – 2009	Succeeded by Jonathan Veitch
