= Occidental College =

Private liberal arts college in Los Angeles, California

- Motto: Occidens Proximus Orienti (Latin)
- Motto in English: The West is nearest the East
- Type: Private liberal arts college
- Established: April 20, 1887; 139 years ago
- Religious affiliation: Non-sectarian (historically Presbyterian)
- Academic affiliations: NAICU; Annapolis Group; Oberlin Group; CLAC; Project Pericles
- Endowment: $654.3 million (2024)
- President: Tom Stritikus
- Faculty: 276 (fall 2023)
- Students: 1,854 (fall 2023)
- Location: Los Angeles, California, U.S. 34.1271°N 118.2109°W
- Campus: Urban, 120 acres (49 ha)
- Colors: Orange and black
- Nickname: Tigers
- Sporting affiliations: NCAA Division III – SCIAC
- Mascot: Oswald the Tiger
- Website: oxy.edu

Occidental College (informally Oxy) is a private liberal arts college in Los Angeles, California, United States. Founded in 1887 as a coeducational college by clergy and members of the Presbyterian Church, it became non-sectarian in 1910. It is one of the oldest liberal arts colleges on the West Coast of the United States.

Occidental's current 120-acre (49 ha) campus is located in Eagle Rock, Los Angeles, and was designed by architect Myron Hunt. Due to its proximity to Hollywood and its architecture, the campus is frequently used as a filming location for film and television productions. Occidental is a founding member of the Southern California Intercollegiate Athletic Conference and its 20 varsity sports teams compete in NCAA Division III. The college's curriculum emphasizes diversity, global literacy, and civic engagement.

Notable alumni include President Barack Obama , a Cabinet member, several members of the United States Congress, CEOs of notable companies, 10 Rhodes Scholars, and recipients of the Pulitzer Prize, Academy Award, BAFTA Award, Tony Award and Emmy Award.

== History ==
=== Early history ===
Pershing Square campus, ca. 1896

Occidental College was founded on April 20, 1887, by a group of Presbyterian clergy, missionaries, and laymen, including James George Bell, Lyman Stewart, and Thomas Bard. The cornerstone of the school's first building was laid in September 1887 in the Boyle Heights now East Los Angeles neighborhood of Los Angeles. The college's first term began a year later with 27 male and 13 female students, and tuition of $50 a year.

In 1896, the Boyle Heights building was destroyed by fire. The college temporarily relocated to the old St. Vincent's College campus on Hill Street before a new site was selected in Highland Park in 1898. Eventually, the college erected three main buildings: the Academy Building, the Stimson Library, and the Hall of Arts and Letters (the Hall still stands today, converted to apartments). The Highland Park site was also bisected by the tracks of the Santa Fe Railroad, and was the site of two presidential visits, first by William Howard Taft in 1909 and subsequently by Theodore Roosevelt in 1911.

In 1909, the Pomona College Board of Trustees suggested a merger between Pomona and Occidental, but the proposal came to nothing. The following year, the college severed formal ties with the Presbyterian Church and became a non-sectarian, non-denominational institution. The small size of the 15-acre (6.1 ha) campus and the disruption caused by frequent freight trains pushed the college's trustees to find a new location.

=== 1900s ===
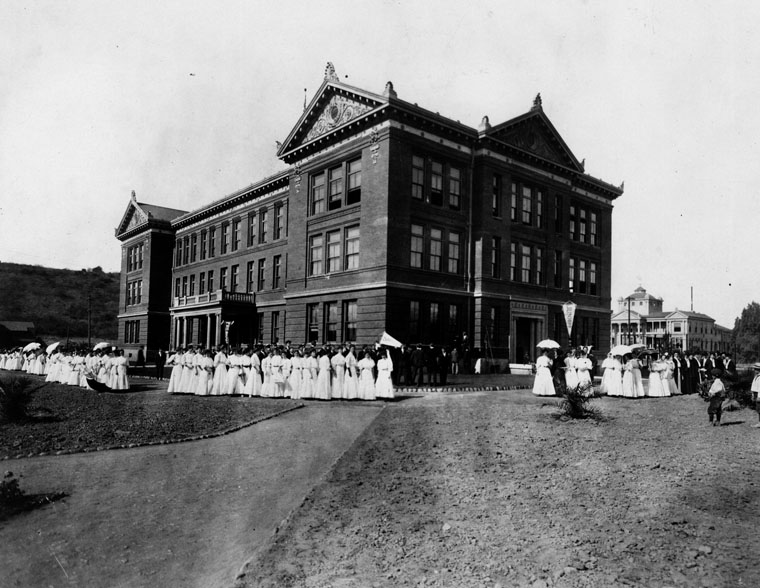
Highland Park campus, 1904

In 1912, the school began construction of a new campus located in Los Angeles' Eagle Rock neighborhood. The Eagle Rock campus was designed by noted California architect Myron Hunt, also known as the planner of the California Institute of Technology (Caltech) campus and as designer of the Huntington Library and Art Gallery and the Rose Bowl. That same year, Occidental President John Willis Baer announced the trustees' decision to convert Occidental College into an all-men's institution. The plans were met with widespread backlash from students and faculty who protested the change. The community outcry garnered national headlines and the board later dropped the proposal.

Two weeks after Booker T. Washington came to visit Occidental, on March 27, 1914, Swan, Fowler, and Johnson Halls were dedicated at its new Eagle Rock campus. Patterson Field, today one of the oldest collegiate sports stadiums in Los Angeles, was opened in 1916. In April 1917, shortly after the United States entered World War I, the college formed a Students Army Training Corps to aid the war effort.

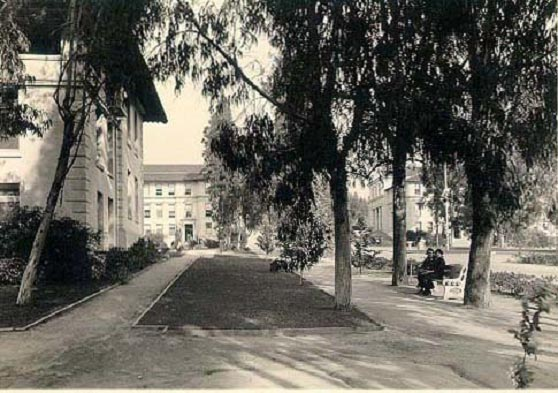
Occidental College in the 1920s

Under Occidental President Remsen Bird, the school opened a series of new Hunt-designed buildings, including Clapp Library (1924), Hillside Theatre and a women's dormitory (Orr Hall) in 1925, Alumni Gymnasium (1926), the Freeman Student Union (1928) and a music and speech building (1929). The Delta of California chapter of Phi Beta Kappa was established at Occidental in 1926, at a time when the only other chapters in California were at Stanford, UC Berkeley, and Pomona.

English novelist Aldous Huxley, who had spoken at Occidental's convocation ceremony in the then-new Thorne Hall in 1938, lampooned President Remsen Bird as Dr. Herbert Mulge of Tarzana College in his 1939 novel, After Many a Summer Dies the Swan. Huxley was never again invited back to campus.

During World War II, many students left Occidental to fight in the war. In July 1943, the U.S. Navy established a Navy V-12 officer training program on campus that produced hundreds of graduates before it was disbanded in 1945 at the end of the war. Occidental President Remsen Bird worked behind the scenes to help Oxy students of Japanese descent continue their education despite mandatory evacuation orders; his letters are included in the Japanese American Relocation Collection in Clapp Library.

After having its first Rhodes Scholar, Clarence Spaulding, named in 1908, Oxy seniors John Paden and Aaron Segal were awarded Rhodes Scholarships in 1958, the only time Occidental has produced two Rhodes Scholars in a single year. Paden and Segal were among the ten Occidental students who participated in Crossroads Africa that year, a forerunner to the Peace Corps that later became a national program.

In 1969, 42 students were suspended for peacefully protesting military recruiting on campus. One year later, faculty voted to suspend classes in the wake of the Kent State shootings and America's invasion of Cambodia. Subsequently, Oxy students wrote 7,000 letters to Washington D.C., protesting U.S. involvement in the war in Southeast Asia. Occidental launched one of the country's first Upward Bound programs in 1966, aimed at increasing the number of low-income, underrepresented high school students who become the first in their family to go to college.

Also in 1969, the school opened its first two co-ed dormitories, and two more followed a year later. In 1988, John Brooks Slaughter, formerly Chancellor of the University of Maryland, became Occidental's first black president. Building on faculty and student advocacy and a series of grants the college had received previously to increase the diversity of the Occidental student body, Slaughter led the process of creating a new mission statement that is still used today. Also, Slaughter led the college's community outreach expansion with the creation of the Center for Volunteerism and Community Service, the predecessor for the current Center for Community Based Learning.

In November 1990, the college rededicated the campus' main chapel as the Herrick Memorial Chapel and Interfaith Center. The school also took down the crosses in the chapel in an attempt to "broaden Occidental's appeal among non-Christian students."

=== 2000s ===
In July 2006, Susan Westerberg Prager became Occidental's first female president. She left her position in 2007. Robert Skotheim served as interim president. In July 2009, Jonathan Veitch became Occidental's 15th president, and the first native Angeleno president.

The college received national scrutiny in 2014 when the U.S. Department of Education named Occidental College as one of 55 higher education institutions under investigation "for possible violations of federal law over the handling of sexual violence and harassment." In response to student and faculty outcry the college adopted a new interim sexual misconduct policy, hired a former assistant district attorney as a full-time, independent Title IX coordinator, and added a new 24-hour, 7-days-a-week telephone hotline. The school also created a permanent Sexual Misconduct Advisory Board made up of students, faculty, and staff. Two years later, the investigation was concluded with the Office of Civil Rights finding that "the preponderance of the evidence does not support a conclusion that the College violated Title IX, except with respect to the issue of promptness in several cases during the 2012-13 school years."

President Barack Obama attended Occidental for two years prior to transferring to Columbia University. In 2015, "birthers" falsely claimed that Obama's Occidental College transcript revealed he received financial aid as a foreign student from Indonesia after the resurgence of a fake news story from 2009.

In July 2020, Harry J. Elam Jr., formerly vice provost for undergraduate education and Drama professor at Stanford University, became Occidental's 16th president. In August 2023, it was announced that he will retire in 2024 for health-related reasons. On March 26, 2024, it was announced that Tom Stritkus, late of Fort Lewis College, will become Occidental's president effective July 1.

== Campus ==
Architect Myron Hunt created the original campus master plan for Occidental's Eagle Rock campus in 1911. He structured the campus in a Mediterranean style, with covered walkways and tile roofs. The campus landscape was designed and developed by Beatrix Farrand in the late 1930s. All of the 19 buildings designed by Hunt remain in use today.

The campus is noted for the outdoor Remsen Bird Amphitheater, where between 1960 and 1996 plays and musicals were performed in the summer. Financial cutbacks caused the theater department to end the summer festival programs. Since 1996 the Occidental Children's Theater has performed there each summer.

Occidental College was ranked as the sixth "Most Beautiful" campus by Newsweek in 2012. The campus is home to a 1-megawatt ground-mounted solar array, which is the largest hillside array on an American college campus and the largest of its kind in Los Angeles. The 4,886-panel installation was completed in Spring 2013 and inaugurated on the school's 126-year anniversary.

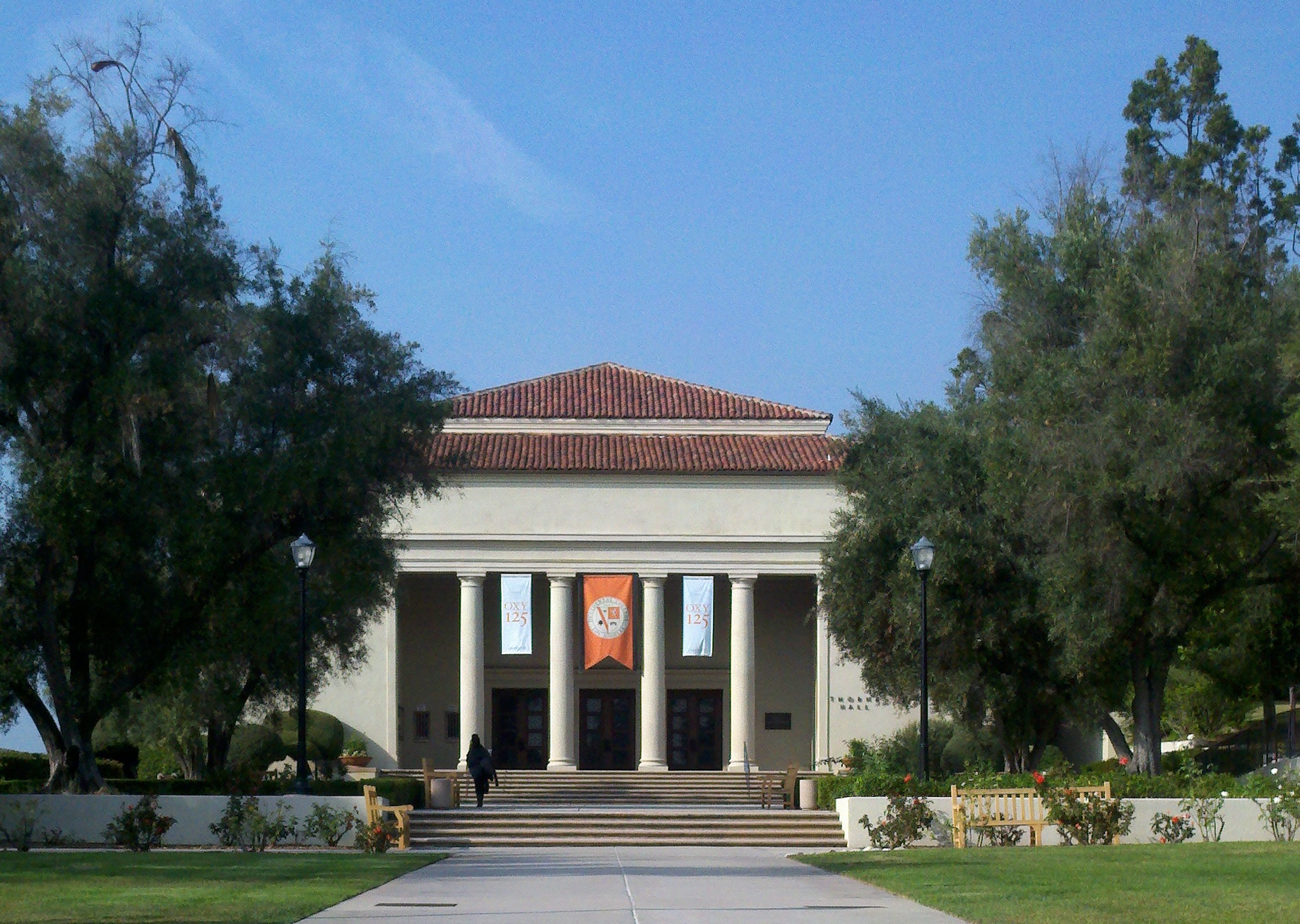
Thorne Hall

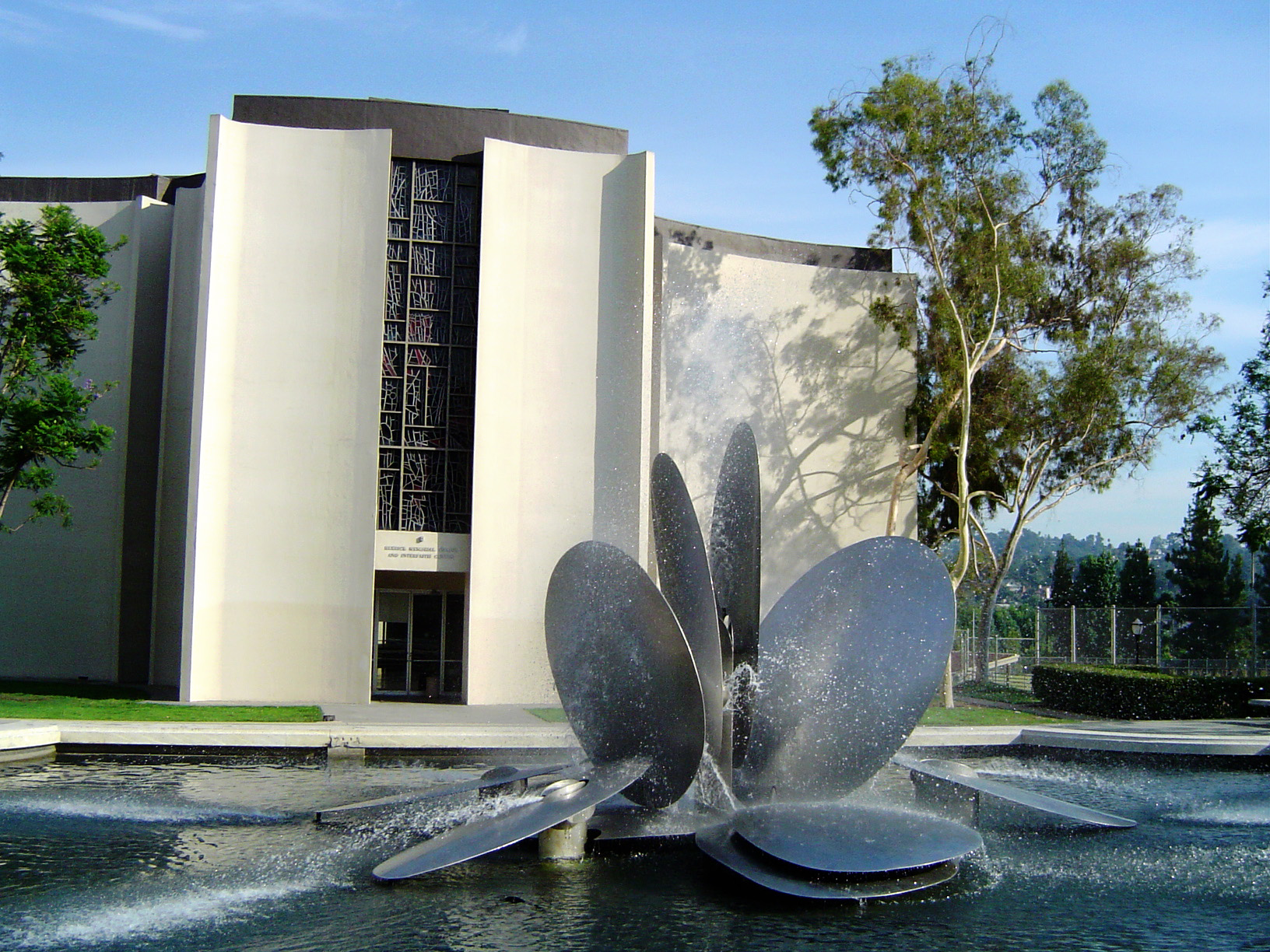
Herrick Interfaith Center, built 1964

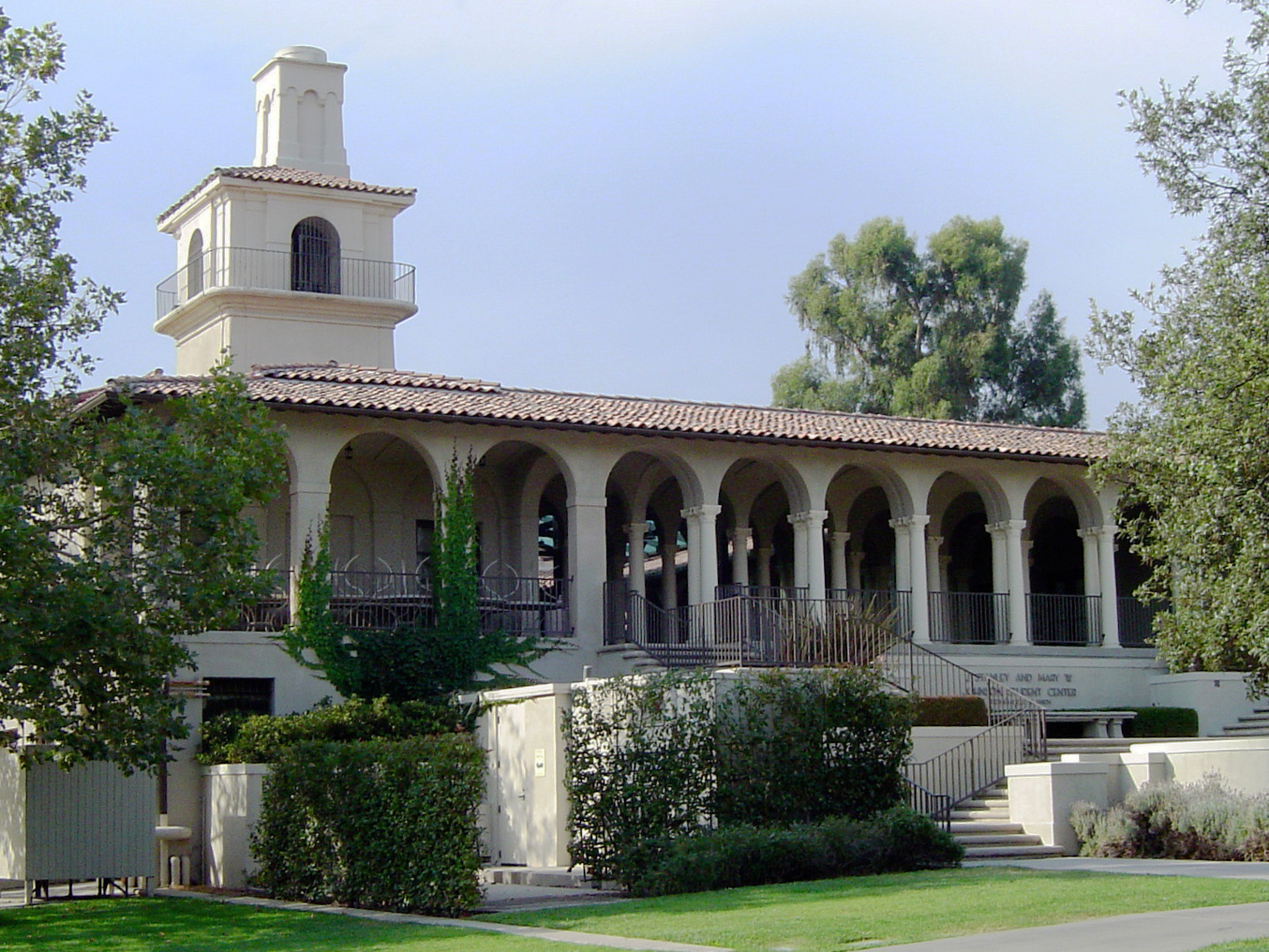
Johnson Student Center and Freeman College Union

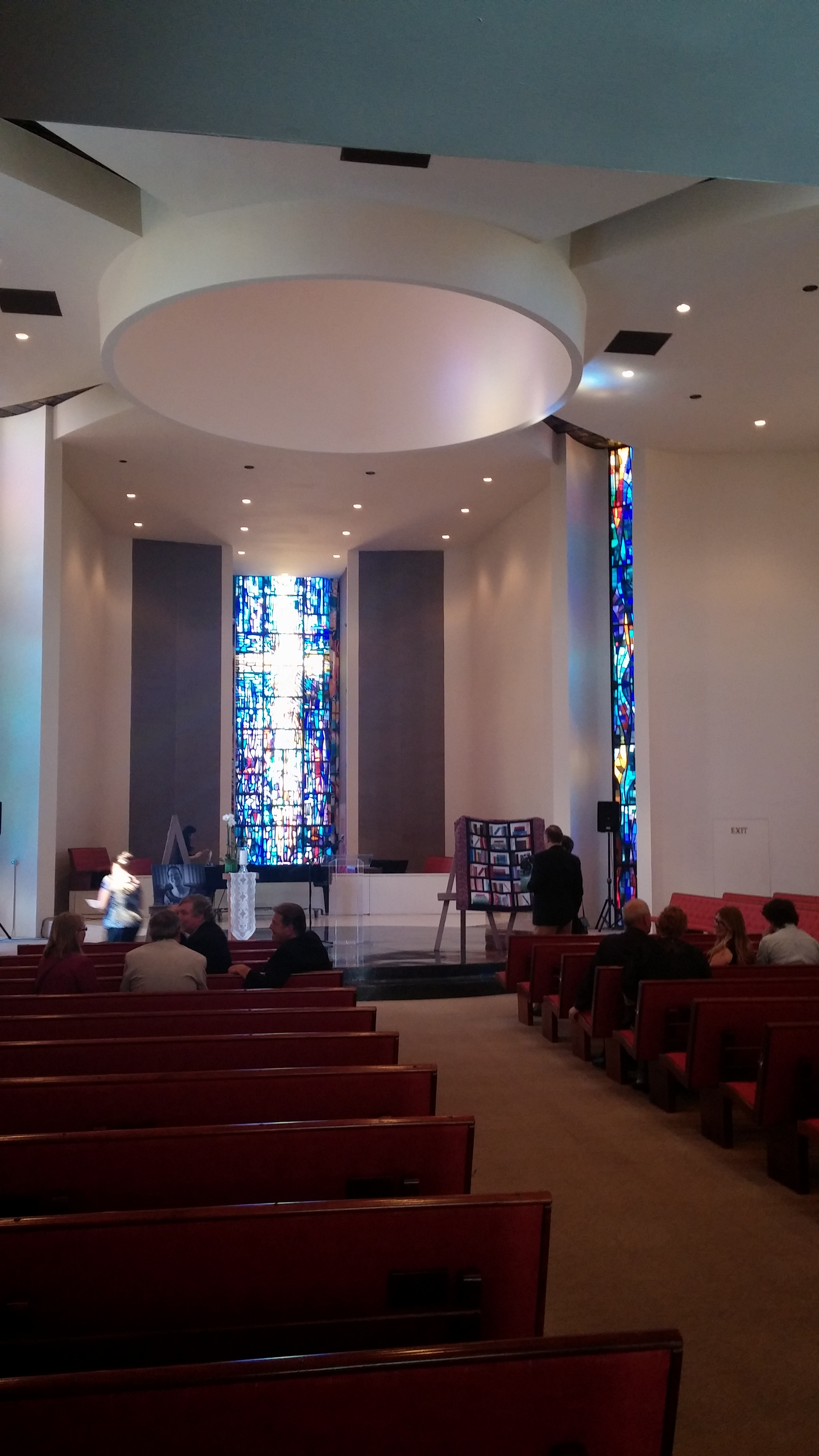
Herrick Chapel interior

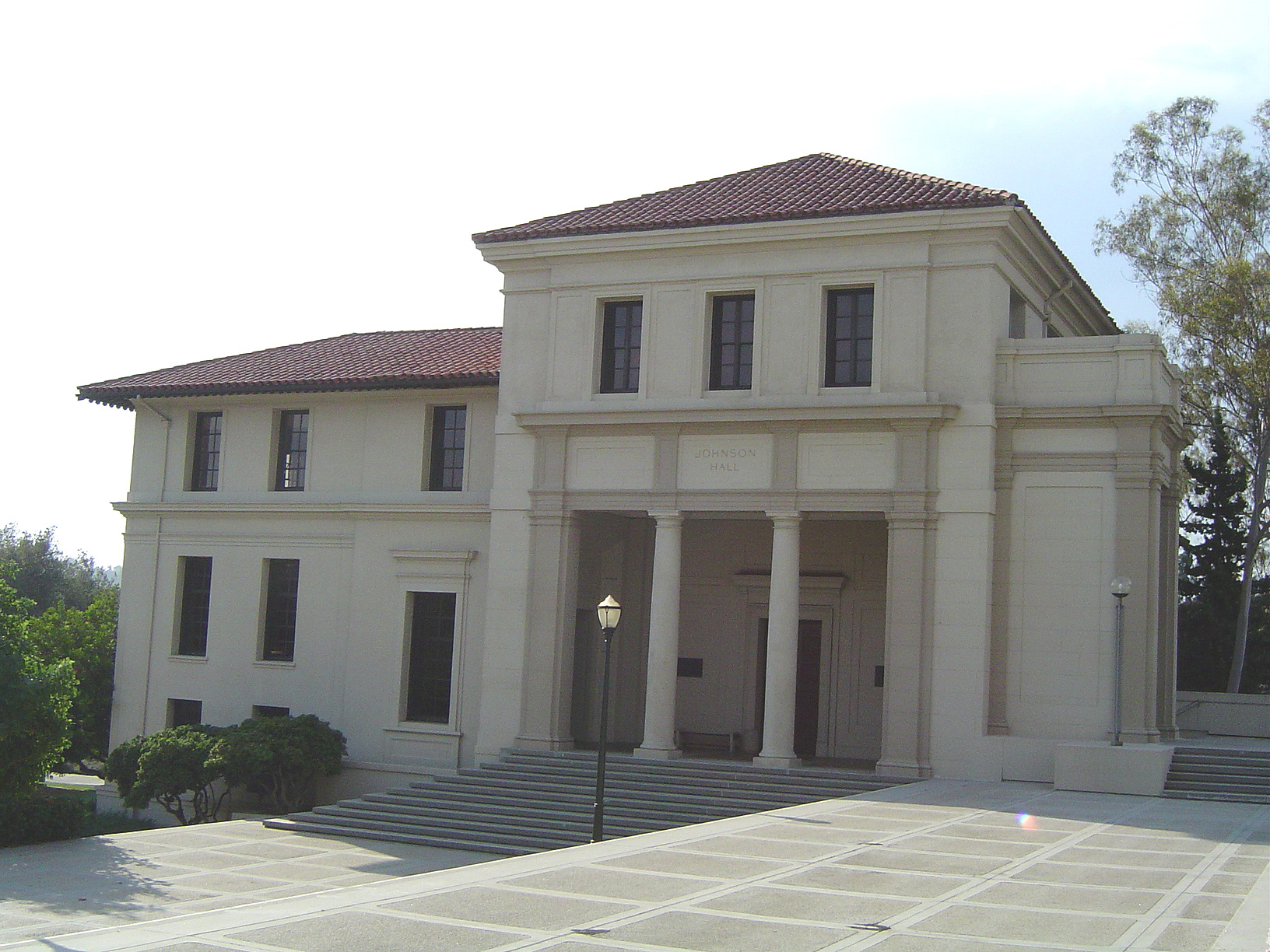
Johnson Hall

== Academics ==
There are more than 40 majors offered on campus (and nine minor-only programs, including Public Health, Linguistics, and Classical Studies) and a 9:1 student–faculty ratio. The average class size is 18 students and most students take four classes per semester. the most popular majors, based on 2021 graduates, were Econometrics & Quantitative Economics (46), Psychology (38), Biology/Biological Sciences (37), Political Science & Government (34), Environmental Studies (31), International Relations and Affairs (31).

=== Rankings ===
Academic rankings

Liberal arts
- U.S. News & World Report: 34
- Washington Monthly: 46

National
- Forbes: 102
- WSJ/College Pulse: 95

Since 1908, Occidental has graduated ten Rhodes Scholars. In U.S. News & World Report's 2025 rankings of American liberal arts colleges, Occidental was tied for 34th overall, tied for 18th in "Top Performers in Social Mobility," 71st for "Best Value," and tied at 102nd for "Economics." The 2017 edition of the Fiske Guide to Colleges gave Occidental four-star ratings (out of five) in academics and quality of life. Princeton Review's The Best 381 Colleges 2017 Edition gave Occidental ratings of 91 (out of 100) in academics and quality of life and 95 in financial aid. In Forbes' 2019 ranking of America's Top Colleges, Occidental ranks 102nd out of 650 liberal arts colleges, universities and service academies. Kiplinger's "Best College Values 2019" rankings places Occidental 58th among 149 liberal arts colleges.

=== Admissions ===
Fall admission statistics

	2024	2023	2022	2021	2020	2019	2018	2017	2016	2015	2014	2013	2012
Applicants	6,461	6,573	6,305	6,495	6,939	7,501	7,281	7,281	6,775	6,409	5,911	6,071	6,072
Admits	2,854	2,622	2,484	2,484	2,838	2,752	2,716	2,716	2,831	2,936	2,652	2,552	2,574
Admit rate	44.2%	39.9%	39.4%	38.2%	40.9%	36.7%	37.3%	37.3%	41.7%	45.8%	44.8%	42.0%	42.3%
Enrolled	509	532	531	535	402	562	566	566	502	517	546	548	530

U.S. News deemed Occidental's admissions "more selective," with the class of 2020 acceptance rate being 37.3%. Of those admitted submitting such data, 52% were in the top 10% of their high school class. The SAT 25th–75th percentile scores were 1810–2120. Of those admitted to the class of 2020, 50% identified as persons of color, and 13% of those admitted were international students.

The class of 2028 (enrolled in 2024) SAT composite 25th–75th percentile scores were 1400–1495, and ACT composite 25th–75th percentile scores were 31–34. 49% of enrolled students were in the top 10% of their class.

In 2023, it was announced by President Harry Elam that Occidental eliminated legacy preferences to the children of alumni in admissions.

== Student life ==
At the beginning of every school year, freshmen participate in convocation, a formal ceremony welcoming new students to the college in which the faculty wear their full academic regalia and students don robes. Founders Day is celebrated annually at the school on April 20, the day in 1887 when Occidental's incorporation papers were officially signed by the California Secretary of State.

There are also themed-living communities which consist of the Multicultural Hall in Pauley (open to all years), all-women housing (Berkus House, named after alumnus Dave Berkus), Food Justice house, and several communities that support and uplift the experiences of students of color and LGBTQIA students.

=== Media ===
The campus newspaper is The Occidental, an independent, student-run publication. It has been published continuously since 1893.

KOXY is a student-run campus radio station, in operation in the 1960s and 1970s, and again since 2000. It originally operated on the frequency 104.7 in and around campus from 1968 to 2009, but switched to only being available by webstream in 2009. KOXY sponsors several on-campus events.

In 2010, students launched a TV station called CatAList; The station produces 20–30 minutes of student-run content weekly.

=== Greek life ===
Occidental College's Greek Council consists of roughly eight members, both sororities and fraternities.

== Athletics ==
Occidental is one of the five schools that founded the Southern California Intercollegiate Athletic Conference (SCIAC) in 1915 and is currently a member of the SCIAC and NCAA Division III. Occidental features 21 varsity sports teams and a program of club sports and intramural competition. Approximately 25 percent of the student body participates in a varsity sports program.

During the 2006–2007 athletic season, the Tigers cross country, American football and basketball teams were Southern California Intercollegiate Athletic Conference champions. In 2014, diver Jessica Robson set the Southern California Intercollegiate Athletic Conference records for both 1m and 3m diving. The school's Blackshirts Rugby union team was also league champion for the first time in five years. In 2011, Jeremy Castro ('99) and Patrick Guthrie ('86) steered the squad to a NSCRO final, falling to Longwood University 36–27 in Virginia Beach, Virginia. In addition the college has a dance team that also performs at every home football and basketball game.

Occidental athletics date back to 1894, when the college helped organize the first intercollegiate athletic competition in Southern California. Since then, Oxy has produced more than a dozen Olympians, world-record holders, and national champions, including 1935 national girls' tennis champion Pat Henry Yeomans '38, two-time diving gold medalist Sammy Lee '43, and pole vault silver medalist Bob Gutowski '57.

Occidental has long-standing football rivalries with Pomona College and Whittier College; the Tigers have played both the Sagehens and the Poets over 100 times. In 1982, the Occidental College football team had the rare opportunity for national prominence when, due to the 1982 National Football League strike, their game with San Diego was broadcast on national television. In 2017, Occidental cancelled the remainder of its football season due to lack of healthy players, as few as 30 in some cases. The team forfeited two games and was outscored in the other three 170–19. The Tigers played nine games in 2019, finishing with a 1–8 record. It was the final season for the Tigers football team. The school dropped football in 2020.

In 2011, Occidental College lost a basketball game to Caltech with a score of 46 to 45 giving the Caltech Beavers their first conference win in 26 years and putting an end to their 310-game losing streak.

In 2019, the Occidental Men's Basketball Team reached the SCIAC championship game, ultimately losing to Pomona Pitzer in the Tournament Championship game.

Famous Occidental College Tigers in the field of athletics include NFL coach Jim E. Mora, former American Football League Most Valuable Player and politician Jack Kemp, former National Football League (NFL) player Vance Mueller, three-time PGA tour champion and 2011 U.S. Senior Open champion Olin Browne, Canadian Football League (CFL) Quarterback Bryan James Scott (Toronto Argonauts) and CFL player Justin Goltz (Winnipeg Blue Bombers).

== Notable people ==
Barack Obama, 44th U.S. President, Nobel Peace Prize laureate (transferred)

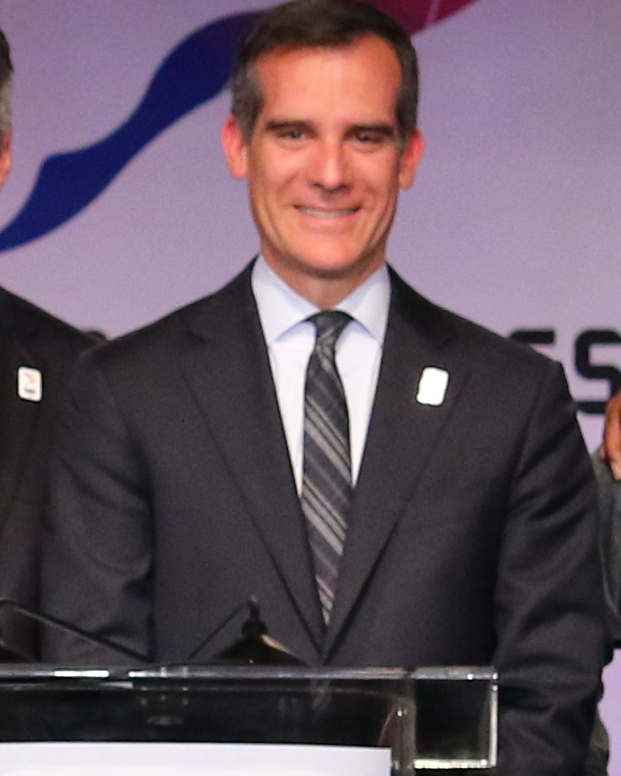
Eric Garcetti, 42nd Mayor of Los Angeles (Professor)

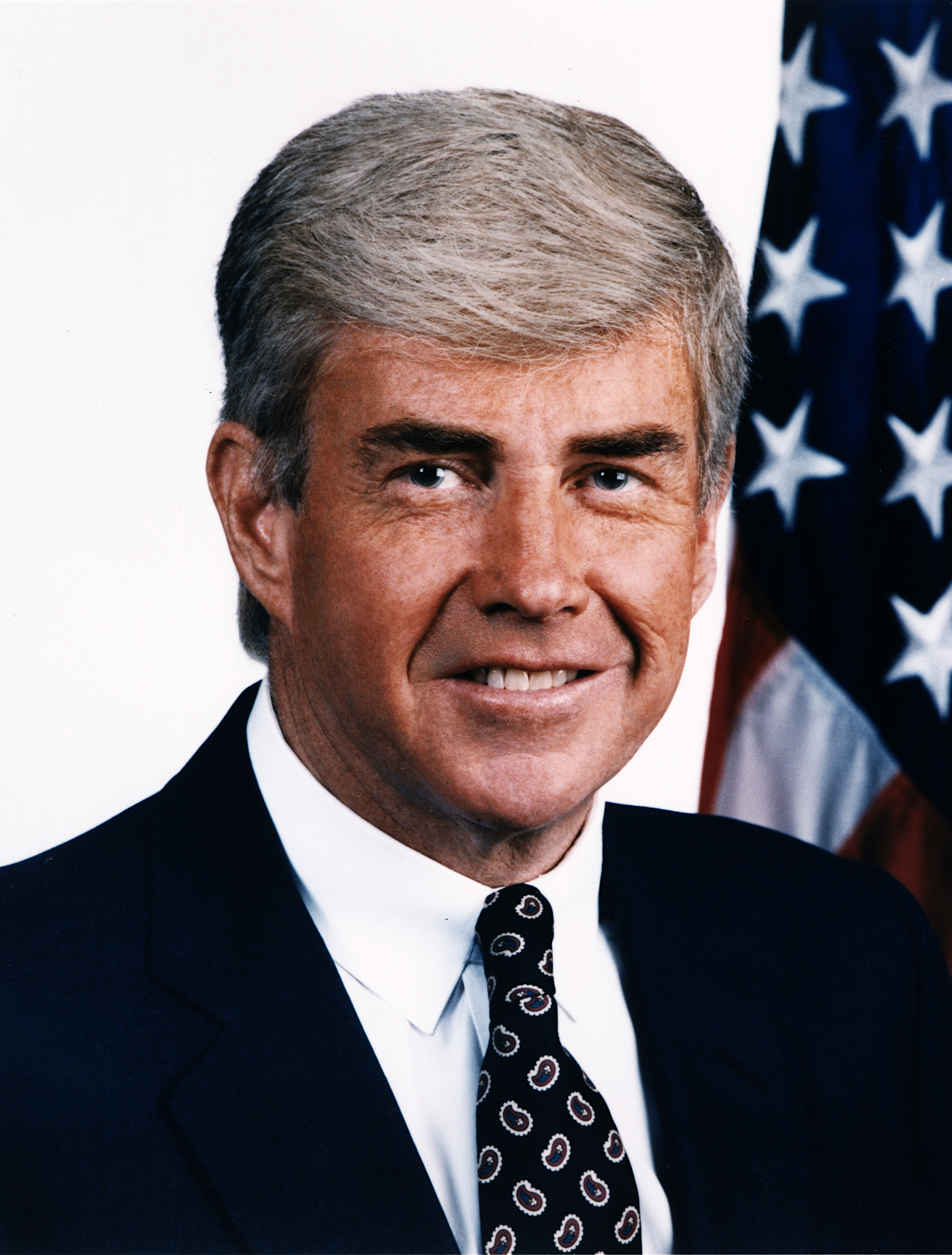
Jack Kemp, 9th U.S. Secretary of Housing and Urban Development and NFL player

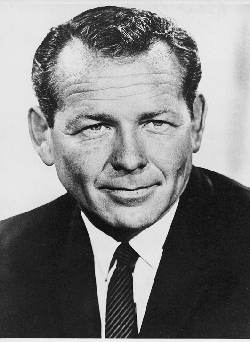
Robert Finch, 38th Lieutenant Governor of California

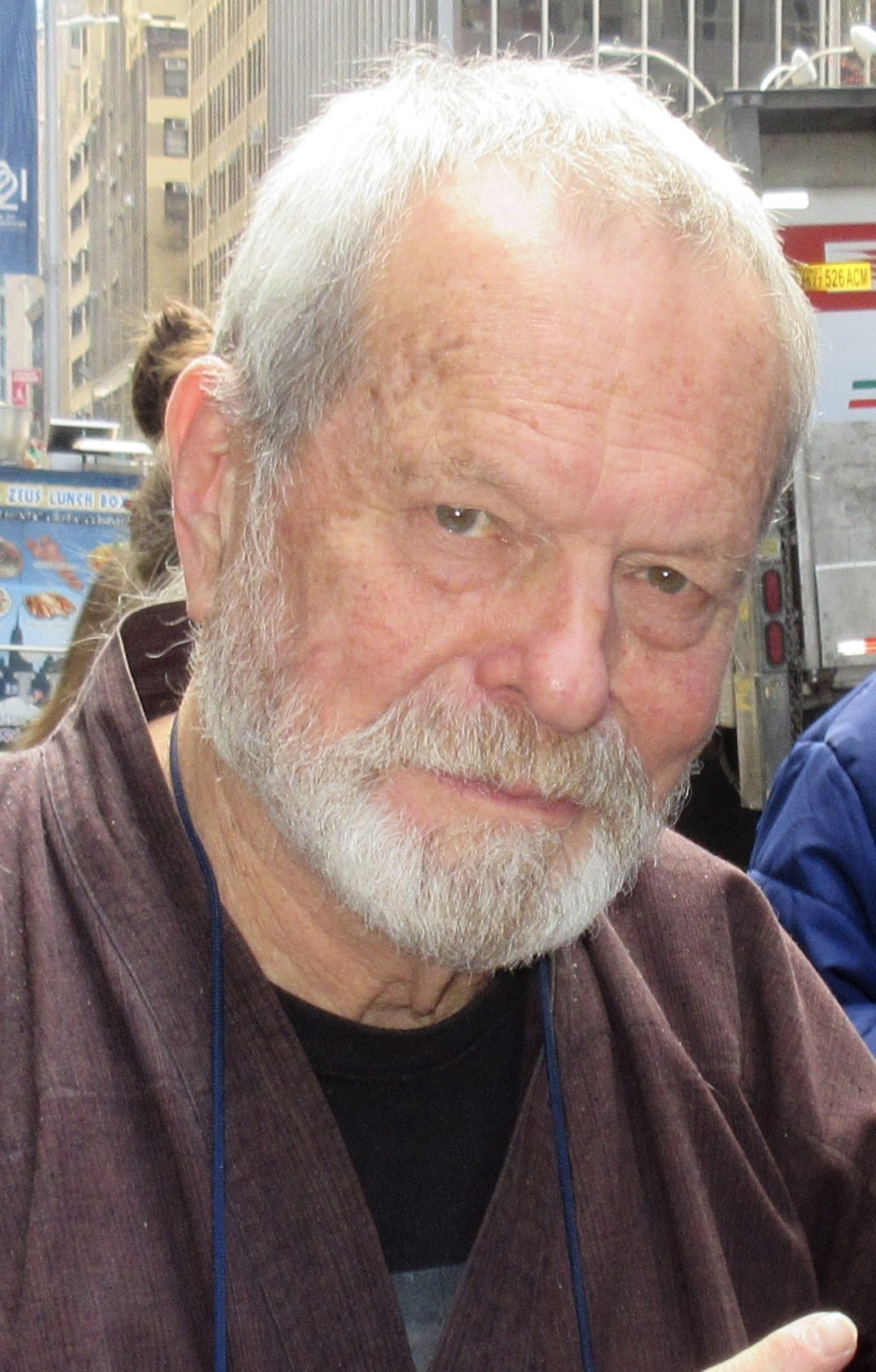
Terry Gilliam, BAFTA-winning filmmaker and former member of Monty Python

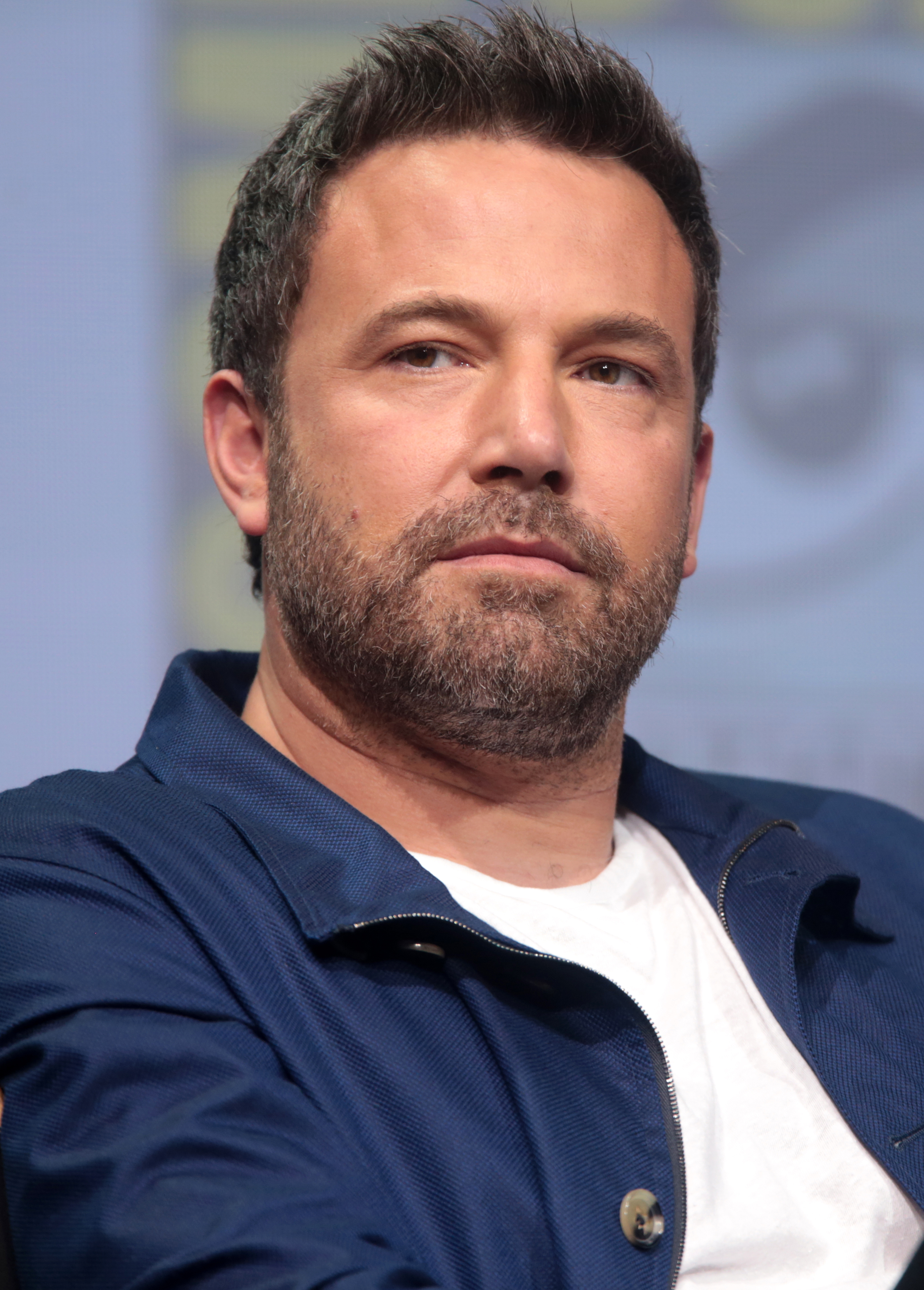
Ben Affleck, actor and Academy Award-winning filmmaker (dropped out)

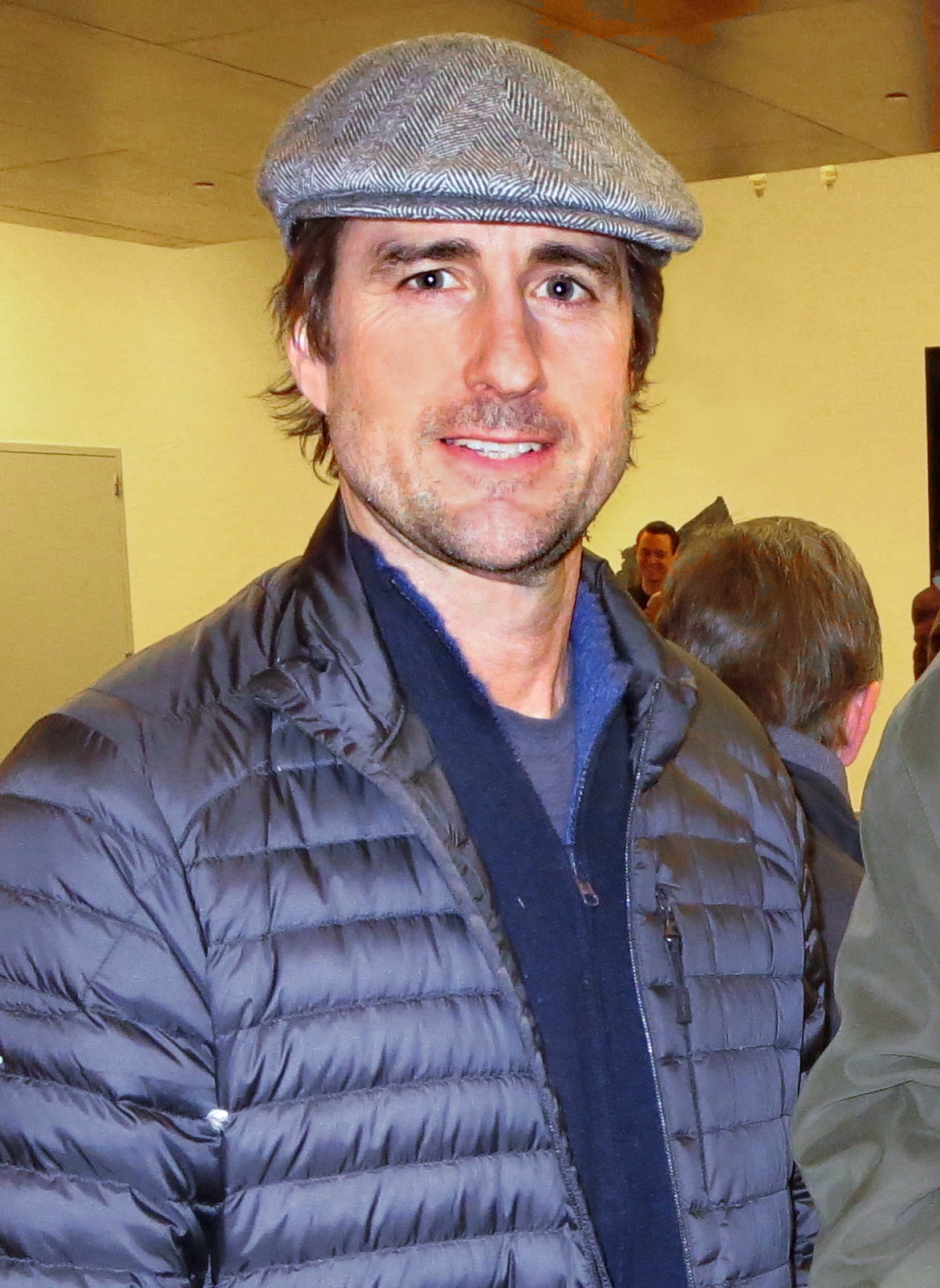
Luke Wilson, actor
(dropped out)

Notable graduates of Occidental College include filmmaker Terry Gilliam, football player and politician Jack Kemp, pioneering African-American physicist and inventor George Edward Alcorn Jr., former New Orleans Saints and Indianapolis Colts head coach Jim E. Mora, co-inventor of the hard disk drive William Goddard, psychopharmacologist and professor at Johns Hopkins School of Medicine Roland Griffiths, federal judge Jacqueline Nguyen, academic, film executive and novelist August Coppola, historian and chancellor of the California State University system Glenn Dumke, former Lieutenant Governor of California Robert Finch, adventurer and writer Homer Lea, poet Robinson Jeffers, librarian and writer Lawrence Clark Powell, entertainment journalist Sam Rubin, Tony Award-winning actress Joanna Gleason, civil rights activist Ernesto Galarza, television director Jesus Salvador Trevino, voice actress and internet personality Ashly Burch, entertainment executive John Branca, political scientist Eqbal Ahmad, journalist and current dean of Columbia University Graduate School of Journalism Steve Coll, actor and writer George Nader, veteran executive at Walt Disney Imagineering Joe Rohde, former CEO of Warner Music Group Stephen Cooper, President of Catholic University of America Peter Kilpatrick, Ambassador to Armenia and former chargé d'affaires to Ukraine during the 2022 Russian invasion of Ukraine Kristina Kvien, Dartmouth Professor Steve Swayne, and civil rights activist and initiator of "We Shall Overcome" Guy Carawan.

Notable alumni who did not graduate from Occidental include the 44th U.S. President Barack Obama, former First Lady of Colorado Dottie Lamm, Academy Award–winning actor and filmmaker Ben Affleck, actor Luke Wilson, actor Nicholas Braun, filmmaker and actor Cooper Raiff, producer Todd Garner, and actress Emily Osment.

Notable faculty members include the American urban policy analyst Peter Dreier, former U.S. Ambassador to Finland Derek Shearer, former CNN and Fox News contributor Caroline Heldman, chemist Frank L. Lambert, art historian and author Amy Lyford, and the 2005 PEN American Center Literary Award winner in poetry Martha Ronk.
