= The Glorious Cause: The American Revolution, 1763–1789 =

1982 American history book by Robert Middlekauff

- Revised edition cover
- Author: Robert Middlekauff
- Series: The Oxford History of the United States
- Genre: Narrative history
- Publisher: Oxford University Press
- Publication date: June 3, 1982 (original); February 1, 2005 (revised)
- Media type: Print (hardcover)
- Pages: 712
- ISBN: 0-19-502921-6
- Preceded by: Imperial America, 1672–1764 (planned; unreleased)
- Followed by: Empire of Liberty: A History of the Early Republic, 1789–1815

The Glorious Cause: The American Revolution, 1763–1789 is a nonfiction book about the American Revolution written by American historian Robert Middlekauff. Covering the history of the American Revolution from around 1760 through to the adoption of the Constitution of the United States, The Glorious Cause focuses mainly on the military history of the American Revolutionary War and on the leadership of Continental Army leader George Washington. Middlekauff writes with overt sympathy for the revolutionary cause. His detailed coverage of the war emphasizes its physical brutality.

First released as a clothbound hardcover in 1982, The Glorious Cause was the first volume to be published in the Oxford History of the United States series (though a chronologically prior volume about the colonial history of the United States was planned). Although editors C. Vann Woodward and Richard Hofstadter had embarked on the series in 1961, multiple other candidates to write the volume on the American Revolution fell through before Middlekauff was assigned to the task in the 1970s.

Multiple reviewers praised The Glorious Cause's style and readability, deeming it accessible to lay audiences and exciting to read. There were other assessments that were divided. Multiple reviewers criticized the absence of social history and the limited coverage of Loyalists, (Note: Loyalists were American colonists who supported the British Crown and country throughout the revolutionary period, from 1765 onward. There were Loyalists in all thirteen of the British North American colonies; they were most concentrated in New York and South Carolina.) women, American Indians, and Black people. There were others who averred that the book ably synthesized the scholarship on the American Revolution and praised it as an overall history of the period. Reviews described the book as a traditionalist reassertion of the Whig view of history (Note: Coined by the historian Herbert Butterfield, the Whig view of history refers to an interpretive approach that takes history as nearly always a narrative of progress that inevitably creates the conditions of the present.) or as a novel contribution to new developments in political and military history. The Glorious Cause was a finalist for the 1983 Pulitzer Prize.

In 2005, Oxford University Press published a revised edition of The Glorious Cause. The new edition contains more social history, including coverage of American Indians, Black people, Loyalists, and women, though it remains focused on politics, war, and constitutionalism. The Library Journal and The Atlantic praised the revised edition's narrative and style.

== Background ==
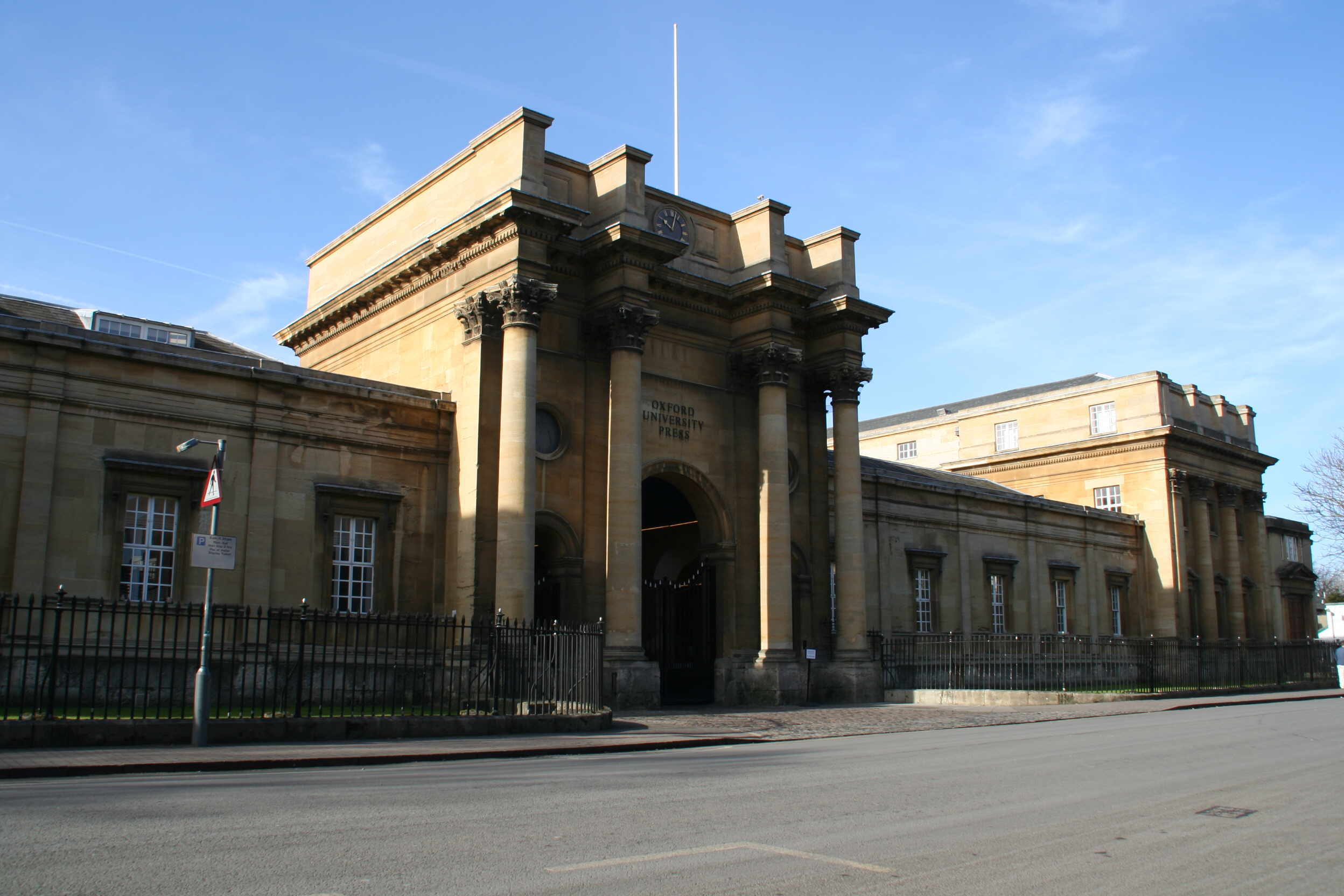
Oxford University Press, publisher of the Oxford History of the United States and of The Glorious Cause

Oxford University Press publishes multiple book series called "Oxford histories"; for the most part, these series are crafted to provide general syntheses rather than novel interpretations. (Note: Other examples of Oxford histories include the New Oxford History of England and the Oxford History of South Africa.) In 1961, historians C. Vann Woodward and Richard Hofstadter began coediting the Oxford History of the United States series together, though Hofstadter died before the series published any books. Woodward grew concerned that twentieth-century historical scholarship was overemphasizing analysis and losing touch with narrative, resultantly becoming fragmented as a discipline and disconnected from the interests of laypeople; he wanted the Oxford series to reassert the importance of narrative history and to reach the general public as an audience. In an introduction, Woodward attested that the series would synthesize the scholarship of "the latest generation of historians". By 1982, general syntheses had been out of fashion for years.

== Publication ==
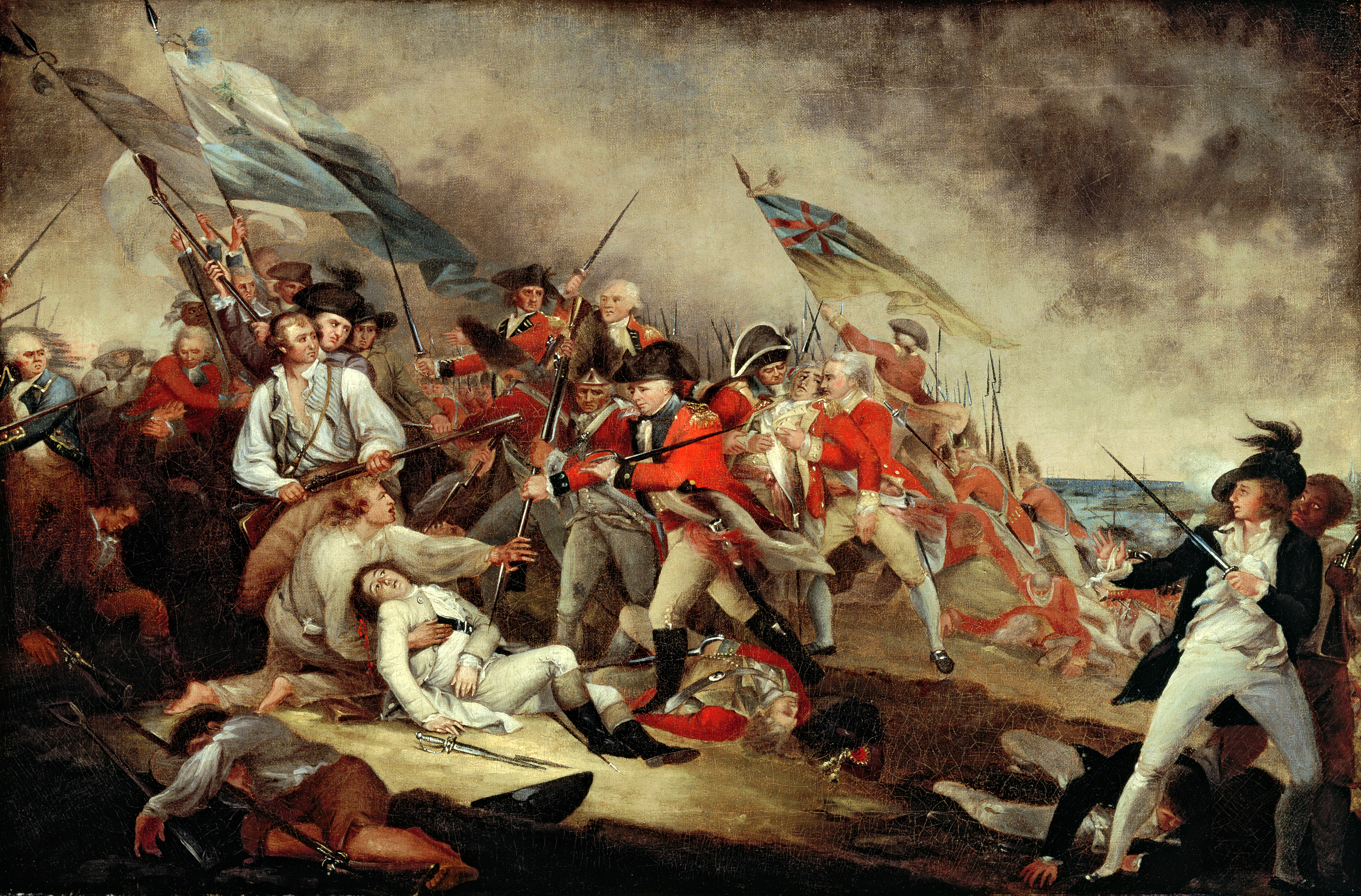
The Death of General Warren at the Battle of Bunker's Hill, June 17, 1775 by John Trumbull

Initially, Hofstadter and Woodward sought to persuade Bernard Bailyn to write the series' second volume, planned to cover the American Revolution. When they did not secure Bailyn as the volume's author, they contacted Merrill D. Peterson, and he formally agreed in 1964 to write the book, but stepped down from the task in 1967, saying he was becoming too old to do it. Merrill Jensen, who had initially agreed in 1962 to write what was then planned to be the series' first volume (on the colonial history of the United States) but had been asking to be switched to write about the American Revolution, was reassigned to replace Peterson. When Woodward asked Jensen about his progress as of December 1970, Jensen reported that he had made none and surmised the series might be better off with a new, younger scholar for the project, to which Woodward agreed, dropping Jensen from the series.

Woodward contacted historian Robert Middlekauff and signed him on to replace Jensen as writer of the series' volume on the American Revolution, making Middlekauff the third author the series had contacted for that task. Before writing for the Oxford History of the United States, Middlekauff had been known as a specialist in colonial American history. He was the author of the 1963 Ancients and Axioms: Secondary Education in Eighteenth-Century New England and the 1971 The Mathers: Three Generations of Puritan Intellectuals, 1596–1728.

Oxford University Press published the first edition of The Glorious Cause in 1982 as a 712-page-long clothbound hardcover. On release, The Glorious Cause sold for $25 (USD, equivalent to $83 in 2025) or £15 (GBP, equivalent to $53 in 2025). It was the first volume to be published as part of its series. At the time of its publication, The Glorious Cause was presented as the second volume in a projected eleven-volume series, with an unreleased but planned volume expected to address the American continent's history before 1763. Later, the series planned to produce two volumes on history before 1763 (The Glorious Cause will be the third volume chronologically). As of 2011, the chronologically second volume of the series was planned to be Imperial America, 1672–1764.

To mark the release of the Oxford History of the United States' first volume, series editor Woodward wrote an essay published in the New York Times Book Review defending the practice of narrative history. Titled "A Short History of American History", Woodward's essay averred that historians since the 1960s had neglected nonspecialist readers as an audience and insisted the field had "the duty and privilege, unlike scholars of other disciplines", to write "in readable, unspecialized prose that [laypeople] can understand and enjoy".

== Content ==
The Glorious Cause: The American Revolution, 1763–1789 is a single-volume narrative history of the American Revolution. It begins with the general state of British North America in 1760, and it ends with the making and establishing of the Constitution of the United States. (Note: The United States' second constitution, the U. S. Constitution was created by a 1787 Constitutional Convention to replace the country's first constitution, the Articles of Confederation, on the grounds that the national government created by the latter was unable to meet the needs of postwar governance (particularly for what constitutional proponents perceived as failures in foreign affairs and national solvency). The Constitution replaced the Articles of Confederation and went into effect in 1788.) Middlekauff explicitly notes that his title is not meant "as irony", and he writes as "an American patriot", in the words of historian Carl Bridenbaugh, whose sympathies lie with those American colonists who were in revolt.

The book divides into roughly three parts; somewhat less than half of the book treats the estrangement of the American colonies from Great Britain, about 250 pages on the American Revolutionary War follow, and the final 80 pages treat the challenges of governance with the Articles of Confederation (Note: Also called the Articles of Confederation and Perpetual Union, this document was the United States' first constitution, endorsed by the Continental Congress in November 1777, fully ratified by all thirteen states by March 1781, and in effect until the adoption of the U. S. Constitution in 1788. Under the Articles of Confederation, each state had a single vote in a unicameral national legislature which had the authority to levy taxes.) and the adoption of the Constitution. About a third of the book focuses on military history. In a review, Bridenbaugh argued that Middlekauff's approach made military history "the central theme" of the era. The leadership of George Washington, commander of the revolutionaries' Continental Army, is emphasized "above all", according to reviewer E. B. Van Heyningen. Historian Richard D. Brown summed up the book's "main theme [a]s that of George Washington and his associates winning the war and the peace". The chapters covering the war emphasize an American perspective on the conflict. The Glorious Cause does not address the war's western front. Its depiction of the war emphasizes its brutality, highlighting atrocities committed by both sides in the conflict, including those directed against non-combatants.

The Glorious Cause characterizes the American revolutionaries as having been widely influenced by fervent Protestantism, portrays the Founding Fathers as having been pious and providentialist, (Note: Particularly in early modernity, Protestant Christians commonly believed in providence, the idea that world events are influenced or even directed by the creator God in which they believed.) and avers that their ancestors were religiously motivated to leave England to establish a new society in North America. In the words of reviewer Morgan Dederer, Middlekauff "perceives the American colonist's [sic] break with Great Britain almost as a religious event couched in philosophical/political terms".

The book includes illustrations (all but one of which are portraits), maps of battles, a five-and-a-half-page bibliographic essay, and an index. The first edition's dust jacket bears artist John Trumbull's painting The Death of General Warren at the Battle of Bunker's Hill, June 17, 1775.

== Reception ==
=== Accessibility ===
Bridenbaugh called The Glorious Cause "richly detailed, readable, and rewarding" and praised its "lively, if colloquial, style that will please most American readers". Historian Jack P. Greene praised the book's readability, summing up that the "style is lively, the narrative flow rapid, and the scholarly analysis unobtrusive". In her book review, historian Mary Beth Norton wrote that The Glorious Cause is written to be "accessible to the general public". Historian William W. Freehling noted the book's affordability for everyday consumers, averring that its price "will not dent the family budget horridly".

=== Storytelling ===
Reviewer W. Stitt Robinson praised Middlekauff for "skillfully weav[ing] an exciting story". Historian Ann Gorman Condon considered the detailed coverage of "[m]ob scenes, battle tactics, Washington's leadership qualities" the book's "superb moments". According to historian Don Higginbotham, "the story moves, especially in descriptions of the smoke and din of battle when the narrative become fast-paced and sometimes exciting". Literature professor Robert Reynolds wrote that although Middlekauff "is a very intelligent writer" with "interesting views and judgments which he backs up effectively", the book is challenging to read, as The Glorious Cause on multiple occasions presents events and figures without reminding readers of what or who they are, and occasionally without introducing them at all.

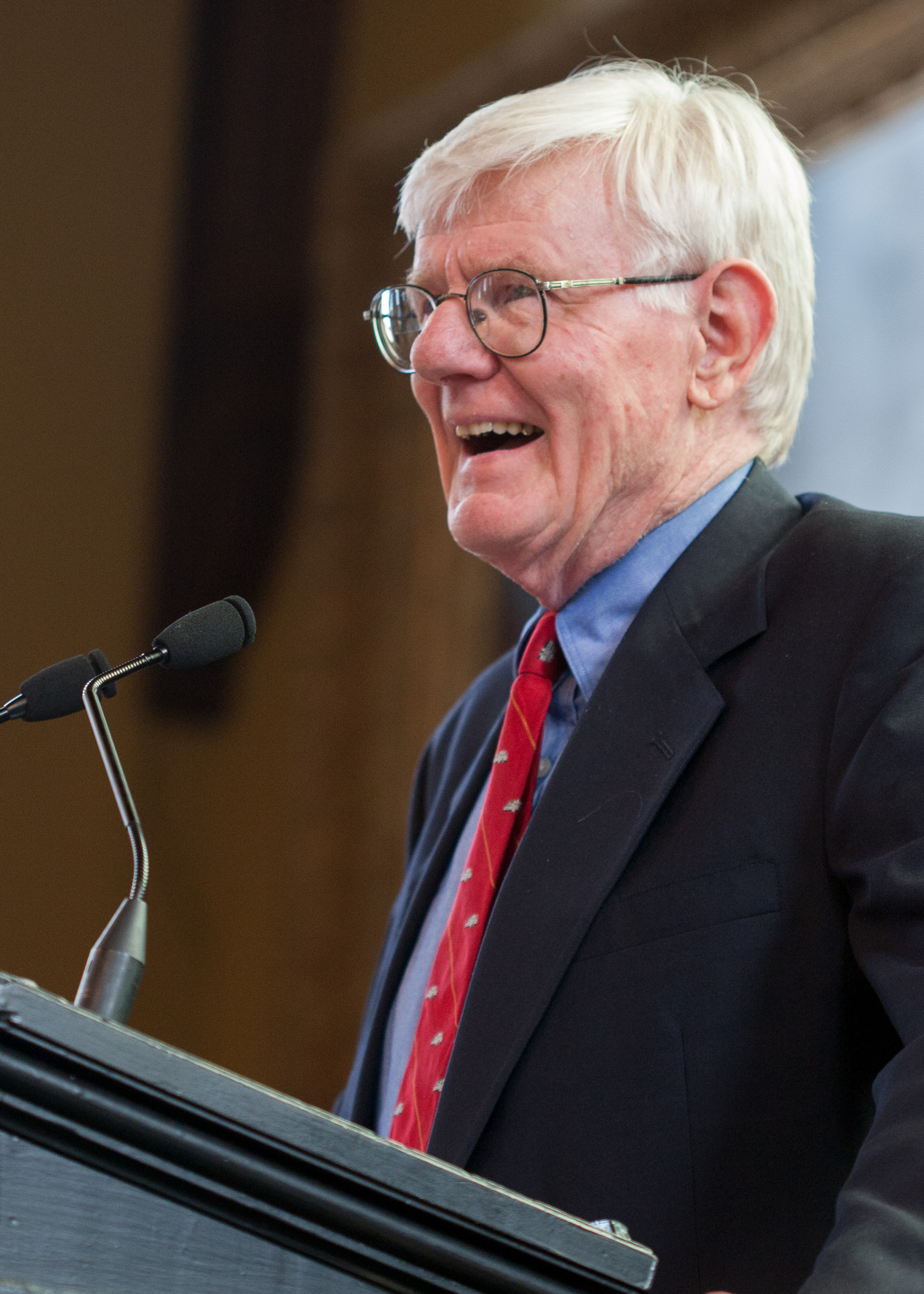
Gordon S. Wood wrote a critical review of The Glorious Cause in 1982 and recommended it to Five Books readers in 2020.

Gordon S. Wood, who had agreed in 1982 to write the chronologically next volume in the series (covering United States history from 1789 to 1815), wrote what historian James C. Cobb called a "sharply critical" review of The Glorious Cause in the New York Review of Books which called into question whether traditional narrative history was a valid method. Oxford University Press editor Sheldon Meyer suspected that Wood's review of The Glorious Cause partly motivated the 1985 departure from the series of T. H. Breen, who had agreed as early as 1970 to write the volume on the colonial era.

=== Coverage ===
According to Greene, as an academic synthesis The Glorious Cause lacks balance because it "ignores several of the more important interpretive problems raised by […] scholarship". Norton argued that "professional historians will probably be more than a little disappointed". Reviewer G. C. Gibbs wrote that the book's relative inattention to the colonial and transatlantic economies as well as to world history was "to be regretted", and he criticized the unsympathetic coverage of British imperial policy, arguing that the book tended to depict British ministers as inflexible "to the point of political insanity". Richard D. Brown and Wallace Brown criticized The Glorious Cause for only marginally covering the topic of Loyalism. Reviewer Sydney V. James criticized the cursory treatment of the postwar period after the Siege of Yorktown, stating that the remaining events "tumble down in a rush" and that of such topics, "the Confederation period gets the poorest treatment". Greene concurred that The Glorious Cause's coverage of the Articles of Confederation did not adequately synthesize the scholarship then current. Gibbs considered The Glorious Cause a "seriously disappointing work" because of making numerous "faults of commission and omission".

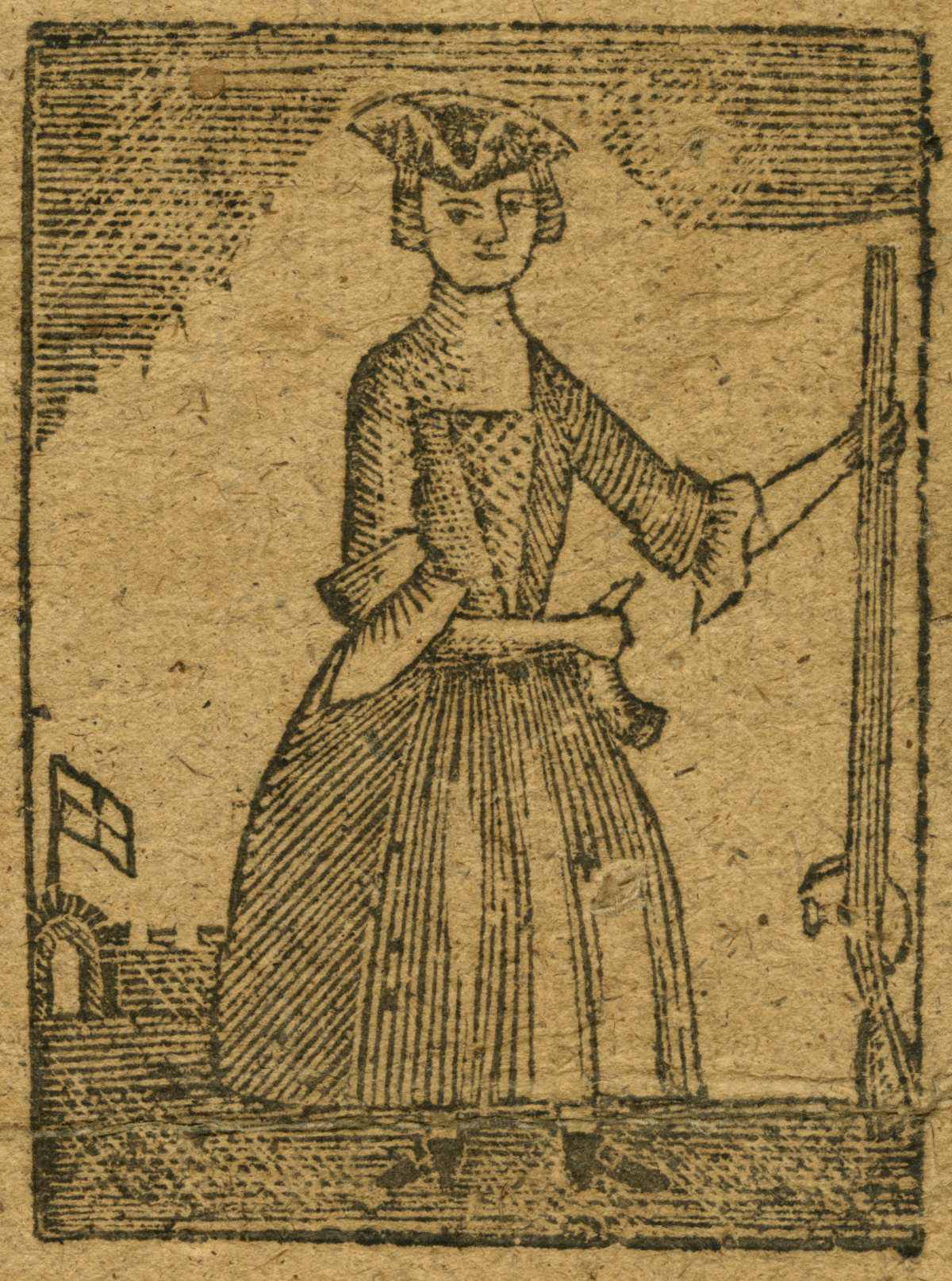
Some reviewers criticized The Glorious Cause for its marginal treatment of women's history.

Richard D. Brown also criticized Middlekauff for giving minimal attention to social history and women's history and for misrepresenting the history of slavery in the United States, such as in the inaccurate claim that the southern states cooperated with the northern states to abolish traffic in enslaved people. The Glorious Cause addresses women's history less than twenty-five times. There are only three pages about African Americans in the Revolutionary War, covering a small number of Black people who escaped enslavement by Patriot colonists and joined the British between 1775 and 1776, with Norton criticizing The Glorious Cause for leaving out "the many thousands more who flocked to the British standard between 1778 and 1781". According to historians Robinson, Wallace Brown, and Kristofer Ray, The Glorious Cause is inattentive to the role and experiences of Native Americans, such as the Cherokee and Haudenosaunee.

Greene suspected that Middlekauff intentionally disobeyed the series instruction to write a comprehensive synthesis to instead write a "personal reading of the Revolutionary experience", a choice that Greene called a "wise decision" because of the historiography's complexity; in Greene's assessment, The Glorious Cause still "will both appeal to nonspecialists and repay the close attention of scholars". Acknowledging the book "is more concerned with such traditional topics as government, politics, and war" than with topics of social history, reviewer George William Pilcher assessed The Glorious Cause as "a first rate work of historical synthesis" and argued that it "has not ignored the interweaving of social and political events". Historian I. R. Christie called The Glorious Cause "a fine general account which will justly rank as a standard work". Robinson praised Middlekauff for "appropriate use of much of the latest historical research in this field" and considered The Glorious Cause a "commendable blend of the work of other scholars with his own research". John E. Selby called The Glorious Cause a "traditional comprehensive work" that "incorporate[s] the newer insights" of the field of American revolutionary history.

According to Condon, the first and third sections—covering the lead-up to the war for independence and the postwar period—are unbalanced and flawed but the second section, focused on military history, is "full of solid information and good insights": Middlekauff "skillfully assesse[s]" both sides' military commanders, sympathetically captures the human experience of the conflict, and thickly details the life of "the common soldier: his recruitment, training, life in camp, medical attention, wives and mistresses, and abiding loneliness". According to Trevor Burnard in 2011, The Glorious Cause focuses on war too much, distorting the history of the period.

=== Religion ===
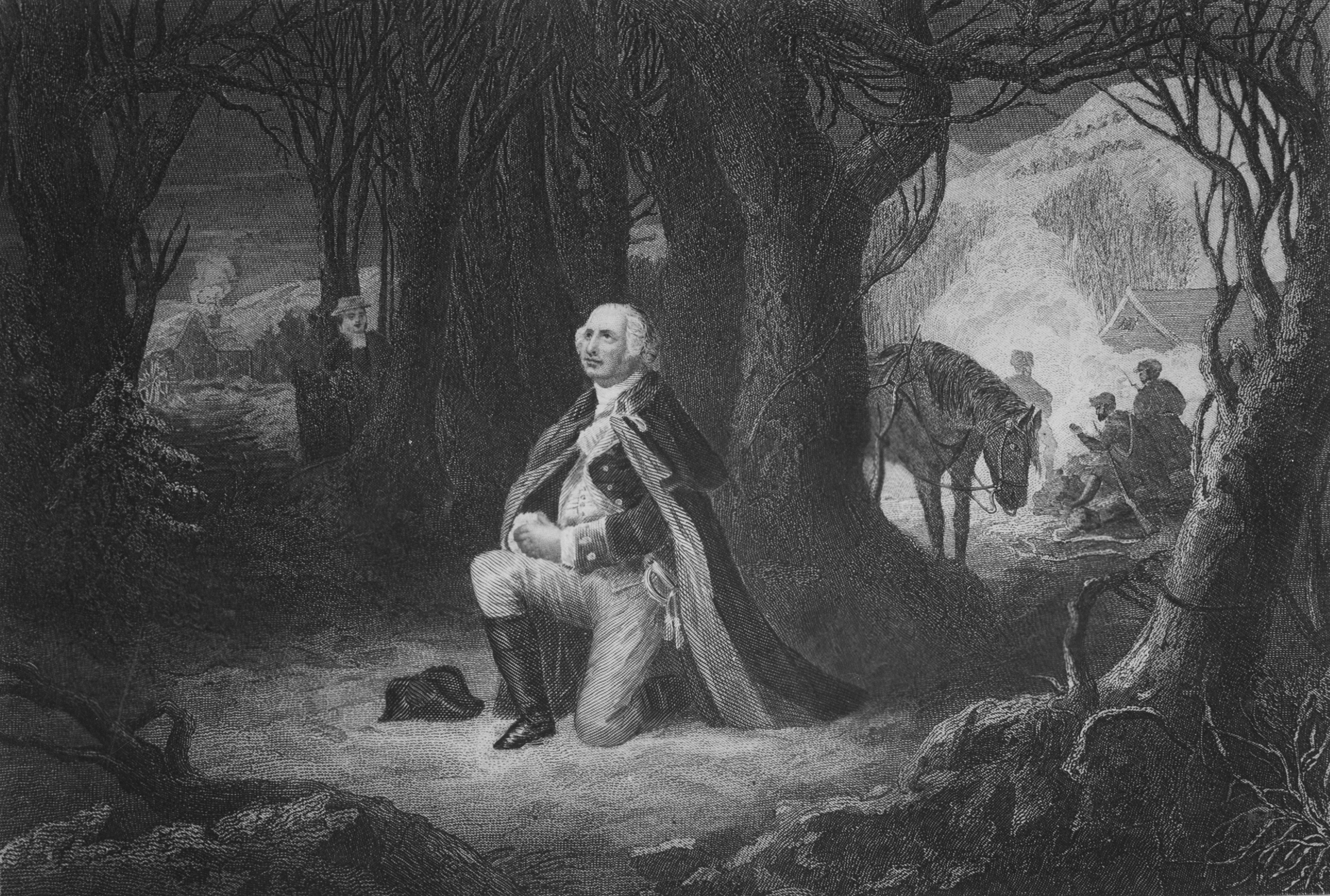
Middlekauff argued that religious motives played a significant role in the American Revolution.

At the time of The Glorious Cause's publication, Gibbs and Robinson praised the novelty of Middlekauff's argument that religion played a major role in motivating the American Revolution. Higginbotham's review averred that the book's "religious theme has interesting possibilities" but Middlekauff did not sufficiently integrate it with the narrative after 1775. Burnard criticized Middlekauff's depiction of religion and noted that the chronologically next volume in the series, Empire of Liberty: A History of the Early Republic, 1789–1815 (published in 2009), depicts the Founding Fathers as having been "noticeably irreligious" rather than pious.

=== Perspective ===
Norton characterized The Glorious Cause as being a "standard political-constitutional-military account of the Revolution that could have appeared a decade ago nearly in its present form", because it overemphasizes colonial elites and New England, depicting the American Revolution as a movement "from the top down rather than the bottom up", contrary to scholarship that identified the "dynamic uncertainty of the prewar and war years". According to James, The Glorious Cause mentions but deemphasizes socioeconomic clashes among American colonists, carrying on a "patriotic tradition" of history that makes "Loyalists seem innately to have been aliens in their own land". Higginbotham argued that in The Glorious Cause Middlekauff is "aware of divisions within American society".

In his review, Richard D. Brown called The Glorious Cause "an up-to-date restatement of the Whig view". Higginbotham considered The Glorious Cause "reasonably compatible with the neo-whig or consensus" schools of thought that emphasized disastrous British policy, deemphasized economic history, and centered the Revolutionary War. Historian Kristofer Ray argued that The Glorious Cause was part of a Cold War-era historiography shaped "by neo-Whig insistence" on the "inevitability of American independence". Burnard called The Glorious Cause a "neo-Whig book" and averred that Middlekauff "virtually ignores" historical scholarship that argues the Revolution and Constitution were controversial and divided early Americans. Condon criticized the book as having an "outworn, nostalgic interpretation" and called it "at bottom a romance" in which George Washington and the revolutionaries are heroes, the "villains are the wicked British ministry", and the Revolutionary War is inevitable. Pilcher considered Middlekauff's approach "far from traditional, emphasizing as it does, the best of the 'new' military and political history".

=== Honors ===
The Glorious Cause was a finalist for the 1983 Pulitzer Prize. In a 2020 interview, Gordon S. Wood included The Glorious Cause in a list of books about the Fourth of July that he recommended to Five Books readers and called it "one of the best accounts" of the Revolutionary War. A 2021 New York Times obituary for Middlekauff reported that he was "best known" for having written The Glorious Cause, "considered one of the best one-volume histories of the American Revolution".

== Revised edition ==
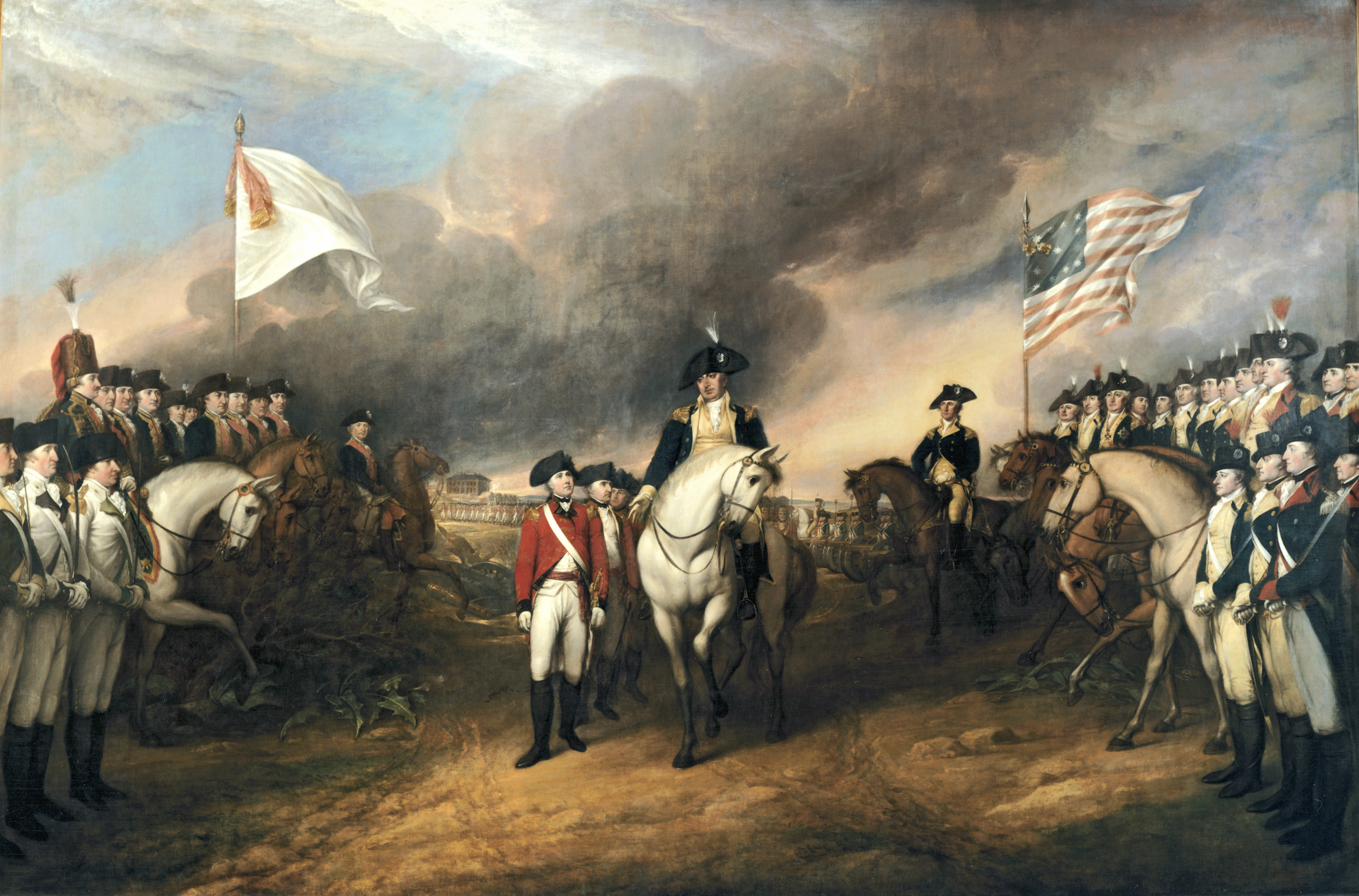
Surrender of Lord Cornwallis by John Trumbull (1820)

In 2005, Oxford University Press published a revised edition of The Glorious Cause. The revised edition includes additional content about the experience and participation of women, American Indians, enslaved people, and Loyalists during the American Revolution, more coverage of riots against British measures prior to 1776, an updated bibliographic essay, and a new epilogue. Most of the new material is social history, though the book's overall focus remains on political, military, and constitutional history. It is approximately 800 pages long and on release sold for $40 (USD, equivalent to $66 in 2025). Kathleen M. Lynch designed the front cover, which bears American painter John Trumbull's 1820 artwork, Surrender of Lord Cornwallis.

=== Revised edition's reception ===
Reviewing it for the Library Journal, librarian Robert Flatley considered the revised edition "narrative history at its best, written in a conversational and engaging style" and recommended it for libraries seeking a "single-volume, up-to-date history of the Revolutionary period". The Island Packet considered the revised edition an "ambitious book" of "fascinating history". Atlantic literary editor Benjamin Schwarz called it "the best one-volume history of the American Revolution, and among the best narrative American histories of the past half century".
