= Robert Middlekauff =

American historian (1929–2021)

5th Director of the Huntington Library
- In office September 1, 1983 – December 31, 1987
- Preceded by: James Thorpe
- Succeeded by: Robert Skotheim; Martin Ridge (interim)

Personal details
- Born: July 5, 1929 Yakima, Washington
- Died: March 10, 2021 (aged 91) Pleasanton, California

Academic work
- Discipline: History
- Sub-discipline: Colonial and early US history
- Institutions: Huntington Library; UC Berkeley

Robert Lawrence Middlekauff (July 5, 1929 – March 10, 2021) was a professor of colonial and early United States history at the University of California, Berkeley.

== Career ==
In 1983, Middlekauff became the Director (Note: The title for the Huntington Library chief executive was changed from "Director" to "President" in 1988.) of Huntington Library, Art Collections and Botanical Gardens in San Marino, California, until 1987. He was elected to the American Academy of Arts and Sciences in 1984. In 1987, Middlekauff became a professor at UC Berkeley.

Middlekauff is best known for The Glorious Cause, a history of the American Revolutionary War, which was a finalist for the Pulitzer Prize in 1983. He was the Harold Vyvyan Harmsworth Professor of American History in 1996–97. In 1997, he was elected to the American Philosophical Society in 1997.

== Personal life ==
He was born in Yakima, Washington. Middlekauff died at the age of 91 from complications of a stroke on March 10, 2021, in Pleasanton, California.

== See also ==
- Historiography of the United States

== Bibliography ==
- Ancients and Axioms: Secondary Education in Eighteenth-Century New England (New Haven: Yale University Press, 1963).
- The Mathers: Three Generations of Puritan Intellectuals, 1596-1728, winner of the Bancroft Prize. (Oxford: Oxford University Press, 1971) reprinted in paperback (Berkeley: University of California Press, 1999).
- The Glorious Cause: The American Revolution, 1763–1789 (Oxford: Oxford University Press, 1982, paperback ed., 1986) (Revised and Expanded Edition, 2005, ISBN 978-0-19-516247-9).
- Benjamin Franklin and His Enemies (Berkeley: University of California Press, 1996; paperback ed., 1998).

== Notes ==
Academic offices
Preceded by James Thorpe	5th Director of Huntington Library; 1983 – 1987	Succeeded by Robert Skotheim; Martin Ridge (interim)
