= Susan Westerberg Prager =

American legal scholar and administrator

11th Dean of Southwestern Law School
- In office 2013–2021

Personal details
- Born: Susan Ann Westerberg; December 14, 1942 (age 83) Sacramento, California, U.S.
- Known for: First woman President of Occidental College

Susan Westerberg Prager (born December 14, 1942) is an American legal scholar and administrator. Prager served as the 11th Dean and President of Southwestern Law School for eight years from 2013 to 2021, and was the first woman in the history of the law school to serve in the post.

== Early life ==
On December 14, 1942, Prager was born in Sacramento, California. Prager grew up in Sloughhouse, California, a small agricultural community.

== Education ==
In 1964, Prager earned her B.A. degree in history from Stanford University. Prager also earned an M.A. degree in history from Stanford University. She received her J.D. degree from UCLA and was editor-in-chief of the UCLA Law Review.

== Career ==
Before leading Southwestern Law School, Prager served as the sixth Executive Director and CEO of the Association of American Law Schools for six years. Prior to her service at the AALS, Prager was the provost of Dartmouth College.

From 1982 through 1998, Prager was the dean of the UCLA School of Law, giving her the longest tenure of any dean in UCLA Law history. Prager was the 13th President and the first woman President at Occidental College.

In 1982, Prager became the first female dean of a law school in the UC system and only one of two female law school deans in the country. When Prager left her deanship in 1998, the law school established a faculty chair in her name. In addition, during her tenure at UCLA, Prager became the second woman to serve as the president of the Association of American Law Schools.

Prager served for 14 years as a trustee of Stanford University during which time she served as the Vice President of the Board and she chaired the board's Academic Policy Committee. Prager also worked for U.S. Senator Thomas Kuchel of California, the minority whip in the Senate from 1959-1969, and for members of the U.S. House of Representatives, and the California State Assembly. She practiced law at Powe, Porter & Alphin in Durham, North Carolina before returning to the UCLA School of Law faculty, where she focused on family law, community property, and historic preservation law.

== Personal life ==
Prager's husband is Jim Prager. They have two daughters.

== See also ==
- Occidental College
