= Jonathan Veitch =

American academic

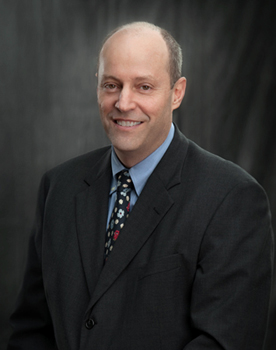
- Veitch in 2009

15th President of Occidental College
- In office 2009–2020
- Preceded by: Robert Skotheim
- Succeeded by: Harry J. Elam, Jr.

Personal details
- Born: January 31, 1959 (age 67) Los Angeles, California, United States
- Spouse: Sarah Veitch (after 1992)
- Children: 3
- Parent(s): Carol Lee (mother); John Veitch (father)
- Relatives: Alan Ladd (step-grandfather)
- Education: Stanford University; Harvard University
- Website: www.oxy.edu/faculty/jonathan-veitch

Jonathan Veitch (born 1959) is an American college administrator, author and former professor. He was the 15th President of Occidental College in Los Angeles, California. He became president in July 2009, succeeding interim president Robert Skotheim and ended his term in June 2020, followed by president Harry J. Elam Jr. Veitch previously served as a professor at the University of Wisconsin and dean of The New School's Eugene Lang College. He authored American Superrealism: Nathanael West and the Politics of Representation in the 1930s in 1997.

== Early life and education ==
Jonathan Veitch was born and raised in Los Angeles, California. His father, John Veitch, was the president of Columbia Pictures' worldwide productions, and his step-grandfather was actor Alan Ladd.

Veitch attended Loyola High School in southern California before he received his bachelor's degree from Stanford University in English and American Literature. He later received his doctoral degree in the History of American Civilization from Harvard University.

== Career ==
In 1993, Veitch became an associate professor of English at the University of Wisconsin. The University of Wisconsin Press published his first book, American Superrealism: Nathanael West and the Politics of Representation in the 1930s, in 1997. That same year, Veitch moved to New York and became an associate professor at The New School, teaching courses in cultural history, American history and American film pertaining to the nineteenth and twentieth centuries.

Veitch was named Dean of Eugene Lang College in 2004, where he remained for a tenure of four years before stepping down and becoming the president of Occidental College in 2009.

Veitch was elected to RMR Group Board of Directors in summer 2020.

== Occidental College ==
Veitch is the first president of Occidental College to be a native Angeleno, having been born in Los Angeles. He succeeded Robert Skotheim as the fifteenth president of the college on June 30, 2009. Veitch has worked to improve relations between the College and the surrounding community, limiting expansion of the campus into the community in response to neighborhood concerns.

On his first anniversary at the college in August 2010, Veitch hosted a public forum for Los Angeles activists and local officials to discuss the city's environmental future. He also brought on Ella Turenne as the college's assistant dean of civic engagement.

Veitch announced the new name of Occidental's football stadium in 2011, which was renamed after alumnus Jack Kemp, former professional football player, Secretary of Housing and Urban Development and Republican in the U.S. House of Representatives. Veitch also unveiled a new statue for the former student who died in 2009.

After a two-year consultative process initiated by Veitch, Occidental approved a five-year strategic plan in 2012 that laid out goals such as curricular innovation and fostering a cosmopolitan campus culture. On the school's 125th anniversary in April 2012, President Veitch announced that Occidental would be the recipient of a $5 million donation to renovate Johnson Hall, one of three original buildings on the campus.

During Veitch’s tenure, Occidental implemented new programs in computer science, media arts and culture, music production, and Black studies. In April 2013, Veitch unveiled a 1 megawatt solar array on the Occidental campus, to generate a portion of the campus's energy supply.

In September 2017, Veitch announced the creation of the Barack Obama Scholars Program, a four-year scholarship program aimed at exceptional students with an emphasis on first-generation students, veterans, and community college transfers who "want to contribute to the public good." Veitch has publicly supported the federal Deferred Action for Childhood Arrivals (DACA) program. Partnering with the lobbyist group Association of Independent California Colleges and Universities, Veitch helped to organize a March 2017 symposium that brought participants from more than 40 Southern California institutions to Occidental to consider how to respond to changes in immigration policy.

== Personal life ==
Veitch married Sarah Ann Baxter Kersh, the former director of international licensing and distribution for Calvin Klein, in December 1992.

== See also ==
- Occidental College
