= Bibliography of Jimmy Carter =

Books by and about the U.S. president

External videos
- Booknotes interview with Jimmy Carter on Always a Reckoning, February 19, 1995, C-SPAN

Books about and authored by Jimmy Carter, the 39th president of the United States (1977–1981).

== Books and scholarly articles about Carter ==
- Allen, Gary (1976). Jimmy Carter, Jimmy Carter. '76 Press. ISBN 0-89245-006-1.
- Alter, Jonathan (2020). His Very Best: Jimmy Carter, a Life. New York: Simon & Schuster.
- Auten, Brian J. (2008). Carter's Conversion: The Hardening of American Defense Policy. Columbia, Missouri: University of Missouri Press. ISBN 978-0826266491.
- Berggren, D. Jason; Rae, Nicol C. (2006). "Jimmy Carter and George W. Bush: Faith, Foreign Policy, and an Evangelical Presidential Style". Presidential Studies Quarterly. 36 (4): 606–632. doi:10.1111/j.1741-5705.2006.02570.x. ISSN 0360-4918.
- Bird, Kai (2021). The Outlier: The Unfinished Presidency of Jimmy Carter. New York: Crown Publishing Group. ISBN 978-0-451-49523-5.
- Bourne, Peter G. (1997). Jimmy Carter: A Comprehensive Biography From Plains to Post-Presidency. New York: Scribner. ISBN 0-684-19543-7.
- Brinkley, Douglas (1996). "The Rising Stock of Jimmy Carter: The "Hands on" Legacy of Our Thirty-ninth President". Diplomatic History. 20 (4): 505–530. doi:10.1111/j.1467-7709.1996.tb00285.x. ISSN 0145-2096. JSTOR 24913317.
- ——————— (1998). The Unfinished Presidency: Jimmy Carter's Journey Beyond the White House. New York: Penguin Books. ISBN 0-14-027616-5.
- Busch, Andrew E. (2005). Reagan's Victory: The Presidential Election of 1980 and the Rise of the Right. Lawrence: University Press of Kansas.
- Carleton, David, and Michael Stohl. "The foreign policy of human rights: Rhetoric and reality from Jimmy Carter to Ronald Reagan." Human Rights Quarterly 7 (1985): 205–229 online.
- Clymer, Kenton (2003). "Jimmy Carter, Human Rights, and Cambodia". Diplomatic History. 27 (2): 245–278. doi:10.1111/1467-7709.00349. ISSN 0145-2096.
- Dumbrell, John (1995). The Carter Presidency: A Re-Evaluation. Manchester: Manchester University Press. ISBN 0-7190-3617-8.
- Eizenstat, Stuart E. (2018). President Carter: The White House Years. New York: Thomas Dunne Books. ISBN 978-1-2501-0455-7. (Although Eizenstat was Carter's domestic affairs advisor, this book is a history of the Carter presidency rather than a memoir)
- Fink, Gary M.; Graham, Hugh Davis, eds. (1998). The Carter Presidency: Policy Choices in the Post-New Deal Era. Lawrence: University Press of Kansas. ISBN 0-7006-0895-8.
- Flint, Andrew R.; Porter, Joy (March 2005). "Jimmy Carter: The re-emergence of faith-based politics and the abortion rights issue". Presidential Studies Quarterly. 35 (1): 28–51. doi:10.1111/j.1741-5705.2004.00234.x.
- Freedman, Robert (2005). "The Religious Right and the Carter Administration". The Historical Journal. 48 (1): 231–260. doi:10.1017/S0018246X04004285. ISSN 0018-246X. S2CID 154791980.
- Frisch, Scott A.; Kelly, Sean Q. (2011). Jimmy Carter and the Water Wars: Presidential Influence and the Politics of Pork. Amherst, New York: Cambria Press. ISBN 978-1-60497-778-3.
- Gillon, Steven M. (1992). The Democrats' Dilemma: Walter F. Mondale and the Liberal Legacy. New York: Columbia University Press. ISBN 0-231-07630-4.
- Glad, Betty (1980). Jimmy Carter: In Search of the Great White House. New York: W. W. Norton. ISBN 0-393-33287-X.
- ————— (2009). An Outsider in the White House: Jimmy Carter, His Advisors, and the Making of American Foreign Policy. Ithaca: Cornell University Press. ISBN 978-0-8014-4815-7.
- Godbold, E. Stanly Jr. (2010). Jimmy and Rosalynn Carter: The Georgia Years, 1924–1974. New York: Oxford University Press. ISBN 978-0-19-977962-8.
- ————————— (2022). Jimmy and Rosalynn Carter: Power and Human Rights, 1975-2020. New York: Oxford University Press. ISBN 978-0-19-758156-8.
- Hahn, Dan F. (1992). "The rhetoric of Jimmy Carter, 1976–1980". In Windt, Theodore; Ingold, Beth (eds.). Essays in Presidential Rhetoric (3rd ed.). Dubuque, Iowa: Kendall/Hunt. pp. 331–365. ISBN 0-8403-7568-9.
- Hargrove, Erwin C. (1988). Jimmy Carter as President: Leadership and the Politics of the Public Good. Baton Rouge, Louisiana: Louisiana State University Press. ISBN 0-8071-2425-7.
- Harris, David (2004). The Crisis: The President, the Prophet, and the Shah – 1979 and the Coming of Militant Islam. Little, Brown and Company.
- Jagoda, Barry (2020). Journeys with Jimmy Carter and other Adventures in Media. Virginia Beach: Koehler Books. ISBN 978-1-64663-033-2.
- Jensehaugen, Jørgen (2018). Arab-Israeli Diplomacy Under Carter: The US, Israel and the Palestinians. London: I. B. Tauris. ISBN 978-1-78831-052-9.
- Jones, Charles O. (1988). The Trusteeship Presidency: Jimmy Carter and the United States Congress. Baton Rouge, Louisiana: Louisiana State University Press. ISBN 0-8071-1426-X.
- Jorden, William J. (1984). Panama Odyssey. Austin: University of Texas Press. ISBN 0-292-76469-3.
- Kaufman, Burton I.; Kaufman, Scott (2006). The Presidency of James Earl Carter. Lawrence: University Press of Kansas. ISBN 0-7006-1471-0.
- Kaufman, Scott (2008). Plans Unraveled: The Foreign Policy of the Carter Administration. DeKalb, Illinois: Northern Illinois University Press. ISBN 978-0-87580-390-6.
- Kaufman, Diane; Kaufman, Scott (2013). Historical Dictionary of the Carter Era. Lanham, Maryland: The Scarecrow Press. ISBN 978-0-8108-7822-8.
- Keefer, Edward C., ed. (2017). Harold Brown: Offsetting the Soviet Military Challenge, 1977-1981. Washington, DC: Historical Office, Office of the Secretary of Defense. ISBN 978-0160937552.
- Keys, Barbara J. (2014). Reclaiming American Virtue: The Human Rights Revolution of the 1970s. Cambridge, Massachusetts: Harvard University Press. ISBN 978-0-674-72603-1.
- Robb, Thomas K. (2017). Jimmy Carter and the Anglo-American Special Relationship. Edinburgh: Edinburgh University Press. ISBN 978-1-4744-3261-0.
- Kucharsky, David (1976). The Man From Plains: The Mind and Spirit of Jimmy Carter. New York: Harper & Row. ISBN 0-06-064891-0.
- Mattson, Kevin (2009). What the Heck Are You Up To, Mr. President? Jimmy Carter, America's Malaise and the Speech That Should Have Changed the Country. Bloomsbury. ISBN 978-1-59691-521-3.
- Mitchell, Nancy (2016). Jimmy Carter in Africa: Race and the Cold War. Stanford, California: Stanford University Press. ISBN 978-0-8047-9385-8.
- Morgan, Iwan (2004). "Jimmy Carter, Bill Clinton, and the New Democratic Economics". The Historical Journal. 47 (4): 1015–1039. doi:10.1017/S0018246X0400408X. ISSN 0018-246X. S2CID 159975563.
- Morris, Kenneth Earl (1996). Jimmy Carter, American Moralist. University of Georgia Press. ISBN 0-8203-1862-0.
- Muravchik, Joshua (1986). The Uncertain Crusade: Jimmy Carter and the Dilemmas of Human Rights Policy. Lanham, Maryland: University Press of America. ISBN 0-8191-5108-4.
- Poe, Steven C. (1992). "Human Rights and Economic Aid Allocation under Ronald Reagan and Jimmy Carter". American Journal of Political Science. 36 (1): 147–167. doi:10.2307/2111428. ISSN 0092-5853. JSTOR 2111428.
- Ribuffo, Leo P. (1989). "God and Jimmy Carter". In M. L. Bradbury and James B. Gilbert (ed.). Transforming Faith: The Sacred and Secular in Modern American History. New York: Greenwood Press. pp. 141–159. ISBN 0-313-25707-8.
- —————— (1997). "'Malaise' revisited: Jimmy Carter and the crisis of confidence". In John Patrick Diggins (ed.). The Liberal Persuasion: Arthur Schlesinger Jr. and the Challenge of the American Past. Princeton: Princeton University Press. pp. 164–185. ISBN 0-691-04829-0.
- Robins, Glenn (2024). A Debt of Gratitude: How Jimmy Carter Put Viet Nam Veterans' Issues on the National Agenda. Lawrence, KS: University Press of Kansas.
- Roessner, Amber (2020). Jimmy Carter and the Birth of the Marathon Media Campaign. Baton Rouge, Louisiana: Louisiana State University Press. ISBN 978-0-8071-7079-3.
- Rosenbaum, Herbert D.; Ugrinsky, Alexej, eds. (1993). The Presidency and Domestic Policies of Jimmy Carter. Westport, Connecticut: Greenwood Press. ISBN 0-313-28845-3.
- ——————————; ———————, eds. (1994). Jimmy Carter: Foreign Policy and Post-Presidential Years. Westport, Connecticut: Greenwood Press. ISBN 0-313-28844-5.
- Sarantakes, Nicholas Evan (2011). Dropping the Torch: Jimmy Carter, the Olympic Boycott, and the Cold War. New York: Cambridge University Press. ISBN 978-0-521-17666-8.
- Sargent, Daniel J. (2015). A Superpower Transformed: The Remaking of American Foreign Relations in the 1970s. Oxford: Oxford University Press. ISBN 978-0-19-539547-1.
- Schram, Martin (1977). Running for President, 1976: The Carter Campaign. New York: Stein and Day. ISBN 0-8128-2245-5.
- Schmitz, David F.; Walker, Vanessa (2004). "Jimmy Carter and the Foreign Policy of Human Rights: the Development of a Post-cold War Foreign Policy". Diplomatic History. 28 (1): 113–143. doi:10.1111/j.1467-7709.2004.00400.x. ISSN 0145-2096.
- Smith, Gaddis (1986). Morality, Reason, and Power: American Diplomacy in the Carter Years. New York: Hill and Wang. ISBN 0-8090-7017-0.
- Strieff, Daniel (2015). Jimmy Carter and the Middle East: The Politics of Presidential Diplomacy. New York: Palgrave Macmillan. ISBN 978-1-137-49946-2.
- Strong, Robert A. (Fall 1986). "Recapturing leadership: The Carter administration and the crisis of confidence". Presidential Studies Quarterly. 16 (3): 636–650.
- ——————— (2000). Working in the World: Jimmy Carter and the Making of American Foreign Policy. Baton Rouge, Louisiana: Louisiana State University Press. ISBN 0-8071-2445-1.
- Talbott, Strobe (1979). Endgame: The Inside Story of Salt II. New York: Harper & Row. ISBN 0-06-014213-8.
- Thornton, Richard C. (1991). The Carter Years: Toward a New Global Order. New York: Paragon House. ISBN 1-55778-871-5.
- Ward, Jon (2019). Camelot's End: Kennedy vs. Carter and the Fight that Broke the Democratic Party. New York: Twelve Books. ISBN 978-1-4555-9138-1.
- White, Theodore H. (1982). America in Search of Itself: The Making of the President, 1956–1980. New York: Harper & Row. ISBN 0-446-37098-3.
- Williams, Daniel K. (2020). The Election of the Evangelical: Jimmy Carter, Gerald Ford, and the Presidential Contest of 1976. Lawrence: University Press of Kansas. ISBN 978-0-7006-2912-1.
- Woodroofe, Louise (2013). "Buried in the Sands of the Ogaden": The United States, the Horn of Africa, and the Demise of Détente. Kent, Ohio: Kent State University Press. ISBN 978-1-60635-184-0.
- Zelizer, Julian E. (2010). Jimmy Carter: The American Presidents Series: The 39th President, 1977–1981. Times Books. ISBN 978-0-8050-8957-8.

== Articles by Carter ==
- Carter, Jimmy (January 5, 2022). "Jimmy Carter: I Fear for Our Democracy". The New York Times. Archived from the original on October 14, 2024.
- Carter, Jimmy. "Camp David Accords". Encyclopædia Britannica (Online ed.). Chicago: Encyclopædia Britannica, Inc. ISSN 1085-9721. OCLC 33663660.

== Books by Carter ==
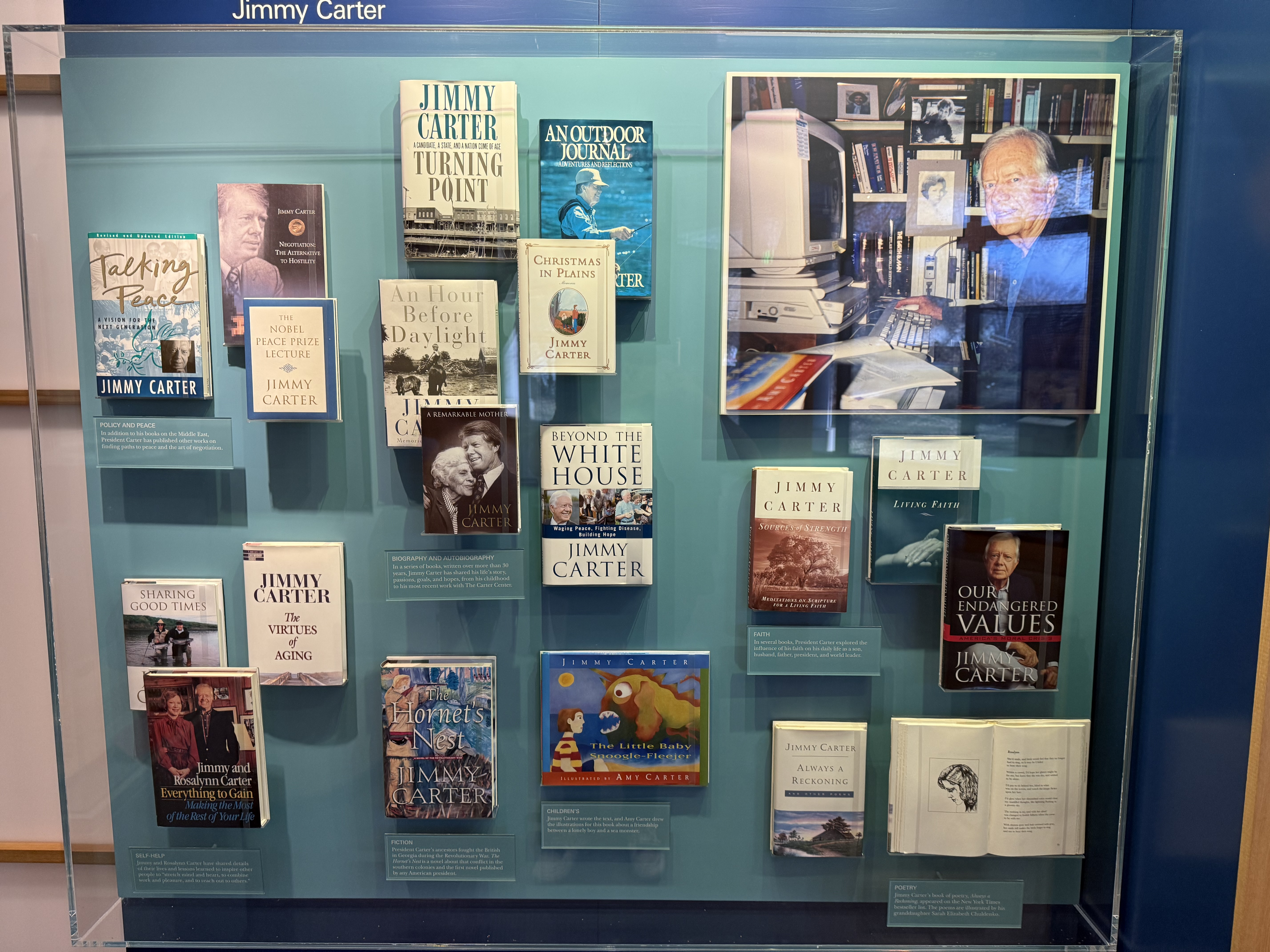
Collection of books written by Jimmy Carter.

- Carter, Jimmy (1975). Why Not the Best?. Nashville: Broadman Press. ISBN 978-0-8054-5582-3.
- Carter, Jimmy (1977). A Government as Good as Its People. New York: Simon & Schuster. ISBN 978-0-671-22815-6.
- Carter, Jimmy. Public Papers of the Presidents of the United States: Jimmy Carter, 1977 (1978–1981); annual compilation of all his public documents
- Carter, Jimmy (1982). Keeping Faith: Memoirs of a President. New York: Bantam Books. ISBN 978-0-553-05023-3.
- Carter, Jimmy (1984). Negotiation: The Alternative to Hostility. Macon, GA: Mercer University Press. ISBN 978-0-86554-137-5.
- Carter, Jimmy (1985). The Blood of Abraham: Insights into the Middle East. Chicago: Houghton Mifflin. ISBN 978-1-55728-293-4.
- Carter, Rosalynn; Carter, Jimmy (1987). Everything to Gain: Making the Most of the Rest of Your Life. New York: Random House. ISBN 978-0-394-55858-5.
- Carter, Jimmy (1992). Turning Point: A Candidate, a State, and a Nation Come of Age. New York: Three Rivers Press. ISBN 978-0-8129-2079-6.
- Carter, Jimmy (1994). An Outdoor Journal: Adventures and Reflections. Fayetteville: University of Arkansas Press. ISBN 978-1-55728-354-2.
- Carter, Jimmy (1995). Talking Peace: A Vision for the Next Generation: Revised Edition. London: Puffin. ISBN 978-0-14-037440-7.
- Carter, Jimmy (1995). Always a Reckoning, and Other Poems. New York: Times Books. ISBN 978-0-8129-2434-3.
- Carter, Amy; Carter, Jimmy (1995). The Little Baby Snoogle-Fleejer. New York: Times Books. ISBN 978-0-8129-2731-3.
- Carter, Jimmy (1996). Living Faith. New York: Times Books. ISBN 978-0-8129-3034-4.
- Carter, Jimmy (1997). Sources of Strength: Meditations on Scripture for a Living Faith. New York: Times Books. ISBN 978-0-8129-3236-2.
- Carter, Jimmy (1998). The Virtues of Aging. New York: Ballantine Pub. Group. ISBN 978-0-345-42592-8.
- Carter, Jimmy (2001). An Hour Before Daylight: Memories of a Rural Boyhood. New York: Simon & Schuster. ISBN 978-0-7432-1199-4.
- Carter, Jimmy (2001). Christmas in Plains: Memories. New York: Simon & Schuster. ISBN 978-0-7432-2715-5.
- Carter, Jimmy (2002). The Nobel Peace Prize Lecture: Delivered in Oslo on the 10th of December, 2002. New York: Simon & Schuster. ISBN 978-0-7432-5068-9.
- Carter, Jimmy (2003). The Hornet's Nest: A Novel of the Revolutionary War. New York: Simon & Schuster. ISBN 978-0-7432-5542-4. A historical novel about the American Revolution, and the first work of fiction written by a U.S. President.
- Carter, Jimmy (2004). Sharing Good Times. New York: Simon & Schuster. ISBN 978-0-7432-7068-7.
- Carter, Jimmy (2005). Our Endangered Values: America's Moral Crisis. New York: Simon & Schuster. ISBN 978-0-7432-8501-8. Won a Grammy Award for best spoken-word album.
- Carter, Jimmy (2006). Faith & Freedom: The Christian Challenge for the World. [London]: Duckworth. ISBN 978-0-7156-3610-7. UK edition of Our Endangered Values.
- Carter, Jimmy (2006). Palestine: Peace Not Apartheid. New York: Simon & Schuster. ISBN 978-0-7432-8502-5.
- Carter, Jimmy (2007). Leading a Worthy Life: Sunday Mornings in Plains: Bible Study with Jimmy Carter. Simon & Schuster Audio. ISBN 978-0-7435-6176-1.
- Carter, Jimmy (2007). Measuring Our Success: Sunday Mornings in Plains: Bible Study with Jimmy Carter. Simon & Schuster Audio. ISBN 978-0-7435-6726-8.
- Carter, Jimmy (2007). Beyond the White House. New York: Simon & Schuster. ISBN 978-1-4165-5880-4.
- Carter, Jimmy (2008). A Remarkable Mother. New York: Simon & Schuster. ISBN 978-1-4165-6245-0.
- Carter, Jimmy (2009). We Can Have Peace in the Holy Land: A Plan That Will Work. New York: Simon & Schuster. ISBN 978-1-4391-4063-5.
- Carter, Jimmy (2010). White House Diary. New York: Farrar, Straus and Giroux. ISBN 978-0-374-28099-4.
- Carter, Jimmy; Halliday, Steve (2011). Through the Year with Jimmy Carter: 366 Daily Meditations from the 39th President. Grand Rapids: Zondervan. ISBN 978-0-310-33048-6.
- Carter, Jimmy (2012). NIV Lessons from Life Bible: Personal Reflections with Jimmy Carter. Grand Rapids, Mich: Zondervan. ISBN 978-0-310-95081-3.
- Carter, Jimmy (2014). A Call to Action: Women, Religion, Violence, and Power. New York: Simon & Schuster. ISBN 978-1-4767-7395-7.
- Carter, Jimmy (2015). A Full Life: Reflections at Ninety. New York: Simon & Schuster. ISBN 978-1-5011-1563-9.
- Carter, Jimmy (2018). Faith: A Journey for All. New York: Simon & Schuster.

=== Reviews ===
- Kantowicz, Edward R. "Reminiscences of a Fated Presidency: Themes from the Carter Memoirs". Presidential Studies Quarterly 15#4 1986, pp. 651–665. JSTOR 40574415.
- Lafeber, Walter. "From confusion to Cold War: The memoirs of the Carter administration". Diplomatic History 8.1 (1984): 1–12 JSTOR 44254241.
- Thomas, Norman C. "The Carter Administration Memoirs: A Review Essay". Western Political Quarterly 39.2 (1986): 348–360. JSTOR 448303.

== Memoirs by Carter Administration aides and officials ==
- Brzezinski, Zbigniew (1983). Power and Principle: Memoirs of the National Security Adviser, 1977–1981. New York: Farrar, Straus and Giroux. ISBN 0374236631.
- Califano, Joseph A. Jr. (1981). Governing America. New York: Simon & Schuster. ISBN 978-1-4165-5211-6.
- Carter, Rosalynn (1984). First Lady from Plains. Boston: Houghton Mifflin. ISBN 5550054604.
- Gardner, Richard N. (2005). Mission Italy: On the Front Lines of the Cold War. Lanham, Maryland: Rowman & Littlefield. ISBN 0742539989.
- Jagoda, Barry (2020). Journeys with Jimmy Carter and other Adventures in Media. San Diego: Koehler Books. ISBN 978-1-64663-033-2.
- Jordan, Hamilton (1982). Crisis: The Last Year of the Carter Presidency. New York: G.P. Putnam's Sons. ISBN 0399127380.
- Lance, Bert; Gilbert, Bill (1991). The Truth of the Matter: My Life in and Out of Politics. New York: Summit Books. ISBN 978-0-671-69027-4.
- Mondale, Walter F.; Hage, David (2010). The Good Fight: A Life in Liberal Politics. Scribner: New York. ISBN 978-0-8166-9166-1.
- Powell, Jody (1984). The Other Side of the Story. New York: William Morrow & Co. ISBN 978-0-688-03646-1.
- Thompson, Kenneth W., ed. (1990). The Carter Presidency: Fourteen Intimate Perspectives of Jimmy Carter. Lanham, Maryland: University Press of America. ISBN 978-0-8191-7813-8.
- Turner, Stansfield (1985). Secrecy and Democracy: The CIA in Transition. Boston: Houghton Mifflin. ISBN 978-0-395-35573-2.
- Vance, Cyrus R. (1983). Hard Choices: Critical Years in America's Foreign Policy. New York: Simon & Schuster. ISBN 978-0-671-44339-9.
