= Jussi Hanhimäki =

Finnish historian

- Born: 3 February 1965 (age 61); Espoo, Finland
- Occupations: Historian and academic
- Title: Eleanor Rathbone Professor of Contemporary European History
- Awards: Bernath Lecture Prize (2004); Finland Distinguished Professor (2006)

Academic background
- Education: Tampere University; Boston University
- Doctoral advisor: Arnold A. Offner

Academic work
- Discipline: History
- Sub-discipline: Cold War; International relations; History of the foreign policy of the United States
- Institutions: Massachusetts Institute of Technology; Boston University; Bishop's University; Harvard University; London School of Economics; Graduate Institute of International and Development Studies; St Antony's College, Oxford

Jussi M. Hanhimäki (born 3 February 1965 in Espoo) is a Finnish historian, specializing in the history of the Cold War, American foreign policy, transatlantic relations, international organizations and refugees. He is the incoming inaugural Eleanor Rathbone Professor of Contemporary European History at the University of Oxford.

== Background ==
Hanhimäki is currently professor and the chair of the department of international history and politics at the Geneva Graduate Institute. His book The Flawed Architect: Henry Kissinger and American Foreign Policy has been acclaimed by his academic peers. In the U.S. media, however, its reception was lukewarm. In 2006, Hanhimäki was named Finland Distinguished Professor by the Academy of Finland. He earned his MA, American History (1987) and Ph.D., International History (1993) at Boston University, where his doctoral advisor was Arnold A. Offner. His BA in History is from Tampere University in 1986. He has previously taught at the Massachusetts Institute of Technology, Boston University, Bishop's University, Harvard University and the London School of Economics.

In June 2026, Hanhimäki was announced to have been elected as the inaugural Eleanor Rathbone Professor of Contemporary European History at the University of Oxford. He will take up the chair and its associated fellowship at St Antony's College in January 2027.

== Work ==
Hanhimäki has published or edited a dozen books. Among these, The Flawed Architect: Henry Kissinger and American Foreign Policy (2004) was awarded the Bernath Lecture Prize by the Society for Historians of American Foreign Relations, the leading learned society for the academic study of the history of United States foreign policy. He is one of the founding editors of the journal Cold War History and edited, together with Odd Arne Westad, The Cold War: A History in Documents and Eyewitness Accounts (2003, 2004). His articles have appeared in Cold War History, Diplomacy and Statecraft, Diplomatic History, Journal of Transatlantic Studies, Refugee Survey Quarterly, Politique étrangère, and Ulkopolitiikka.

Hanhimäki's most recent books are The Rise and Fall of Detente: American Foreign Policy and the Transformation of the Cold War and, together with Benedikt Schoenborn and Barbara Zanchetta, Transatlantic Relations since 1945: An Introduction. In 2013 he published, together with Bernhard Blumenau, An International History of Terrorism: Western and Non-Western Experiences.

Hanhimäki was a keynote speaker at the 2022 Transatlantic Studies Association Annual Conference. He has held visiting fellowships at LSE IDEAS, the Woodrow Wilson International Center for Scholars, and Harvard University. He has received major grants for research from the Swiss National Science Foundation, the Academy of Finland and the Social Sciences and Humanities Research Council of Canada. He is an elected member of the Finnish Academy of Science and Letters.

== Bibliography ==
- Hanhimäki, J., Rinnakkaiseloa patoamassa: Yhdysvallat ja Paasikiven linja: 1948-1956, 1996 (Svenska Handelshögskolans Studentkår)
- Hanhimäki, J., An Insecure Friendship: the United States and Scandinavia Since 1945, 1997 (Palgrave Macmillan)
- Hanhimäki, J., Containing Coexistence: America, Russia, and the ‘Finnish Solution,’ 1945-1956, 1997 (Kent State University Press)
- Best, A., Hanhimäki, J., Maiolo, J., Schultze, K., International History of the Twentieth Century 2003 (Routledge)
- Hanhimäki, J., Westad, O. A., The Cold War: A History in Documents and Eyewitness Accounts, 2003 (Oxford University Press)
- Hanhimäki, J., The Flawed Architect: Henry Kissinger and American Foreign Policy, 2004 (Oxford University Press)ISBN 978-0195172218
- Hanhimäki, J., United Nations: A Very Short Introduction, 2008 (Oxford University Press)
- Basil, G., Hanhimäki, J., Soutou, G.-H. (eds), Routledge Handbook of Transatlantic Security, 2010 (Routledge)
- Hanhimäki, J., Schoenborn, B., Zanchetta, B., Transatlantic Relations Since 1945: An Introduction, 2012 (Routledge)
- Hanhimäki, J., Blumenau, B (eds), An International History of Terrorism: Western and Non-Western Experiences, 2013 (Routledge)
- Hanhimäki, J., The Rise and Fall of Détente: American Foreign Policy and the Transformation of the Cold War, 2013 (Potomac Books)
- Hanhimäki, J., Pax Transatlantica: America and Europe in the Post-Cold War Era, 2021 (Oxford University Press)
