= George C. Herring =

American historian (1936–2022)

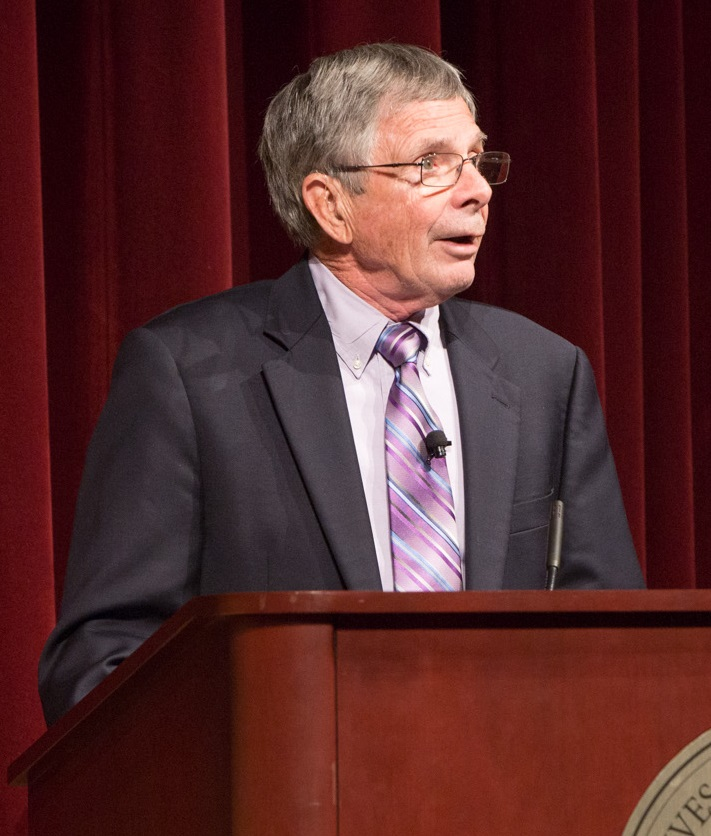
- Herring in 2015
- Born: George Cyril Herring; May 23, 1936; Blacksburg, Virginia, United States
- Died: November 30, 2022 (aged 86); Lexington, Kentucky, United States
- Education: Roanoke College (BA); University of Virginia (MA, PhD)
- Occupations: Historian, author, professor

George Cyril Herring (May 23, 1936 – November 30, 2022) was an American historian specializing in the history of U.S. foreign relations, with a particular focus on the Vietnam War.

== Early life and education ==
Born and raised in Blacksburg, Virginia, Herring earned his bachelor's degree from Roanoke College. After serving two years in the United States Navy, he attended the University of Virginia, where he earned an MA (1962) and a PhD (1965) in history.

== Career ==
Herring began his academic career teaching at Ohio University from 1965 before joining the University of Kentucky faculty in 1969. He taught there for 36 years until his retirement in 2005 as Alumni Professor of History Emeritus. During his tenure at Kentucky, he served three terms as chair of the history department and was acting director of the Patterson School of Diplomacy and International Commerce in 2005. In addition to his long-term position at the University of Kentucky, he was also a visiting professor at the University of Otago in New Zealand, the United States Military Academy at West Point, and the University of Richmond. His area of teaching expertise was the history of U.S. foreign relations. He taught a wide range of courses from introductory U.S. history surveys to graduate seminars and supervised 35 doctoral dissertations and over 50 master's degrees.

Herring served on the CIA's Historical Review Panel from 1990 to 1996, a panel established in 1984 to advise on the declassification of CIA operational records. Initially optimistic about increased transparency after the Cold War, Herring attended his first meeting in 1990, noting unusual procedures such as receiving cash payments in plain envelopes and being escorted to restrooms. Despite some progress by other agencies, the CIA panel was largely inactive between 1990 and 1994 and had little influence on declassification policies. Herring criticized the panel, calling CIA claims of openness a "brilliant public relations snow job". Promises to release documents on covert operations remained unfulfilled, often citing concerns about damaging to U.S. national security. The panel resumed meetings in 1996, including sessions with CIA Director John M. Deutch, but substantive progress was limited. Eventually, Herring and other original members were replaced during a reorganization. His experience highlighted the entrenched culture of secrecy within the CIA and the challenges historians face accessing its records.

As an author, Herring made contributions to the understanding of American foreign relations and the Vietnam War. His most influential work, America’s Longest War: The United States and Vietnam, 1950-1975, initially published in 1979, has seen multiple revisions, with the sixth edition appearing in 2020. The book has become a fixture of college reading lists and a resource for understanding the conflict that concluded with North Vietnam's victory. "Generations of college students have received their introduction to the war through the book... Indeed, it’s a fair guess that it has taught more Americans about the war than any other book," said Fredrik Logevall, professor of history and international relations at Harvard University. He also authored From Colony to Superpower: U.S. Foreign Relations Since 1776, which was a finalist for the National Book Critics Circle Award for Nonfiction, and won the 2009 Robert H. Ferrell Book Prize from the Society for Historians of American Foreign Relations. Other notable works include The Secret Diplomacy of the Vietnam War: The Negotiating Volumes of the Pentagon Papers and LBJ and Vietnam: A Different Kind of War.

Beyond his writing and teaching, Herring served as editor of the journal Diplomatic History and was a member and former president of the Society for Historians of American Foreign Relations. He also contributed to historical advisory committees, including the Department of the Army Historical Advisory Committee, and was involved with cultural and humanities organizations such as the Henry Clay Memorial Foundation and the Kentucky Humanities Council. Throughout his career, Herring received numerous honors, including fellowships from the National Endowment for the Humanities, Fulbright, Rockefeller Foundation, and Guggenheim foundations. He was recognized for his excellence in teaching with awards like the University of Kentucky Alumni Association Great Teacher Award and the Sturgill Award for Excellence in Graduate Education.

George C. Herring died of lung cancer on November 30, 2022, in Lexington, Kentucky, at the age of 86.

== Publications ==
=== Books ===
- Herring, George C. (1973). Aid to Russia, 1941-1946: Strategy, Diplomacy, the Origins of the Cold War. New York City: Columbia University Press. ISBN 978-0-231-03336-7. LCCN 72010545. OCLC 1031755213. S2CID 146141899.
- Herring, George C. (1979). America's Longest War: The United States and Vietnam, 1950–1975. New York City: John Wiley & Sons. ISBN 978-0-471-01546-8. JSTOR 23379516. LCCN 79016408. OCLC 5126110. S2CID 222336942.
- Herring, George C., ed. (1983). The Secret Diplomacy of the Vietnam War: The Negotiating Volumes of the Pentagon Papers. Austin, Texas: University of Texas Press. ISBN 978-0-292-77573-2. LCCN 82021960. OCLC 1303936536. S2CID 154148229.
- Herring, George C.; Coleman, Kenneth M., eds. (1985). The Central American Crisis: Sources of Conflict and the Failure of U.S. Policy. Wilmington, Delaware: Scholarly Resources. ISBN 978-0-8420-2238-5. LCCN 84027624. OCLC 11548365. S2CID 153276587.
- Herring, George C.; Carroll, John M., eds. (1986). Modern American Diplomacy. Wilmington, Delaware: Scholarly Resources. ISBN 978-0-8420-2264-4. LCCN 86011918. OCLC 1087624009.
- Herring, George C., ed. (1993). The Pentagon Papers: Abridged Edition. New York City: McGraw Hill Education. ISBN 978-0-07-028380-0. LCCN 92032172. OCLC 1079408766. S2CID 149858410.
- Herring, George C. (1994). LBJ and Vietnam: A Different Kind of War. Austin, Texas: University of Texas Press. ISBN 978-0-292-73085-4. LCCN 93036793. OCLC 1154817806. S2CID 159030967.
- Herring, George C. (2008). From Colony to Superpower: U.S. Foreign Relations Since 1776. New York City: Oxford University Press. doi:10.1093/oso/9780195078220.001.0001. ISBN 978-0-19-507822-0. LCCN 2008007996. OCLC 212018624. S2CID 161094023.

=== Articles ===
- Herring, George C. (December 1, 1991). "America and Vietnam: The Unending War". Foreign Affairs. ISSN 0015-7120. Archived from the original on April 26, 2025.
- Herring, George C. (May 1, 1995). "The Wrong Kind of Loyalty: McNamara's Apology for Vietnam". Foreign Affairs. ISSN 0015-7120. Archived from the original on April 26, 2025.
- Herring, George C. (July 28, 2015). "LBJ's tragic "addiction" to Vietnam: The mistake that still haunts America 50 years later". Salon.com. Archived from the original on April 17, 2025.
- Herring, George C. (January 27, 2017). "Opinion | The Road to Tet". The New York Times. ISSN 0362-4331. Archived from the original on April 17, 2025.
- Herring, George C. (September 19, 2017). "Opinion | How Not to 'Win Hearts and Minds'". The New York Times. ISSN 0362-4331. Archived from the original on April 17, 2025.
- Herring, George C. (April 15, 2019). "Lessons From Vietnam on Leaving Afghanistan: There's No Good Way to End a Bad War, but Some Options Are Worse Than Others". Foreign Affairs. ISSN 0015-7120. Archived from the original on April 26, 2025.

=== Papers ===
- Herring, George C. (June 1969). "Lend-Lease to Russia and the Origins of the Cold War, 1944–1945". The Journal of American History. 56 (1). Oxford University Press: 93–114. doi:10.2307/1902065. ISSN 1936-0967. JSTOR 1902065.
- Herring, George C. (April 1977). "The Truman Administration and the Restoration of French Sovereignty in Indochina". Diplomatic History. 1 (2). Oxford University Press: 97–117. doi:10.1111/j.1467-7709.1977.tb00233.x. ISSN 1467-7709. JSTOR 24909909.
- Herring, George C.; Immerman, Richard H. (September 1984). "Eisenhower, Dulles, and Dienbienphu: "The Day We Didn't Go to War" Revisited". The Journal of American History. 71 (2). Oxford University Press: 343–363. doi:10.2307/1901759. ISSN 1936-0967. JSTOR 1901759.
- Herring, George C. (June 1986). "Vietnam Remembered". The Journal of American History. 73 (1). Oxford University Press: 152–164. doi:10.2307/1903610. ISSN 1936-0967. JSTOR 1903610.
- Herring, George C. (April 1987). "Final Report to the SHAFR Council". Diplomatic History. 11 (2). Oxford University Press: 179–180. doi:10.1111/j.1467-7709.1987.tb00012.x. ISSN 1467-7709. JSTOR 24911722.
- Herring, George C. (January 1990). ""Peoples Quite Apart": Americans, South Vietnamese, and the War in Vietnam". Diplomatic History. 14 (1). Oxford University Press: 1–23. doi:10.1111/j.1467-7709.1990.tb00073.x. ISSN 1467-7709. JSTOR 24912029.
- Herring, George C. (October 2004). "The Cold War and Vietnam". OAH Magazine of History. Vol. 18, no. 5. Oxford University Press. pp. 18–21. doi:10.1093/maghis/18.5.18. ISSN 0882-228X. JSTOR 25163717.
- Herring, George C. (June 2007). "A SHAFR Retrospective". Diplomatic History. 31 (3). Oxford University Press: 397–400. doi:10.1111/j.1467-7709.2007.00618.x. ISSN 1467-7709. JSTOR 24916076.
- Herring, George C. (April 2017). "Beginning a Debate on Vietnam". Diplomatic History. 41 (2). Oxford University Press: 233–234. doi:10.1093/dh/dhw081. ISSN 1467-7709. JSTOR 26376851.
