= Margaret O'Mara =

American historian and professor (born 1970)

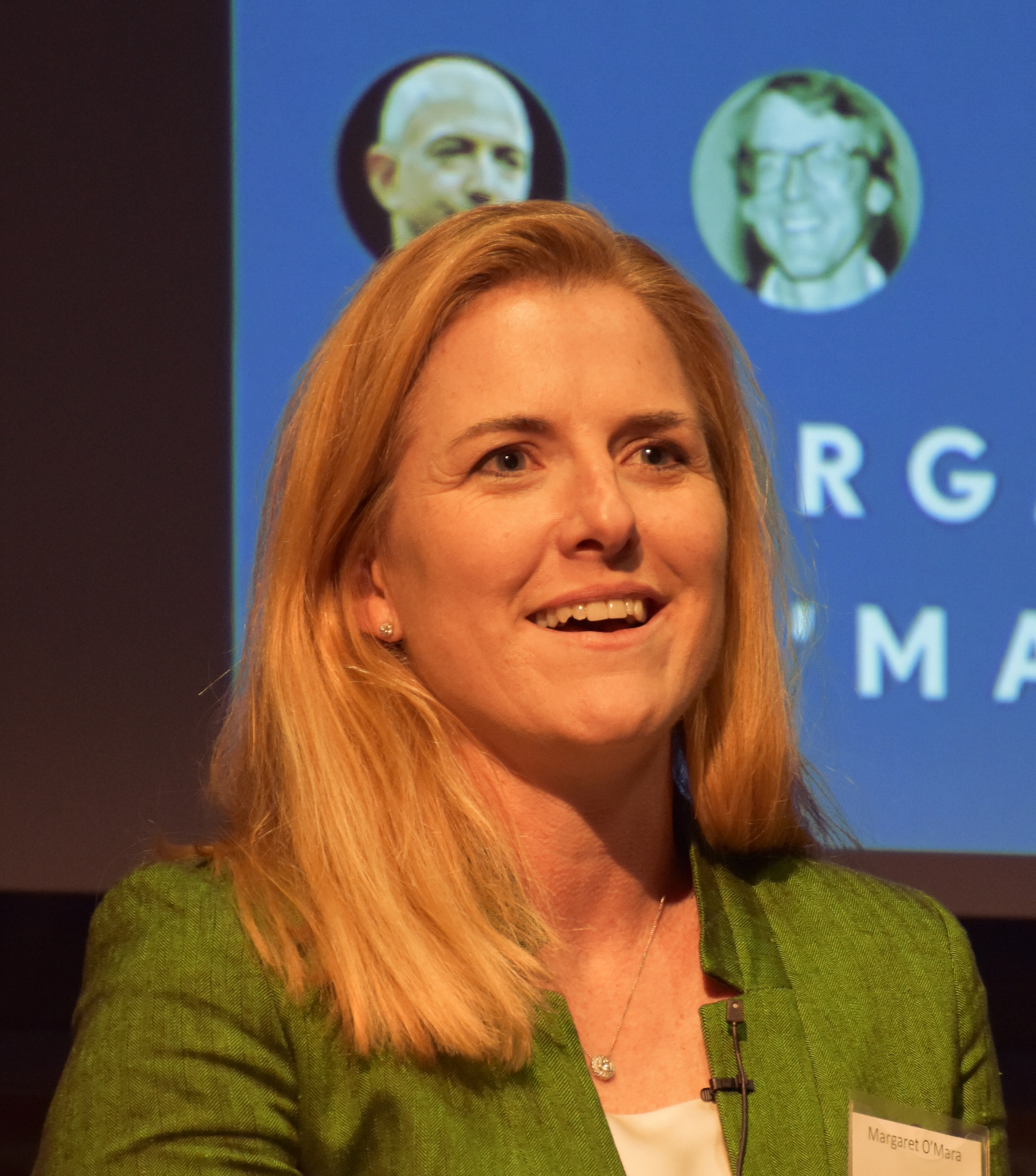
- Margaret O'Mara presenting her book The Code (2019)
- Born: Margaret Pugh; November 15, 1970 (age 55)
- Occupations: historian and professor at University of Washington

Academic background
- Education: Northwestern University
- Alma mater: University of Pennsylvania
- Website: https://www.margaretomara.com

Margaret O'Mara (born 1970) is an American historian and professor who holds the Scott and Dorothy Bullitt Chair of American History at the University of Washington.

== Background ==
Margaret O'Mara was born Margaret Pugh on November 15, 1970.

O'Mara received her B.A. in 1992 from Northwestern University, with majors in English and history, and her Ph.D. from the University of Pennsylvania.

== Career ==
From 1994 to 1996, O'Mara served as a policy analyst on the staff of Vice President Al Gore.

O'Mara is a past fellow of the Center for Advanced Studies in the Behavioral Sciences at Stanford University. She was an assistant professor in the Department of History at Stanford University (2002–7) before joining the University of Washington.

She is a Distinguished Lecturer of the Organization of American Historians.

Her expertise includes the relations between technology and politics, and between technology companies and urban development. She has written research papers about Silicon Valley and American presidents. She is currently researching America's Gilded Age.

== Bibliography ==
- Cities of Knowledge: Cold War Science and the Search for the Next Silicon Valley, Princeton University Press, 2005, ISBN 9780691117164 (reviews)
- Pivotal Tuesdays: Four Elections That Shaped the Twentieth Century, University of Pennsylvania Press, 2015, ISBN 9780812247466 (reviews)
- The Code: Silicon Valley and the Remaking of America, Penguin Random House, 2019, ISBN 9780399562181
- The American Pageant (with Thomas A. Bailey, David M. Kennedy and Lizabeth Cohen), 18th edition, Cengage, 2024, ISBN 978-0357898864

== Private life ==
O'Mara is married to Healthentic CEO and President Jeffery Lawrence O'Mara.
