= Hokanson =

Hokanson is a surname. Notable people with the surname include:

- Daniel R. Hokanson (born 1963), United States Army officer
- Leonard Hokanson (1931–2003), American pianist
- Randolph Hokanson (1915–2018), American pianist
- Shirley A. Hokanson (born 1936), American politician and social worker
- Ryan B. Hokanson (born 2009), American lacrosse player

== See also ==
- Hoganson
