= Hornets Nest =

A hornets' nest is a place of refuge for hornets.

Hornets Nest or hornet's nest may also refer to:

== Places ==
- Charlotte, North Carolina, nicknamed The Hornet's Nest and home to the Charlotte Hornets

== Arts and entertainment ==
- The Hornet's Nest (1919), American drama film directed by James Young
- Hornet's Nest (1923 film), British drama film directed by Walter West
- The Hornet's Nest (1955 film), British comedy film
- Hornets' Nest (1970), an Italian-American war film directed by Phil Karlson
- Hornet's Nest (novel), a 1997 novel
- The Hornet's Nest (novel), a 2003 novel by former president Jimmy Carter
- Hornets' Nest (audio drama), a 2009 Doctor Who audio play
- The Hornet's Nest (2014 film), an American documentary film about the Afghanistan War

== Other uses ==
- Hornet's Nest (Civil War), a salient held by the Union army in the 1862 Battle of Shiloh
- Hornets Nest (Sacramento State), a gymnasium at California State University, Sacramento
- Hornet's Nest, a Palestinian militant/insurgent group operating in the West Bank, affiliated with the Al-Aqsa Martyrs' Brigades

== See also ==
- The Girl Who Kicked the Hornets' Nest (2007), the third novel in Stieg Larsson's Millennium series
