= Dudziak =

Dudziak is a surname. Notable people with the surname include:

- Jeremy Dudziak (born 1995), German footballer
- Marian Dudziak (born 1941), Polish sprinter
- Mary L. Dudziak, American legal theorist
- Urszula Dudziak (born 1943), Polish jazz vocalist
