= Robert J. McMahon =

American historian (born 1949)

Dr. Robert McMahon
- Born: 1949 (age 76–77)

Academic background
- Education: Fairfield University (BA); University of Connecticut (PhD)

Academic work
- Discipline: International Relations
- Institutions: University of Florida; Ohio State University

Robert James McMahon (born 1949) is an American historian of the foreign relations of the United States and a scholar of the Cold War. He currently holds the chair of Ralph D. Mershon Distinguished Professor at Ohio State University.

== Career ==
McMahon received his B.A. from Fairfield University in 1971 and PhD from the University of Connecticut in 1977. He taught at the University of Florida from 1982 to 2005, when he moved to Ohio State University. He has held visiting positions at the University of Virginia and University College Dublin. McMahon holds a joint appointment with the Mershon Center for International Security Studies at OSU.

McMahon served as 2001 president of the Society for Historians of American Foreign Relations.

== Reception ==
=== The Cold War on the Periphery: The United States, India, and Pakistan ===
Noel H Pugach from the University of New Mexico, in Pacific Historical Review, calls the book an "excellent monograph" tracing the US-India-Pakistan relationship and a "solid and sound study". Pugach observes that McMahon has "exhaustively" researched primary sources from the United States and comments that the book will serve as a model reference point for studies of US-Third World relations during the Cold War.

According to Kenton J. Clymer from the University of Texas in The American Historical Review it is a "superb" study of the relations between the US, India and Pakistan, which makes use of the best available archival documents. Clymer calls it an excellent work which will be a "definitive account" of American policy in South Asia during the Cold War.

Richard Ned Lebow in The American Political Science Review calls it a "careful historical study" while Rafique Kawthari notes in Current History that the professor of history, Robert McMahon, has relied mainly on recently declassified documents and calls the historical study timely. Warren I. Cohen, from the University of Maryland's Department of History, states in Reviews in American History that Robert McMahon had already established himself as one of the best diplomatic historians and this "magnificent" book delivers "far more than its title promises". Cohen further comments that McMahon has written the best book on American relations with South Asia during the 1945-1965 period.

== Works ==
=== Books ===
- The Cold War in the Third World. New York, NY: Oxford University Press. 2013. ISBN 978-0-199-76868-4. Editor.
- Guide to U.S. Foreign Policy: A Diplomatic History. Washington, DC: CQ Press. 2012. ISBN 978-1-608-71910-5. Co-editor with Thomas W. Zeiler
- Dean Acheson and the Creation of an American World Order. Dulles, VA: Potomac Books. 2008. ISBN 978-1-574-88927-7.
- Major Problems in History of Vietnam War. 4th ed. Boston, MA: Houghton Mifflin. 2007. ISBN 978-0-618-749379.
- The Cold War: A Very Short Introduction. Oxford: Oxford University Press. 2003. ISBN 978-0-192-80178-4. Editor.
- The Limits of Empire: The United States and Southeast Asia since World War II. New York, NY: Columbia University Press. 1999. ISBN 978-0-231-10880-5.
- The Origins of the Cold War. 4th ed. Boston, MA: Houghton Mifflin. 1998. ISBN 978-0-395-90430-5. Co-author with Thomas G. Paterson.
- The Cold War on the Periphery: The United States, India, and Pakistan. New York, NY: Columbia University Press. 1994. ISBN 978-0-231-08226-6.
- Colonialism and Cold War: The United States and the Struggle for Indonesian Independence, 1945–49. Ithaca, NY: Cornell University Press. 1981. ISBN 978-0-801-47717-1.

=== Articles and chapters ===
- "US national security policy from Eisenhower to Kennedy" (PDF). In Melvyn P. Leffler & Odd Arne Westad, eds., The Cambridge History of the Cold War, Volume I: Origins (pp. 288–311). Cambridge: Cambridge University Press, 2010. 25 March 2010. ISBN 978-0-521-83719-4.
- McMahon, Robert J. (2010). "The Politics, and Geopolitics, of American Troop Withdrawals from Vietnam, 1968–1972" (PDF). Diplomatic History. 34 (3): 471–483. doi:10.1111/j.1467-7709.2010.00862.x. Archived from the original (PDF) on 21 December 2010.
- McMahon, Robert J. (2006). "U.S. Policy toward South Asia and Tibet during the Early Cold War". Journal of Cold War Studies. 8 (3): 131–144. doi:10.1162/jcws.2006.8.3.131. S2CID 57560380.
- "The Point of No Return: The Eisenhower Administration and Indonesia, 1953–1960". In Kathryn C. Statler & Andrew L. Johns, eds., The Eisenhower Administration, the Third World, and the Globalization of the Cold War (pp. 75–100). Lanham, MD: Rowman & Littlefield. 2006. ISBN 978-0-742-55381-1.
- McMahon, Robert J. (2005). "Diplomatic History and Policy History: Finding Common Ground". Journal of Policy History. 17 (1): 93–109. doi:10.1353/jph.2005.0005. S2CID 154275441.
- McMahon, Robert (2002). "Contested Memory: The Vietnam War and American Society, 1975–2001". Diplomatic History. 26 (2): 159–184. doi:10.1111/1467-7709.00306.
- "Introduction: The Challenge of the Third World" (PDF). In Peter L. Hahn & Mary Ann Heiss, eds., Empire and Revolution: The United States and the Third World since 1945 (pp. 1–14). Columbus, OH: Ohio State University Press. 2001. ISBN 978-0-814-20856-4. Archived from the original (PDF) on 5 December 2013.
- McMahon, Robert J. (2001). "Cultures of Empire". Journal of American History. 88 (3): 888–892. doi:10.2307/2700390. JSTOR 2700390.
- McMahon, Robert J. (1996). "The Illusion of Vulnerability: American Reassessments of the Soviet Threat, 1955–1956". The International History Review. 18 (3): 591–619. doi:10.1080/07075332.1996.9640755. JSTOR 40107497.
- McMahon, Robert J. (1990). "The Study of American Foreign Relations: National History or International History?". Diplomatic History. 14 (4): 554–564. doi:10.1111/j.1467-7709.1990.tb00108.x.
- McMahon, Robert J. (1988). "United States Cold War Strategy in South Asia: Making a Military Commitment to Pakistan, 1947–1954" (PDF). Journal of American History. 75 (3): 812–840. doi:10.2307/1901531. JSTOR 1901531. Archived from the original (PDF) on 3 December 2013.
- McMahon, Robert J. (1986). "Eisenhower and Third World Nationalism: A Critique of the Revisionists". Political Science Quarterly. 101 (3): 453–473. doi:10.2307/2151625. JSTOR 2151625.
