= The American Pageant =

1956 book by Thomas A. Bailey

- The American Pageant, Seventeenth Edition
- Author: Thomas A. Bailey; David Kennedy; Lizabeth Cohen; Margaret O'Mara (since the 18th edition)
- Illustrator: Nathan Roe
- Language: English
- Subject: United States history
- Publisher: D. C. Heath and Company; Houghton Mifflin; Cengage
- Publication date: 1 January 2025
- Publication place: United States
- Pages: 1152
- ISBN: 978-1337616225
- Preceded by: The American Pageant- Sixteenth Edition

The American Pageant, initially published by Thomas A. Bailey in 1956, is an American high school history textbook often used for AP United States History, AICE American History as well as IB History of the Americas courses. Since Bailey's death in 1983, the book has been updated by historians David M. Kennedy and Lizabeth Cohen, and it is now in its eighteenth edition (with a new author, Margaret O'Mara). It is published by Cengage and is listed by the College Board among the textbooks that meet the curricular requirements of AP United States History.

== Structure ==
=== Twelfth edition ===
Four different versions of the 12th edition were printed. All are divided into six parts, from "Founding the New Nation" (with an initial chapter on prehistory, natives, and European exploration) through "Making Modern America." The six parts are subdivided into a total of 42 chapters spanning 1034 pages. The book's chronology officially ends in the year 2001, though later printings include an additional three paragraphs detailing the 2004 US election as well as September 11. Since then, the incumbent edition of the American Pageant included information regarding the 2008 presidential election.

The four versions of the Twelfth Edition are the Complete Edition, the version "For Advanced High School Courses," published by Houghton Mifflin. There are also two editions that split the textbook into two volumes: Volume I, which covers American history up to 1877, and Volume II, which covers the American history since 1865.

=== Thirteenth edition ===
The thirteenth edition, released in 2006, contains 42 chapters in six parts. The book's chronology is updated, briefly covering the United States' invasion of Afghanistan, the 2003 invasion of Iraq, and the USA PATRIOT Act. Chapters 27 and 28 from the 12th Edition were combined in the 13th edition.

=== Fourteenth edition ===
The fourteenth edition, released in 2010, contains 42 chapters in six parts. This edition adds twelve new "Thinking Globally" essays and many new box-quotes adding more international voices to the events chronicled in the book's historical narrative. The "Varying Viewpoints" essays were updated reflecting new interpretations of significant trends and events, as well as concern for their global context. The text's global focus is renewed and strengthened. Also the edition has new and revised primary source features called "Examining the Evidence".

=== Fifteenth edition ===
The fifteenth edition, released in 2013, contains 42 chapters in six parts. This edition includes markedly deeper cultural innovations, artistic movements, and intellectual doctrines that have engaged and inspired Americans and shaped the course of history of the United States, new "Thinking Globally" essay on twentieth-century modernism in Chapter 31, new "Makers of America" feature on Beat Generation of the 1950s in Chapter 37. The book's tables, graphs, Key Terms, People to Know, and To Learn More sections are also updated. This is the first edition in which Bailey is not credited as an author on the cover and the title page. The textbook covers American history up until the September 11 attacks.

=== Sixteenth edition ===
The sixteenth edition, released in 2015, contains 41 chapters in six parts. This edition's Part Six, which covers post-1945 period is revised. Chapters 29 and 30 from the 15th Edition were combined in the sixteenth edition. Each chapter has a new feature called “Contending Voices”, which offers paired quotes from original historical sources, accompanied by questions which prompt students to think about conflicting perspectives on controversial subjects. It also extends the textbook's historical coverage to the year 2014.

=== Seventeenth edition ===
The seventeenth edition, released 1 January 2019, separates the narrative into nine historical periods to better address historical thinking skills and reasoning processes. Aboriginal American history from European arrival to the 21st Century is given enhanced attention. Western expansion and its human and environmental consequences are also examined. Presentation of Postbellum America and American capitalism with insights into American’s role in the industrialization and modernization of the global society is refreshed. What's more, coverage of "Contending Voices" is also revised.

=== Eighteenth edition ===
The eighteenth edition, released 1 January 2025, has much broader coverage of Aboriginal American and Asian American histories.

== Critiques ==
In 1992 article for Perspectives, the newsletter of the American Historical Association, Richard White criticized the ninth edition's discussion of the American frontier. He took issue with the book describing the Native Americans as sharing a "habitat" with wild animals and felt that it generally relegated natives to the sidelines. However, he did praise the textbook for discussing the overarching economic forces behind westward expansion.

Historian Emil Pocock, evaluating the 10th edition of 1994, argues that the publisher has made a special effort to be more approachable for beginning students by using a more basic vocabulary, simpler concepts, and features designed to aid learning. This textbook, he says, therefore uses easy syntax, unsophisticated interpretations, and gives only limited coverage to complex and controversial topics. The typeface is large, and the page layout is generous with many color illustrations. It gives a basic political narrative emphasizing great men and famous events, although it does include new topics regarding diversity of race and gender. Pocock states:

It is at heart a patriotic work that celebrates American progress and the free enterprise system, while largely ignoring dissenting political viewpoints outside the mainstream. Sidebars present broader historiographic interpretations, but the context seems clearly intended to convey the notion that these other views are mistaken in some way.

Scholars including James W. Loewen and Ibram X. Kendi have criticized the book. Loewen noted in a 2011 article that the authors (of the 2006 edition) cited a few sentences from the South Carolina Declaration of Secession, in which that Southern state seceded from the Union, but managed to leave out any reference to slavery as a cause: "Why would Pageant use ellipses to cover up slavery as the cause? It is likely that Houghton Mifflin [then the publishers of the book] took pains to avoid the subject lest some southern state textbook adoption board take offense." The 16th edition (published 2016) still contains untrue representations of slavery, according to Kendi, for instance by referring to kidnapped and enslaved Africans as immigrants to the United States, and using the term "mulattoes" (which Kendi considers racist) to refer to the children of white planters and African-American women. A CBS report cited a passage from the book with the term: "In the deeper South, many free blacks were mulattoes, usually the emancipated children of a white planter and his black mistress." The same report states that anthropologist Naomi Reed, after reviewing the 12th (2007) and 15th (2015) editions, determined that the textbook "consistently takes a white redemptive narrative of American history."
