= Paul A. Varg =

American historian

Paul A. Varg (March 20, 1912 – February 23, 1994) was an American historian. He was a leading scholar in the field of U.S. foreign relations. The historical subject of China was one of particular interest to Varg.

== Biography ==
Varg was from Worcester, Massachusetts. He attended Clark University for his bachelor's and master's degrees. He received his PhD from the University of Chicago in 1947 with a dissertation on William Woodville Rockhill, under the influence of Harley F. MacNair. He served in the U.S. Navy during World War II. Varg began teaching at Ohio State University, rising to the rank of associate professor, and moved in 1958 to Michigan State University, where he remained for the rest of his career. He taught at the University of Stockholm in 1955–1956 as a visiting Fulbright scholar. From 1962 to 1969, he was the first Dean of the College of Arts and Letters at Michigan State. Varg served as president of the Society for Historians of American Foreign Relations in 1979. He retired in July 1981. He is remembered by an annual faculty award at Michigan State.

== Bibliography ==
- Open Door Diplomat: The Life of W.W. Rockhill (University of Illinois Press, 1952).
- Missionaries, Chinese, and Diplomats: The American Protestant Missionary Movement in China, 1890-1952 (Princeton University Press, 1958).
- Foreign Policies of the Founding Fathers (Michigan State University Press, 1963).
- The Closing of the Door: Sino-American Relations, 1936-1946 (Michigan State University Press, 1973).
- United States Foreign Relations, 1820-1860 (Michigan State University Press, 1979).
- New England and Foreign Relations, 1789-1850 (University Press of New England, 1982).
- America, from Client State to World Power: Six Major Transitions in United States Foreign Relations (University of Oklahoma Press, 1990).
- Edward Everett: The Intellectual in the Turmoil of Politics (Susquehanna University Press, 1992).
