= Hoganson =

Hoganson is a surname. Notable people with the surname include:

- Dale Hoganson (born 1949), Canadian ice hockey player
- Michael Hoganson (born 1993), English footballer
- Paul Hoganson (born 1949), Canadian ice hockey player
- Kristin L. Hoganson, American historian

== See also ==
- Hogenson
