= Society for Historians of American Foreign Relations =

- Abbreviation: SHAFR
- Formation: 1967
- Executive Director: Amy Sayward
- President: Mary Ann Heiss
- Website: shafr.org

The Society for Historians of American Foreign Relations (SHAFR) was founded in 1967 in order to "promote excellence in research and teaching of American foreign relations history and to facilitate professional collaboration among scholars and students in this field around the world." SHAFR organizes an annual conference, and publishes the quarterly Diplomatic History. It also publishes a triennial newsletter, Passport. SHAFR has increasingly fostered connections with international historians and organizations.

== History ==
SHAFR was founded in April 1967, as a result of the efforts of Joseph O'Grady, Betty Miller Unterbeger, Armin Rappaport, and David Trask. The first meeting took place during the meeting of the Organization of American Historians in Chicago, Illinois, and was attended by around 75 scholars in the field. Its first stand-alone national conference was held at Georgetown University in 1975. A volume that included some of the papers presented at that conference included an all-male cast of authors and papers focused on male foreign-policy actors such as George F. Kennan, Charles E. Bohlen, and James G. Blaine.

Founded in the midst of tremendous social and political change, the Society sought to support new understandings of the U.S. role in the world, and to attract attention to the study with foreign relations of other countries. Finding an audience interested in such an approach, the Society grew. In 1976, it announced that, after a debate lasting since the beginning of SHAFR, the organization would publish a journal; this journal would be Diplomatic History, the first issue of which was published in January 1978.

SHAFR has benefitted from the benevolence of Gerald and Myrna Bernath, who donated money to the organization in memory of their son Stuart L. Bernath. These funds are used to support graduate students and new scholars.

Besides its own official activities, SHAFR cooperates with other academic and public history organizations. For example, SHAFR is a member of the National Coalition for History and has representatives on the Historical Advisory Committee of the U.S. Department of State's Office of the Historian. Notably, SHAFR also hosted events at the meeting of the American Historical Association until 2024.

In 1986, Betty Miller Unterberger of Texas A&M University became the first woman president of the organization, then 99 percent male in membership. Since then, the organization has had seven more women presidents: Emily Rosenberg (Macalester College, 1997), Marilyn B. Young (New York University, 2011), Mary L. Dudziak (Emory University, 2017), Barbara Keys (University of Melbourne, 2019), Kristin Hoganson (University of Illinois Urbana-Champaign, 2020), Laura Belmonte (Virginia Tech, 2022), and Mary Ann Heiss (Kent State University, 2023). Keys was the first president in the organization's history to be based at a university outside the United States. Cambridge University historian Andrew Preston was elected vice president/president-elect in 2019; in 2021 he became the first SHAFR president not to hold U.S. citizenship.

== Leadership ==
=== SHAFR Officers ===
The SHAFR Business Office is located at Middle Tennessee State University, where Executive Director Amy Sayward is a history professor. The president is Mitchell Lerner, The Ohio State University.

=== Past Presidents ===
- 2023– Mary Ann Heiss, Kent State University
- 2022– Laura Belmonte, Virginia Tech
- 2021– Andrew Preston, Cambridge
- 2020– Kristin Hoganson, University of Illinois Urbana-Champaign
- 2019– Barbara Keys, University of Melbourne
- 2018– Peter L. Hahn, The Ohio State University
- 2017– Mary L. Dudziak, Emory University
- 2016– David Engerman, Brandeis University
- 2015– Tim Borstelmann, University of Nebraska, Lincoln
- 2014– Fredrik Logevall, Harvard University
- 2013– Mark Philip Bradley, University of Chicago
- 2012– Thomas Zeiler, University of Colorado, Boulder
- 2011– Marilyn B. Young, New York University
- 2010– Andrew J. Rotter, Colgate University
- 2009– Frank Costigliola, University of Connecticut
- 2008– Thomas A. Schwartz, Vanderbilt University
- 2007– Richard Immerman, Temple University
- 2006– Randall B. Woods, University of Arkansas
- 2005– David L. Anderson, California State University, Monterey Bay
- 2004– Mark A. Stoler, University of Vermont
- 2003– Michael J. Hogan, The Ohio State University
- 2002– Robert L. Beisner, American University
- 2001– Robert J. McMahon, University of Florida
- 2000– Robert D. Schulzinger, University of Colorado, Boulder
- 1999– Walter LaFeber, Cornell University
- 1998– Arnold Offner, Lafayette College
- 1997– Emily Rosenberg, Macalester College
- 1996– Mark Gilderhus, Colorado State University
- 1995– Robert Dallek, University of California, Los Angeles
- 1994– Melvyn Leffler, University of Virginia
- 1993– Warren Kimball, Rutgers University-Newark
- 1992– John Lewis Gaddis, Ohio University
- 1991– Gary Hess, Bowling Green State University
- 1990– Michael Hunt, University of North Carolina, Chapel Hill
- 1989– George C. Herring, University of Kentucky
- 1988– Lloyd Gardner, Rutgers University
- 1987– Thomas G. Paterson, University of Connecticut
- 1986– Betty Unterberger, Texas A&M University
- 1985– Warren F. Kuehl, University of Akron
- 1984– Warren I. Cohen, Michigan State University
- 1983– Ernest R. May, Harvard University
- 1982– Lawrence E. Gelfand, University of Iowa
- 1981– Lawrence S. Kaplan, Kent State University
- 1980– David M. Pletcher, Indiana University
- 1979– Paul A. Varg, Michigan State University
- 1978– Akira Iriye, University of Chicago
- 1977– Raymond A. Esthus, Tulane University
- 1976– Robert A. Divine, University of Texas, Austin
- 1975– Armin H. Rappaport, University of California, San Diego
- 1974– Bradford Perkins, University of Michigan
- 1973– Wayne S. Cole, University of Maryland
- 1972– Norman A. Graebner, University of Virginia
- 1971– Robert H. Ferrell, Indiana University
- 1970– Richard W. Leopold, Northwestern University
- 1969– Alexander DeConde, University of California, Santa Barbara
- 1968– Thomas A. Bailey, Stanford University

=== Committees ===
- Elected Committee
  - Nominating Committee
- Permanent Committees
  - Annual Meeting Program Committee
  - Ways and Means Committee
  - Board of Editors, Diplomatic History
  - Editorial Advisory Board, Passport
- Standing Committees
  - Committee on Digital Resources and Archival Sharing
  - Committee on Historical Documentation
  - Committee on Access, Representation, and Equity (CARE)
  - Committee on Women in SHAFR
  - Conference Committee
  - Code of Conduct Reporting Team
  - Development Committee
  - Graduate Student Committee
  - Membership Committee
  - Teaching Committee
- Award and Prize Committees
  - Stuart L. Bernath Book Prize
  - Stuart L. Bernath Lecture Prize
  - Stuart L. Bernath Scholarly Article Prize
  - Dissertation Prize Committee
  - Robert H. Ferrell Book Prize
  - Norman and Laura Graebner Award
  - Peter L. Hahn Distinguished Service Award Committee
  - Michael H. Hunt Prize for International History
  - Link-Kuehl Prize for Documentary Editing
- Grant and Fellowship Committees
  - Myrna Bernath Book and Fellowship Awards
  - Graduate Student Grants & Fellowships Committee
  - Michael J. Hogan Foreign Language Fellowship
  - William Appleman Williams Emerging Scholar Research Grants
  - Marilyn Blatt Young Dissertation Completion Fellowship
- Taskforces and Ad-Hoc Committees
  - National Coalition for History delegate
  - Task Force on Internationalization

== Publications ==
=== Diplomatic History ===
Diplomatic History is "devoted to U.S. international history and foreign relations, broadly defined, including grand strategy, diplomacy, and issues involving gender, culture, ethnicity, and ideology." The journal was first published in 1977.

Current Editors: Anne Foster, Indiana State University, and Petra Goedde, Temple University

=== Passport ===
"Passport publishes reviews, historiographical essays, articles on pedagogical issues relating to the teaching of U.S. foreign relations, and research notes, and explores other issues of interest to SHAFR members." It started as the organization's newsletter but is now published on SHAFR's behalf by Oxford University Press. It has three issues per year.

Passport Editor: Andrew Johns, Brigham Young University

Past Editors: Mitchell Lerner, Ohio State University; Peter Hahn, Ohio State University; William Brinker, Tennessee Technological University

=== The SHAFR Guide ===
"The SHAFR Guide Online: An Annotated Bibliography of U.S. Foreign Relations since 1600 is a near-comprehensive, 2.1 million-word online annotated bibliography of historical work covering the entire span of U.S. foreign relations." The publication was originally put together by Robert L. Beisner, and then a second edition was edited by Thomas W. Zeiler. The third edition, The SHAFR Guide, is edited by Alan McPherson, and is available online. It "cover[s] all eras in U.S. history from colonial days through the Barack Obama presidency as well as all geographical areas of the world." These publications are meant to be a helpful starting point for researchers of all ages who are creating a bibliography about diplomatic studies.

== Annual Meetings ==
SHAFR annually hosts an academic conference in June. Every other year, the conference is held in the Washington, D.C. area; in even-numbered years locations vary, and have recently included Philadelphia, PA and New Orleans, LA. The organization also hosted two virtual conferences in 2020 and 2021.

In addition to a variety of discussion panels, the conference feature addresses by experts in foreign relations, including those outside of academia. Recent speakers have included General David Petraeus (KKR Global Institute, 2018), Hoda Hawa (Director of Policy and Advocacy, Muslim Public Affairs Council, 2019), Barbara D. Savage (University of Pennsylvania, 2021), Gry Tina Tinde (International Federation of Red Cross and Red Crescent, Newspeak and Sexual Misconduct, 2022), and Thomas S. Blanton (National Security Archive, 2023). Starting in 2024, the annual Bernath Lecture and the annual SHAFR Presidential Address will be the primary addresses at the conference.

== Awards, Fellowships, and Grants ==
=== Awards ===
- The Stuart L. Bernath Book Prize: Created to recognize research of American foreign relations
- The Stuart L. Bernath Lecture Prize: Created to recognize younger scholars who work in the field of foreign relations.
- The Stuart L. Bernath Scholarly Article Prize: Created to recognize junior scholars with distinguished writing in the field of diplomatic relations.
- The Myrna F. Bernath Book Prize: Created to encourage women and women-identifying scholars to produce work about the history of US foreign relations.
- Robert H. Ferrell Book Prize: Created to recognize distinguished work in the history of America foreign relations.
- The Norman and Laura Graebner Award: Created to recognize the lifetime achievements of senior historians of United States foreign relations.
- The Betty M. Unterberger Dissertation Prize: Created to recognize the work of graduate students in the field of diplomatic history.
- The Oxford University Press USA Dissertation Prize in International History: Created to recognize rising scholars who study international history.
- Robert A. and Barbara Divine Graduate Student Travel Fund: Created to support graduate students who travel to SHAFR's annual meetings.
- Arthur S. Link-Warren F. Kuehl Prize for Documentary Editing: Created to recognize "outstanding collections of primary source materials in the fields of international or diplomatic history."
- The Peter L. Hahn Distinguished Service Award: Created to recognize senior historians who have provided significant contributions to SHAFR during their careers.
- The Michael H. Hunt Prize for International History: Created to recognize scholarship that offers new perspectives on international or global history.
- Anna K. Nelson Prize: Created to recognize outstanding archivists who have demonstrably served scholars of the history of U.S. foreign relations and international history.

=== Fellowships and Grants ===
- Marilyn Blatt Young Dissertation Completion Fellowship: Supports doctoral candidates in the final stage of their dissertation.
- The Stuart L. Bernath Dissertation Research Grant: Underwrites expenses that graduate students have while writing their dissertations.
- The W. Stull Holt Dissertation Fellowship: Defrays travel expenses for students researching their dissertations.
- The Lawrence Gelfand - Armin Rappaport - Walter LaFeber Dissertation Fellowship: Underwrites travel expenses for students researching their dissertations.
- Samuel Flagg Bemis Dissertation Research Grants: Defrays domestic or international travel expenses for students researching their dissertations.
- The Michael J. Hogan Foreign Language Fellowship: Supports graduate students using foreign language sources while researching U.S. foreign relations history.
- William Appleman Williams Emerging Scholar Research Grants: Supports the travel expenses of scholars working on their first monograph and who are within six years of completing their PhD.
- The Myrna F. Bernath Fellowship: Supports women and women-identifying scholars working within U.S. foreign relations history.
