= Hogenson =

Hogenson is a surname. Notable people with the surname include:

- Roald A. Hogenson (1913–1987), American judge
- William Hogenson (1884–1965), American athlete and sprinter

== See also ==
- Hoganson
- Neils Hogenson House
