= Arnold A. Offner =

American historian, and Cornelia F (born 1937)

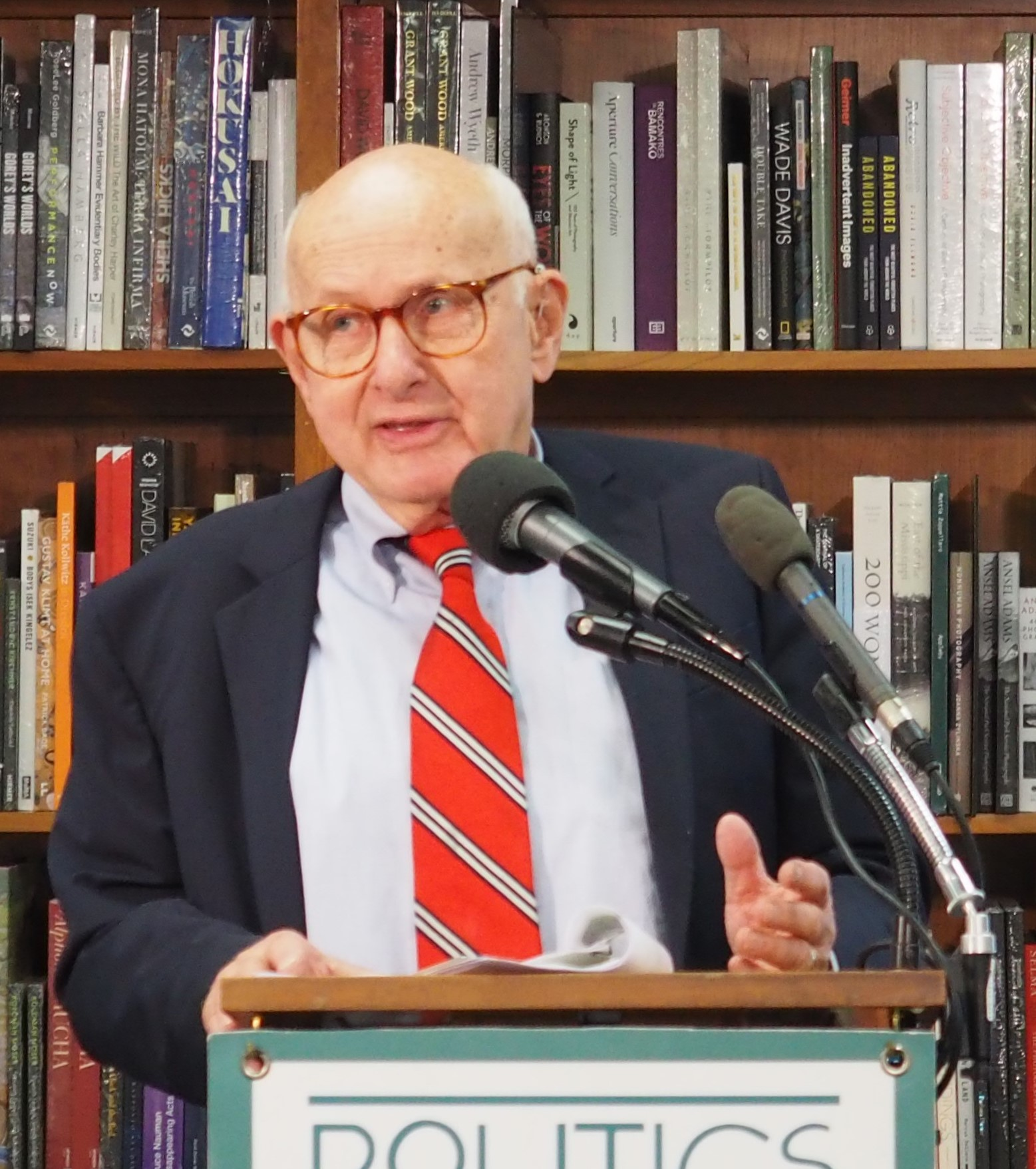
- Born: September 6, 1937 (age 89); Brooklyn
- Occupation: Professor Emeritus
- Spouse(s): Ellen Siegel Offner, m.1962
- Children: Deborah and Michael
- Parent(s): Helen Wolowitz and Samuel Offner
- Relatives: Grandchildren: Julia Roth, Callie, Maddy, and Jason Offner

Academic background
- Education: Columbia College (BA); Indiana University (PhD)
- Doctoral advisor: Robert H. Ferrell

Academic work
- Era: Twentieth Century
- Discipline: History
- Institutions: Syracuse University; Boston University; Lafayette College
- Doctoral students: Jussi Hanhimäki
- Website: www.arnoldaoffner.com

Arnold A. Offner (born September 6, 1937, Brooklyn) is an American historian, and Cornelia F. Hugel Professor of History Emeritus at Lafayette College. He is a past president of the Society for Historians of American Foreign Relations.

== Life ==
Offner grew up in Brooklyn, New York. He earned a B.A. from Columbia College in 1959, and an M.A. in 1960 and Ph.D in 1964 from Indiana University. He taught at Syracuse University, Boston University, and Lafayette College. He has won numerous awards for his scholarship and teaching. He resides in Newton, Massachusetts, with his wife, Ellen.

== Works ==
- Another Such Victory: President Truman and the Cold War, 1945–1953 Stanford, CA: Stanford University Press, 2002. ISBN 9780804747745, OCLC 470193652
- The Origins of the Second World War: American Foreign Policy and World Politics, 1917–1941, New York: Praeger Publishers, 1973. ISBN 9780894643200, OCLC 847437948
- American Appeasement: United States Foreign Policy and Germany, 1933-1938, Cambridge, Massachusetts: Belknap Press of Harvard University Press, 1965; New York: W.W. Norton, 1996. ISBN 9780393008012, OCLC 957963637
- Hubert Humphrey: The Conscience of the Country Yale University Press, 2018. ISBN 9780300222395, OCLC 1024158677
- “How the South Made Hubert Humphrey Care About Race,”
- Offner, Arnold A. (August 1962). "William E. Dodd: Romantic Historian and Diplomatic Cassandra". The Historian. 24 (4): 451–469. doi:10.1111/j.1540-6563.1962.tb01734.x. ISSN 0018-2370.
