= Alexander DeConde =

US diplomatic historian

Alexander DeConde (November 13, 1920, in Utica, New York – May 28, 2016, in Goleta, California) was a historian of United States diplomatic history.

== Life ==
Raised in California, he attended San Francisco State College for his B.A. Following graduation in 1943, he attended the U.S. Naval Reserve Midshipmen School in Chicago, IL. He was assigned to the destroyer tender U.S.S. Whitney (AD-4), and was released from service in 1946. He received his M.A. (1947) and Ph.D. (1949) from Stanford University, where he worked under the direction of Thomas A. Bailey. He taught at Stanford (1947–48), Whittier College (1948–52), and Duke University (1952–57). From 1957 to 1961, he was a professor of history at the University of Michigan. He subsequently joined the history department at the University of California at Santa Barbara, where he remained until his retirement in 1991. He helped to establish the Society for Historians of American Foreign Relations together with Joseph P. O'Grady of LaSalle College (Philadelphia) and David M. Pletcher of Indiana University. DeConde served as the Society's second president and remained actively involved in the organization for the rest of his career. He also held elected and committee roles in the Organization of American History, and served as vice president and president of the Pacific Coast Branch of the American Historical Association.

== Honors and awards ==
- American Philosophical Society
- 1951 Social Science Research Council
- 1959 Guggenheim Fellowship
- 1964 and 1971 Fulbright
- 1988 Inaugural recipient of SHAFR's Norman and Laura Graebner Award for lifetime achievement

== Bibliography ==
- Herbert Hoover's Latin-American Policy (Stanford University Press, 1951)
- "Is China a Great Power?" United States Naval Institute Proceedings Vol 79, Issue 1 (January 1953): 599.
- Isolation and Security: Ideas and Interests in Twentieth-Century American Foreign Policy (Duke University Press, 1957)
- Entangling Alliance: Politics & Diplomacy Under George Washington (Duke University Press, 1958)
- The American Secretary of State: An Interpretation (Praeger, 1962)
- A History of American Foreign Policy (Charles Scribner's Sons, 1963) (second edition, 1971) (third edition, 1978, two volumes)
- The Quasi War: The Politics & Diplomacy of the Undeclared War with France, 1797-1801 (Scribners, 1966)
- Half Bitter, Half Sweet: An Excursion into Italian-American History (Scribners, 1971)
- Student Activism: Town and Gown in Historical Perspective (Scribners, 1971)
- This Affair of Louisiana (Scribners, 1976)
- Encyclopedia of American Foreign Policy: Studies of the Principal Movements and Ideas (editor, 36 editions published between 1978 and 2002)
- Gun Violence in America: The Struggle for Control (Northeastern University Press, 2001)
- Presidential Machismo: Executive Authority, Military Intervention, and Foreign Relations (Northeastern University Press, 2002)
