= Lizabeth Cohen =

American academic

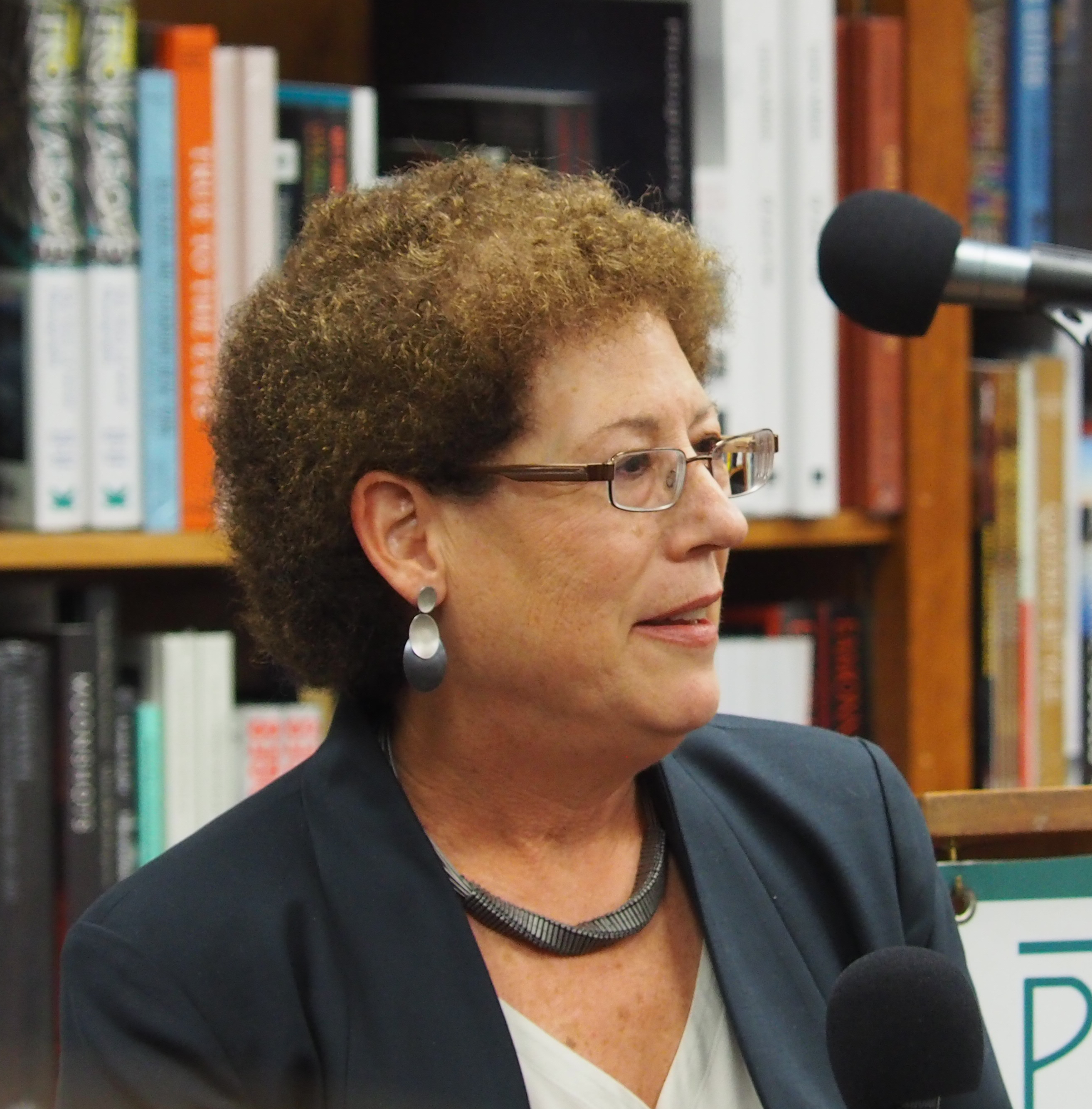
- Education: Princeton University; University of California, Berkeley
- Occupation: Academic
- Employer: Harvard University

Lizabeth Cohen is the current Howard Mumford Jones Professor of American Studies in the History Department at Harvard University, as well as a Harvard University Distinguished Service Professor. From 2011-2018 she served as the Dean of Harvard's Radcliffe Institute for Advanced Study. Currently, she teaches courses in 20th-century America, with a focus on urbanism, the built environment, and public history. She has also served as the Chair of the History Department at Harvard, director of the undergraduate program in history, and director of the Charles Warren Center for Studies in American History, among other administrative duties.

== Life and academic career ==
Born in 1952 in Paramus, New Jersey, Cohen grew up in Bergen County, New Jersey, and in Westchester County, New York. She earned her A.B. degree from Princeton University, and both her M.A. and Ph.D. from the University of California, Berkeley.

Cohen rose from the position of assistant to associate professor at Carnegie Mellon University between 1986 and 1992 and served as associate professor and full professor at New York University between 1992 and 1997, before joining the faculty at Harvard. She was appointed the Harmsworth Professor of American History at Oxford University for the 2007-08 academic year, and is an honorary fellow of Oxford's Rothermere American Institute.

Cohen authored Making a New Deal, a book about the social history of 20th-century American politics. In that book, a case study of Chicago, Cohen argues that working-class urban residents found a common identity as Americans and as New Dealers as the result of their incorporation into a burgeoning mass culture and especially as the result of the devastating effects of the Depression on urban ethnic stores, businesses, and institutions. Cohen also offers a provocative argument about the rise of the Congress of Industrial Organizations during the 1930s. She contends that a working-class "culture of unity" broke down ethnic divisions and animosities and made possible widescale industrial unionization.

Cohen's analysis of working-class popular culture (shopping, movie-going, and radio) during the 1920s was a pioneering effort in the study of vernacular consumerism, a theme that she developed with more of a political focus in her next book, A Consumers' Republic. Through a deeply documented history of urban and suburban New Jersey, embedded in a larger analysis about the transformation of post-New Deal liberalism, Cohen explores the ways that people's identities as consumers shaped their politics after World War II. Building on her interests on architecture, planning, and the built environment, the book is particularly noteworthy for its engagement with earlier work on the politics of suburbanization by scholars like Kenneth T. Jackson. Cohen explores such topics as the rise of shopping malls, the emergence of a consumers' rights movement, and the relationship of consumerism to civil rights activism in the mid-twentieth century. A Consumer's Republic begins with her recollections of growing up in suburban New Jersey and draws from extensive research in archives in the Garden State.

Her most recent book is Saving America’s Cities, which revisits federal urban renewal by following the career of Edward J. Logue, whose shifting approach to the post-World War II urban crisis tracked the changing balance between government-funded public programs and private-sector initiatives. A Yale-trained lawyer and sometime critic of both Robert Moses and Jane Jacobs, Logue saw urban renewal as an extension of the liberal New Deal. He worked to revive a declining New Haven in the 1950s, became the architect of the “New Boston” of the 1960s, and later led the New York State Urban Development Corporation (1968-1975) and the South Bronx Development Organization (1978-1985). Cohen probes the destructiveness of federally funded urban renewal, but also its successes and progressive goals.

== Awards and memberships ==
Cohen has been a Guggenheim Fellow, an American Council of Learned Societies Fellow, a National Endowment for the Humanities grant recipient, a Fellow at the Radcliffe Institute for Advanced Study, and is a Fellow of the Rothermere American Institute, University of Oxford. She is an elected member of the American Academy of Arts and Sciences. She has also served as President of the Urban History Association.

Her 1990 article, "Encountering Mass Culture at the Grassroots: The Experience of Chicago Workers in the 1920s," won the American Studies Association's Constance Rourke Prize for the best article published in the journal American Quarterly. Her 1990 book, Making a New Deal, won the Bancroft Prize in 1991 for the best book published in American history and the Philip Taft Labor History Book Award, and was a finalist for the Pulitzer Prize. In March 2020, she was again awarded the Bancroft Prize for the book Saving America's Cities: Ed Logue and the Struggle to Renew Urban America in the Suburban Age.

Cohen’s 1996 American Historical Review article, “From Town Center to Shopping Center: The Reconfiguration of Community Marketplaces in Postwar America,” won the Urban History Association’s Prize for Best Journal Article in Urban History and the Organization of American Historian’s ABC-CLIO, America: History and Life Award for an article that most advances new perspectives on accepted interpretations or previously unconsidered topics.

Cohen is a member of the Board of Directors of the Payomet Performing Arts Center in Truro, Massachusetts, and the Board of Advisors for the American Repertory Theater in Cambridge, Massachusetts.

== Published works ==
- Making a New Deal: Industrial Workers in Chicago, 1919-1939. New York: Cambridge University Press, 1990. Canto Classics, 2014. ISBN 978-1107431799
- A Consumers' Republic: The Politics of Mass Consumption in Postwar America. New York: Vintage Books, 2003. ISBN 0-375-70737-9
- Saving America’s Cities: Ed Logue and the Struggle to Renew Urban America in the Suburban Age. New York: Farrar, Straus and Giroux, 2019. ISBN 9-780-37425408-7

== The American Pageant ==
- Lizabeth Cohen is one of three co-authors of The American Pageant along with Thomas A. Bailey and David M. Kennedy. This book is a popular AP United States History textbook.
