= Barbara Keys =

American historian

- Born: Albany, New York, U.S.
- Education: Carleton College (BA); University of Washington (MA); Harvard University (AM, PhD)
- Occupations: Historian; professor

Barbara J. Keys is an American historian of U.S. and international history and professor of history at Durham University. She was born in Albany, New York, and grew up in San Francisco. She served as the 2019 president of the Society for Historians of American Foreign Relations.

== Education ==
Keys received her B.A. in history, summa cum laude, from Carleton College in 1987, her M.A. in history from the University of Washington in 1992 and her A.M. in history from Harvard University in 1996. She went on to complete her Ph.D. in history at Harvard University, under the supervision of Akira Iriye and Ernest R. May, in 2001.

== Career ==
Keys taught history at California State University in Sacramento from 2003 through 2005 while she worked on her first book, Globalizing Sport: National Rivalry and International Community in the 1930s. Keys has been a research fellow at the Kennan Institute for Advanced Russian Studies at the Woodrow Wilson International Center for Scholars in Washington, D.C. and at the Leibniz-Institut für Europäische Geschichte in Mainz (2017). Keys has also been a visiting scholar at the Center for the Study of Law and Society at the University of California Berkeley (2009), the Center for European Studies at Harvard University (2012) and the Center for the History of Emotions at the Max Planck Institute for Human Development in Berlin (2016). In 2006 Keys moved to Melbourne, Australia, to teach at the University of Melbourne. Keys's teaching areas consist of 20th century international relations, U.S. foreign relations, U.S. history, the history of human rights, and the Cold War in global perspective. In 2019, Keys was the fifth woman and the first scholar based outside the United States to serve as President of the Society for Historians of American Foreign Relations since the organization's founding in 1969.

=== Academic works ===
Keys is the sole author of two historical books. Her first book, Globalizing Sport: National Rivalry and International Community in the 1930s, was published in 2006 by Harvard University Press. In this book, Keys conducts one of the first large-scale examinations of the political and cultural impact of international sports competitions before World War II. Tracking the transformation of events like the World Cup and the Olympic Games, Keys's examines how and why these events evolved from small-scale occasions into the large-scale, heavily produced, politically impactful and globally watched events they remain today. The book is transnational in scope and nature, focusing on the United States, Nazi Germany, and the Soviet Union in the decades before the Second World War and details how countries of various, and sometimes seemingly oppositional, ideologies were impelled to participate in an emerging global sporting culture. Keys's book argues that, certainly, international sport was manipulated for nationalist purposes, but it was also a vehicle for values such as universalism and individualism that subverted and disrupted nationalist ideologies. The book won several prizes including the 2008 Myrna Bernath Prize from the Society for Historians of American Foreign Relations, the 2006-7 Akira Iriye International History Book Award (co-winner), and two "Best Book" Prizes in 2006 from the Australian Society for Sports History and the International Society for Olympic Historians.

Keys's second book, published by Harvard University Press in 2014, is Reclaiming American Virtue: The Human Rights Revolution of the 1970s. This book investigates the genealogy of the American commitment to international human rights. Keys's book argues that the commitment to the protection and promotion of international human rights in the United States was not a logical extension of American idealism but rather a reaction to national trauma. Framing this commitment as a reaction to the profound disturbance that was the Vietnam War and its traumatic aftermath, the book examines how liberals in the United States sought to morally cleanse the nation by expressing public commitments to human rights. By spotlighting and rallying against human rights abuses, such as torture in South Korea and Chile, liberals in the United States attempted to distance themselves from foreign villains. The enthusiasm for human rights served to move national sentiment away from guilt and restore national pride, obscuring many aspects of America's recent history and limiting the lessons of the Vietnam War to narrow parameters. This book has been reviewed in the New York Review of Books, American Historical Review, Journal of American History, Neue Politische Literatur (Germany), the Ricerche di Storia Politica (Italy), amongst others, and was awarded the 2015 Woodward Medal in Humanities and Social Sciences from the University of Melbourne.

== Awards ==
In 2010 Keys received the Stuart Bernath Lecture Prize, awarded by the Society for Historians of American Foreign Relations. In 2015 Keys was awarded the University of Melbourne's 2015 Woodward Medal in Humanities and Social Sciences for her second book Reclaiming American Virtue.

== Selected publications ==
=== Books ===
- Reclaiming American Virtue: The Human Rights Revolution of the 1970s, Harvard University Press, 2014. Hardcover and Kindle eBook.
- Globalizing Sport: National Rivalry and International Community in the 1930s, Harvard University Press, 2006. Hardcover and paperback.
- The Ideals of Global Sport: From Peace to Human Rights, ed. Barbara Keys. University of Pennsylvania Press, 2019.

=== Journal articles and essays ===
- "Harnessing Human Rights to the Olympic Games: Human Rights Watch and the 1993 'Stop-Beijing' Campaign," The Journal of Contemporary History 53, no. 2 (2018): 415-38. doi: 10.1177/0022009416667791.
- "The Telephone and Its Uses in 1980s U.S. Activism," Journal of Interdisciplinary History, 48, no. 4 (Spring 2018): 485-509. doi.org/10.1162/JINH_a_01196
- "Political Protection: The International Olympic Committee's UN Diplomacy in the 1980s," International Journal of the History of Sport 34, no. 11 (2017): 1161-78. doi.org/10/1080/09523367.2017.1402764.
- "Die Spinne im Netz: Ideenpolitik im Kalten Krieg [The Diplomacy of Ideas in the Cold War]," Zeitschrift für Ideengeschichte 11, no. 4 (Winter 2017): 19-29.
- "The Post-Traumatic Decade: New Histories of the 1970s," coauthor with Jack Davies and Elliott Bannan. Australasian Journal of American Studies 33, no. 1 (July 2014): 1-17.
- "Birth of a New Era: Teaching the 1970s," Australasian Journal of American Studies 33, no. 1 (July 2014): 98-109.
- "Senses and Emotions in the History of Sport," Journal of Sport History 40, no. 1(Spring 2013): 401-17.
- "Henry Kissinger: The Emotional Statesman," Diplomatic History 35, no. 4 (September 2011): 587-609.
- "Congress, Kissinger, and the Origins of Human Rights Diplomacy," Diplomatic History 34, no. 4 (November 2010): 823-51.
- "The Body as a Political Space: Comparing Physical Education under Nazism and Stalinism," German History 27 (2009): 395-413.
- "An African-American Worker in Stalin's Soviet Union: Race and the Soviet Experiment in International Perspective," The Historian 71, no. 1 (Spring 2009): 31-54.
- "Spreading Peace, Democracy, and Coca-Cola: Sport and American Cultural Expansion in the 1930s," Diplomatic History 28, no. 2 (April 2004): 165-96.
- "Soviet Sport and Transnational Mass Culture in the 1930s," The Journal of Contemporary History 38, no. 3 (July 2003): 413-34.
- "The Kissinger Wars," in The American Historian 10 (November 2016): 16-22; reprinted in "Process: A Blog for American History," at www.processhistory.org/the-kissinger-wars/.
