= Richard H. Immerman =

American historian

- Born: April 28, 1949 (age 77); United States
- Occupation: Historian

Academic background
- Education: Cornell University, Boston College

Academic work
- Discipline: History of U.S. Foreign Relations; International History; Cold War America; History of Intelligence

Richard H. Immerman (born April 28, 1949) is an American historian and author. He is currently Marvin Wachman Director Emeritus at the Center for the Study of Force and Diplomacy at Temple University, which he co-founded in 1993 with Russell Weigley, and David Rosenberg. Prior to his chair at Temple University, Immerman served as Assistant Deputy Director of National Intelligence for Analytic Integrity and Standards from 2007 to 2009. Immerman was the 40th president of the Society for Historians of American Foreign Relations.

== Publications ==
- “Life is what happens to you when you’re busy making other plans” Essay Series on Learning the Scholar’s Craft: Reflections of Historians and International Relations Scholars 23 April 2020
- Richard Immerman; Beth Bailey, eds. (2015). Understanding the Wars in Iraq and Afghanistan. New York: NYU Press. p. 368. ISBN 978-1-479-82690-2.
- The Hidden Hand: A Brief History of the CIA. Wiley-Blackwell. 2014. p. 264. ISBN 978-1-444-35136-1.
- Richard Immerman; Petra Goedde, eds. (2013). The Oxford Handbook of the Cold War. Oxford University Press. p. 688. ISBN 978-0-199-23696-1.
- Empire for Liberty: A History of American Imperialism from Benjamin Franklin to Paul Wolfowitz. Princeton University Press. 2010. p. 288. ISBN 978-1-400-83428-0.; 2012: ISBN 978-0691156071
- Richard Immerman; Athan Theoharis, eds. (2006). The Central Intelligence Agency: Security Under Scrutiny. Greenwood Publishing Group. p. 375. ISBN 978-0-313-33282-1.
- John Foster Dulles: Piety, Pragmatism, and Power in U.S. Foreign Policy. Rowman & Littlefield Publishers. 1998. p. 221. ISBN 978-1-461-63801-8.
- Richard Immerman; Robert R. Bowie (1998). Waging Peace: How Eisenhower Shaped an Enduring Cold War Strategy. Oxford University Press. ISBN 978-0-195-06264-9.
- The CIA in Guatemala: The Foreign Policy of Intervention. Austin, Texas, US: University of Texas Press. 1982. ISBN 978-0-292-71083-2.
