= Beyond the White House =

Book (memoir) by Jimmy Carter

Beyond the White House: Waging Peace, Fighting Disease, Building Hope
- Author: Jimmy Carter
- Language: English
- Publisher: Simon & Schuster
- Publication date: October 2007
- Publication place: United States
- Media type: Hardcover
- ISBN: 9781416558804

Beyond the White House is a 2007 book by Jimmy Carter. It describes his activities after leaving the United States presidency in 1981.
