= Hugh Davis Graham =

American historian and sociologist

- Born: September 2, 1936; Little Rock, Arkansas, U.S.
- Died: March 26, 2002 (aged 65); Santa Barbara, California, U.S.
- Education: Yale University; Stanford University
- Occupation: Historian

Hugh Davis Graham (September 2, 1936 – March 26, 2002) was an American historian and sociologist. He was the author of several books about the civil rights movement.

== Early life ==
Graham was born on September 2, 1936, in Little Rock, Arkansas, one of three sons of a Presbyterian minister. He studied history at Yale University and completed a Ph.D. in history at Stanford University in 1964.

== Career ==
From 1967 to 1971 he taught at Johns Hopkins University, where he served as director of the Institute of Southern History. In 1968–69 he co-directed a task force on the history of violence in the United States for President Lyndon Johnson's National Commission on the Causes and Prevention of Violence. He co-edited the task forces's report, Violence in America: Historical and Comparative Perspectives: A Report to the National Commission on the Causes and Prevention of Violence. He taught for 20 years at the University of Maryland, Baltimore County, before moving in 1991 to Vanderbilt University, where he was Holland N. McTyeire Professor of History, dean of the social science division, and later dean of graduate studies and research. He later became an adjunct professor of history at the University of California, Santa Barbara.

Graham's early interest in civil rights and southern politics led him to join Numan Bartley in 1975 in writing Southern Politics and the Second Reconstruction, an update of the classic work by V.O. Key. While teaching at the University of Maryland, he began a new line of scholarship involving the making and implementation of federal policy. These studies led to three major books and a national reputation as the most successful pioneer in the new field of policy history.

His first policy study, The Uncertain Triumph (1984), dealt with the enactment and implementation of major federal aid for public education. Next came his most influential book, The Civil Rights Era (1990), which dealt with the enactment and implementation of the three major civil rights acts. His last policy study, which complemented his work on civil rights, was Collision Course (2002). It showed how early civil rights legislation, intended largely to correct injustices to African Americans, eventually offered protections to immigrant minorities who were among Americans with the highest incomes, revealing "the often unforeseen, or unwanted, effects of social legislation".

== Death ==
Graham died on 26 March 2002 in Santa Barbara, California.

== Partial bibliography ==
- Violence in America: Historical And Comparative Perspectives. Ed. with Ted Robert Gurr. Washington: U.S. Government Printing Office. 1969.
- Huey Long (Great Lives Observed). Prentice Hall. 1970.
- Southern Politics and the Second Reconstruction. With Numan V. Bartley. Johns Hopkins University Press. 1976.
- The Uncertain Triumph: Federal Education Policy in the Kennedy and Johnson Years. University of North Carolina Press. 1984.
- The Civil Rights Era: Origins and Development of National Policy, 1960-1972. Oxford University Press. 1990.
- Collision Course: The Strange Convergence of Affirmative Action and Immigration Policy in America. Oxford University Press. 2003.
- The Rise of American Research Universities: Elites and Challengers in the Postwar Era. With Nancy Diamond. Johns Hopkins University Press. 2004.
