= Kristin L. Hoganson =

American historian

- Citizenship: American
- Education: Yale University (BA); Yale University (PhD)
- Occupation: Historian
- Employer: University of Illinois Urbana-Champaign
- Awards: Ray Allen Billington Prize

Kristin L. Hoganson is an American historian specializing in the history of the United States. She teaches at the University of Illinois at Urbana–Champaign. Hoganson is a 2025 Guggenheim Fellow.

== Early life ==
Hoganson was educated at Yale University receiving her B.A. in 1987 and Ph.D. In 1995.

== Career ==
Hoganson is the Stanley S. Stroup Professor of United States History at the University of Illinois Urbana-Champaign, where she teaches on American empire, the United States in the world, and food in global history.

Hoganson's article, "Meat in the Middle: Converging Borderlands in the U.S. Midwest, 1865-1900," published in the Journal of American History, won the Ray Allen Billington Prize from the Western History Association for the best article in Western History and the Wayne D. Rasmussen Prize from the Agricultural History Society.

Hoganson held the presidency of the Society for Historians of American Foreign Relations. in 2020.

Hoganson was a member of the United States Department of State Historical Advisory Committee until the entire committee was fired in 2025.

== Books ==
- Fighting for American Manhood: How Gender Politics Provoked the Spanish-American and Philippine-American Wars (New Haven: Yale University Press, 1998). ISBN 9780300147872
- Consumers' Imperium:The Global Production of American Domesticity, 1865–1920 (University of North Carolina Press, 2007). ISBN 979-88-908773-4-5
- American Empire at the Turn of the Twentieth Century (Boston: Bedford/St. Martin's, 2016). ISBN 9780312677053
- The Heartland: An American History (New York: Penguin Press, 2019). ISBN 9781594203572
