= A Full Life =

2015 autobiography by Jimmy Carter

A Full Life: Reflections at 90
- Author: Jimmy Carter
- Language: English
- Subject: Autobiography
- Published: 2015 (Simon & Schuster)
- Publication place: United States
- Media type: Print (hardcover), Audiobook (Audio CD)
- Pages: 272
- ISBN: 978-1-5011-1563-9

A Full Life: Reflections at 90 is a memoir written by Jimmy Carter, the 39th president of the United States, released on July 7, 2015. The book is a collection of reflections and memories, including his upbringing, political career, and humanitarian efforts.

== Contents ==
The book begins with President Carter's childhood and early life in the Georgia countryside. It covers his early political career, including his service in the Georgia Senate and his run for the governor's office. The book also provides an in-depth look at President Carter's time in the White House and the difficulties he faced. He divides these difficulties into two categories: "Issues Mostly Resolved" and "Problems Still Pending". The first group includes topics such as Rhodesia, the B-1 bomber, the rescue of New York City and Chrysler, and the end of the Cold War. He touches on the significant SALT II Treaty. Among the issues that remain unresolved, Carter highlights drugs, special interests, the potential for nuclear war, and intelligence agencies. He speaks about Presidents Ronald Reagan, George H. W. Bush, Bill Clinton, and George W. Bush objectively but does not fully absolve them for their actions. The book continues to Carter's post-presidential life, including his work with The Carter Center, his efforts to promote peace and health, and his pastimes: painting, fishing and woodwork.

== Critical reception ==
Upon its release, A Full Life received positive reviews from both critics and readers alike. Many praised Carter for his honesty and straightforwardness in sharing his experiences and reflections. The book was also commended for its historical significance and its contributions to the understanding of modern American politics. Despite some criticism for its lack of depth on certain topics, the book was widely considered to be a fitting tribute to Jimmy Carter's life and legacy.
