= The Hornet's Nest (novel) =

Book by Jimmy Carter

The Hornet's Nest: A Novel of the Revolutionary War
- First edition
- Author: Jimmy Carter
- Language: English
- Genre: Fiction
- Published: 2003 (Simon & Schuster)
- Publication place: United States
- Media type: Print (hardcover); audiobook (audio CD)
- Pages: 465
- ISBN: 978-0-7432-5544-8

The Hornet's Nest: A Novel of the Revolutionary War is a 2003 novel by Jimmy Carter. It features the American Revolutionary War as fought in the Deep South, and is the first fictional publication by any president of the United States.

The New York Times likened Carter's prose to a school teacher delivering a lesson. It praised his "congenial" tone and meticulous descriptions of colonial life but felt the narrative was bogged down by long explanations of political events. In a 2024 retrospective on Carter's life, the Atlanta Journal-Constitution called it "flawed fiction" but still described it as worthy of attention.
