= Thomas A. Bailey =

American historian (1902–1983)

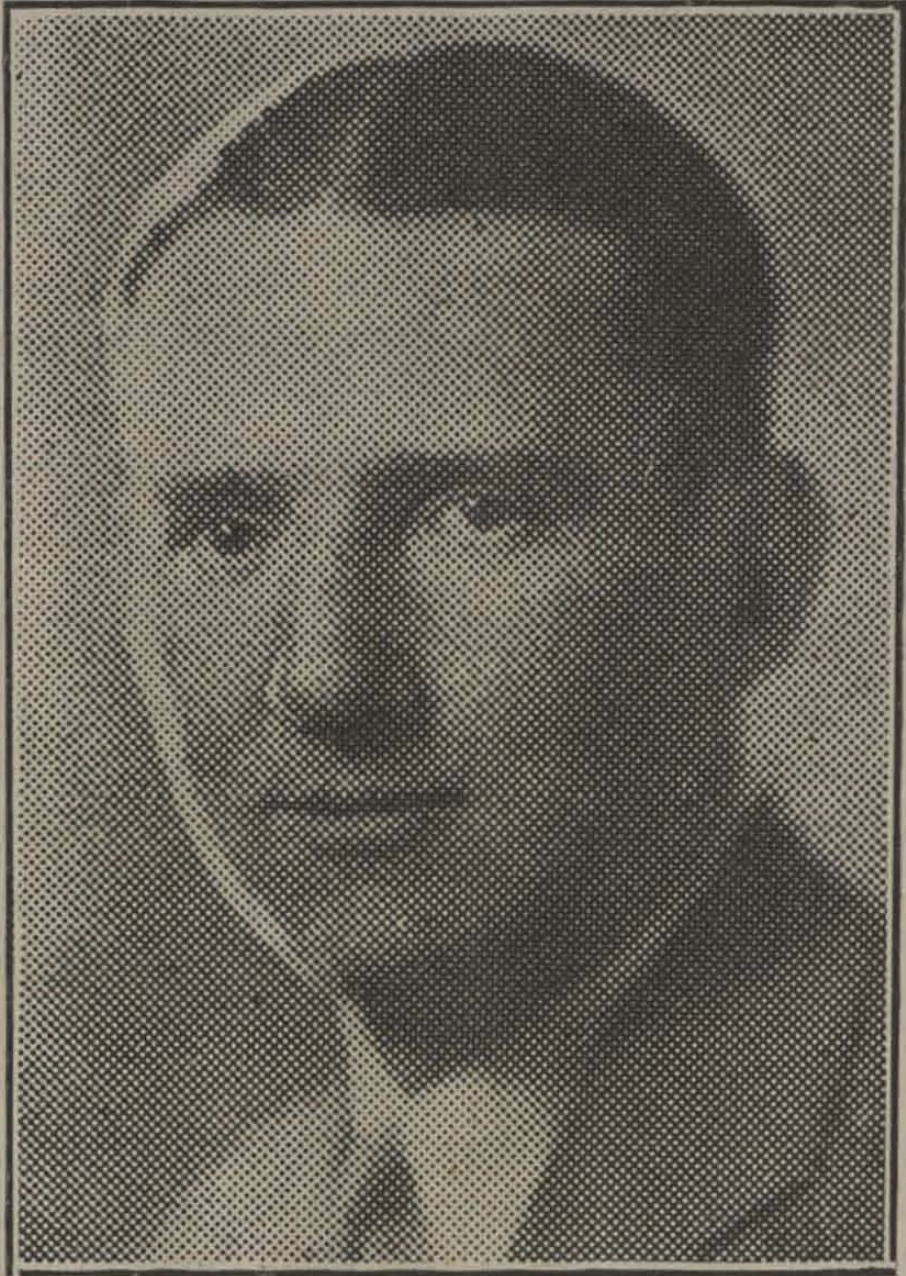
- Clipping from University of Hawaii's student newspaper, Ka Leo o Hawaii, introducing Thomas A. Bailey as a new professor.
- Born: Thomas Andrew Bailey; December 14, 1902 near San Jose, California, U.S.
- Died: July 26, 1983 (aged 80); Menlo Park, California, U.S.
- Scientific career
- Fields: Historian
- Academic advisors: Herbert E. Bolton
- Doctoral students: Alexander DeConde

Thomas Andrew Bailey (December 14, 1902 – July 26, 1983) was a professor of history at his alma mater, Stanford University, and wrote many historical monographs on diplomatic history, as well as the widely used American history textbook The American Pageant. He was known for his witty style and clever terms he coined, such as "international gangsterism." He popularized diplomatic history with his entertaining textbooks and lectures, the presentation style of which followed Ephraim Douglass Adams. Bailey contended foreign policy was significantly affected by public opinion, and that current policymakers could learn from history.

== Early life and education ==
Bailey received his Bachelor of Arts in 1924, Master of Arts in 1925, and Doctor of Philosophy in 1927, all from Stanford University, where he was also elected to Phi Beta Kappa. His doctoral work was in U.S. political history. He switched his emphasis towards diplomatic history while teaching at the University of Hawaiʻi.

== Career ==
After three years at the University of Hawaiʻi, he taught American history for nearly 40 years at Stanford and also served as a visiting professor at Harvard University, Cornell University, the University of Washington, and the National War College in Washington, D.C. He retired in 1968.

Bailey authored a number of articles in the 1930s that indicated the historical techniques he would use throughout his career. While not groundbreaking, they remain noteworthy for the care with which Bailey systematically overturned received myths about U.S. diplomatic history by a careful reexamination of the underlying sources. His first book was a study of the diplomatic crisis over racial issues between the United States and Japan during the Theodore Roosevelt administration.

He delivered the Albert Shaw Lectures on Diplomatic History at Johns Hopkins University on the Wilson administration's policy towards neutral nations in 1917–1918, later published in 1942. While the impact of public opinion on the making of foreign policy was a theme that ran through most of his works, he laid it out most clearly in The Man in the Street, published in 1948.

Perhaps the harshest attack on Wilson's diplomacy came from Bailey in two books that remain widely cited by scholars, Woodrow Wilson and the Lost Peace (1944) and Woodrow Wilson and the Great Betrayal (1945). According to historian Scot D. Bruce, Bailey

contended that Wilson's wartime isolationism, as well as his peace proposals at war's end, were seriously flawed. Highlighting the fact that American delegates encountered staunch opposition to Wilson's proposed League of Nations, Bailey concluded that the president and his diplomatic staff essentially sold out, compromising important American ideals to secure mere fragments of Wilson's progressive vision. Hence, while Bailey primarily targeted President Wilson in these critiques, others ... did not emerge unscathed.

He trained more than 20 doctoral students in his career.

He was married to Sylvia Dean, daughter of a former University of Hawaiʻi president.

=== Honors and awards ===
In 1960 he served as president of the Pacific Coast Branch of the American Historical Association. In 1968, he was elected to the presidencies of both the Organization of American Historians and the Society for Historians of American Foreign Relations. The Commonwealth Club of California awarded him gold medals in 1940 for his Diplomatic History of the American People and 1944 for his Woodrow Wilson and the Lost Peace.

== Bibliography ==
- Theodore Roosevelt and the Japanese-American Crisis: An Account of the International Complications Arising from the Race Problems on the Pacific Coast (Stanford: Stanford University Press, 1934).
- The American Pageant (1956) (18 editions by 2025)
- "The Sinking of the Lusitania." The American Historical Review, Volume 41, Number 1 (October, 1935), pages 54–73 in JSTOR
- A Diplomatic History of the American People (1940, and reprinted through 10th edition in 1980)
- The Policy of the United States Toward the Neutrals, 1917–1918 (Johns Hopkins University Press, 1942)
- The Man in the Street: The Impact of American Public Opinion on Foreign Policy (New York, 1948)
- Woodrow Wilson and the Lost Peace (New York, 1944)
- Woodrow Wilson and the Great Betrayal (New York, 1945)
- Wilson and the Peacemakers (New York, 1947) [This single volume combined the two earlier Wilson volumes into one]
- America Faces Russia: Russian-American Relations from Early Times to Our Day (Ithaca, New York: Cornell University Press, 1950)
- The Lusitania Disaster (1975) co-authored with Captain Paul B. Ryan
- The American Pageant Revisited (1982) the autobiography of Thomas A. Bailey
- Presidential Greatness (1966)
- The Pugnacious Presidents (1980)
- Presidential Saints and Sinners (1981)
