= Mary L. Dudziak =

American historian (born 1956)

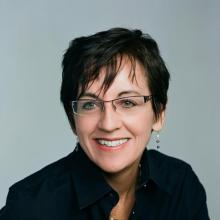
- Born: June 15, 1956 (age 70); Oakland, California, U.S.
- Education: University of California, Berkeley; Yale Law School
- Occupations: Law professor, legal theorist, civil rights historian
- Known for: History of the civil rights movement, foreign policy and international relations expert
- Website: www.marydudziak.com

Mary Louise Dudziak (born June 15, 1956) is an American legal theorist, civil rights historian, educator, and a leading foreign policy and international relations expert. She is the Asa Griggs Candler Professor of Law at Emory University.

Her research has examined the intersection of race, civil rights, and the surprising influence of Cold War politics in accelerating the passage of the Civil Rights Act of 1964. Dudziak is also a leading biographical scholar of former Supreme Court Justice Thurgood Marshall. Her work has examined his role and influence in spreading American legal ideals and values abroad.

== Career ==
Before joining Emory University, Dudziak was the Judge Edward J. and Ruey L. Guirado Professor of Law, History and Political Science at the University of Southern California Gould School of Law, where she held joint appointments in USC's Department of History and Political Science. Prior to USC Law, she was a professor of Law and History at the University of Iowa, and a law clerk for Judge Sam J. Ervin, III, of the Fourth US Circuit Court of Appeals. Dudziak has also been a distinguished visiting law professor at Harvard University, Duke University, and at the University of Maryland.

== Publications ==
- Cold War Civil Rights: Race and the Image of American Democracy (2000)
- September 11 in History: A Watershed Moment? (2003)
- Legal Borderlands: Law and the Construction of American Borders (2006)
- Exporting American Dreams: Thurgood Marshall's African Journey (2011)
- War Time: An Idea, Its History, Its Consequences (2012)
- Cold War Civil Rights: The Relationship between Civil Rights and Foreign Affairs in the Truman Administration (1992) (dissertation)
