= Diplomatic History (journal) =

Academic journal

- Discipline: History of foreign relations of the United States
- Language: English
- Edited by: Anne L. Foster and Petra Goedde

Publication details
- History: 1977–present
- Publisher: Oxford University Press on behalf of the Society for Historians of American Foreign Relations
- Frequency: 5/year
- Impact factor: 0.529 (2020)

Standard abbreviations
- ISO 4: Dipl. Hist.

Indexing
- ISSN: 0145-2096 (print); 1467-7709 (web)
- LCCN: 77649292
- OCLC no.: 469947155

Links
- Journal homepage; Online access; Online archive; Journal page at University of Colorado Boulder

Diplomatic History is a peer-reviewed academic journal covering the foreign relations history of the United States. It is the official journal of the Society for Historians of American Foreign Relations and is published by Oxford University Press. The journal was established in 1977, and publishes five issues a year.

The current editors-in-chief are Anne L. Foster, Indiana State University, and Petra Goedde, Temple University. Alan McPherson serves as the associate editor.

According to the Journal Citation Reports, the journal had a 2020 impact factor of 0.529.

== Past editors ==
- Armin Rappaport, University of California, San Diego, 1977–1979
- Paul S. Holbo, University of Oregon, interim editor, 1977?
- Judith W. Smith, University of California, San Diego, associate editor, 1979?
- Warren I. Cohen, Michigan State University, editor, 1980–??
- George C. Herring, University of Kentucky, editor, 1984?–1986
- Robert Seager II, University of Kentucky, associate editor, 1984?–1986
- Michael J. Hogan, Ohio State University, editor, 1987–2001
- Jeffrey P. Kimball, Miami University, associate editor, 1987–1990
- David S. McLellan, Miami University, associate editor, 1987–1990
- William O. Walker III, Ohio Wesleyan University, associate editor, 1991–1992
- Peter L. Hahn, Ohio State University, associate editor, 1991–2001
- Mary Ann Heiss, Ohio State University, associate editor, 1991–2001
- Robert D. Schulzinger, University of Colorado, Boulder, editor-in-chief, 2002–2012
- Thomas W. Zeiler, University of Colorado, Boulder, executive editor, 2002–2012; Editor, 2013–2014
- Nathan J. Citino, Colorado State University, associate editor, 2002–2014
- Kenneth A. Osgood, Colorado School of Mines, associate editor, 2013–2014
- Nick Cullather, Indiana University, editor, 2015–2019
- Anne Foster, Indiana State University, editor, 2015–present
- Petra Goedde, Temple University, editor, 2020–present
- Alan McPherson, Temple University, associate editor, 2020–present

== Past publishers ==
- Scholarly Resources, 1977–1995
- Blackwell, 1995–2009
- Wiley, 2009–2012
- Oxford University Press, 2013–present
