= James Green (historian) =

American historian (1944–2016)

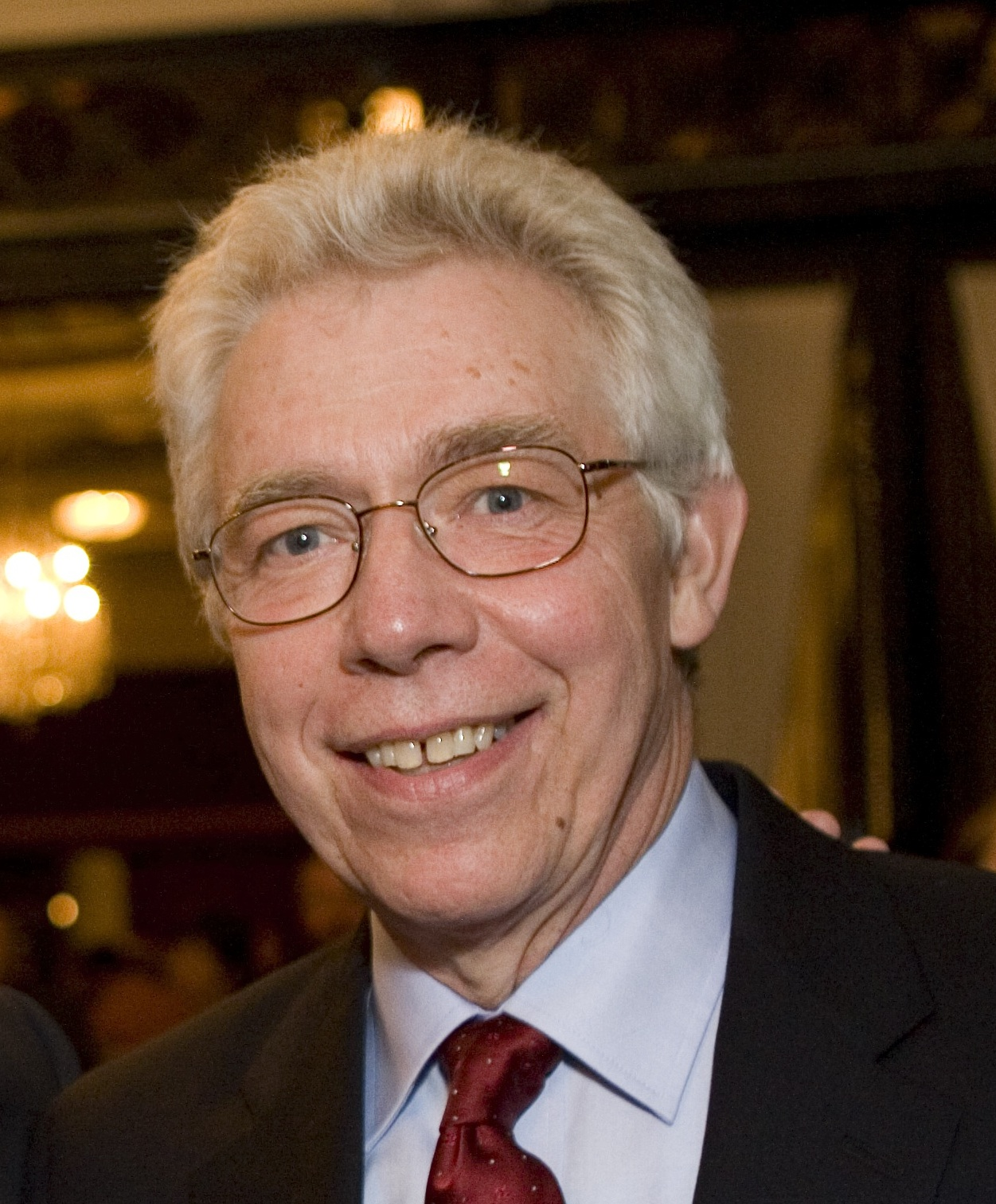
- Born: James Robert Green; November 4, 1944; Oak Park, Illinois, U.S.
- Died: June 23, 2016 (aged 71); Boston, Massachusetts, U.S.
- Education: Northwestern University (B.A.); Yale University (Ph.D.)
- Occupation: Historian
- Years active: 1968–2016
- Employer: University of Massachusetts Boston
- Known for: Academic work in the field of organized labor
- Title: Professor of History Emeritus
- Spouse: Janet Grogan (m. 1988)
- Children: 1 son
- Website: http://www.jamesgreenworks.com/

James Robert Green (November 4, 1944 – June 23, 2016) was an American historian, author, and labor activist. He was Professor of History Emeritus at the University of Massachusetts Boston.

== Early life and education ==
Green was born in 1944, to Gerald and Mary Green in Oak Park, Illinois, a suburb of Chicago.

In 1966, he received a bachelor's degree from Northwestern University. During his time at Northwestern, Green was deeply influenced by three seminal events of 1963: President John F. Kennedy's civil rights address on national television on June 11; the assassination of civil rights leader Medgar Evers later that same evening; Martin Luther King Jr.'s "I Have a Dream" speech at the March on Washington for Jobs and Freedom on August 28; and the assassination of President Kennedy on November 22. Green interned in the summer of 1965 and 1966 in the office of U.S. Senator from Illinois Paul Douglas.

While working in the nation's capital, Green met U.S. Senator from Minnesota Eugene McCarthy, and later worked on McCarthy's 1968 presidential campaign.

Green entered Yale University to work on his doctorate in 1966. He was a member of the Student Strike Coordinating Committee which led a mass rally, teach-in and demonstration on May 1, 1970. More than 15,000 people jammed the Yale campus from Friday through Sunday to protest the arrest and murder trial of Black Panther leader Bobby Seale.

== Academic career ==
In the fall of 1970, Green was appointed an assistant professor of history at Brandeis University.

When the magazine Radical America moved from Madison, Wisconsin, to Boston in 1971, Green began writing for the former SDS-run publication, Radical America. An influential 1974 Radical America article by Green and co-author Allen Hunter outlining the history of school desegregation in Boston prior to the 1974 school-busing crisis, "Racism and Busing in Boston."

Green received his Ph.D. from Yale in 1972. Green studied under the legendary historian C. Vann Woodward, and became acquainted with the leftist historians Eric Hobsbawm and Herbert Gutman. During this time he also was involved in the anti-war movement, which eventually sparked his interest in the history of radicalism in the United States.

Green took a position as a lecturer in history at the University of Warwick during the 1975 to 1976 term. He became involved in the British History Workshop, a group of historians who focused research on workers and local movements rather than national trends, markets and large organizations. Green's subsequent work was heavily influenced by the practices of the History Workshop, and he became an active proponent of the "new labor history" movement in the U.S.

In 1977, Green left Brandeis and was appointed an associate professor of history and labor studies in the College of Public and Community Service at the University of Massachusetts Boston. (He was a full professor until he retired in 2014.) In December of that year and into early 1978, Green worked in West Virginia, covering a national strike by coal miners who had defied (for a few days) a Taft-Hartley Act back-to-work order by President Jimmy Carter.

In 1978, Green co-founded the Massachusetts History Workshop with Susan Reverby and Martin Blatt, two other Boston-area labor historians. The project brought workers and academics together to explore labor history and to identify common concerns and issues. He wrote a number of articles on this effort to democratize social history as well as a number of reflections in his autobiographical book "Taking History to Heart." The project folded in the late 1980s. Oral histories the Workshop collected are now housed at the Schlesinger Library at the Radcliffe Institute for Advanced Study at Harvard.

Green's interest in radicalism and his experiences in West Virginia led him to become involved in the American labor movement in the 1980s. In 1981, he created a labor studies major at UMass-Boston, and started teaching leadership training workshops for unions such as the United Mine Workers of America. In 1995, Green founded the Labor Resource Center at the University of Massachusetts Boston.

In 1987, in addition to continuing on the faculty at UMass-Boston, Green was named a lecturer at the Harvard Trade Union Program (now called the Labor and Worklife Program) at Harvard Law School.

In 1998, Green was named a Fulbright scholar and taught at the University of Genoa in Italy.

In the spring of 2008, Green left the College of Public and Community Service and joined the History Department at University of Massachusetts Boston where he directed the Master of Arts program in Public History until 2014.

== Documentary film work ==
Green's interest in labor history and involvement in the American labor movement has led him to become involved with a number of documentary films.

In 1989, Green was supporting coal miners who had struck the Pittston Coal Group. Documentary film-maker Barbara Kopple, commissioned to create a centennial history of the United Mine Workers, was there filming the strike and employed Green as a consultant. The film became Out of Darkness: The Mine Workers' Story. He received an associate producer credit on the picture.

In 1992 and 1993, Green worked as a research director and consultant on "The Great Depression," an award-winning seven-part documentary series produced by Blackside, Inc. which aired on PBS. Afterward, he served on the community advisory board of local Boston public television station, WGBH, from 1993 to 1994.

From 1995 to 1996, Green served as a consultant to the film The Fight in the Fields: Cesar Chavez and the Farm Workers. The film later aired on PBS.

In 2014 the producers of the PBS series American Experience secured the rights to Green's forthcoming book (Publication Date: Feb. 2015) on the West Virginia Mine Wars. The book, The Devil is Here in these Hills, will be the basis of documentary film produced by The Film Posse in Boston. The program will air nationwide in 2016.

== Research ==
Green's research focuses on radical political and social movements in the U.S. (including new social movements), as well as the history of labor unions in the United States. Green writes social and political history from "the bottom up." He writes from a leftist theoretical standpoint.

One of Green's earliest published works, The World of the Worker, is noted for its revisionist take on American labor history. The work came about after historian Eric Foner challenged Green to write the history of the American labor movement from a new labor history or rank-and-file perspective.

Green's 2000 book, Taking History to Heart, had a deep impact in the academic history community. The book is a semi-autobiographical account of the role historical awareness plays in forging powerful, effective social movements. Writing in a colloquial style, Green discussed how important historical events such as the Haymarket riot, the Bread and Roses strike, and the civil rights movement influenced his own life. He vividly describes these events, and ended up not only writing popular historical narratives but showed how those stories encouraged his own participation in various causes. In many ways, the book is a written example of Green's lifelong struggle to take history out of the ivory tower and make it come alive and be relevant to working people and community activists. The book received praise from academics for encouraging the reconnection of academia to society.

In 2006, Green published Death in the Haymarket, a popular history of the Haymarket riot. Although not noted for its path-breaking research, the book was a best-seller that was reviewed favorably in various publications like The New Yorker, The Nation, Chicago Tribune, and was chosen by The Progressive as one of the best non-fiction books of the year.

Green's next book, The Devil is Here in these Hills: West Virginia's Coal Miners and their Battle for Freedom was published by Grove Atlantic in 2015.

== Memberships and awards ==
=== Awards ===
Green has been the recipient of a number of awards and honors. He was a Woodrow Wilson Foundation fellow in 1966, and he received a grant from the National Endowment for the Humanities in 1977 to deliver a series of public lectures on Boston-area labor unions.

In 1977, Green's article, "Tenant Farmer Discontent and Socialist Protest in Texas," won Southwestern Historical Quarterly magazine's H. Bailey Carroll Award for the best article published by the journal during the preceding year.

In 1983, Green's introduction to the reprint edition of Oscar Ameringer's autobiography, If You Don't Weaken, received the Bryant Spann Memorial Prize from the Eugene V. Debs Foundation as the best scholarly work of the year concerning social reform or radical activism.

In 2009, The Sidney Hillman Foundation presented Green with the Sol Stetin award for his achievements in the field of labor history, "researching and telling the stories of working people's lives."

=== Memberships and professional positions ===
From 1971 until the magazine's demise in 1999, Green was part of the editorial collective which oversaw the journal Radical America, and he was a frequent contributor to the publication. In 1995, Green founded the Labor Resource Center at UMass-Boston.

Green is a member of the Labor and Working-Class History Association (LAWCHA). He was a vice president of LAWCHA from 2001 to 2003 and its president from 2003 to 2005.

From 2001 to 2002, Green was an associate editor at Labor History. In February 2004, Green helped organize a revolt by the entire editorial board of the journal Labor History. The editorial board as well as much of the staff left that publication after a disagreement with publisher Taylor and Francis over the direction of the journal. According to Leon Fink, the former editor of Labor History, the principal issue was maintaining the journal's editorial independence. Green helped negotiate an agreement which led to the founding of Labor: Studies in Working-Class History of the Americas, which is co-published by LAWCHA and Duke University Press. He served as an associate editor of the new journal until 2009

Green is the former board president of The Welcome Project (TWP) in Somerville, MA. TWP is an organization that works with immigrants and refugees in the city of Somerville.

Green has been a member of the Organization of American Historians since 1970. In 2008, he joined the OAH's Distinguished Lecturer program and in 2014 he joined the editorial board of OAH's The Journal of American History.

Green was a Full Professor of History at the University of Massachusetts Boston from 1981 to 2014.

== Personal life ==
Green married Janet Grogan in 1987, the couple have one son.

== Death ==
Green died in Boston on June 23, 2016, of complications from leukemia. He was 71.

== Bibliography ==
=== Solely authored books ===
- (1978) Grass-Roots Socialism: Radical Movements in the Southwest, 1895-1943 (Baton Rouge: Louisiana State University Press) (ISBN 0-8071-0773-5), an expansion of his Yale PhD dissertation, nominated for the Organization of American Historians' 1978 Frederick Jackson Turner Award.
- (1998) The World of the Worker: Labor in Twentieth Century America (Paperback reprint ed- first published in 1980) (Champaign, Ill.: University of Illinois Press) (ISBN 0-252-06734-7)
- (2000) Taking History to Heart: The Power of the Past in Building Social Movements (Amherst: University of Massachusetts Press) (ISBN 1-55849-241-0)
- (2006) Death in the Haymarket: A Story of Chicago, the First Labor Movement and the Bombing that Divided Gilded Age America (New York: Pantheon Books) (ISBN 0-375-42237-4)
- (2015) The Devil is Here in These Hills: West Virginia's Coal Miners and Their Battle for Freedom (New York: Grove Atlantic) (ISBN 978-0-8021-2331-2)

=== Co-authored books ===
- (1975) The South End by Katie Kenneally and James R. Green, vol 14 of the Boston 200 Neighborhood Histories Project
- (1979) Boston's Workers: A Labor History by James Green & Hugh C. Donahue (Boston: Boston Public Library) (ISBN 0-89073-056-3)
- (1996) Commonwealth of Toil: Chapters from the History of Massachusetts Workers and Their Unions by Tom Juravich, James Green & William Hartford (Amherst, Mass.: University of Massachusetts Press) (ISBN 1-55849-045-0)

=== Solely edited books ===
- (1983) Workers' Struggles, Past and Present: A 'Radical America' Reader (Philadelphia: Temple University Press) (ISBN 0-87722-293-2)

=== Solely authored articles ===
- (1973, August) "The Brotherhood of Timber Workers, 1910-1913: A Radical Response to Industrial Capitalism in the Southern U.S.A" Past and Present No. 60
- (1978, July/August) "Holding the Line: Miners' Militancy and the 1977-78 Coal Strike" Radical America 12:4
- (1977, October) "Tenant Farmer Discontent and Socialist Protest in Texas" Southwestern Historical Quarterly 81:2
- (1989) "Workers, Unions, and the Politics of Public History" The Public Historian 11:2
- (1993, August) "Democracy Comes to Little Siberia: Steel Worker Organizing in Aliquippa, Pennsylvania, 1933-1937" Labor's Heritage 5:3
- (2003) "Howard Zinn's History," Chronicle of Higher Education May 23, 2003
- (2004, Spring) "Crime Against Memory at Ludlow" Labor: Studies in Working Class History of the Americas 1:1

=== Co-authored articles ===
- (1974, November/December) "Racism and Busing in Boston" by James Green & Allen Hunter Radical America. 8:6

=== Solely authored book chapters ===
- (1983) "Introduction." In "If You Don't Weaken: The Autobiography of Oscar Ameringer" by Oscar Ameringer (Reprint edition) (Norman: University of Oklahoma Press) (ISBN 0-8061-1861-X)
- (1996) "Tying the Knot of Solidarity: The Pittston Strike of 1989-1990" In United Mine Workers of America: A Model of Industrial Solidarity? by John H.M. Laslett, (ed. University Park, Pa.: Pennsylvania State University Press), (ISBN 0-271-01537-3)

=== Co-authored book chapters ===
- (1990) "The Long Strike: The Practice of Solidarity Among Boston Packinghouse Workers, 1954-55" by James Green & Jim Bollen, In Labor in Massachusetts 1788–1988, Selected Essays. by Martin Kaufman and Kenneth Fones-Wolf, (eds. Westfield, Mass.: Institute for Massachusetts Studies)

== Bibliography ==
- Ackerman, John A. "The Impact of the Coal Strike of 1977-1978." Industrial and Labor Relations Review. 32:2 (January 1979).
- Brisbin Jr. Richard A. A Strike Like No Other Strike: Law and Resistance During the Pittston Coal Strike of 1989-1990. Baltimore: Johns Hopkins University Press, 2002. (ISBN 0-8018-6901-3)
- James Green bio, James Green Web site
- James Green, Labor Resource Center, College of Public and Community Service, UMass-Boston
- Simpich, Bill. "Lessons from the 1970 Student Strike: Building a Movement That Will Be Stronger After the US Is Out of Iraq." Counterpunch. May 18, 2006.
- Who's Who in America. 58th ed. New Providence, N.J.: Marquis Who's Who, 2004. (ISBN 0-8379-6977-8)
