= Labor and Working-Class History Association =

US non-profit organization

- Abbreviation: LAWCHA
- Formation: 1998
- President: James Gregory
- Vice President: Julie Greene
- National Secretary: Cecelia Bucki
- Treasurer: Liesl Orenic
- Board of directors: Lilia Fernandez, Ken Fones-Wolf, Max Krochmal, Talitha LeFlouria, Naomi Williams, Michael Innis-Jimenez, LaShawn Harris, Jennifer Scherer, Nikki Mandell, Toby Higbie, Colin J. Davis, Keona K. Ervin, Sonia Hernandez, Emily E. LB. Twarog, Lane Windham
- Key people: Leon Fink
- Publication: Labor: Studies in Working-Class History
- Award: Philip Taft Labor History Book Award
- Website: lawcha.org

The Labor and Working-Class History Association (LAWCHA) is a non-profit association of academics, educators, students, and labor movement and other activists that promotes research into and publication of materials on the history of the labor movement in North and South America. Its current president is James Gregory, professor of history at University of Washington.

LAWCHA works to create and sustain relationships with labor unions, workers' groups and community activist organizations, and to make labor history more accessible to union members and other workers. LAWCHA also works to promote the teaching of workers' history in public elementary and secondary schools, and seeks to foster the preservation of historic sites important to the labor movement.

== History ==
LAWCHA was founded in 1998. At the time, various labor scholars felt that existing professional organizations, while effective and worthwhile in their own way, did not focus on labor history and lacked an emphasis on workers and local worker organizations. Conversations about forming a new organization occurred on various listservs, especially, H-Labor, part of H-Net.

At a caucus of interested historians at the 1997 North American Labor History Conference in Detroit, Michigan, participants decided to form a new association. An organizing committee, chaired by Elizabeth Faue and Julie Greene, and a constitution and by-laws committee, led by John Bukowczyk and Roger Horowitz, were formed. A constitution was drafted in late 1997 and early 1998, and the organizing committee debated the constitution in mid-1998.

The organizing committee presented the draft constitution to the founding members of LAWCHA at the 1998 North American Labor History Conference. The constitution was approved, and LAWCHA officially founded. Jacquelyn Dowd Hall (University of North Carolina at Chapel Hill) was elected LAWCHA's first president and Joe W. Trotter, Jr. (Carnegie Mellon University) its first vice-president.

LAWCHA grew steadily throughout 1999, and held its first public meetings as part of a panel at the 1999 North American Labor History Conference. LAWCHA quickly began hosting an extensive program of activities at various history conferences in the U.S. and Canada.

LAWCHA's other past presidents have included former James Green, Alice Kessler-Harris, Michael Honey, Shelton Stromquist, and Nancy MacLean.

== Organizational structure ==
Membership in LAWCHA is essentially open to the public, although as of late 2006 most members were academics or labor union members.

LAWCHA is technically governed by its membership, which meets annually in conjunction with the organization's annual conference. In practice, the members delegate authority to the board of directors and the executive committee.

LAWCHA's members elect four officers: A president, vice-president, treasurer and secretary. Officers serve two-year terms, and the president and vice-president are term-limited to one term only. Ordinarily, the vice-president succeeds the president, who then stays on the executive committee as immediate past president. LAWCHA's executive offices at Duke University; the executive secretary and sole staff person of the organization is a history department graduate student.

LAWCHA members also elect a board of directors of fifteen individuals. One-third of the board is up for re-election each year. The four officers, executive secretary, and the immediate past-president of LAWCHA also serve on the board. The officers and executive secretary constitute an executive committee, which governs the organization between meetings of the membership and the board of directors.

== Publications ==
LAWCHA publishes a scholarly journal and a newsletter. The membership newsletter began publication in 2005 and now appears once a year, under the editorship of Rosemary Fuerer. Under LAWCHA's auspices, Fuerer also maintains a teaching-focused labor history bibliography.

LAWCHA's second publication is Labor: Studies in Working-Class History of the Americas, which began publication in 2005 as well. In February 2004, the entire editorial board and much of the staff of the journal Labor History left that publication after a disagreement with publisher Taylor and Francis over the direction of the journal. According to Leon Fink, the former editor of Labor History, the principal issue was maintaining the journal's editorial independence. LAWCHA's then-president, James Green negotiated an agreement which led to the founding of Labor: Studies in Working-Class History of the Americas. Labor is co-published by LAWCHA and Duke University Press.

Labor: Studies in Working-Class History of the Americas received the 2005 award for "Best New Journal" from the Council of Editors of Learned Journals. The award was given to the best new academic journal to start publication in the previous three years. The journal was renamed Labor: Studies in Working-Class History in 2016.

== Past Presidents ==
- Jacquelyn Dowd Hall, University of North Carolina at Chapel Hill, first president.
- Joe W. Trotter, Jr., Carnegie Mellon University
- James Green, University of Massachusetts, Boston
- Alice Kessler-Harris, Columbia University
- Michael Honey, University of Washington, Tacoma
- Kimberley Phillips, Brooklyn College – CUNY
- Shelton Stromquist, University of Iowa
- Nancy MacLean, Duke University
- James Gregory, University of Washington
- Julie Greene, University of Maryland at College Park
- William P. Jones, University of Minnesota
- James Robert Green, University of Massachusetts Boston (2003-2005)
- Cindy Hahamovitch, University of Georgia (2021-2023)
- Joseph A. McCartin, Georgetown University (current president, 2024-)

== Conferences ==
LAWCHA sponsors and co-sponsors conferences around the country. In 2005 and 2006, it cosponsored Wayne State University's North American Labor History Convention in Detroit; in May 2007 it co-sponsored the Southern Labor History Conference at Duke; in June 2008 it co-sponsored the 40th annual convention of the Pacific Northwest Labour History Association in Vancouver; and in May 2009 it met in Chicago with Archie Green's Laborlore group. In Spring 2010 LAWCHA met in conjunction with the annual conference of the Organization of American Historians in Washington. In Spring 2011 LAWCHA met in Atlanta, Georgia, in conjunction with the Southern Labor Studies Association. In June 2013, LAWCHA hosted a conference in New York City. In May 2015, LAWCHA co-sponsored a conference with The Working Class Studies Association at Georgetown University in Washington, D.C. In 2016, LAWCHA co-sponsored panels at the Organization of American Historians conference in Providence, RI. In June 2017, LAWCHA hosted a conference at the University of Washington in Seattle.

In addition, LAWCHA's program committee organizes and cosponsors panels at various other academic conferences.

== Awards given ==
Each year, LAWCHA awards a Graduate Research Essay Prize to the best paper by a graduate student presented at the North American Labor History Conference. In 2007 it inaugurated the Herbert Gutman Prize for Outstanding Dissertation in U.S. Labor and Working-Class History. Also starting in 2007 it began a collaboration with Cornell University, and the Philip Taft Labor History Book Award is now given by Cornell in cooperation with LAWCHA. Finally, LAWCHA occasionally gives a prize for "distinguished service to labor and working-class history." The first was given in 2007 to David Montgomery; in 2008 the organization honored David Brody.

== See also ==
- Wisconsin Labor History Society
- Illinois Labor History Society
