= Kyes =

Kyes is a surname. Notable people with the surname include:

- James E. Kyes (1906–1943), American naval officer
- Katharine Kyes Leab (1941–2020), American publisher
- Nancy Kyes (born 1949), American actress
- Roger M. Kyes (1906–1971), American business executive, and US Deputy Secretary of Defense, 1953
