= Leab =

Leab may refer to:

== People ==
- Daniel Leab (1936–2016), American historian
- Katharine Kyes Leab (1941–2020), American publisher

== Places ==
- Albacete Airport, by ICAO code
