= Hoac =

Hoac, or variations, may refer to:

- An abbreviation of the chemical compound of Acetic acid
- HOAC, predecessor to Diamond Aircraft Industries
- Historians of American Communism, a scholarly historical organization established in 1982
- Hillingdon Outdoor Activity Centre, in the London Borough of Hillingdon
