= Julie Greene (historian) =

American historian (born 1956)

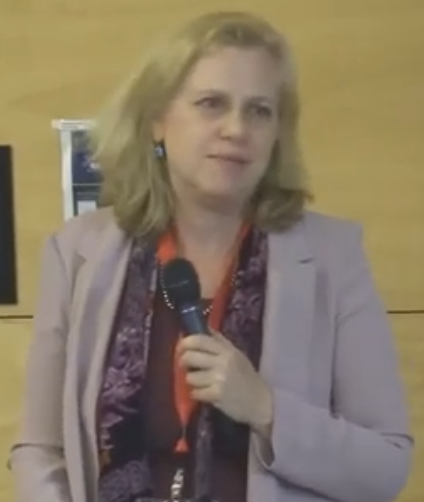
- At LAWCHA Conference 2017
- Born: 1956 (age 69–70)

Academic background
- Education: University of Michigan (BA); University of Cambridge at Murray Edwards College (MA); Yale University (PhD)

Academic work
- Discipline: Labor history
- Sub-discipline: Transnational history, global labor history, American immigration history
- Institutions: University of Maryland, College Park

Julie Greene (born 1956) is an American historian, specializing in transnational history, global labor history, and American immigration history, who wrote the books Pure and Simple Politics (1998) and The Canal Builders (2009), the latter for which she was awarded a James A. Rawley Prize in 2010. She has been a professor of history at the University of Maryland, College Park since 2010, and the editor-in-chief of the academic journal Labor: Studies in Working-Class History since 2023.

== Education ==
Greene received a bachelor's degree in history from the University of Michigan in 1980, a master's degree in history from Cambridge's Murray Edwards College in 1987, and a Ph.D. in history from Yale University in 1990, where she studied under David Montgomery.

== Career ==
Following her doctoral studies, Greene held a brief appointment at the University of North Carolina at Chapel Hill before joining the University of Missouri–Kansas City in 1990 and then moving to the University of Colorado Boulder in 1994 as an assistant professor before being promoted to associate professor in 1999. In 1998, she published her first book titled Pure and Simple Politics: The American Federation of Labor and Political Activism 1881-1917, which was a study of the political evolution of the American Federation of Labor.

In 2008, Greene left the University of Colorado for the University of Maryland, where she was promoted to full professor of history in 2010. In 2009 Greene published her second book, The Canal Builders: Making America’s Empire at the Panama Canal, a transnational labor history of the building of the Panama Canal, which won the James A. Rawley Prize for the best book on the history of U.S. race relations in 2010.

In addition to her teaching and research, Greene has held a variety of leadership positions in academic organizations. In 2011, she and Ira Berlin co-founded and directed the University of Maryland's Center for Global Migration. Greene served in this position until 2022. Greene also served as the president of the Society for Historians of the Gilded Age and Progressive Era (SHGAPE) from 2013 to 2015, and then the Labor and Working-Class History Association (LAWCHA) from 2018 to 2020, having previously helped found the organization in 1997.

Greene has served as a series editor for the University of Illinois Press' The Working Class in American History book series since 2012. She was the founding reviews editor of Labor: Studies in Working-Class History, and served as an associate editor for the journal until 2023, when she became the editor-in-chief following Leon Fink's retirement.

== Selected works ==
=== Books ===
- — (1998). Pure and simple politics: the American federation of labor and political activism, 1881 - 1917. Cambridge University Press. ISBN 978-0521433983.
- — (2009). The Canal Builders : Making America's Empire at the Panama Canal. New York: Penguin Press. ISBN 978-0143116783.
- — (2025). Box 25: Archival Secrets, Caribbean Workers, and the Panama Canal. Chapel Hill: University of North Carolina Press. ISBN 9781469679488.

=== Selected articles and book chapters ===
- — (2021). "Rethinking the Boundaries of Class: Labor History and Theories of Class and Capitalism". Labor. 18 (2): 92–112. doi:10.1215/15476715-8849628.
- — (2020). Hoganson, Kristin L.; Sexton, Jay (eds.). "Entangled in Empires: British Antillean Migrations Amidst the World of the Panama Canal". Crossing Empires: Taking U.S. History into Transimperial Terrain. American encounters, global interactions. Durham: Duke University Press. ISBN 978-1-4780-0603-9.
- — (2020). "Bookends to a Gentler Capitalism: Complicating the Notion of First and Second Gilded Ages". The Journal of the Gilded Age and Progressive Era. 19 (2): 197–205. doi:10.1017/S1537781419000628.
- — (2017). "Race, Immigration, and Ethnicity". In Nichols, Christopher McKnight; Unger, Nancy C. (eds.). A Companion to the Gilded Age and Progressive Era. Wiley Blackwell Companions to American History. Chichester: Wiley Blackwell. ISBN 978-1-118-91396-3.
- — (2016). "Movable Empire: Labor, Migration, and U.s. Global Power During the Gilded Age and Progressive Era". The Journal of the Gilded Age and Progressive Era. 15 (1): 4–20. doi:10.1017/S1537781415000572. JSTOR 43903147.
- — (2015). "The Wages of Empire: Capitalism, Expansionism, and Working-Class Formation". In Bender, Daniel E.; Lipman, Jana K. (eds.). Making the empire work: labor and United States imperialism. Culture, labor, history series. New York: New York University Press. ISBN 978-1-4798-7125-4.
