= Joshua B. Freeman =

American historian

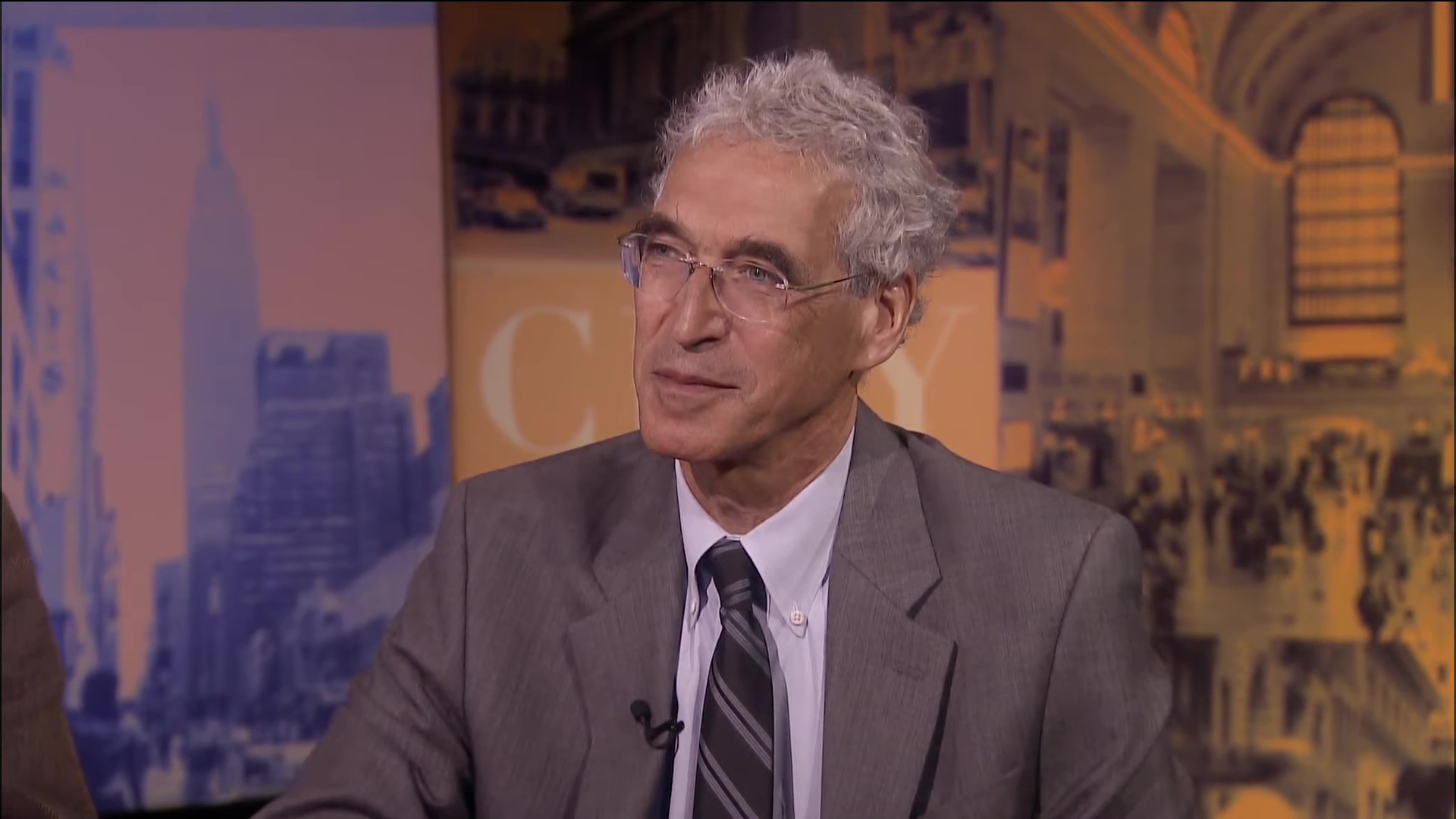
Freeman on CUNY TV's City Talk, 2013

Joshua B. Freeman (born 1949) is an author and professor of history at Queens College, City University of New York (CUNY) and the CUNY Graduate Center. He is the former executive officer of the Graduate Center's history department.

== Childhood and education ==
Freeman was born in 1949 in New York City to working class parents. His grandfather was very active in the American labor movement, and politically active. The influence of his parents and grandparents left him deeply aware of what it meant to be working class. As a youth, he often explored working-class neighborhoods and felt a deep affinity for other similarly situated people.

Freeman obtained a bachelor's degree from Harvard University in 1970.

He obtained a master's degree in 1976 and a Ph.D. in 1983, both from Rutgers University.

== Teaching career ==
In 1981, Freeman became an instructor at State University of New York at Old Westbury. He became an assistant professor of history before leaving in 1985.

In 1984, Freeman obtained a position as a senior research scholar at the CUNY Graduate Center, where he worked at the American Social History Project as a writer on the second volume of the project's two-volume textbook, Who Built America: Working People and the Nation's Economy, Politics, Culture and Society.

In 1987, Freeman left CUNY and was appointed an assistant professor at Columbia University. He became an associate professor in 1991.

In 1998, Freeman returned to CUNY, becoming an associate professor at Queens College and the CUNY Graduate Center. He was named a full professor in 2001.

== Research and writing ==
Freeman's research focuses on labor history and the sociology of working-class people. He writes from a "new labor history" theoretical perspective.

Two of Freeman's books have drawn notice from the academic community.

Freeman's 1988 book, In Transit: The Transport Workers Union in New York City, 1933-1966, won the Philip Taft Labor History Book Award in 1989. The book was widely reviewed and praised for unearthing the history of a radical union important in the history of the American labor movement.

In Transit is a richly detailed and analytically sophisticated book about a remarkable organization, the Transport Workers Union (TWU), in New York City in the heyday of industrial unionism in the 1930s and 1940s. The overall story of the TWU's development is closely intertwined with New York and New Deal politics, the emergence of the Congress of Industrial Organizations (CIO) and its bitter internecine quarrel with the American Federation of Labor, and the impact of the Second World War and the early Cold War on American society. But the most important -- and most fascinating -- of the book's many threads concerns the relationship between the TWU's Communist leadership and the union's Irish Catholic, and predominantly conservative, membership. Joshua Freeman engagingly demonstrates how this unlikely bond developed in the 1930s, and how it finally came unraveled in the dramatically altered political climate of the late 1940s.

Freeman's 2000 book, Working-Class New York: Life and Labor Since World War II, also won positive reviews. Freeman intended that the book correct histories of New York City which focused on wealthy elites, elected leaders and organizations. Throughout the first half of the book, Freeman argues that everyday workers were at least as influential as these other groups in making New York City into a progressive bastion and world economic and cultural center. Freeman

argues that the strength of organized labor and its continued political influence in the three decades following World War II were largely responsible for the rise of a social democratic politics that made the city special. The presence of organized labor, Freeman says, even gave the city its "cultural greatness." ... While little that is dramatically new is revealed here, Freeman's account is an important reminder that social policy is not made simply by political elites.

One critic argued that Freeman too easily dismissed conservative and anti-communist forces active in New York City at the time, wasting a chance to explain why leftist labor unions were able to overcome them and implement much of their agenda.

In 2012, Freeman released American Empire, 1945-2000: The Rise of a Global Power, The Democratic Revolution at Home. It is part of the Penguin History of the United States, edited by Eric Foner. In 2018, Freeman released Behemoth: A History of the Factory and the Making of the Modern World. In 2019, Freeman released City of Workers, City of Struggle: How Labor Movements Changed New York.

== Memberships and awards ==
Freeman is popular commentator on labor history on radio and television. He appeared in Ric Burns' New York: A Documentary Film. From 2001 to 2004, he wrote the "Our Living Tradition" column for the TWU Local 100 Express.

He is also an editor for New Labor Forum and the journal International Labor and Working-Class History.

His book In Transit was one of two co-winners of the Philip Taft Labor History Book Award in 1989, for the best book relating to the history of United States labor.

In 2000, his book Working-Class New York won the New York City Book Award, sponsored by the New York Society Library, for the best work of historical importance that evoked the spirit or enhanced appreciation of New York City.

== Published works ==
=== Solely authored books ===
- In Transit: The Transport Workers Union in New York City, 1933-1966. New ed., with new epilogue. Philadelphia: Temple University Press, 2001. ISBN 1-56639-922-X
- Working-Class New York: Life and Labor Since World War II. New York: The New Press, 2000. ISBN 1-56584-575-7
- American Empire, 1945-2000: The Rise of a Global Power, The Democratic Revolution at Home. New York: Viking, 2012. ISBN 978-0-670-02378-3
- Behemoth: A History of the Factory and the Making of the Modern World. New York: W. W. Norton & Company, 2018. ISBN 978-0-393-24631-5
- City of Workers, City of Struggle: How Labor Movements Changed New York. New York: Columbia University Press, 2019. ISBN 978-0-231-19192-0
- Garden Apartments: The History of a Low-Rent Utopia. The University of Chicago Press, 2026. ISBN 978-0-226-84181-6

=== Co-authored books ===
- Lichtenstein, Nelson, et al. Who Built America? Vol. 2: From 1877 to Present. 1st ed. New York: Pantheon Books, 1992. ISBN 1-57259-303-2

=== Co-edited books ===
- Fraser, Steven and Freeman, Joshua B., eds. Audacious Democracy: Labor, Intellectuals, and the Social Renewal of America. New York: Houghton Mifflin, 1997. ISBN 0-395-86682-0

=== Solely authored book chapters ===
- "Catholics, Communists, and Republicans: Irish Workers and the Organization of the Transport Workers Union." In Working-Class America: Essays on Labor, Community, and American Society. Daniel Walkowitz and Michael Frisch, eds. Champaign, Ill.: University of Illinois Press, 1983. ISBN 0-252-00953-3
- "Labor During the American Century: Work, Workers, and Unions Since 1945." In A Companion to Post-1945 America. Roy Rosenzweig and Jean-Christophe Agnew, eds. Boston, Mass.: Blackwell Publishing, 2002. ISBN 0-631-22325-8

=== Solely authored articles ===
- "Putting Conservatism Back into the 1960s." Radical History Review. Spring 1989.
- "Hardhats: Construction Workers, Manliness, and the 1970 Pro-War Demonstrations." Journal of Social History. June 1993.
- "Structure and Culture in the Labor Market." Labor History. Winter 1994.
- "The Strike Weapon: Can it Still Work?" Dissent. Spring 1997.
- "Red New York." Monthly Review. July/August 2002.
- "The Thirteenth Amendment is No Magic Bullet: Joshua B. Freeman Replies to Mark Dudzic." New Labor Forum. Spring 2005.
- "A Fight for the Future." The Nation. December 22, 2005.
- "Anatomy of a Strike: New York City Transit Workers Confront the Power Elite." New Labor Forum. Fall 2006.

=== Co-authored articles ===
- Freeman, Joshua B. and Rosswurm, Steven. "The Education of an Anti-Communist: Father John F. Cronin and the Baltimore Labor Movement." Labor History. Summer 1992.
