= Robert Zieger =

American historian (1938–2013)

Dr. Robert Zieger
- Born: August 2, 1938; Englewood, New Jersey, U.S.
- Died: March 6, 2013 (aged 74)
- Education: University of Maryland
- Scientific career
- Fields: Labor Historian
- Workplaces: University of Florida

Robert H. "Bob" Zieger (August 2, 1938 – March 6, 2013) was a labor historian whose research focused on the labor history of the United States.

== Biography ==
=== Early years ===
Robert H. Zieger was born August 2, 1938, in Englewood, New Jersey to John and Grace (Harman) Zieger. He married Gay Pitman in 1962. They had one child, Robert, and a granddaughter Persephone Zieger.

Zieger received his bachelor's degree from Montclair State College in 1960, a master's degree from the University of Wyoming in 1961, and his doctorate in history from the University of Maryland in 1965.

=== Career ===
Zieger obtained an appointment as an assistant professor of history at the University of Wisconsin–Stevens Point in 1964, rising to associate professor by 1973. He was an associate professor of history at Kansas State University from 1973 to 1977, and a professor of history at Wayne State University from 1977 to 1986.

In 1986, Zieger was appointed professor of history at the University of Florida. He was named Distinguished Professor of History in 1998.

=== Awards and memberships ===
Zieger's books have twice won the Philip Taft Labor History Book Award for the best book in labor history.

In 1985, Zieger's Rebuilding the Pulp and Paper Workers' Union, 1933–1941 was a Taft Prize co-winner with Paul Avrich's The Haymarket Tragedy.ISBN 978-0-691-00600-0

Zieger won the Taft Prize again in 1995 for his 1994 book, The CIO, 1935–1955.

Zieger was a member of the Organization of American Historians and the Southern Historical Association. He was also a member of the Historians of American Communism, and served as the organization's president from 1989 to 1992.

=== Children ===
Zieger had one child, who he named after himself. A Michigan native, Robert attended the University of Michigan in Ann Arbor, and after a foray into social work, received his M.A.T. from Duke University. In the course of his career, he has taught a range of social studies courses in the United States, Pakistan, Myanmar, Indonesia, the D.R. Congo, and Bolivia. Robert Zieger currently teaches Social Studies and Psychology at Dunecrest American School, Dubai.

== Works ==
- Robin Hood in the Silk City: The I.W.W. and the Paterson Silk Strike of 1913. Newark, N.J.: New Jersey Historical Society, 1966.
- Republicans and Labor, 1919–1929. Lexington, Ky.: University of Kentucky Press, 1969. online
- Madison's Battery Workers, 1934–1952: A History of Federal Labor Union 19587. Ithaca, N.Y.: ILR Press, 1977. online
- Rebuilding the Pulp and Paper Workers' Union, 1933–1941. Knoxville, Tenn.: University of Tennessee Press, 1985. online
- John L. Lewis: Labor Leader. New York: Twayne Publishers, 1988. online
- Organized Labor in the Twentieth-Century South. Knoxville, Tenn.: University of Tennessee Press, 1991. online
- Labor on the March. With Edward Levinson. Ithaca, N.Y.: ILR Press, 1995
- Southern Labor in Transition, 1940–1995. Robert H. Zieger, ed. Knoxville, Tenn.: University of Tennessee Press, 1997.
- The CIO, 1935–1955 (Chapel Hill, NC: University of North Carolina Press, 1997) online
- America's Great War: World War 1 and the American Experience. Lanham, Md.: Rowman and Littlefield Publishers, 2000. online
- American Workers, American Unions: The Twentieth Century. With Gilbert J. Gail. Baltimore: Johns Hopkins University Press, 3rd edition 2002. online
- For Jobs and Freedom: Race and Labor in America since 1865. Lexington, KY: University of Kentucky Press, 2007.

== Footnotes ==
- Who's Who in America. 59th ed. New Providence, N.J.: Marquis Who's Who, 2005.
