= Thavolia Glymph =

American historian and professor

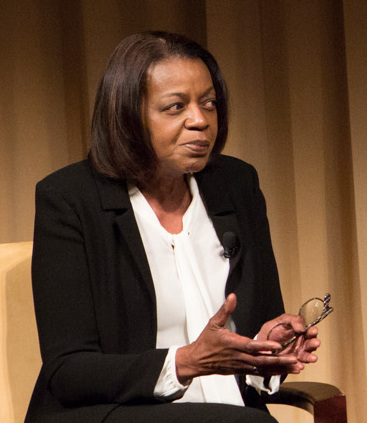
- Education: Hampton University; Purdue University
- Occupations: Historian, professor
- Employer: Duke University
- Notable work: Out of the House of Bondage
- Title: Professor of History and African-American Studies

Thavolia Glymph is an American historian and professor. She is Professor of History and African-American Studies at Duke University. She specializes in nineteenth-century US history, African-American history and women’s history, authoring Out of the House of Bondage: The Transformation of the Plantation Household (2008) and The Women's Fight: The Civil War's Battles for Home, Freedom, and Nation (2020). Elected the 140th president of the American Historical Association, she is the first Black woman to serve in that office.

== Education ==
Glymph earned her Ph.D. in economic history from Purdue University in 1994. As an undergrad at Hampton University, professor Alice Davis sparked her interest in historical research. A fluent French speaker, Glymph had originally intended to major in European history or French, but an article by Purdue historian Harold Woodman on the economics of African-American slavery caused her to pursue graduate work with Woodman.

== Career ==
Glymph's 2008 book, Out of the House of Bondage: The Transformation of the Plantation Household, won the Philip Taft Labor History Book Award and was finalist for the Jefferson Davis Award for outstanding narrative work on the period of the Confederacy and the Frederick Douglass Book Prize for the best book written in English on slavery or abolition. Susan-Mary Grant recommended Out of the House of Bondage as the book in the field of nineteenth-century American history that everyone should read.

In 2014, Glymph won the George and Ann Richards Prize for best article published in The Journal of the Civil War Era in 2013; her article, "Rose's War and the Gendered Politics of Slave Insurgency in the Civil War" described Rose's role as one of the leaders of a slave revolt.

Her 2020 book The Women's Fight: The Civil War's Battles for Home, Freedom, and Nation won the Darlene Clark Hine Award from the Organization of American Historians and the Albert J. Beveridge Award from the American Historical Association.

Glymph was elected president of the American Historical Association for the term beginning in 2024. The 140th president, she is the first Black woman to hold that post. In the same year she was elected to the American Academy of Arts and Sciences.

== Bibliography ==
- co-ed. Freedom: A Documentary History of Emancipation, 1861-1867, ser. 1, vol. 1, The Destruction of Slavery. (Cambridge University Press, 1985)
- co-ed. Essays on the Postbellum Southern Economy (TAMU Press, 1985)
- co-ed. Freedom: A Documentary History of Emancipation, 1861-1867, ser. 1, vol. 3, The Wartime Genesis of Free Labor: The Lower South. (Cambridge University Press, 1990)
- Out of the House of Bondage: The Transformation of the Plantation Household (Cambridge University Press, 2008)
- The Women's Fight: The Civil War's Battles for Home, Freedom, and Nation (University of North Carolina Press, 2020)
- African American Women and Children Refugees: A History of War and the Making of Freedom (forthcoming)
