= Sanford M. Jacoby =

American economist

Sanford M. Jacoby (born 1953) is an American economic historian and labor economist, and Distinguished Research Professor of Management, History, and Public Policy at University of California, Los Angeles. He is known for his studies of the transformation of work in American industry, corporate governance, Japanese management, and welfare capitalism.

== Biography ==
Born and raised in Washington Heights in New York City, Jacoby received his AB in Economics, magna cum laude, in 1974 from the University of Pennsylvania and his PhD in economics in 1981 from University of California, Berkeley.

Jacoby began his academic career at the UCLA Anderson School of Management in 1980 and was appointed Howard Noble Distinguished Professor in 2001. He was a founding faculty member of UCLA's Luskin School of Public Affairs and holds a position in UCLA's Department of History. Jacoby has been a visiting professor at the Doshisha University, London School of Economics, Cardiff University, University of Manchester, University of Tokyo, and Waseda University. His research interests include the history of employers, unions, and labor market institutions, and the political economy of corporate governance. He is co-editor of the Comparative Labor Law and Policy Journal.

Jacoby has received a series of recognitions for his work, starting in 1982 with the Allan Nevins Prize from the Economic History Association. In 1986 he received the George R. Terry Book Award of the Academy of Management, and in 1997 the Philip Taft Prize in Labor History. He is a fellow of the National Academy of Social Insurance, an Abe Fellow of the Japan Foundation and Social Science Research Council, and a Research Fellow of the Labor & Employment Relations Association. He is the recipient of fellowships from the National Endowment for the Humanities and from the John Simon Guggenheim Foundation.

== Selected publications ==
- Employing Bureaucracy: Managers, Unions, and the Transformation of Work in American Industry, 1900-1945. New York: Columbia University Press, 1985; revised edition 2004. Japanese translation.
- Modern Manors: Welfare Capitalism since the New Deal. Princeton University Press, 1997. Japanese translation.
- The Embedded Corporation: Corporate Governance and Employment Relations in Japan and the United States. Princeton University Press, 2005. Chinese and Japanese translations.
- Labor in the Age of Finance: Pensions, Politics, and Corporations from Deindustrialization to Dodd-Frank. Princeton University Press, 2021.
