= Shelton Stromquist =

American historian

Shelton Stromquist (born 1943) is an emeritus professor of history at the University of Iowa and a former president of the Labor and Working-Class History Association. A social and labor historian, Stromquist's research examines an array of topics that include nineteenth century labor movements in the United States, labor union politics during the Cold War, and workers' struggles for municipal socialism across the world.

== Education ==
Stromquist graduated from Yale University with a history major in 1966 and earned a PhD at the University of Pittsburgh in 1981, writing a dissertation under the supervision of David Montgomery.

== Personal life ==
Stromquist was an active participant in the United States civil rights movement. Having first enrolled as an undergraduate at Yale University, Stromquist dropped out in 1963, traveling to India with the Experiment in International Living and studying and working in Germany from 1963 to 1964. He returned to work with the Student Non-violent Coordinating Committee as a volunteer, helping to organize the Mississippi Freedom Democratic Party and register African Americans to vote in Vicksburg, Mississippi during Freedom Summer in 1964. He returned to Vicksburg during the summer of 1965 to continue that work and after graduating in 1966, joined the "Meredith March" in Mississippi from near Greenwood to the outskirts of Jackson. From 1966 to 1968 he served as a volunteer in Tanzania, East Africa with the American Friends Service Committee, working in Ujamaa (African socialist) villages. He married Ann Mullin, another AFSC volunteer, in Tanzania. They have three children, Christopher (1973), Matthew (1975) and Elizabeth (1979) (deceased). Stromquist was also active in the antiwar movement in Milwaukee, Wisconsin, from 1968 to 1971, first as a staff person with AFSC and then as a community organizer and volunteer with Casa Maria and the Catholic Worker movement.

== Bibliography ==
=== Solely authored books ===
- Stromquist, Shelton (1987). A Generation of Boomers: The Pattern of Railroad Labor Conflict in Nineteenth-Century America. Urbana: University of Illinois Press. ISBN 0252013026.
- Stromquist, Shelton (1993). Solidarity and Survival: An Oral History of Iowa Labor in the Twentieth Century. Iowa City: University of Iowa Press. ISBN 0877454310.
- Stromquist, Shelton (2006). Reinventing "The People": The Progressive Movement, the Class Problem, and the Origins of Modern Liberalism. Urbana: University of Illinois Press. ISBN 9780252072697.
- Stromquist, Shelton (2008). Labor's Cold War: Local Politics in a Global Context. Urbana: University of Illinois Press. ISBN 9780252074691.
- Stromquist, Shelton (2023). Claiming the City: A Global History of Workers' Fight for Municipal Socialism. New York: Verso Books. ISBN 9781839767777.

=== Edited volumes ===
- with Jeffrey Cox, Contesting the Master Narrative: Essays in Social History (Iowa City: University of Iowa Press, 1998).
- with James R. Barrett, A David Montgomery Reader: Essays on Capitalism and Worker Resistance (Urbana: University of Illinois Press; The Working Class in American History, 2024)
