= Daniel Leab =

American historian (1936–2016)

Daniel J. Leab
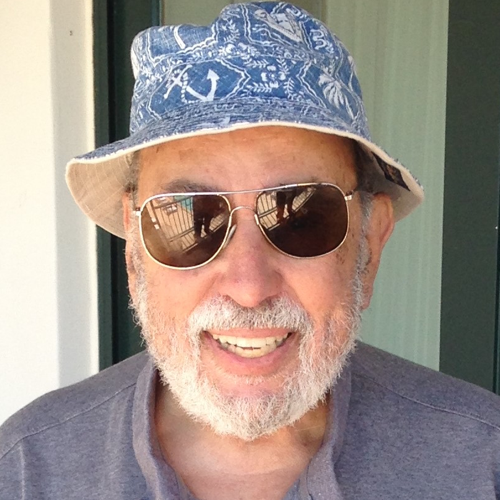
- Born: Daniel Joseph Liebeskind; 29 August 1936; Berlin, Germany
- Died: 15 November 2016 (aged 80); Washington, Connecticut, US
- Education: Columbia University
- Occupations: Professor of history, publisher, author
- Spouse: Katharine Kyes Leab
- Children: 3
- Relatives: Roger M. Kyes (father-in-law)

Daniel Joseph Leab (29 August 1936 – 15 November 2016) was an American historian of 20th-century history. He made significant academic contributions to fields of American labor unions and anti-Communism. He was long-time editor of three journals and magazines.

== Background ==
Leab was born Daniel Joseph Liebeskind on 29 August 1936 in Berlin, German. His mother was Herta Marcus (1901–1981) from the East Prussian town of Gilgenburg (now Dąbrówno, Poland). His father was Leo Liebeskind (1897–1979) of Berlin. Although they had planned to leave Germany for Palestine, instead they emigrated to America in 1943, where they changed the surname from Liebeskind to Leab.

In 1957, Leab obtained a BA from Columbia University. From 1957 to 1958, he attended Harvard Law School. Returning to Columbia, he obtained an MA in 1961 and PhD in 1969. He wrote his doctoral dissertation on the formative years of the American Newspaper Guild (1933-1936).

== Career ==
=== Academics ===
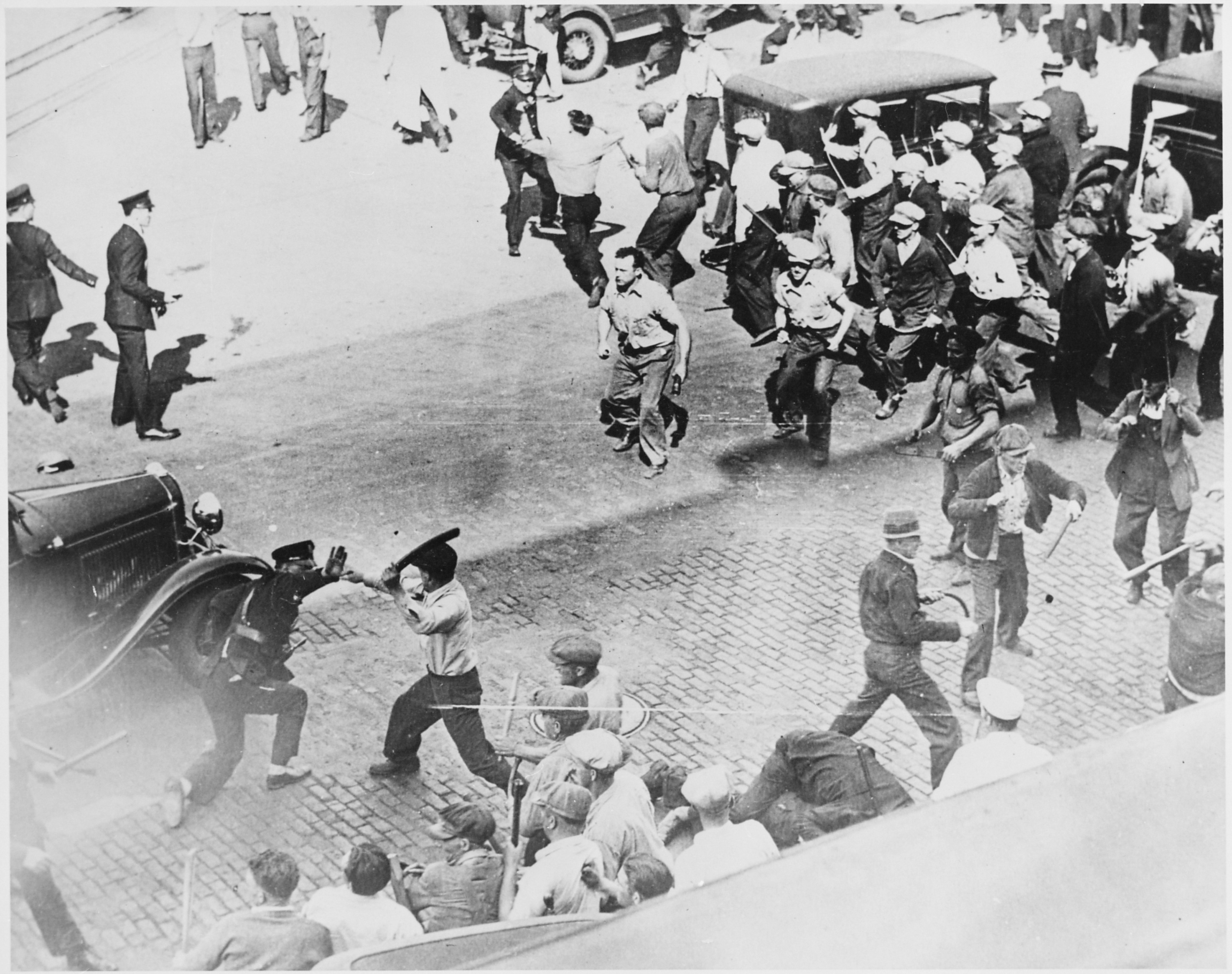
Teamsters clash with armed police during a Minneapolis 1934 strike.

In 1966, Leab began teaching at universities. He first taught in the history department of his alma mater, Columbia University. Eventually, he served there as associate dean of Columbia College, a member of the university's central administration, and member of the executive committee of the university's senate.

In 1974, he began teaching at Seton Hall University. He began as an associate professor. By 1980, he had become a full professor. He taught 20th-century history for more than three decades there.

Provost John Duff appointed him to oversee the university's American Studies Program. He served as acting chairman of the Department of History and two years as chair of University Rank and Tenure Committee. He created and directed its Multi-Cultural Program.

He wrote or edited seven books, published more than 90 articles, and lectured extensively in Europe and America.

Research topics included labor history, history in film, and cultural conflicts of the Cold War.

He was a senior Fulbright lecturer at the University of Cologne two times (1977 spring, 1986–1987) and in 2008 he was a visiting professor of history there. He was also visiting professor at the University of Pennsylvania (1986 spring) and at the Heim-Hoch-Volksschule, in Falkenstein, Bavaria, Germany (June 1970, July 1972, July 1975).

=== Editing and publishing ===
In the 1960s, Leab served as an editorial assistant of and contributing editor to the Columbia Journalism Review.

In 1974, Leab became managing editor of peer-reviewed Labor History journal and served for more than two decades, as well as editor of the Historical Journal of Film, Radio, and Television published by the International Association for Media and History (IAMHIST).

He was also publisher of American Books Prices Current, edited by his wife.

In 1982, he was primary founder and long-time managing editor of American Communist History, peer-reviewed journal of the academic group Historians of American Communism (HOAC). He also served as HOAC secretary and treasurer, along with John Earl Haynes.

=== Administration ===
Leab helped administer both Seton Hall and Columbia universities:

- Seton Hall University:
  - 2005–2006: Member of Faculty Committee on Criminal Justice and Faculty Rights
  - 1996–1997: Chair of Program Review for Department of History
  - 1990–1995: Creator and Initiator of Multi-Cultural Diversity Program
  - 1990–1991: Chair of University Rank and Tenure Committee
  - 1987–1989: Member of Educational Policy Committee
  - 1974–1979: Director of American Studies Program
- Columbia University:
  - 1973–1974: Special Assistant to Vice President and Provost
  - 1972–1974: Member of Executive Committee of University Senate
  - 1971–1972: Assistant Dean of Faculties of the University
  - 1969–1971: Associate Dean of Columbia College

== Personal and death ==
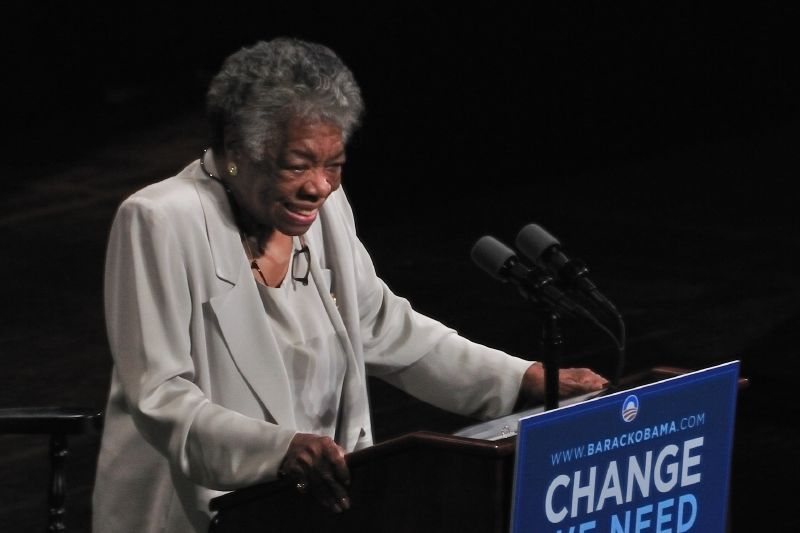
Leab admired Maya Angelou (here, speaking at a rally for then presidential candidate Barack Obama in 2008)

Leab married Katharine Kyes, the editor of American Book Prices Current (published by Bancroft-Parkman, Inc.), in 1964. They had three children: Abigail Leab Martin, Constance Rigney, and Marcus Leab.

Leab quoted aphorisms to describe views on history with which he disagreed:

- Voltaire: "A pack of lies mutually agreed upon"
- Henry Ford: "More or less bunk"
- Truman Capote" History teaches us... nothing"

Leab held that such aphorisms merely pointed out "failings of History as a discipline and as a guide." Instead, he expressed his views on history with a quote from poet Maya Angelou:

History, despite its wrenching pain
Cannot be unlived, but if faced
With courage, need not be lived again.

He served as justice of the peace for Washington, Connecticut, from 1999 until his death. He served on the Connecticut Region 12 Board of Education for Bridgewater-Roxbury-Washington (1997–2001, 2003–2004). He served as a board member for Blue Card (Holocaust Survivors Aid Organization) (1993–2000). He served on the board of trustees and secretary for the Clockwork Community Theatre of Oakville, Connecticut (2000–2001).

He died on 15 November 2016, at his home in Washington, Connecticut, surrounded by his family.

== Works ==
Colleague David Culbert praised Leab's book Orwell Subverted as "masterly."

=== Books ===
Leab's books include:

- A Union of Individuals: The Formation of the American Newspaper Guild, 1933-1936 (1970)
- From Sambo to Superspade: The Black Experience in Motion Pictures (1975)
- George Orwell : An Exhibition at the Grolier Club: Selections from the Collection of Daniel J. Leab (1996)
- I Was a Communist for the FBI: The Unhappy Life and Times of Matt Cvetic (2000) about FBI informant Matt Cvetic
- Orwell Subverted: The CIA and the Filming of Animal Farm (2007)

=== Books co-written ===
Leab co-wrote the following with his wife:

- The Auction Companion (1981)

=== Books edited ===
Leab edited or co-edited the following:

- American Working Class History: A Representative Bibliography (1983)
- The Labor History Reader (1985)
- Federal Bureau of Investigation Confidential Files: Communist Activity in the Entertainment Industry [microform] : FBI Surveillance Files on Hollywood, 1942-1958 (1991)
- Labor History Archives in the United States: A Guide for Researching and Teaching (1992)
- The Great Depression and the New Deal: A Thematic Encyclopedia (2010)
- Red activists and black freedom: James and Esther Jackson and the long civil rights revolution (2010)
- Encyclopedia of American Recessions and Depressions (2014)

=== Journals edited ===
Leab edited the following:

- American Communist History (published by Historians of American Communism, HOAC) (2001–2016)
- CLOSEUPS: The IAMHIST Bulletin quarterly (1999–2002): created, edited, contributed
- Film History (1996–2016)
- Historical Journal of Film, Radio & TV (1993–2016)
- Washington Rod and Gun Club Bulletin (1996–1998)
- Columbia Journalism Review (1960–1978):
  - Contributing editor (1972–1978)
  - Research associate (1964–1968)
  - Assistant editor (1962–1964)
  - Editorial assistant (1960–1962)
- Labor History (1974-1999)

=== Encyclopedic articles ===
Leab contributed the following:

- Encyclopedia of the American Left (1986): "Herbert Benjamin," "David Lasser"
- Encyclopedia of World Biography (1987, 1988 1990, 1995): "Orson Welles," "Spencer Tracy," "Vanessa Redgrave," "Bing Crosby," "Clint Eastwood"
- Dictionary of American Biography (Supplements): "Louis Boudin" (1977), "Jesse Lasky" (1980), "Joseph von Sternberg" (1988), "Siegfried Kracauer" (1988), "Louella Parons" (1994), "A.A. Berle, Jr." (1994), "Lowell Weicker, Sr." (1995)
- Scibner's Encyclopedia of American Lives: "Burr Tilstrom" (1998), "Gordon Ray" (1999), "Jose Ferrer" (2001), "Dorothy Buffum Chandler" (202), "Huntley Brinkley" (2003), "Sports Figures" (2003)
- American National Biography: "Heywood Broun" (1999), "Matt Cvetic" (1999), "Greta Garbo" (1999), "William Grant Still" (1999), "Louis Ludlow" (2004)

== Awards and recognition ==
Leab received the following awards and recognition.

- 2005: Award for best article by senior scholar in 2005 volume of Historical Journal of Film, Radio, and Television
- 1997: John Commerford Prize of the New York State Labor History Association
- 1991-1992: Grant for Implementation of Pilot Multi-Media Core Course from New Jersey Department of Higher Education (Co-Principal Investigator)
- 1989: Grant from Seton Hall University Research Council
- 1986: Fulbright Senior Lectureship to University of Cologne
- 1980: National Endowment for the Humanities Fellowship
- 1977: Fulbright Senior Lectureship to University of Cologne

== Legacy ==
=== American Book Prices Current Exhibition Catalogue Awards ===
In 1987, Leab and his wife established and endowed the annual "Katharine Kyes Leab & Daniel J. Leab American Book Prices Current Exhibition Catalogue Awards" for excellence in publishing of catalogs and brochures that accompany exhibitions of library and archival materials, plus accompanying digital exhibitions. The Exhibition Awards Committee of the ALA/ACRL Rare Books and Manuscripts Section (RBMS) administers the awards.

=== Book exhibitions ===
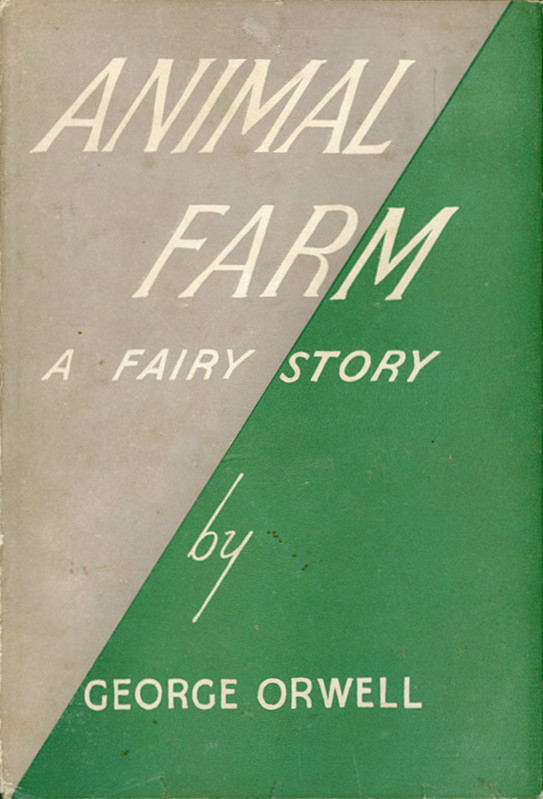
Animal Farm first edition cover.

Leab championed books in culture; an example was an exhibition of books by George Orwell held at Brown University in 1997, which featured books from Leab's personal collection. He gave the collection to Brown.

=== Papers and collections ===
In addition to donating his collection of films and his extensive working library of printed books, magazines, catalogs and other ephemera on American and European Film and Cinema to the Film Department of the Museum of Modern Art, NY, in 2011, Leab left several collections of papers and books:

- Papers of Daniel J. Leab at National Library of Australia (since 1970s): Academic essays, masters and doctoral theses; academic papers, drafts, critiques and addresses by authors involved in film industry; printed matter; German language material including proceedings of film conferences, essays on film classification and film production, 1965 bibliography of films and producers, and articles
- Daniel J. Leab Collection 1920-1977 at Center for Jewish History (since 1970s): Family scrapbooks and photo albums of parents Herta and Leo Leab plus travels of Leab, with annotations by Leab
- Daniel J. Leab Collection - Papers, 1900–1975 at Wayne State University - Walter P. Reuther Library (since 1980): Materials used to research his doctoral dissertation, published A Union of Individuals: The Formation of the American Newspaper Guild, 1933-1936 (1970) and for From Sambo to Superspade: The Black Experience in Motion Pictures (1975)
- Daniel J. Leab papers 1950-2006 at Brown University (since 2010): Materials by and about George Orwell, collected by Daniel J. Leab in writing Orwell Subverted: the CIA and the Filming of Animal Farm
- Daniel J. Leab collection at Seton Hall University (since 2015): Materials used for research on topics that include: the Cold War, American communism, the American labor movement, the history of the FBI and the CIA, and the history of film.

== See also ==
- Katharine Kyes Leab
- Labor unions in the United States
- The Newspaper Guild
- George Orwell
- Matt Cvetic
- Historians of American Communism (HOAC)
