= Nancy Woloch =

American historian (born 1940)

- Born: 1940 (age 85–86)
- Education: Wellesley College (BA), Columbia University (MA), Indiana University (PhD)
- Occupation: Historian
- Organization(s): Adjunct at Barnard College and Columbia University

Nancy Woloch (born 1940) is an American historian. Her book A Class by Herself: Protective Laws for Women Workers, 1890s–1990s won the 2016 Philip Taft Labor History Book Award and the William G. Bowen Award for the Outstanding Book on Labor and Public Policy.

Woloch is an adjunct professor at Barnard College and Columbia University, where she specializes in women's history and the history of education.

Woloch has a BA from Wellesley College, an MA from Columbia University and a PhD from Indiana University.

In 2016 Time chose Woloch as one of 25 historians asked to nominate a "Moment that changed America", and she contributed "FDR Signs the Fair Labor Standards Act (June 25, 1938)".

== Selected publications ==
- A Class by Herself: Protective Laws for Women Workers, 1890s-1990s (2015, Princeton UP, ISBN 9780691002590)
- Women and the American Experience (Knopf, 1984; 5th ed. McGraw Hill, 2011 ISBN 9780073385570)
- The American Century: A History of the United States Since the 1890s, with Walter La Feber and Richard Polenberg (7th ed., 2013, ISBN 9780765634832)
- Early American Women: A Documentary History, 1600-1900 (2nd edition, 1997, ISBN 9780070715332)
- Muller v. Oregon: A Brief History with Documents (1996, Bedford Books of St. Martin's Press, ISBN 9780312085865)
