= Cindy Hahamovitch =

American historian

- Born: Montreal, Quebec, Canada
- Spouse: Scott Reynolds Nelson (1985-present)
- Awards: Merle Curti Award

Academic background
- Education: Rollins College, University of North Carolina, Chapel Hill

Academic work
- Discipline: History
- Sub-discipline: Labor History
- Institutions: College of William & Mary, University of Georgia

Cindy Hahamovitch is an American historian, and the B. Phinizy Spalding Distinguished Professor of Southern History at the University of Georgia. She has won a Merle Curti Award, a Philip Taft Labor History Book Award and a James A. Rawley Prize (OAH).

== Life ==
She was born in Montreal, Quebec in 1962. She graduated from Rollins College in 1983 and in 1992 she received a PhD from the University of North Carolina, Chapel Hill, where she studied with Leon Fink. She taught at York University in Toronto for two years and at the College of William & Mary for 23. She joined the faculty at the University of Georgia in 2016 She is an Organization of American Historians Distinguished Lecturer and a member of the Society of American Historians.

== Works ==
- The Fruits of Their Labor: Atlantic Coast Farmworkers and the Making of Migrant Poverty, 1870-1945. Chapel Hill, NC: University of North Carolina Press, 1997. ISBN 9780807823309, OCLC 833101124
- No Man’s Land: Jamaican Guestworkers in America and the Global History of Deportable Labor. Princeton: Princeton University Press, 2011. ISBN 9780691102689, OCLC 779679229
