= Death in the Haymarket =

2006 history book by James Green

- Author: James Green
- Subject: American history
- Publisher: Pantheon Books
- Publication date: 2006
- Pages: 383
- ISBN: 0375422374
- OCLC: 61115603

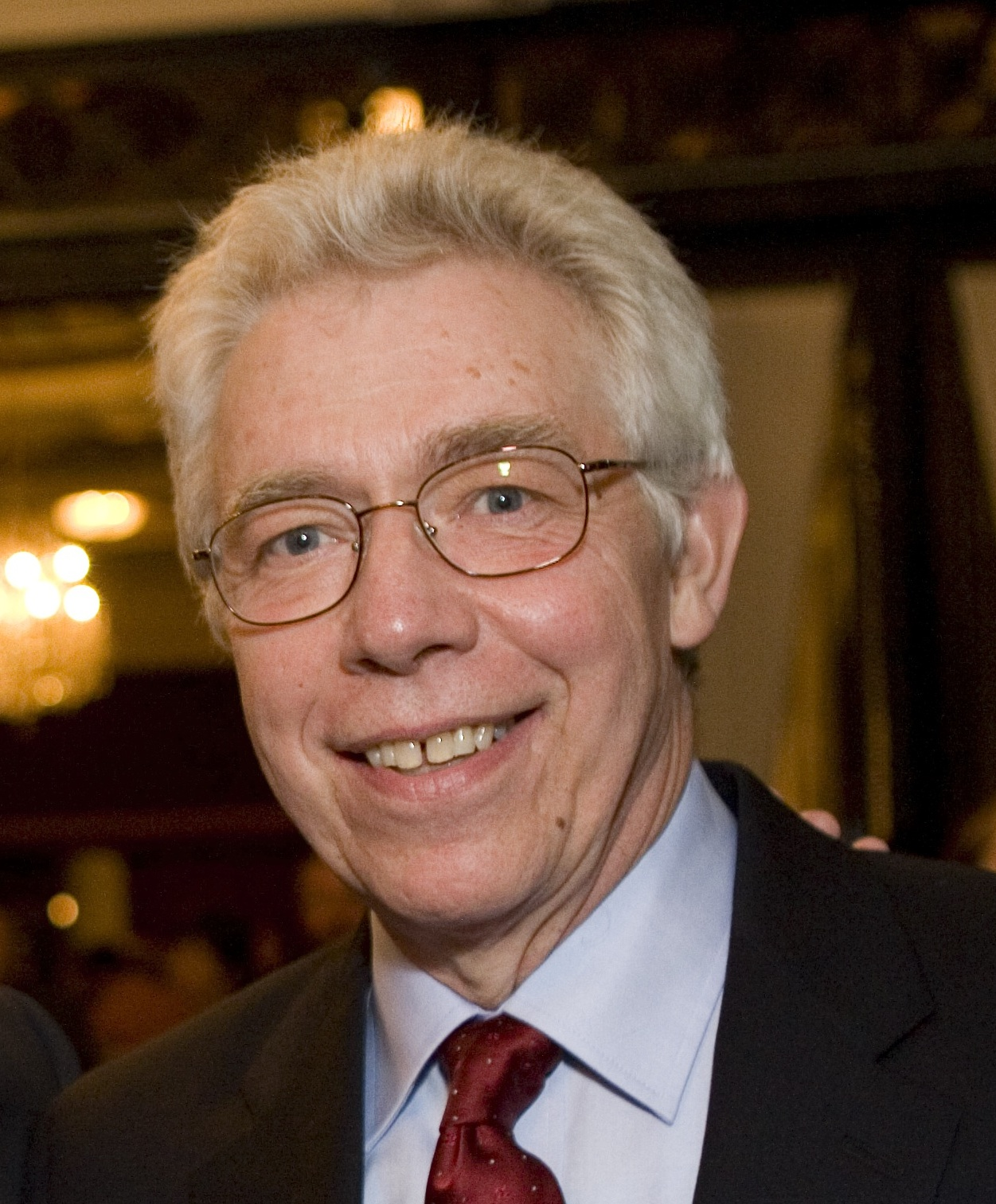
The author, 2009

External videos
- Green speaks about his book on C-SPAN, 2006

Death in the Haymarket is a 2006 popular history book on the Haymarket affair, written by James Green.

== Bibliography ==
- Adler, Jeffrey S. (2007). "Review of Death in the Haymarket: A Story of Chicago, the First Labor Movement and the Bombing That Divided Gilded Age America". Social History. 32 (3): 355–357. ISSN 0307-1022. JSTOR 4287471.
- Barrett, James R. (March 2007). "Death in the Haymarket: A Story of Chicago, the First Labor Movement, and the Bombing That Divided Gilded Age America". Labor. 4 (1): 119–121. doi:10.1215/15476715-2006-043. ISSN 1547-6715.
- Blocker, Jack S. (2007). "New Wine in Old Bottles". The Journal of the Gilded Age and Progressive Era. 6 (1): 99–104. doi:10.1017/S1537781400001626. ISSN 1537-7814. JSTOR 25144465. S2CID 203147413.
- Cochran, David (2007). "Review of Death in the Haymarket: A Story of Chicago, the First Labor Movement and the Bombing That Divided Gilded Age America". Journal of the Illinois State Historical Society. 100 (1): 67–69. ISSN 1522-1067. JSTOR 40204670.
- Crain, Caleb (March 5, 2006). "The Terror Last Time". The New Yorker. pp. 82–89.
- Creagh, Ronald (2007). "Review of Death in the Haymarket. A Story of Chicago, the First Labor Movement and the Bombing that Divided Gilded Age America". Vingtième Siècle. Revue d'histoire (96): 287–288. ISSN 0294-1759. JSTOR 20475227.
- Dabscheck, Braham (2007). "Review of Death in the Haymarket: A Story Of Chicago, the First Labor Movement and the Bombing that Divided Gilded Age America". Labour History (92): 164–166. doi:10.2307/27516200. ISSN 0023-6942. JSTOR 27516200.
- Dubofsky, Melvyn (2007). "Review of Death in the Haymarket: A Story of Chicago, the First Labor Movement, and the Bombing That Divided Gilded Age America". Industrial and Labor Relations Review. 60 (2): 301–302. doi:10.1177/001979390706000216. ISSN 0019-7939. JSTOR 25249084. S2CID 220642909.
- Fraser, Steve (March 16, 2006). "Crowds and Power". The Nation. pp. 34–38.
- Goldstein, Robert Justin (2007). "Review of Death in the Haymarket: A Story of Chicago, the First Labor Movement, and the Bombing That Divided Gilded Age America". The Journal of American History. 94 (1): 302–303. doi:10.2307/25094877. ISSN 0021-8723. JSTOR 25094877.
- Guttenplan, D. D. (2009). "A Judicious Dose of Hemp: the Long Shadow of the Haymarket Bombing". History Workshop Journal. 67 (67): 252–261. doi:10.1093/hwj/dbn031. ISSN 1363-3554. JSTOR 40646226.
- Jentz, John B. (2006). "Review of Death in the Haymarket: A Story of Chicago, the First Labor Movement, and the Bombing That Divided Gilded Age America". The Register of the Kentucky Historical Society. 104 (2): 335–336. ISSN 0023-0243. JSTOR 23386701.
- Kaster, Gregory L. (2006). "Review of Death in the Haymarket: A Story of Chicago, the First Labor Movement and the Bombing that Divided Gilded Age America". The History Teacher. 40 (1): 128–129. doi:10.2307/30036947. ISSN 0018-2745. JSTOR 30036947.
- Knight, Louise W. (May 7, 2006). "Red Scare". The New York Times. ISSN 0362-4331.
- Lause, Mark A. (2007). "Review of Death in the Haymarket: A Story of Chicago, the First Labor Movement, and the Bombing That Divided Gilded Age America". Labour / Le Travail. 60: 298–300. ISSN 0700-3862. JSTOR 25149830.
- Lichtenstein, Alex (April 16, 2006). "Death in the Haymarket by James Green". Houston Chronicle.
- Postel, Charles (2007). "Review of Death in the Haymarket: A Story of Chicago, the First Labor Movement, and the Bombing That Divided Gilded Age America". Michigan Historical Review. 33 (2): 175–176. doi:10.1353/mhr.2007.0040. ISSN 0890-1686. JSTOR 20174237. S2CID 258104794.
- Potruff, Benjamin (2007). "Review of Death in the Haymarket: A Story of Chicago, the First Labor Movement and the Bombing That Divided Gilded Age America". Journal of Social History. 41 (2): 466–468. doi:10.1353/jsh.2008.0028. ISSN 0022-4529. JSTOR 25096500. S2CID 142730631.
- Schneirov, Richard (2007). "Review of Death in the Haymarket: A Story of Chicago, The First Labor Movement and the Bombing that Divided Gilded Age America". The Historian. 69 (4): 778–779. doi:10.1111/j.1540-6563.2007.00197_18.x. ISSN 0018-2370. JSTOR 24453596. S2CID 144605357.
- Tartakowsky, Danielle (2010). "Review of Death in the Haymarket. A story of Chicago, the first labor movement and the bombing that divided gilded age America". Le Mouvement Social (230): 165–166. ISSN 0027-2671. JSTOR 40732089.
- Teaford, Jon C. (2006). "Good Read, Old Story". Reviews in American History. 34 (3): 350–354. doi:10.1353/rah.2006.0051. ISSN 0048-7511. JSTOR 30031536. S2CID 144084130.
