= Alice Kessler-Harris =

American historian (born 1941)

Alice Kessler-Harris (June 2, 1941, Leicester) is R. Gordon Hoxie Professor Emerita of American History at Columbia University, and former president of the Organization of American Historians, and specialist in the American labor and comparative and interdisciplinary exploration of women and gender.

== Education ==
Kessler-Harris received her B.A. from Goucher College in 1961 and her Ph.D. from Rutgers University in 1968.

== Career ==
She contributed the piece "Pink Collar Ghetto, Blue Collar Token" to the 2003 anthology Sisterhood Is Forever: The Women's Anthology for a New Millennium, edited by Robin Morgan.

Her newest book, A Difficult Woman: The Challenging Life and Times of Lillian Hellman, was published in June 2012. Her other books include Gendering Labor History, which collects some of her best-known essays on women and wage work; In Pursuit of Equity: Women, Men, and the Quest for Economic Citizenship in Twentieth Century America, which won several prizes including the Joan Kelly Prize, the Philip Taft award, and the Bancroft Prize. Among her other fellowships and awards, Kessler-Harris has been a fellow at the National Humanities Center in Durham, North Carolina and at the Radcliffe Institute for Advanced Study. In the Spring of 1997, Kessler-Harris was a Fellow at the Swedish Collegium for Advanced Study in Uppsala, Sweden. She is the past president of the Labor and Working-Class History Association.

== Selected works ==
=== Books ===
- Women Have Always Worked: A Historical Overview (1981)
- Out to Work: A History of Wage-Earning Women in the United States (1982)
- A Woman's Wage: Historical Meanings and Social Consequences (1990)
- In Pursuit of Equity: Women, Men and the Quest for Economic Citizenship in Twentieth Century America (2001)
- Gendering Labor History (2007)
- A Difficult woman: The Challenging Life and Times of Lillian Hellman (2012)

== See also ==
- Lillian Hellman
