= Maurice Isserman =

American historian (born 1951)

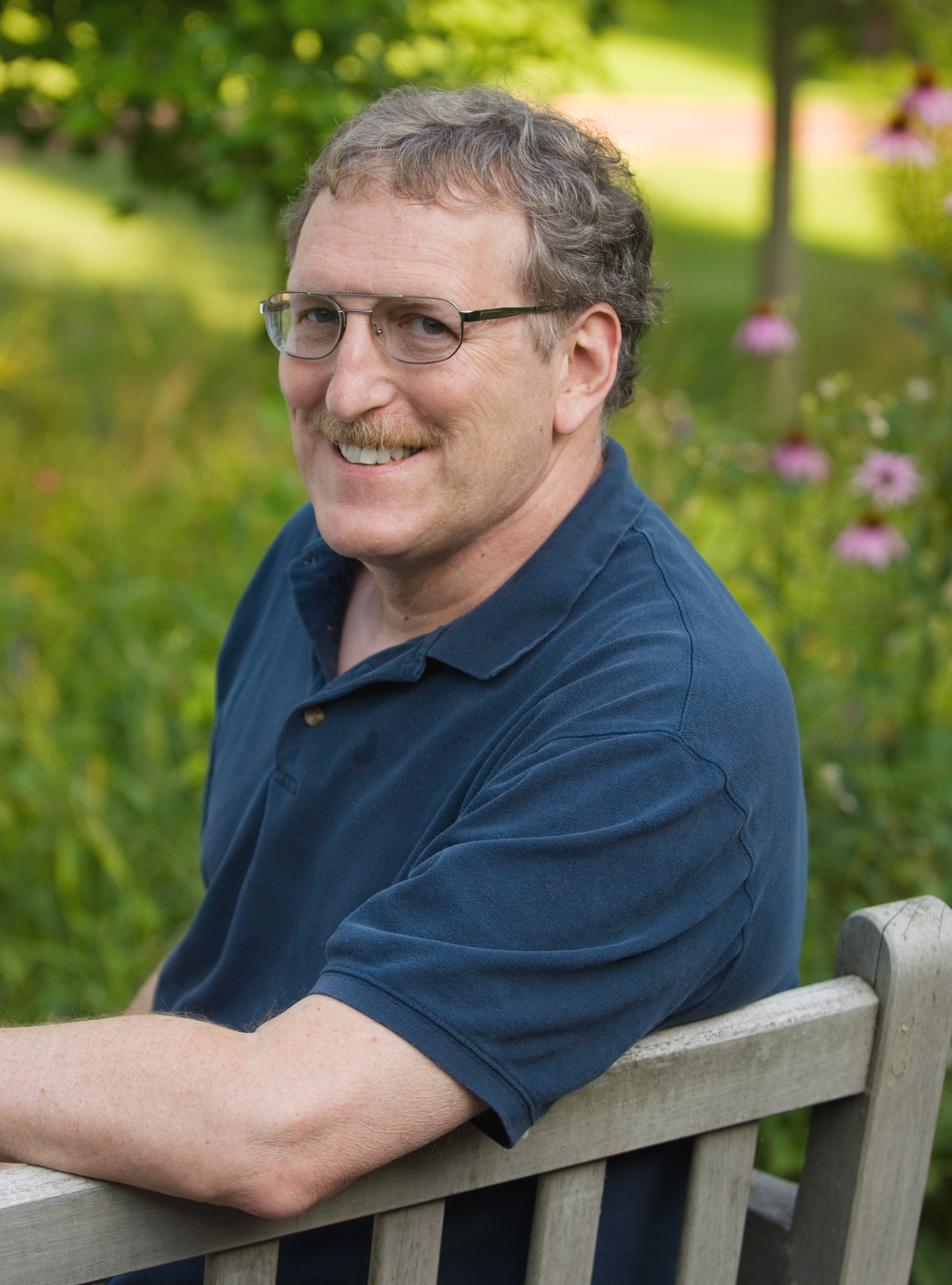
- Isserman in 2008
- Born: March 12, 1951 (age 75); Hartford, Connecticut, US

Academic background
- Education: Reed College; University of Rochester
- Doctoral advisor: Eugene Genovese

Academic work
- Discipline: History
- Institutions: Hamilton College
- Main interests: History of American communism; history of the New Left

Maurice Isserman (born 1951) is an American historian who is Professor of History at Hamilton College. He has written about the Communist Party USA during the Popular Front period of the 1930s and 1940s, as well as the emergence of the New Left and the 1960s. He co-authored a biography with Dorothy Ray Healey and authored a biography of Michael Harrington, both of whom were co-founders of Democratic Socialists of America. He has contributed editorials and book reviews to The New York Times, The Boston Globe, Newsday, the Los Angeles Times, The Nation, and The American Alpine Review. In 2008, he began writing about mountaineering.

== Early life ==
Isserman was born in Hartford, Connecticut, on March 12, 1951. His mother, Flora (née Huffman), was the daughter and sister of Quaker ministers, graduated from a Quaker college, and was a social worker in Connecticut. His father Jacob (Jack) Isserman, born in Antwerp, came with his family to the US at age four in 1906; he was a machinist who worked at the Pratt and Whitney aircraft factory in East Hartford, Connecticut.

The Issermans were Jewish; Maurice's uncle, Ferdinand Isserman, was a prominent rabbi in St. Louis, Missouri. Another uncle, lawyer Abraham J. Isserman, was member of the International Juridical Association (1931 and the American Civil Liberties Union, as well as a founding member of the National Lawyers Guild (1937). Abraham was a defense lawyer in the first Smith Act trial of Communist Party leaders in 1949 during which he was cited for contempt and then imprisoned afterwards and disbarred.

Isserman's parents had divorced in 1959, and his mother remarried Walter Snow, a local newspaper reporter who had been a Communist in the 1930s, a minor figure on the literary left (John Reed Club member, and the editor of The Anvil, a Midwestern radical literary magazine). They lived in the small town of Coventry, Connecticut. Maurice Isserman graduated from Coventry High School in 1968.

After his father's death in 1963, Maurice became close to his uncle Abraham, who took him to one of his first demonstrations, the 1967 March on the Pentagon.

== Education ==
In the fall of 1968, Isserman enrolled in Reed College in Portland, Oregon, where he joined the campus chapter of Students for a Democratic Society and took part in antiwar protests and other New Left activism. In the spring of 1970, following the US invasion of Cambodia and the Kent State University strike, he dropped out of Reed College and joined the Portland Revolutionary Youth Movement (PRYM) collective. PRYM members were involved in antiwar activities in a local underground newspaper, The Willamette Bridge, and in the local food co-op.

After a couple of years, PRYM disbanded, and Isserman returned to Reed to finish his undergraduate degree. He wrote a senior thesis on the history of radical American writers in the 1930s and worked on another underground newspaper, The Portland Scribe. He graduated with a BA in history in 1973 and stayed on another year, working evenings as a proofreader for The Oregonian and days (unpaid) for The Portland Scribe.

In August 1974, Isserman began graduate work in history at the University of Rochester, working closely with Eugene Genovese and Christopher Lasch. He received his MA in American history in 1976 and his PhD in 1979. His dissertation was a history of American communism during the Second World War, which became his first published book, Which Side Were You On? in 1982.

== Academic career ==
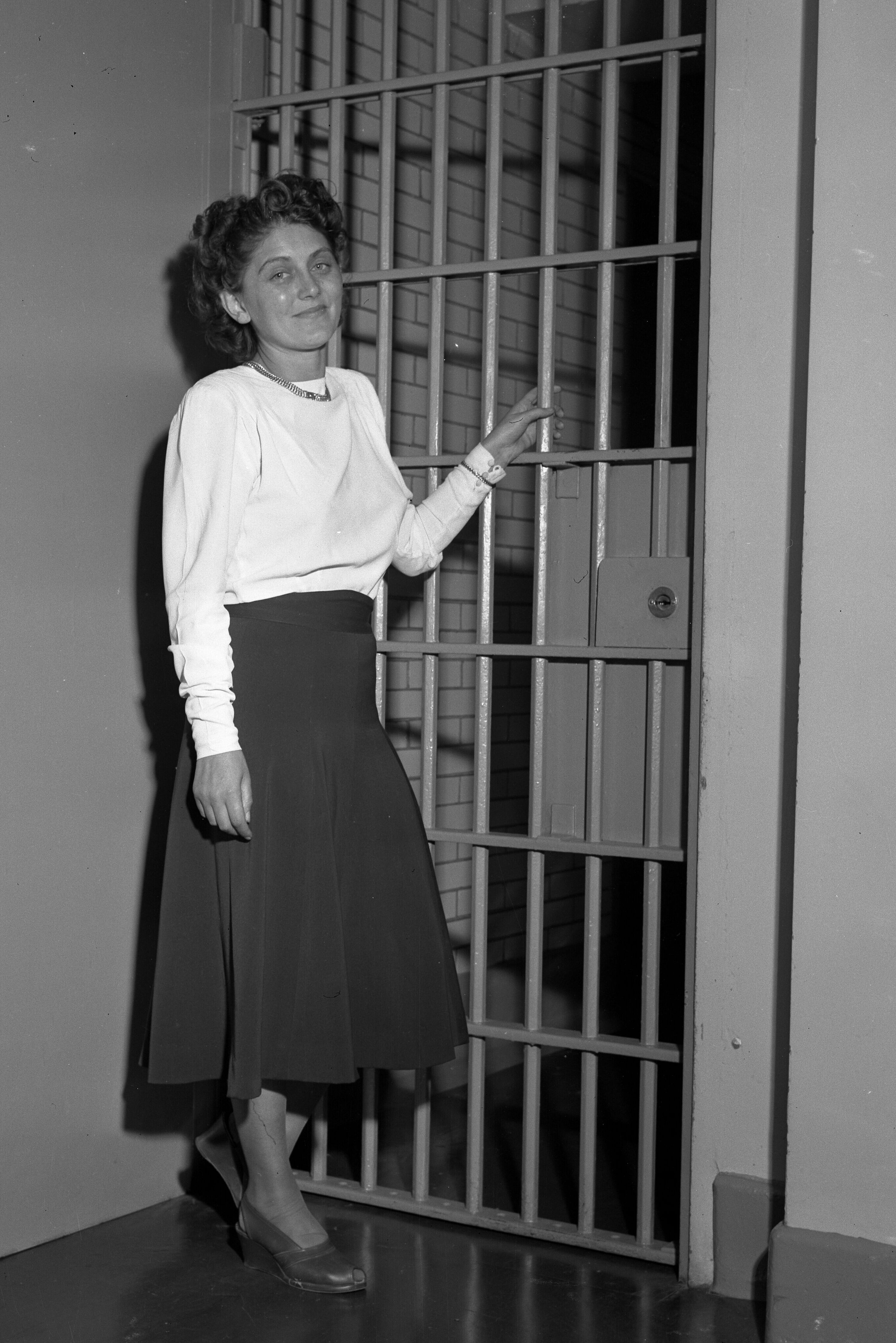
Dorothy Ray Healey (here, in a Los Angeles jail circa 1949), subject of co-written memoir with Isserman

Isserman's first job after completing his dissertation was a replacement position for a semester at Oberlin College in fall 1979, followed by replacement positions at Hobart and William Smith Colleges and then back to Oberlin. He settled into Smith College from 1982 to 1988, followed by temporary positions at Mount Holyoke College and Williams College.

During this period, a debate broke out over the character of American communism, and Isserman's book was one of several criticized by Theodore Draper's two-part attack on the "new history of American Communism" in The New York Review of Books. As the debate heated up, Isserman criticized books by Draper's protégé, Harvey Klehr. Isserman returned to the theme with a chapter on the history of the CPUSA's "destalinization crisis" in his second book on the emergence of the New Left, If I Had a Hammer in 1987, and in his co-authored work with Healey, Dorothy Healey Remembers, in 1990 (reissued in paperback as California Red).

Isserman secured a tenure-track position at Hamilton College in 1990 as the James L. Ferguson Professor of History. After the debate over American communism, Isserman shifted his focus to the history of conflicts between left and right during the 1960s in his book with Michael Kazin, America Divided: The Civil War of the 1960s, now in its third edition. He wrote a prize-winning biography of America's best known socialist of his time, Michael Harrington, leader of the Democratic Socialists of America.

In 1997, Isserman received a Fulbright grant to teach American Political History in Moscow State University in Russia.

Beginning in 2008, Isserman has written several books and articles about mountaineering in the Himalayas and in the United States. He has also written a history of Hamilton College for its bicentennial in 2012.

Isserman has participated in an exchange at the University of Sussex in fall 1985, a Mellon fellowship at Harvard University, 1992–1993, a Fulbright Distinguished Professorship at Moscow State University in 1997, and an exchange at Pembroke College, Oxford University in 2001.

== Political views ==
In 2007, Isserman criticized the newly re-formed Students for a Democratic Society for romanticizing the leadership of the Weatherman faction of the original Students for a Democratic Society of the 1960s.

In an article published October 23, 2023, in The Nation, Isserman explained in detail why he had resigned from the Democratic Socialists of America after 41 years as a member to protest that organization's response to the October 7 attacks in Israel by Hamas.

== Awards ==
- 2008: National Outdoor Book Award, Fallen Giants (with Stewart Weaver).

== Works ==
=== Books ===
- Isserman, Maurice. (1982) Which Side Were You On? The American Communist Party during the Second World War. ISBN 978-0-252-06336-7
- Isserman, Maurice. (1987). If I Had a Hammer... The Death of the Old Left and the Birth of the New Left. ISBN 0-465-03197-8
- Isserman, Maurice & Healey Dorothy. (1990). Dorothy Healey Remembers: A Life in the American Communist Party. ISBN 0-19-503819-3
  - Reprinted as California Red: A Life in the American Communist Party (1993). ISBN 978-0-252-06278-0
- Isserman, Maurice & Bowman, John Stewart. (1992). America at War: The Korean War. ISBN 978-0816026883
- Isserman, Maurice. (1995). Witness to War: Vietnam. ISBN 978-0399521621
- Isserman, Maurice. (1997). Journey to Freedom: The African American Great Migration. ISBN 9780816034130
- Isserman, Maurice & Kazin, Michael. (2000). America Divided: The Civil War of the 1960s. ISBN 0-19-516047-9
- Isserman, Maurice. (2000).The Other American: The Life of Michael Harrington. ISBN 1-58648-036-7
- Isserman, Maurice & Bowman, John. (2005). Exploring North America, 1800-1900. ISBN 0816052638
- Isserman, Maurice & Weaver, Stewart. (2008). Fallen Giants: The History of Himalayan Mountaineering from the Age of Empire to the Age of Extremes. ISBN 978-0300164206
- Isserman, Maurice & Bowman, John Stewart. (2010). America at War: World War II. ISBN 978-0816081851
- Isserman, Maurice; Kenan, William R.; & Bowman, John Stewart. (2010). America at War: Vietnam War. ISBN 978-0816081875
- Isserman, Maurice & Bowman, John Stewart. (2010). Across America: The Lewis And Clark Expedition. ISBN 9781604131925
- Isserman, Maurice. (2011). On The Hill: A Bicentennial History of Hamilton College 1812–2012. ISBN 978-0615432090
- Cronkite, Walter & Isserman, Maurice. (2013). Cronkite's War: His World War II Letters Home. ISBN 978-1426210198
- Isserman, Maurice. (2016). Continental Divide: A History of American Mountaineering. ISBN 978-0393353761
- Isserman, Maurice. (2019). The Winter Army: The World War II Odyssey of the 10th Mountain Division, America's Elite Alpine Warriors. ISBN 978-1328871435
- Isserman, Maurice. (2024). Reds: The Tragedy of American Communism. ISBN 978-1541620032

=== Articles ===
On October 20, 2017, Isserman contributed to "Red Century," a New York Times centenary series about the Bolshevik Revolution, with the article "When New York City Was the Capital of American Communism."

- "How Old is the New SDS?" The Chronicle of Higher Education (October 19, 2007)
- "The Flower in the Gun Barrel," The Chronicle of Higher Education (October 19, 2007)
- "3 Days of Peace and Music, 40 Years of Memory," The Chronicle of Higher Education (October 19, 2007)
- "When New York City Was the Capital of American Communism," New York Times "Red Century" series (October 20, 2017)

== See also ==
- Historians of American Communism
