= Peter Way =

American historian

- Born: 1957 (age 68–69); Belleville, Ontario, Canada

Academic background
- Education: Trent University; Queen's University at Kingston; University of Maryland, College Park

Academic work
- Discipline: History
- Institutions: Bowling Green State University; University of Windsor

Peter Way (born 1957) is a Canadian historian of America and the Atlantic world.

== Life ==
Born in Belleville, Ontario, he graduated from Trent University in 1981, Queen's University with an M.A. in 1983, and University of Maryland, College Park with a Ph.D., in 1991.

Dr. Way taught at the University of Sussex from 1989 to 2001, and Bowling Green State University, while Department Chair, from 2001 to 2006. He then chaired the History Department at the University of Windsor from 2006 to 2011, where he now teaches.

== Awards ==
- 1994 Frederick Jackson Turner Award, for Common Labour: Workers and the Digging of North American Canals, 1760–1860
- 1994 Philip Taft Labor History Book Award for Common Labour by the School of Industrial and Labor Relations at Cornell University.
- 1994 Binkley-Stephenson Award by the Organization of American Historians for “Evil Humors and Ardent Spirits: The Rough Culture of Canal Construction Laborers,” Journal of American History (March 1993).
- 2001 Harold L. Peterson Award awarded by Eastern National for the best article on American military history given to “Rebellion of the Regulars: Working Soldiers and the Mutiny of 1763-1764,” William and Mary Quarterly, 3rd Ser., vol. 57, no. 4 (Oct. 2000), 761-92.
- 2007 Faculty of Arts and Social Sciences Dean’s Special Recognition Award for Research, Scholarship, and Creative Activity (co-winner), University of Windsor.
- 2013 Established Scholar Excellence in Research, Scholarship and Creative Activity Award, University of Windsor.

== Works ==
- "Soldiers of Misfortune: New England Regulars and the Fall of Oswego, 1755–1756", Massachusetts Historical Review, Vol. 3, 2001
- Peter Way (1993). Common labour: workers and the digging of North American canals, 1780-1860. Cambridge University Press. ISBN 978-0-521-44033-2.
- Martin Daunton; Rick Halpern, eds. (February 1, 1999). "The Cutting Edge of Culture: British Soldiers Encounter Native Americans in the French and Indian War". Empire and Others: British Encounters with Indigenous Peoples, 1600-1850. University of Pennsylvania Press. ISBN 978-0-8122-1699-8.

=== Criticism ===
- "Reviews of Books: The Dominion of War: Empire and Liberty in North America, 1500–2000", The William and Mary Quarterly, April 2006
- "Review: Through So Many Dangers: The Memoirs and Adventures of Robert Kirk, Late of the Royal Highland Regiment", The Canadian Historical Review, Volume 87, Number 3, September 2006

=== Current research ===
Making War: Common Soldiers and the Forging of Britain’s Atlantic Empire in the Seven Years' War. This study treats soldiers as laborers and the professional army of the time as an essential component to the fiscal-military state that protected merchant capital in the imperial environment. The book examines the British state, empire and army in the 18th century, casting warfare in economic terms as an instrument of the primitive accumulation of capital. The book is contracted to University of Pennsylvania Press.
