= Philip Taft Labor History Book Award =

United States labor history book award

- Type: Book award
- Awarded for: Labor history
- Description: Named in honor of Philip Taft
- Sponsored by: Cornell University School of Industrial and Labor Relations & Labor and Working-Class History Association
- Established: 1978; 48 years ago
- Website: Award page

The Philip Taft Labor History Book Award is sponsored by the Cornell University School of Industrial and Labor Relations in cooperation with the Labor and Working-Class History Association for books relating to labor history of the United States. Labor history is considered "in a broad sense to include the history of workers (free and unfree, organized and unorganized), their institutions, and their workplaces, as well as the broader historical trends that have shaped working-class life, including but not limited to: immigration, slavery, community, the state, race, gender, and ethnicity." The award is named after the noted labor historian Philip Taft (1902–1976).

== Recipients ==
Source: ILR School, Cornell University

- 1978 – David M. Katzman for Seven Days a Week: Women and Domestic Service in Industrializing America
- 1979 – August Meier and Elliott Rudwick for Black Detroit and the Rise of the UAW
- 1980 - no award made
- 1981 – James A. Gross for Reshaping of the National Labor Relations Board: A Study in Economics, Politics, and the Law
- 1982 – co-winners: Alice Kessler-Harris for Out to Work: A History of Wage-Earning Women in the United States; and Howell John Harris for The Right to Manage: Industrial Relations Policies of American Business in the 1940s
- 1983 – Walter Licht for Working for the Railroad
- 1984 – co-winners: Paul Avrich for The Haymarket Tragedy; and Robert Zieger for Rebuilding the Pulp and Paper Workers' Union, 1933–1941
- 1985 – Jacqueline Jones for Labor of Love, Labor of Sorrow: Black Women, Work, and the Family from Slavery to the Present
- 1986 – Alexander Keyssar for Out of Work: The First Century of Unemployment in Massachusetts
- 1987 – Jacquelyn Dowd Hall, James Leloudis, Robert Korstad, Mary Murphy, Christopher B. Daly, and Lu Ann Jones for Like a Family: The Making of a Southern Cotton Mill World
- 1988 – Alan Derickson for Workers' Health, Workers' Democracy: The Western Miners Struggle, 1891–1925
- 1989 – co-winners: Joshua Freeman for In Transit: The Transport Workers Union in New York City, 1933–1966; and Philip Scranton for Figured Tapestry: Production, Markets and Power in Philadelphia Textiles, 1855–1941
- 1990 – Lizabeth Cohen for Making a New Deal: Industrial Workers in Chicago, 1919–1939
- 1991 – Steve Fraser for Labor Will Rule: Sidney Hillman and the Rise of American Labor
- 1992 – Douglas Flamming for Creating the Modern South: Millhands and Managers in Dalton, Georgia, 1884–1984
- 1993 – Peter Way for Common Labour: Workers and the Digging of North American Canals, 1780–1860
- 1994 – Eileen Boris for Home to Work: Motherhood and the Politics of Industrial Homework in the U.S.
- 1995 – Robert Zieger for The CIO, 1935–1955
- 1996 – Thomas J. Sugrue for The Origins of the Urban Crisis: Race and Inequality in Postwar Detroit
- 1997 – Sanford M. Jacoby for Modern Manors: Welfare Capitalism Since the New Deal
- 1999 – Joseph McCartin for Labor's Great War: The Struggle for Industrial Democracy and the Origins of Modern American Labor Relations, 1912–1921
- 2000 – Jefferson R. Cowie for Capital Moves: RCA's 70-Year Quest for Cheap Labor
- 2001 – Gunther Peck for Reinventing Free Labor: Padrones and Immigrant Workers in the North American West, 1880–1930
- 2002 – Alice Kessler-Harris for In Pursuit of Equity: Women, Men, and the Quest for Economic Citizenship in 20th Century America
- 2003 – Nelson Lichtenstein for State of the Union: A Century of American Labor
- 2004 – co-winners: Frank Tobias Higbie for Indispensable Outcasts: Hobo Workers and Community in the American Midwest, 1880–1930; and Robert Korstad for Civil Rights Unionism: Tobacco Workers and the Struggle for Democracy in the Mid-Twentieth-Century South
- 2005 – Dorothy Sue Cobble for The Other Women's Movement: Workplace Justice and Social Rights in Modern America
- 2006 – James N. Gregory for The Southern Diaspora: How the Great Migrations of Black and White Southerners Transformed America
- 2007 – Nancy MacLean for Freedom Is Not Enough: The Opening of the American Workplace
- 2008 – Laurie B. Green for Battling the Plantation Mentality: Memphis and the Black Freedom Struggle
- 2009 - co-winners: Thavolia Glymph for Out of the House of Bondage: The Transformation of the Plantation Household; and Jana K. Lipman for Guantánamo: A Working-Class History between Empire and Revolution
- 2010 - Seth Rockman for Scraping By: Wage Labor, Slavery, and Survival in Early Baltimore
- 2011 - James D. Schmidt for Industrial Violence and the Legal Origins of Child Labor
- 2012 - Cindy Hahamovitch for No Man's Land: Jamaican Guestworkers in America and the Global History of Deportable Labor
- 2013 – co-winners: Matt Garcia for From the Jaws of Victory: The Triumph and Tragedy of Cesar Chavez and the Farm Worker Movement; and Kimberley Phillips for War! What Is It Good For?: Black Freedom Struggles and the U.S. Military from World War II to Iraq
- 2014 - Matthew L. Basso for Meet Joe Copper: Masculinity and Race on Montana’s World War II Home Front
- 2015 - Sven Beckert for Empire of Cotton: A Global History (Knopf)
- 2016 - co-winners: Nancy Woloch for A Class by Herself: Protective Laws for Women Workers, 1890s-1990s; and Talitha L. LeFlouria for Chained in Silence: Black Women and Convict Labor in the New South
- 2017 - LaShawn Harris for Sex Workers, Psychics, and Numbers Runners: Black Women in New York City's Underground Economy
- 2018 - Sarah F. Rose for No Right to Be Idle: The Invention of Disability, 1840s-1930s
- 2019 - co-winners: Peter Cole (Historian) for Dockworker Power: Race and Activism in Durban and the San Francisco Bay Area; and Joshua Freeman for Behemoth: A History of the Factory and the Making of the Modern World
- 2020 - Vincent DiGirolamo for Crying the News: A History of America's Newsboys.
- 2021 - Nate Holdren for Injury Impoverished: Workplace Accidents, Capitalism, and Law in the Progressive Era
- 2022 - Sonia Hernández for For a Just and Better World: Engendering Anarchism in the Mexican Borderlands, 1900-1938 (joint recipient)
- 2022 - Stephanie Hinnershitz for Japanese American Incarceration: The Camps and Coerced Labor During World War II (joint recipient)
- 2023 - Steven Beda for Strong Winds and Widow Makers: Workers, Nature, and Environmental Conflict in Pacific Northwest Timber Country
- 2024 - co-winners: Margot Canaday for Queer Career: Sexuality and Work in Modern America; and Blair L.M. Kelley for Black Folk: The Roots of the Black Working Class
- 2025 - Seth Rockman for Plantation Goods: A Material History of American Slavery

== See also ==
- List of history awards
