= Labor (journal) =

Labor: Studies in Working-Class History
- Discipline: Labor studies
- Language: English
- Edited by: Julie Greene

Publication details
- Former name: Labor: Studies in Working-Class History of the Americas
- History: 2004–present
- Publisher: Duke University Press (United States)
- Frequency: Quarterly
- Impact factor: 0.1 (2022)

Standard abbreviations
- ISO 4: Labor

Indexing
- ISSN: 1547-6715 (print); 1558-1454 (web)
- LCCN: 2003202572
- OCLC no.: 958655780

Links
- Journal homepage; Online access; Online archive

Labor: Studies in Working-Class History is a quarterly peer-reviewed academic journal covering the history of the labor movement in the United States, including unions, non-union agricultural work, slavery, unpaid and domestic labor, informal employment, and other topics. While the primary focus is on the United States, the journal also covers labor movements in North and South America as well as transnational comparisons that shed light on the American labor movement. It is the official journal of the Labor and Working-Class History Association and is published by Duke University Press. The editor-in-chief is Julie Greene (University of Maryland, College Park) who took over the role when the founding editor, Leon Fink (University of Illinois at Chicago), stepped down in July 2023.

While primarily focused on articles and book reviews, Labor also contains sections designed to broaden labor history. The “Contemporary Affairs” section offers labor historians concerned with the search for “a usable past” a platform to address contemporary problems of workers and their unions. “Up for Debate” allows for a focused argument by several scholars on an important theme. “The Common Verse” displays a diversity of poems that give voice to American workers. “Arts and Media" explores themes and representations of labor and working-class culture, both historical and contemporary.

== History ==
The journal was established in February 2004 when Fink, along with the entire editorial board of Labor History and much of the staff, left that publication after a disagreement with publisher Routledge over the direction of the journal. According to Fink, the principal issue was maintaining the journal's editorial independence. Labor is endorsed by the Scholarly Publishing and Academic Resources Coalition, as a SPARC Alternative. In 2016 the board voted to adjust the subtitle to Labor: Studies in Working-Class History to reflect a new transnational scope that stretched beyond the Western hemisphere.

When Julie Greene took over editorship of the journal in 2023, Labor underwent a sweeping revitalization. Labor introduced a collaborative editorial structure; a redesigned layout and full-color cover; a new and more diverse group of contributing editors; and reimagined offerings, including expanded public-facing programming, a redesigned foreign-language translation prize, and a new section on public history. These changes have expanded the journal’s scope, deepened its public engagement, and elevated its global reach. Shennette Garrett-Scott and Jessica Wilkerson joined the team as senior associate editors to help steer the journal’s direction and editing.

The journal also underwent a full redesign of the journal’s visual identity Volume 22 (2025) debuted a full-color cover, redesigned layout. Labor also launched new initiatives: the December 2025 issue (Labor 22:4) inaugurated a new section, Going Public, which explores the current state of public labor history. LABOR also partnered with leading journals across Latin America to launch a Foreign Language Article Prize which translates and publishes the best Spanish- or Portuguese-language article on labor history.

== Abstracting and indexing ==
The journal is abstracted and indexed in:

- EBSCO databases
- Emerging Sources Citation Index
- MLA International Bibliography
- Scopus
- Sociological Abstracts

According to the Journal Citation Reports, the journal has a 2022 impact factor of 0.1.

== Awards ==
Labor was chosen "Best New Journal" by the Council of Editors of Learned Journals in 2005.

Labor won the CELJ's "Phoenix Award for Significant Editorial or Design Achievement" in 2025 for its "significant revitalization effort," which "connected a new, appealing visual identity with an extensive overhaul of the journal's leadership, content... languages... and activities."
