= Historians of American Communism =

Academic association to study US communism

Historians of American Communism (HOAC)
- Formation: April 2, 1982; 44 years ago
- Founder: Lowell Dyson, Hyman Berman, Max Gordon, John Earl Haynes, Harvey Klehr, William Pratt
- Headquarters: Tamiment Library at New York University
- Location: New York City, USA
- Products: American Communist History
- Official language: English
- President: Vernon L. Pedersen
- Vice President: Denise Lynn
- Board of directors: Timothy V. Johnson, Katherine A. S. Sibley, James G. Ryan, Randi J. Storch
- Website: historianscommunism.com

Historians of American Communism (HOAC) is a national academic association, established in 1982, bringing together historians, political scientists, and independent scholars interested in the study of the Communist Party of the United States of America (CPUSA) and other communist and anti-communist organizations in the United States. The society publishes a semi-annual journal, American Communist History, produced by the British academic publisher Routledge. The organization also maintains an internet newsgroup on H-Net.

== Organizational history ==
=== Formation ===
In March 1982, historian Lowell Dyson invited scholars interested in the history of the American Communist Party (CPUSA) to attend an organizational meeting held in conjunction with the 1982 Convention of the Organization of American Historians in Philadelphia. This meeting was held on April 2, 1982, with Dyson occupying the chair. Dyson noted that a chance meeting of several historians interested in various aspects of American Communism in which he participated at the 1980 Upper Midwest History Conference in Duluth, Minnesota had yielded productive discussion and he suggested that a new national organization of individuals interested in such matters might provide a forum for a mutually beneficial exchange of ideas. The small circle who had participated in the informal 1980 conclave had constituted themselves a General Organizing Board for such a new group, an organization tentatively called "The John Reed Club."

The organizers envisioned a society which would help interested scholars make contact with one another to exchange in academic discourse. The group would additionally publish information about research in progress, it was hoped, as well as aid in the search for obscure sources — no simple task in the days before easily searchable library catalogs via the internet. Further, organizers sought a place to where one might take esoteric questions about little-known aspects of American communism and hope to find an answer.

Discussion at the organizational meeting centered around the parameters of the organization, with some arguing in favor of inclusion of other radical political organizations outside of the CPUSA, while others sought a more limited and tightly focused orientation. It was decided that a concentration upon the history of the CPUSA alone would make for a more useful organization in its initial phase.

As objection was raised to the political connotation of naming the organization after John Reed, a founding member of the American Communist Party, a new name was called for. The gathering decided upon the name "Historians of American Communism." A second meeting of the organization was called for later in 1982, to be held in conjunction with the convention of the American Historical Association (AHA) in Washington, D.C.

The General Organizing Board of the new organization approved by the April 2, 1982, meeting consisted of Hyman Berman of the University of Minnesota; Lowell Dyson of Alexandria, Virginia; Max Gordon of New York City; John Earl Haynes of Washington, D.C.; Harvey Klehr of Emory University; and William Pratt of the University of Nebraska–Lincoln. A two-page mimeographed newsletter was published by Haynes, entitled Newsletter of the Historians of American Communism — a publication which would continue uninterrupted through the summer of 2004.

No organizational dues were set for 1982, but a $5 membership fee was levied for 1983, with proceeds to pay for production of the newsletter, projected to be a quarterly.

=== Development of the organization ===
The second meeting of the Historians of American Communism was held in December 1982 in conjunction with the annual convention of the AHA. At that gathering, the General Organizing Board distributed copies of a draft constitution and bylaws for the organization. After a discussion about possible changes, the Board announced that a revised draft would be subsequently mailed out to all members after the first of the year for approval or rejection.

Ballots were sent out early in March 1983, with the mail election closing on the 29th of that month. The draft constitution was duly approved.

The constitution of HOAC lists as the organization's objective "To stimulate interest in, promote the study of, and facilitate research and publication on the history of American Communism."

HOAC's system of office was convoluted. The organization was to feature four officers: a President, Vice President, General Secretary, and Treasurer. Vice Presidents were to automatically succeed to the office of president in the subsequent year and were thus to be the chief competitive election. A nominating committee appointed by the President was to provide one nominee, with others added to the list by membership petition. A six-member Central Committee, elected to a three-year term, was to directly appoint the General Secretary and Treasurer, who would join the Central Committee, along with the President and Vice President and the three most recent past presidents. This Central Committee was to meet annually at a time and place determined at its pleasure. Dues were formally set at $5 per annum by the constitution, with a special life membership made available to anyone contributing $1,000 or more to the organization. This dues rate remained in effect until 1990, when dues moved to a rate of $10 per annum by decision of the HOAC Central Committee. Dues rose again in 2002, this time to $25 per year, due to the launch of a new academic journal, subscriptions to which were included in the cost of membership dues.

Elected as first President of the organization was Hyman Berman, with Harvey Klehr elected vice president. The six members of the initial Central Committee were elected for staggered terms: John Haynes and Max Gordon for a three-year term, Daniel Leab and Ellen Schrecker for a two-year term, and Kenneth Waltzer and David J. Garrow for a one-year term. Thereafter, two of the six members would come up for election each year.

A membership list published in September 1985 indicated that HOAC had a paid membership of 117 for that year.

In the Spring of 1986, HOAC President Harvey Klehr asked Dan Leab to assume the role of "Executive Secretary" of the organization (originally called "General Secretary" in the HOAC constitution). Leab continued in this position until his death in 2016.

=== Function of the organization ===
Throughout its first 20 years of existence, HOAC's primary function related to its compilation and publication of a listing of "Writings on the History of American Communism." Begun by John Haynes in 1982, this task was later taken over by Peter Filardo, an archivist at Tamiment Library, located at New York University. Haynes converted this material and further additions to digital form in the 1990s, a listing which he continues to maintain on his personal website into the 21st Century. The organization also publicized "Research in Progress" and "Recent Publications and Papers by Members" in its quarterly newsletter. The organization also fostered the exchange of primary source materials gathered from the Federal Bureau of Investigation under the Freedom of Information Act.

== Publications ==
=== American Communist History journal ===
Beginning in 2002, HOAC began the publication of a semi-annual academic journal, American Communist History. This marked a move for HOAC from its previous function of facilitating and chronicling academic publications in other venues to actually engaging in academic publication itself. American Communist History is a scholarly journal with the worthiness of submitted articles anonymously juried by recognized experts in the field prior to their acceptance for publication. Editor of the publication from its first issue through 2016 was Daniel J. Leab of Seton Hall University.

At the time of the new journal's launch, HOAC Editor John Haynes defined the purpose of the new publication:

American Communist History will be the impartial, leading journal for scholarship about the history of the Communist Party in the United States and its social, political, economic and cultural impact on its members, on its opponents, and the public at large. The journal will deal with the American party and with the various outside influences which have dealt with its representation, with the controversial folklore that has been engendered about it, and with the many differing views about its antecedents, and its diverse opponents on the Left and Right. While rooted in the United States, the journal welcomes contributions which are transnational or international in scope.

=== HOAC newsgroup ===
In March 2003, HOAC launched its own newsgroup via the academic newsgroup coordinator, H-Net. In the initial post announcing the new forum, co-moderator of the forum John Haynes wrote:

H-HOAC has several tasks. It will provide a forum for discussion of the history of American communism and domestic anticommunism. It is, however, also a place to report on research in progress, recent publications, openings of archival resources, raise research questions, and provide information about upcoming conferences and symposia or to report on what happened... Historical scholarship is in part the lonely task of a historian in the archive studying documents and then writing in isolation. But we write so that others will read, and if others do not know about what we write, they cannot read it. We hope authors will send in brief announcements of new publications with complete citations and, if one wishes, a short annotation describing the essay... We hope scholars of American communism and anticommunism will treat H-HOAC as a common forum for the exchange of scholarly gossip (civilly worded) about who is writing what.

=== Newsletter of the Historians of American Communism ===
The 2002 advent of American Communist History, and its regular announcement of new publications, and the H-HOAC newsgroup, and its regular announcement of research in progress and exchange of information about various esoteric research issues, made the continuation of the Newsletter of the Historians of American Communism moot. That publication terminated publication effective with the July 2004 issue.

== Presidents of HOAC ==
- Hyman Berman (1983–1984)
- Harvey Klehr (1984–1987)
- Lowell Dyson (1987–1989)
- Robert "Bob" Zieger (1989–1992)
- John Earl Haynes (1992–1994)
- Rosalyn Baxandall (1995–1997)
- Ronald Radosh (1997–1999)
- Ronald Cohen (2000–2003)
- Richard Gid Powers (2004–2007?)
- Maurice Isserman (2009)
- James G. Ryan (2010–2018)
- Vernon L. Pedersen (2018–present)
