= Labor History (journal) =

Academic journal

- Discipline: Labor Studies
- Language: English
- Edited by: Craig Phelan

Publication details
- Former name(s): The Labor Historian's Bulletin (1953–1960); Newsletter (1967–1968)
- History: 1953–present
- Publisher: Routledge
- Frequency: Quarterly

Standard abbreviations
- ISO 4: Labor Hist.

Indexing
- ISSN: 0023-656X (print); 1469-9702 (web)
- LCCN: 61037555
- OCLC no.: 01755402

Links
- Journal homepage; Online access; Online archives

Labor History is a peer-reviewed academic journal which publishes articles regarding the history of the labor movement in the United States, Europe, and other regions and countries.

== Publication history ==
The journal was established in 1953 as the Labor Historian's Bulletin (ISSN 0456-9644), and later incorporated Newsletter (OCLC 16812578). In 1960, the journal changed its name to Labor History and was being published by the Tamiment Institute, later to be published by CarFax, a subsidiary of Taylor & Francis. In 2003 the journal was sold to Taylor and Francis. Following conflicts with the new publisher over editorial independence, editor-in-chief Leon Fink, the entire editorial board, and much of the editorial staff left to establish a rival journal, Labor: Studies in Working-Class History.

The journal is currently published by Routledge, an imprint of Taylor and Francis. The current editor is Craig Phelan of Solidarity Center (Abuja, Nigeria), US editor Gerald Friedman of the University of Massachusetts-Amherst, and book review editor John Trumpbour of Harvard University.

Since 2013, the journal is being published 5 times a year.

== Abstracting and indexing ==
The journal is abstracted and/or indexed in Alternative Press Index, America: History and Life, Historical Abstracts, Political Science Complete, Scopus, SocINDEX, and Web of Science.

== Editors ==
In 1974, Daniel Leab became editor and served the journal for more than two decades.

== Awards ==
Each year, Labor History awards a number of writing prizes. Honors are given to the best essay on an American topic, best essay on a non-American or comparative topic, best essay written by a scholar within five years of completion of their Ph.D., best labor-themed dissertation, and best book on labor.
