= Katharine Kyes Leab =

American publisher and editor (1941–2020)

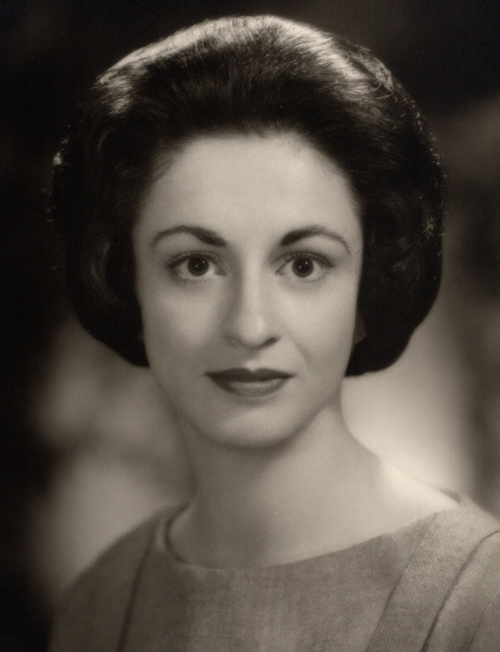
- Katharine Kyes Leab (1960s)
- Born: Katharine Kyes; March 17, 1941; Cleveland, Ohio, US
- Died: February 16, 2020 (aged 78); Washington, Connecticut, US
- Other name: Katharine Leab
- Education: Smith College
- Occupations: Publisher, editor, expert in rare books and manuscripts
- Spouse: Daniel Leab
- Children: 3
- Father: Roger M. Kyes

Katharine Kyes Leab (17 March 1941 – 16 February 2020) was an American publisher, expert on rare books and manuscripts, and co-owner and editor-in-chief of American Book Prices Current, known as "the grande dame of book auction data."

== Background ==
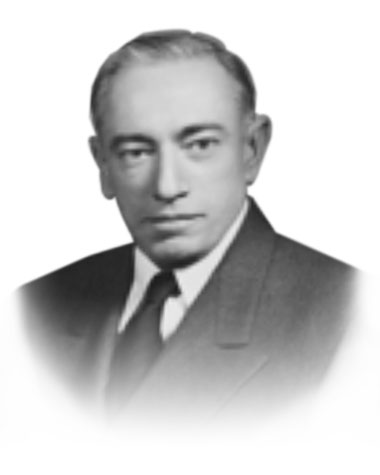
Father Roger M. Kyes was a General Motors executive who served as Deputy Secretary of Defense under President Eisenhower in the 1950s

Katharine Kyes was born on March 17, 1941, in Cleveland, Ohio. Her parents were Helen Gilmore Jacoby and Roger Martin Kyes, a General Motors executive who served as Deputy Secretary of Defense under U.S. President Dwight David Eisenhower. Kyes grew up at first in Marion, Ohio, and spent most of her youth in Bloomfield Hills, Michigan. She attended the Kingswood School Cranbrook, except a sophomore year at the Emma Willard School. In 1962, Kyes graduated from Smith College with a BA in English, Phi Beta Kappa. While at Columbia University for graduate studies she met and married Daniel Leab in 1964, after which she was known as Katharine Kyes Leab.

== Career ==
=== American Book Prices Current (ABPC) ===
In 1972, Leab and her husband took ownership of American Book Prices Current (ABPC). ABPC, established in 1895, records books, manuscripts, autographs, maps, and broadsides sold at auction in much of the world. It focuses on North America and the United Kingdom but also tracks countries including Switzerland, Germany, Monaco, the Netherlands, Australia, and France. Leab served as co-owner and editor-in-chief for more than four decades.

American Book Prices Current represents the longest continuous and most reliable record of the progress of book prices in the world. With new technology advancing thus, and no sign that the material upon which the record is based is diminishing, we may confidently predict a future at least as long as its past for ABPC.

— Nicolas Barker

Leab adapted ABPC with major 20th-century technical changes in book publishing. In 1994, she began publishing American Book Prices Current on CD-ROM through 2006. In 2006, she introduced "ABPC on a Stick" (a USB drive). In 2007, she converted ABPC into an online database, which offers data back to 1975.

=== Other ===
In addition to her own business, Leab wrote and spoke widely and passionately about books, book collecting, and stopping the theft of rare books and manuscripts. She contributed pieces to Seven Days, the Wall Street Journal, the Times Literary Supplement, and both the New York Times and New York Times Book Review.

Leab became so troubled by increasing theft of rare book and manuscript from libraries that in the 1980s she created and maintained Bookline Alert Missing Books and Manuscripts ("BAMBAM"), a registry of thefts to help both law enforcement and libraries could alert each other. As she later recounting in 2016, she became involved when hearing that book thieves were using her American Book Prices Current as a guide to picking the most valuable books to steal, once they had broken in.

== Personal life and death ==
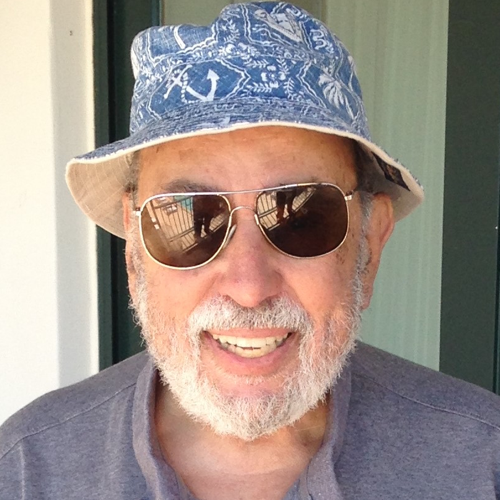
In 1964, Kyes married Daniel Leab (here, 2016), American historian of 20th-century history, particularly the history of American labor unions.

In 1964, Kyes married Daniel Leab; they had two daughters and a son.

In the mid-1970s, the Leabs bought a house in Washington, Connecticut, where they began to live full-time in 1983. She served as a trustee of the Washington Montessori School in the 1980s. Both Leab and her husband served on local community organizations, including the zoning board of appeals in the 2000s and 2010s. In mid-2017, Leab moved home and business to South Burlington, Vermont.

Leab's husband often credited her in his own books. In I Was a Communist for the FBI, he wrote that she "saved me from many a folly." With self-deprecating humor, he expressed thanks "to my wife Katharine Kyes Leab, who has lived with Labor History for over a decade... and never, well hardly ever, complained about the demands made by this journalistic interloper."

Leab died age 78 on February 16, 2020, in Washington, Connecticut.

== Legacy ==
=== American Book Prices Current ===
At Leab's death, Sally Burdon, president of the International League of Antiquarian Booksellers, said "Kathy was a real contributor to the antiquarian book world as I think a great many people will be aware. She will be remembered and missed by booksellers around the world. ILAB pays its respect to Ms Leab and her achievements for the rare book trade." Abigail Leab Martin, Leab's daughter, has added Books to her earlier Autographs and Manuscripts Editor role.

=== Leab Awards ===
Leab was active in the Rare Books and Manuscripts Section of the Association of College and Research Libraries (ACRL) as well as a member of the Bibliographical Society of America. For the ACRL, Leab and her husband endowed a fund the "Leab Awards" to celebrate excellence in library exhibition catalogs. Leab and her husband, publishers of American Book Prices Current underwrote the awards, formally known as "The Katharine Kyes Leab and Daniel J. Leab American Book Prices Current Exhibition Catalogue Awards." The awards were made from 1986 and continue to be made annually.

=== Daniel J. and Katharine Kyes Leab Collection of Book Auction Ephemera ===
Leab and her husband left ephemera related to book auctions at the end of the twentieth century, open for research.

=== Kyes, Roger M. & Kyes Family Papers ===
In 2003, Leab deposited nearly 50,000 papers of her father and family in the Eisenhower Library.

== Works ==
Articles: Articles include:

- "Appraisal" with Daniel Leab, Book Collecting: A Modern Guide (1977)
- "The OTHER Auction House in England" with Daniel Leab, Town and Country (1982)
- "The Auction Year" with Daniel Leab in Rare Books, 1983–1984 (1984)
- "Forgers and Scholars," New York Times (March 1984)
- "Tracking Down Rare Books: The Quietest Blood Sport," Collecting, Seven Days (July 1988)
- "My New Post Office Address Unknown," New York Times (March 1991)
- "Anthony Rota" with Daniel Leab (2002)
- "The Book: A CD–ROM History by Scottish Center for the History of the Book," Papers of the Bibliographical Society of America (2002)

Books: Books included:

- The Auction Companion with Daniel Leab (1981) )

Speeches:
Some of Leab's speeches (particularly at Rare Book School at the University of Virginia are available online, and include:

- "Collecting, Auctions, and the Book Trade" (2010)
- "That Was Then, This Is Now - But Our Love Is Here to Stay" (Keynote address for the Colorado Antiquarian Book Seminar, 2011)
- "H. Bradley Martin and Other Rare Birds: Collectors and their Astonished Families" (John Seltzer and Mark Seltzer Memorial Lecture at Thomas Fisher Rare Book Library, University of Toronto, 2011)
- "Marked Improvements: Provenance and Theft" (video) for Mind the Gap: Recent Provenance of Antiquarian Materials conference by The Grolier Club (2016)

== See also ==
- Daniel Leab
- Roger M. Kyes
- Rare Books and Manuscripts Section
