= Roger M. Kyes =

General Motors executive (1906–1971)

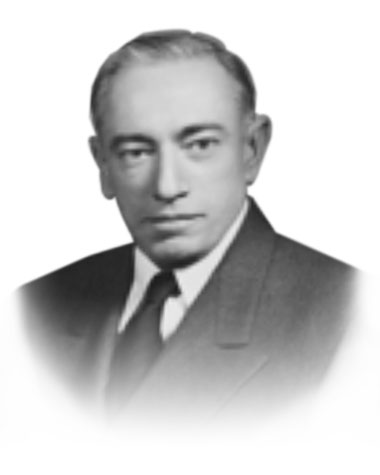

4th United States Deputy Secretary of Defense
- In office January 30, 1953 – May 1, 1954
- President: Dwight D. Eisenhower
- Preceded by: William Chapman Foster
- Succeeded by: Robert B. Anderson

Personal details
- Born: Rogers Martin Kyes; March 6, 1906 East Palestine, Ohio, U.S.
- Died: February 14, 1971 (aged 64) Columbus, Ohio
- Resting place: Kirk in the Hills Columbarium; Bloomfield Hills, Michigan; 42.58104°N 83.29429°W
- Spouse: Helen Gilmore Jacoby
- Children: Carolyn Kyes Eggert; Frances Elizabeth Kyes; Katharine Kyes Leab; Cynthia Anne Spence
- Parents: Lafayette Martin Kyes (father); Myra Eunice Rogers (mother)
- Education: Harvard University (Bachelor of Arts, Economics)
- Awards: Medal of Freedom; Air Force Exceptional Service Award (1956)

Roger Martin Kyes (March 6, 1906 – February 14, 1971), born Rogers Martin Kyes, was a General Motors executive who served as United States Deputy Secretary of Defense in 1953 during the Eisenhower administration.

== Background ==
Roger Martin Kyes was born in East Palestine, Ohio, on March 6, 1906, and was a graduate of Culver Military Academy (Summer Culver Naval School), the Rayen School at Youngstown, Ohio, and, in 1928, Harvard University with a Bachelor of Arts degree in economics.

== Career ==
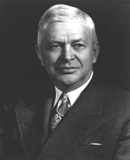
Kyes worked at GM for Charles Erwin Wilson, who brought him along to the DoD.

=== Industry ===
After graduation from Harvard, Kyes worked from 1928 to 1930 as an assistant to the president of the Glenn L. Martin Company in both Cleveland and Baltimore and then, from 1930 to 1932, as assistant to the vice president of the Black & Decker Mfg. Co. Kyes got his start in farm implements in 1932, as vice president running a Cleveland firm, the Empire Plow Company, which supplied implements to the Ferguson Company. In 1940, Harry Ferguson persuaded Kyes to join the Ferguson Company and Kyes relocated from Cleveland to Dearborn, Michigan. As executive vice president and general manager from 1941 to 1943 and president from 1943 to 1947 of the Ferguson‐Sherman Manufacturing Corporation in Detroit, Kyes was responsible for overseeing the firm's day-to-day business operations.

Kyes left the Ferguson Company in 1947, joining General Motors. In 1949, Kyes was appointed assistant general manager of the transit bus division (Truck and Coach Division) of General Motors Diesel Division. Kyes was responsible for the division in the period in which transit buses overtook streetcars as the primary form of public transport in most large American cities.

=== Government ===
In 1953, President of the United States Dwight D. Eisenhower named GM president Charles Erwin Wilson as United States Secretary of Defense. Wilson asked to be allowed to bring Kyes along, so, at Wilson's request, Eisenhower nominated Kyes as United States Deputy Secretary of Defense. Kyes was sworn in on February 2, 1953, and served as Deputy Secretary of Defense until May 1, 1954. Upon becoming Deputy Secretary of Defense, Kyes criticized the United States military-defense establishment as dominated by "unrealistic requirements, poor planning and inefficient execution . . . waste of money, poor utilization of manpower, unnecessary drain of materials from the civilian economy, and the inefficient use of tools, equipment and facilities." He slashed the defense budget in an attempt to improve efficiencies, in the process gaining himself the nickname of "Jolly Roger" because of his piratical ruthlessness. As Deputy Secretary, Kyes was a member of the Committee on International Information Activities.

Kyes agreed to come to Washington, D. C. for only a year, although Defense Secretary Wilson convinced Kyes to stay a few months longer to help explain the administration's "New Look" defense concept to the United States Congress. When some editors speculated that Kyes was leaving because he was afraid of being called before the McCarthy hearings, the tough minded Kyes said he was not afraid of a fight. President Eisenhower awarded Kyes the Medal of Freedom for his service to the country.

=== Industry again ===
Upon leaving government, Kyes returned to General Motors, becoming an Executive Vice President in 1965. In the 1960s, he clashed with John DeLorean.

In 1969, Kyes left General Motors to become chief executive officer of the American Steamship Company.

At the beginning of 1971 he joined Lazard Freres as a General Partner.

== Death ==
Kyes died of a heart attack in 1971 in Columbus, Ohio at the wedding reception of a niece.

== Legacy ==
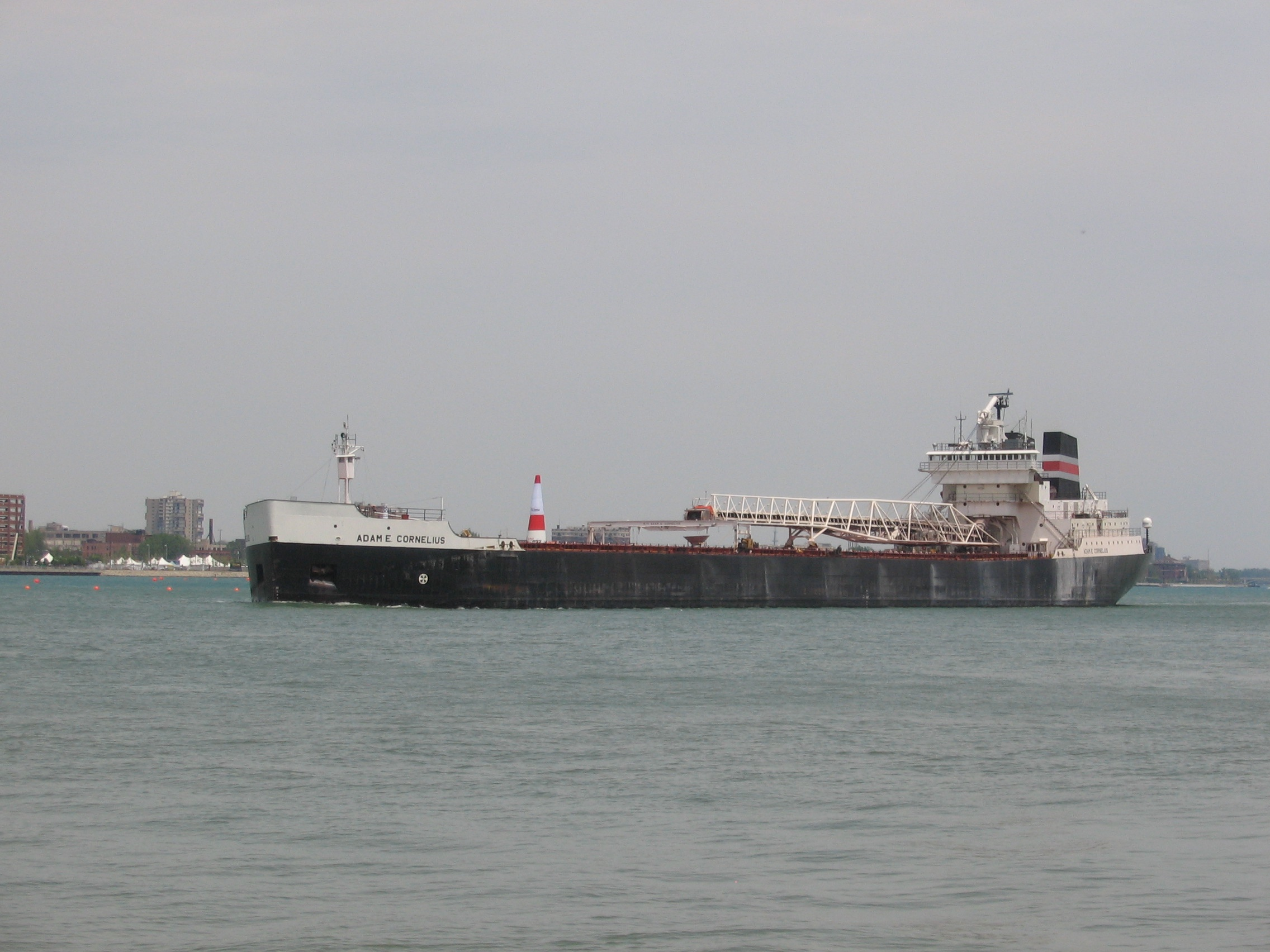
Adam E. Cornelius, formerly the Roger M. Kyes, downbound at Detroit.

The Algoma Compass (formerly the Roger M. Kyes) and (Adam E. Cornelius) is a self-unloading bulk carrier lake freighter built in Toledo, Ohio in 1973 for the American Steamship Company. An American Steamship Company vessel was christened the Roger M. Kyes in his honor on July 28, 1973 by his wife at Toledo, Ohio.

Kyes was active in the Presbyterian church. In 1954, he was ordained a Ruling Elder in the Church. From 1954 to 1960 and again from 1962 to 1965, he was Chairman of the Board of Trustees of Kirk in the Hills Church in Bloomfield Hills, Michigan.

== See also ==
- Katharine Kyes Leab

Political offices
Preceded by Robert A. Lovett	United States Deputy Secretary of Defense; February 2, 1953 – May 1, 1954	Succeeded by Robert B. Anderson
