= Leon Fink =

American historian

Leon Fink (born January 9, 1948) is a Distinguished Professor in the Department of History at the University of Illinois Chicago. A historian, his research and writing focuses on labor unions in the United States, immigration and the nature of work. He is the founding editor of Labor: Studies in Working-Class History, the premier journal of labor history in the United States.

== Early life and education ==
Fink was born in Ann Arbor, Michigan in 1948.

He received his B.A degree from Harvard University in 1970. While at Harvard, he spent the term from 1968 to 1969 studying at the Centre for the Study of Social History at the University of Warwick in Coventry, U.K.

He obtained his master's degree in 1971 and his doctorate in 1977, both from the University of Rochester, where he studied with Herbert Gutman.

== Career ==
After obtaining his master's degree, from 1972 to 1974 Fink was a lecturer in the Department of History at the City College of New York.

From 1983 to 1984, Fink was a Fulbright Program scholar at the Amerika-Institut at LMU Munich in West Germany.

In 1985, Fink was appointed an associate professor of history at the University of North Carolina at Chapel Hill (UNC). He became a full professor in 1990 and Zachary Smith Professor of History in 1995.

In 2000, Fink assumed a position as a professor in the Department of History at the University of Illinois Chicago.

== Research focus ==
Fink is considered a top scholar in U.S. and comparative labor history. He is an expert on the history of work, and on labor unions in the Gilded Age and the Progressive Era. More recently, his work has focus on the role of immigration historically and in the modern labor movement. He writes from the perspective of the "new labor history".

In 1991, Fink and UNC professor Lloyd Kramer founded the UNC Project for Historical Education (PHE). The program sponsors workshops on teaching history for elementary and secondary public school social studies teachers. The workshops focus on recent developments in historical research, strategies for integrating research into lesson plans, how to use primary documents in teaching, and other aspects of teaching history.

Fink's 1994 book, In Search of the Working Class: Essays in American Labor History and Political Culture, drew attention for its focus on the role of the historian. The essays in the book highlight the role of the historian as an outside observer of a basic unit of culture and economics as the worker, and what constitutes the "working class." The essays also cover the development of labor history in the United States from its inception in the 1880s as history through the institutionalist period to the "new labor history" period in vogue today. It concludes with an examination of the role history, culture, art and social movements play in American labor history and why scholars must focus on these factors in addition to workers and their organizations.

Fink's third book, 1998's Progressive Intellectuals and the Dilemmas of Democratic Commitment, drew attention in the field of history for its focus on the tension which arises when educated historians study relatively uneducated workers. Using biographies of some of the top labor historians and intellectuals in the field of labor studies, Fink illustrated the problems which can arise when historians try to learn from workers at the same time that they attempt to advise them.

In 1999, Fink established the "Listening for a Change" initiative at the Southern Oral History Program. "Listening for a Change" was designed to conduct oral histories of workers in order to document the on-the-ground history of the working class. In its first year, the program conducted 20 interviews with Guatemalan agricultural workers to illuminate how the influx of Hispanic workers is changing the nature of work in North Carolina.

In 2003, Fink helped establish the journal Labor: Studies in Working-Class History of the Americas. Fink had been editor-in-chief of the journal Labor History. In June 2003, Fink and the entire staff left Labor History in a dispute with the journal's publisher, Taylor and Francis. One editorial board member said the publisher wanted to increase the number of issues a year in order to justify an increase in the subscription price, even though the editorial staff felt there were not enough quality articles to fill additional issues.

== Memberships and awards ==
1998 was a year of many honors for Fink. He was appointed to the National Advisory Board of the Society for History Education, was named a fellow at the Charles Warren Center at Harvard University, and was named to the Organization of American Historians' (OAH) Merle Curti Prize Committee. That same year, he was elected to a three-year term as a vice president for the American Historical Association's (AHA) Teaching Division.

In 2000, Fink was named as the AHA's representative on the board of National Council for History Education.

In 2006, Fink was a lecturer in the OAH Distinguished Lectureship Program.

Fink is the editor of Labor: Studies in Working-Class History.

== Published works ==
=== Solely authored books ===
- Workingmen's Democracy: The Knights of Labor and American Politics. Champaign, Ill.: University of Illinois Press, 1983. ISBN 0-252-00999-1
- In Search of the Working Class: Essays in American Labor History and Political Culture. Champaign, Ill.: University of Illinois Press, 1994. ISBN 0-252-02077-4
- Progressive Intellectuals and the Dilemmas of Democratic Commitment. Cambridge, Mass.: Harvard University Press, 1998. ISBN 0-674-66160-5
- The Maya of Morganton: Work and Community in the Nuevo New South. Chapel Hill, N.C.: University of North Carolina Press, 2003. ISBN 0-8078-5447-6
- Sweatshops at Sea: Merchant Seamen in the World's First Globalized Industry, from 1812 to the Present. Chapel Hill, N.C.: University of North Carolina Press, 2011. ISBN 0-8078-3450-5

=== Co-edited books ===
- Fink, Leon, and Greenberg, Brian. Upheaval in the Quiet Zone: The History of Hospital Workers' Union, Local 1199. Champaign, Ill.: University of Illinois Press, 1989. ISBN 0-252-01545-2
- Fink, Leon; Leonard, Stephen T.; and Reid, Donald M. Intellectuals and Public Life: Between Radicalism and Reform. Ithaca, N.Y.: Cornell University Press, 1996. ISBN 0-8014-2794-0
- Fink, Leon and Paterson, Thomas. Major Problems in the Gilded Age and Progressive Era. 2nd ed. Boston: Houghton Mifflin, 2000. ISBN 0-618-04255-5

=== Solely-authored book chapters ===
- "The Uses of Politics: Towards a Theory of the Labor Movement in the Era of the Knights of Labor." In Working-Class America: Essays on Labor, Community, and American Society. Michael Frisch and Daniel Walkowitz, eds. Champaign, Ill.: University of Illinois, 1983. ISBN 0-252-00953-3
- "Working-Class Radicalism in the Gilded Age." In Conflict and Consensus in American History. 7th ed. Allen F. Davis and Harold D. Woodman, eds. Boston: Houghton Mifflin, 1988. ISBN 0-669-12802-3
- "Looking Backwards: Reflections on Workers' Culture and the Conceptual Dilemmas of the New Labor History." In Perspectives on American Labor History: The Problem of Synthesis. Alice Kessler-Harris and J. Carroll Moody, eds. Chicago: Northern Illinois University Press, 1989. ISBN 0-87580-150-1
- "Was the American Labor Movement Radical?" In Taking Sides: Clashing Views on Controversial Issues in American History. Volume II: Reconstruction to the Present. Larry Madaras and James M. SoRelle, eds. New York City: McGraw-Hill, 1989. ISBN 0-07-310218-0
- "American Labor History." In New American History. Eric Foner, ed. Philadelphia: Temple University Press, 1990. ISBN 0-87722-698-9
- "Expert Advice: Progressive Intellectuals and the Unraveling of Labor Reform, 1912-1915." In Intellectuals and Public Life: Between Radicalism and Reform. Leon Fink, Stephen T. Leonard, and Donald M. Reid, eds. Ithaca, N.Y.: Cornell University Press, 1996. ISBN 0-8014-2794-0
- "From Autonomy to Abundance: Changing Beliefs About the Free Labor System in Nineteenth Century America." In Terms of Labor: Slavery, Serfdom, and Free Labor. Stanley L. Engerman, ed. Stanford, Calif.: Stanford University Press, 1999. ISBN 0-8047-3521-2
- "The Maya of Morganton: Exploring Worker Identity Within the Global Marketplace." In The Maya Diaspora: Guatemalan Roots, American Lives. James Loucky and Marilyn M. Moors meds. Philadelphia: Temple University Press, 2000. ISBN 1-56639-794-4

=== Co-authored book chapters ===
- Fink, Leon and Greenberg, Brian. "Organizing Montefiore: Labor Militancy Meets a Progressive Health Empire." In Health Care in America: Essays in Social History. Susan Reverby and David Rosner, eds. Philadelphia: Temple University Press, 1979. ISBN 0-87722-153-7

=== Solely authored articles ===
- "John R. Commons, Herbert Gutman, and the Burden of Labor History." Labor History. 29 (Summer 1988).
- " 'Intellectuals' vs. 'Workers': Academic Requirements and the Creation of Labor History." American Historical Review. 96 (April 1991).
- "A Memoir of Selig Perlman and His Life at the University of Wisconsin: Based on an Interview of Mark Perlman." Labor History. 32 (Fall 1991).
- "Culture's Last Stand? Gender and the Search for Synthesis in American Labor History." Labor History. 34 (Spring-Summer 1993).
- "Early Labor Studies and the Dual Search for Legitimacy." Labor Law Journal. 49 (September 1998).
- "New Tidings for History Education, or Lessons We Should Have Learned by Now." History Teacher 34 (February 2001).
- "What Is To Be Done-In Labor History?" Labor History. 43 (November 2002).

=== Co-authored articles ===
- Fink, Leon and Levine, Susan. "Herbert G. Gutman." Labour/Le Travail. 16 (Fall 1985).
