= Ruth Milkman =

American sociologist (born 1954)

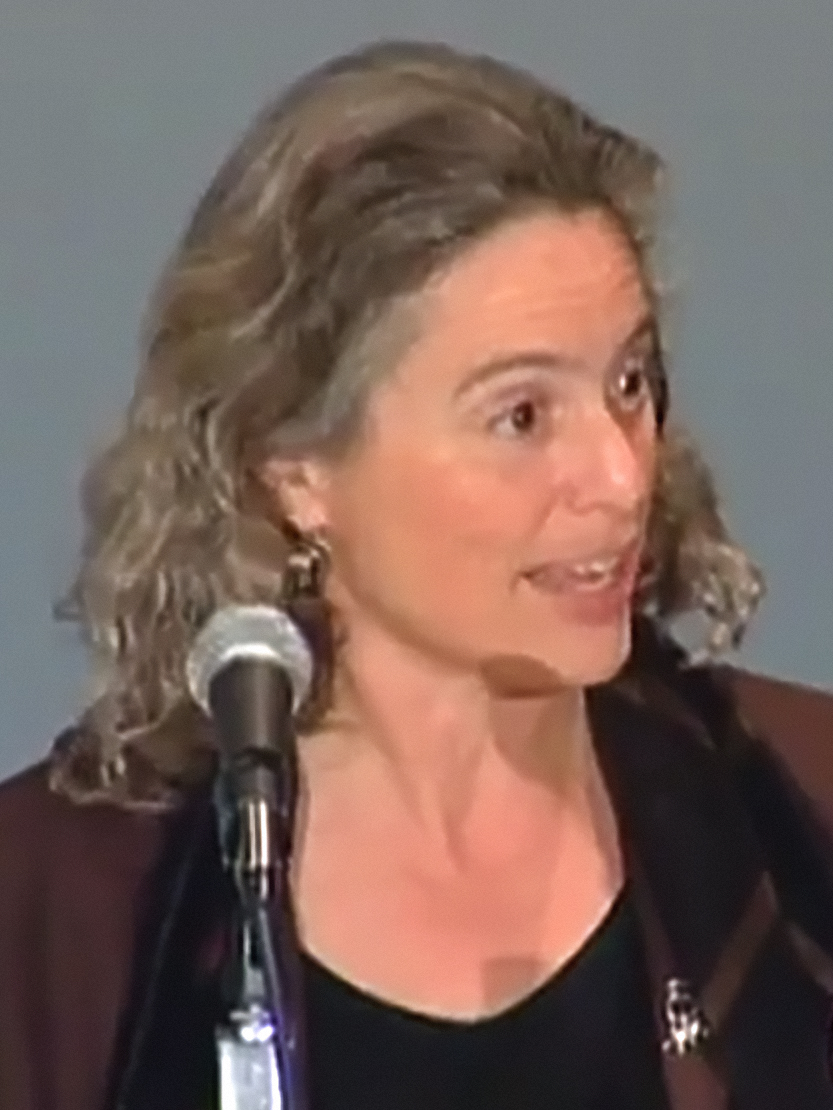
- Milkman at the Center for the Study of Los Angeles at Loyola Marymount University, February 2006
- Born: December 18, 1954 (age 71)
- Occupations: Scholar, Professor
- Title: Distinguished Professor

Academic background
- Education: Ph.D.
- Alma mater: University of California, Berkeley
- Thesis: The Reproduction of Job Segregation by Sex: A Study of the Changing Sexual Division of Labor in the Auto and Electrical Manufacturing Industries in the 1940s (1981)
- Doctoral advisor: Michael Burawoy,
- Other advisors: David Brody, Michael Paul Rogin

Academic work
- Discipline: Sociologist
- Sub-discipline: Labor, Women's Studies, Immigration, Social Movements
- Institutions: Graduate Center, CUNY, University of California, Los Angeles
- Website: http://www.ruthmilkman.info/

Ruth Milkman (born December 18, 1954) is an American sociologist of labor and labor movements. She is Distinguished Professor of Sociology at the CUNY Graduate Center and the director of research at CUNY School of Labor and Urban Studies. Between 1988 and 2009 Milkman taught at the University of California, Los Angeles, where she directed the UCLA Institute for Research on Labor and Employment.

== Education and career ==
Milkman's grandparents emigrated to the United States around 1910, and the family's last name was allegedly bestowed on them by an immigration official at Ellis Island. (In reality, the family itself must have initiated the name change, since Ellis Island officials never changed names.) While both of Milkman's parents were born and raised in Brooklyn, and eventually attended Brooklyn College, Milkman was raised in Annapolis, Maryland where her father was an instructor at the United States Naval Academy. Milkman attributes her interest in labor to an incident in her childhood, where, when shopping with her mother in New York City, the two encountered an International Ladies' Garment Workers' Union picket line, which her mother refused to cross. Milkman obtained a bachelor's degree in 1975 from Brown University, where created her own major with an emphasis in women's studies. She was awarded a Master of Arts in sociology in 1977 and a Ph.D. in sociology in 1981, both from the University of California, Berkeley. Milkman was drawn to Berkeley because of the left-wing political activity of the 1960s that had taken place there. While at Berkeley, Milkman was an editor of Socialist Review, which later became Radical Society.

In 1981, Milkman was appointed an assistant professor, then associate professor, of sociology at Queens College and the CUNY Graduate Center in New York City. In 1986, she was a visiting lecturer in American labor history at the University of Warwick in Coventry, United Kingdom, a visiting professor at the University of São Paulo in São Paulo, Brazil in 1990, a visiting research scholar at Macquarie University in Sydney, Australia in 1991, and a visiting research associate at the Centre National de la Recherche Scientifique in Paris in 1993. She won an appointment as an associate professor at University of California, Los Angeles in 1988, where she became a full professor of sociology.

She was appointed director of the UCLA Institute of Industrial Relations in 2001. From 2001 to 2004, Milkman also was director of the University of California Institute for Labor and Employment prior to its restructuring as a research fund. In 2009, Milkman returned to the CUNY Graduate Center, and took up her present position of Research Director at the Joseph S. Murphy Institute for Worker Education and Labor Studies.

== Research ==
Milkman's research focus is on the sociology of work. She has a strong interest in the American labor movement and labor history. She has also published extensively on low-wage workers and the sociology of gender in the U.S. Milkman writes from a "new labor history" perspective.

One of Milkman's earliest published works, Women, Work and Protest: A Century of U.S. Women's Labor History, was widely praised for its cross-disciplinary focus and for highlighting the important role women played in the American labor movement. The book was cited for being "rich in the variety of detailed case material offered in exploring the experiences of women employed in many occupations and industries around the country. Also included are two excellent chapters on the role of on women's auxiliaries in strike initiatives of male unions." It is now considered a "classic work" in the field of labor studies. Her second major work, Farewell to the Factory: Autoworkers in the Late Twentieth Century, questioned the common assumption that technological changes are almost always negative for skilled and unskilled blue-collar workers, and was well-reviewed within the industrial relations and labor history academic communities.

In 2004, Milkman co-edited Rebuilding Labor: Organizing and Organizers in the New Union Movement with Kim Voss. The book was highly influential within the American labor movement for its empirical nature and focus. As one reviewer noted, "Rebuilding Labor breaks new ground in providing rich empirical material and careful analysis for understanding the dynamics of contemporary labor organizing. The book as a whole is a very persuasive demonstration of the crucial value of systematic empirical research for the labor movement." Labor union activists pointed to the chapters by Bronfenbrenner and Hickey, DiNardo and Lee, Sharpe, Penney and Lopez as important in improving organizing practices. The chapter by Daisy Rooks on the nature and culture of organizing work has also generated much discussion.

In 2006, Milkman released L.A. Story, a case study of four organizing campaigns in Los Angeles, California, which drew some remarkable conclusions. First, Milkman argues that emergence of relatively innovative unions such as the Service Employees International Union (SEIU), UNITE HERE and the United Food and Commercial Workers from the conservative AFL-CIO is as noteworthy as the creation of the Congress of Industrial Organizations in 1935. Second, Milkman's analysis of four SEIU Los Angeles-area organizing campaigns concludes that the most effective organizing strategy is a top-down one. Milkman doesn't discount extensive worker involvement, but argues that it is less important than other studies have found. Third, Milkman argues that the primary factor in the failure of union organizing campaigns is lack of resources (money and staff) rather than employer opposition, legal factors or the failure to use or improper implementation of good organizing tactics.

L.A. Story elicited debate in the academic community and labor movement for two reasons. First, Milkman's conclusion about the top-down nature of effective union organizing flies in the face of the "new labor history", which argues that workers should not only be the focus of academic research but in fact are the most important facet of the labor movement. In some ways, Milkman's conclusions are reminiscent of the institutionalist and Hegelian historicist perspective of older labor theorists such as Selig Perlman, Philip Taft and John R. Commons. Milkman's findings also contradict to a significant degree the conclusions of other scholars such as Bronfenbrenner and Juravich, who find that greater levels of worker involvement in union organizing can be equated with a higher degree of union success. For labor activists, Milkman's book is controversial because it seems to suggest that union democracy is not an important factor in either union organizing success or in the revitalization of the labor movement.

Milkman co-authored a 2009 study of low-wage workers in New York City, Los Angeles, and Chicago which found that these laborers are routinely denied overtime pay and often illegally paid less than the minimum wage.

== Memberships and awards ==
Milkman has received a number of honors in her career.

She has served on the editorial board for a number of scholarly journals, including Feminist Studies, Politics and Society, the American Journal of Sociology, Gender and Society, International Labor and Working-Class History, Contemporary Sociology, the British Journal of Industrial Relations, Industrial Relations and Work and Occupations.

Her book, Gender at Work: The Dynamics of Job Segregation by Sex during World War II, won the 1987 Joan Kelly Memorial Prize in Women's History from the American Historical Association (AHA). The Joan Kelly Memorial Prize draws more submissions than most other AHA competitions, with an estimated 45 to 70 books competing in any given year.

== Published works ==
=== Solely authored books ===
- Immigrant Labor and the New Precariat. New York: Polity, 2020. ISBN 978-0-745-69201-2
- L.A Story: Immigrant Workers and the Future of the U.S. Labor Movement. New York: Russell Sage Foundation, 2006. ISBN 978-0-87154-635-7
- Farewell to the Factory: Autoworkers in the Late Twentieth Century. Berkeley, California: University of California Press, 1997. ISBN 978-0-520-20677-9
- Gender at Work: The Dynamics of Job Segregation by Sex During World War II. Champaign, Ill.: University of Illinois Press, 1987. ISBN 978-0-252-01352-2

=== Solely edited books ===
- Organizing Immigrants: The Challenge for Unions in Contemporary California. Ithaca, New York: Cornell University Press, 2000. ISBN 978-0-8014-3697-0
- Women, Work and Protest: A Century of U.S. Women's Labor History. Boston: Taylor and Francis, 1985. ISBN 978-0-415-06592-4

=== Co-edited books ===
- Milkman, Ruth and Voss, Kim, eds. Rebuilding Labor: Organizing and Organizers in the New Union Movement. Ithaca, New York: Cornell University Press, 2004. ISBN 978-0-8014-4265-0
- Milkman, Ruth; Bloom, Joshua and Narro, Victor, eds. Working for Justice: The L.A. Model of Organizing and Advocacy. Ithaca, New York: ILR Press, 2010. ISBN 978-0-8014-7580-1

=== Solely authored book chapters ===
- "American Women and Industrial Unionism During World War II." In Behind the Lines: Gender and the Two World Wars. Margaret Randolph Higonnet, Jane Jenson, Sonya Michel and Margaret C. Weitz, eds. New Haven: Yale University Press, 1987. ISBN 978-0-300-03687-9
- "Gender and Trade Unionism in Historical Perspective." In Women, Politics, and Change. Patricia Gurin and Louise Tilly, eds. New York: Russell Sage Foundation, 1990. ISBN 978-0-87154-884-9
- "Immigrant Organizing and the New Labor Movement in Los Angeles." In Unions in a Globalized Environment. Bruce Nissen, ed. Armonk, New York: M.E. Sharpe, 2002. ISBN 978-0-7656-0869-7
- "Labor and Management in Uncertain Times: Renegotiating the Social Contract." In America at Century's End. Alan Wolfe, ed. Berkeley, Calif.: University of California Press, 1991. ISBN 978-0-520-07476-7
- "The New American Workplace: High Road or Low Road." In Workplaces of the Future. Paul Thompson and Chris Warhurst, eds. London: Macmillan, 1998. ISBN 978-0-333-72800-0
- "The New Deal, the CIO, and Women in Industry." In The New Deal 50 Years After: A Historical Assessment. Wilbur J. Cohen, ed. Austin, Tex.: LBJ School of Public Affairs, 1986. ISBN 978-0-89940-415-8
- "Organizing Immigrant Women in New York's Chinatown." In Women and Unions: Forging a New Partnership. Dorothy S. Cobble, ed. Ithaca, New York: ILR Press, 1993. ISBN 978-0-87546-300-1
- "Rosie the Riveter Revisited: Management's Postwar Purge of Women Auto Workers." In On the Line: Essays in the History of Auto Work. Nelson Lichtenstein and Stephen Meyer, eds. Champaign, Ill.: University of Illinois Press, 1989. ISBN 978-0-252-01539-7
- "Union Responses to Workforce Feminization in the United States." In The Challenge of Restructuring: North American Labor Movements Respond. Jane Jenson and Rianne Mahon, eds. Philadelphia: Temple University Press, 1993. ISBN 978-0-87722-981-0
- "Women Workers and the Labor Movement in Hard Times: Comparing the 1930s with the 1970s and 1980s." In Women, Households and the Economy. Lourdes Beneria and Katherine Stimpson, eds. New Brunswick, N.J.: Rutgers University Press, 1988. ISBN 978-0-8135-1263-1
- "Women Workers, Feminism, and the Labor Movement Since the 1960s." In Women, Work and Protest: A Century of U.S. Women's Labor History. Ruth Milkman, ed. Boston: Taylor and Francis, 1985. ISBN 978-0-415-06592-4

=== Co-authored book chapters ===
- Milkman, Ruth and Wong, Kent. "Organizing Immigrant Workers: Case Studies from Southern California." In Rekindling the Movement: Labor’s Quest for 21st Century Relevance. Lowell Turner, Harry Katz and Richard Hurd, eds. Ithaca, New York: ILR Press, 2001. ISBN 978-0-8014-3874-5
- Milkman, Ruth and Wong, Kent. "Organizing the Wicked City: The 1992 Southern California Drywall Strike." In Organizing Immigrants: The Challenge for Unions in Contemporary California. Ruth Milkman, ed. Ithaca, New York: ILR Press, 2000. ISBN 978-0-8014-3697-0
- Waldinger, Roger; Erickson, Chris; Milkman, Ruth; Mitchell, Daniel J.B.; Valenzuela, Abel; Wong, Kent; and Zeitlin, Maurice. "Helots No More: A Case Study of the Justice for Janitors Campaign in Los Angeles." In Organizing to Win. Kate Bronfenbrenner, Sheldon Friedman, Richard Hurd, Rudolph A. Oswald and Ronald L. Seeber, eds. Ithaca, New York: ILR Press, 1997. ISBN 978-0-8014-8446-9

=== Solely authored articles ===
- "The Anti-Concessions Movement in the UAW." Socialist Review. 65 (1982).
- "Divided We Stand." New Labor Forum. 15:1 (2006).
- "Female Factory Labor and Industrial Structure: Control and Conflict over Woman's Place in Auto and Electrical Manufacturing." Politics & Society. 12:2 (1982).
- "Linking Research and Advocacy: The Case of Paid Family Leave." Contexts. 5:1 (2006).
- "The New Labor Movement: Possibilities and Limits." Contemporary Sociology. 27:2 (March 1997).
- "New Research in Women's Labor History." Signs: Journal of Women in Culture and Society. 18:2 (Winter 1993).
- "Organizing the Sexual Division of Labor: Historical Perspectives on Women's Work and the American Labor Movement." Socialist Review. 49 (1980).
- "Redefining Women's Work: The Sexual Division of Labor in the Auto Industry During World War II." Feminist Studies. 8:2 (Summer 1981).
- "Win or Lose: Lessons from Two Contrasting Union Campaigns." Social Policy. 35:2 (2004/2005).
- "Women's History and the Sears Case." Feminist Studies. 12:2 (1986).
- "Women's Work and Economic Crisis: Some Lessons of the Great Depression." Review of Radical Political Economics. 8:1 (Spring 1976).

=== Co-authored articles ===
- Erickson, Christopher; Fisk, Catherine; Milkman, Ruth; Mitchell, Daniel J.B.; and Wong, Kent. "Justice for Janitors in Los Angeles: Lessons from Three Rounds of Negotiations." British Journal of Industrial Relations. 40:3 (September 2002)
- Milkman, Ruth and Pullman, Cydney. "Technological Change in an Auto Assembly Plant: The Impact on Workers' Tasks and Skills." Work and Occupations. 18:2 (May 1991).
- Milkman, Ruth; Reese, Ellen; and Roth, Benita. "The Macrosociology of Paid Domestic Labor." Work and Occupations. 25:4 (November 1998).
- Milkman, Ruth and Voss, Kim. "New Unity for Labor?" Labor: Studies in Working-Class History of the Americas. 2:1 (2005).
