= CUNY School of Labor and Urban Studies =

School in the City University of New York system

The CUNY School of Labor and Urban Studies
- Former names: The Joseph S. Murphy Institute
- Type: Public university
- Established: 2018
- Founders: Gregory Mantsios
- Parent institution: City University of New York
- Dean: Gregory Mantsios
- Location: 25 West 43rd Street, 19th Floor, Manhattan, New York, NY, 10036, USA; 40.754894°N 73.981856°W
- Campus: Urban
- Website: slu.cuny.edu

The CUNY School of Labor and Urban Studies (also known as CUNY SLU) is a public undergraduate, graduate, and professional school in New York City associated with the City University of New York system. Founded in 2018 as an outgrowth of the Joseph S. Murphy Institute for Worker Education and Labor Studies, the Murphy Institute is now one of incorporated programs at the School of Labor and Urban Studies, which provides undergraduate and graduate degrees in Labor Studies and Urban Studies, as well as certificate programs and workforce development for members of labor unions. It publishes the journal New Labor Forum.

== History ==
The CUNY School of Labor and Urban Studies was established in 2018 as an outgrowth of the Joseph S. Murphy Institute for Worker Education and Labor Studies, otherwise known as The Murphy Institute. The Murphy Institute was first established in 1984 at Queens College in collaboration with three New York City labor unions for the purposes of providing worker education to labor union members. In 2005, the Murphy Institute was incorporated into the CUNY School of Professional Studies, expanding to provide undergraduate and graduate degrees.

Though New York labor unions had been petitioning for the Murphy Institute to become its own stand-alone school since 2012, when the New York State AFL–CIO passed a resolution endorsing the proposal, it was only until Governor Andrew Cuomo added $1.5 million to the state budget in 2018 that funding was available.

== Faculty ==
Among the faculty include:

- Mimi Abramovitz
- Steven Attewell
- Kafui Attoh
- Juan Battle
- Deepak Bhargava
- Stephen Brier
- Ellen Dichner
- Francis Fox Piven
- Joshua Freeman
- Stephanie Luce
- Ruth Milkman
- John Mollenkopf
- James Steele
