= Deepak Bhargava =

Indian-American immigration activist

- Born: 1968 (age 57–58); Bangalore, India
- Education: Harvard University (BA)
- Partner: Harry Hanbury

Deepak Bhargava is an immigration reform advocate and until 2018 was the executive director of the nonprofit Center for Community Change in Washington, D.C.

== Early life ==
Bhargava was born in Bangalore, India. His family emigrated to the New York City borough, The Bronx, where he grew up and became, in his words, a "ferocious Yankees fan." He attended Harvard College, where he opposed Reserve Officers Training Corps presence, and graduated summa cum laude in 1990.

== Advocacy career ==
Deepak Bhargava: It's time for a new paradigm in the poverty debate

Bhargava began his career at ACORN, where he served as legislative director and spokesperson.

He joined the Center for Community Change in 1994 as the director of public policy. In 2000, he directed the National Campaign for Jobs and Income Support coalition of grassroots groups working on federal welfare law. Bhargava became executive director of the Center for Community Change in 2002.

Much of Bhargava's work at CCC has focused on immigration reform. He brought together immigration activists and helped launch the Fair Immigration Reform Movement, was arrested outside of the White House while protesting immigration law in 2011, and was credited for having convinced President Barack Obama to reduce deportation of undocumented immigrants in 2012.

In 2019, Bhargava joined the CUNY School of Labor and Urban Studies as a Distinguished Lecturer of Urban Studies.

Bhargava has served on the boards of:

- Center for Law and Social Policy
- Discount Foundation
- Open Society Foundations
- League of Education Voters
- Bauman Foundation
- National Immigration Forum Action Fund

In 2024, Bhargava left the Center for Community Change and became the president of Freedom Together Foundation (formerly JBP Foundation)
