= Immanuel Ness =

American academic (born 1958)

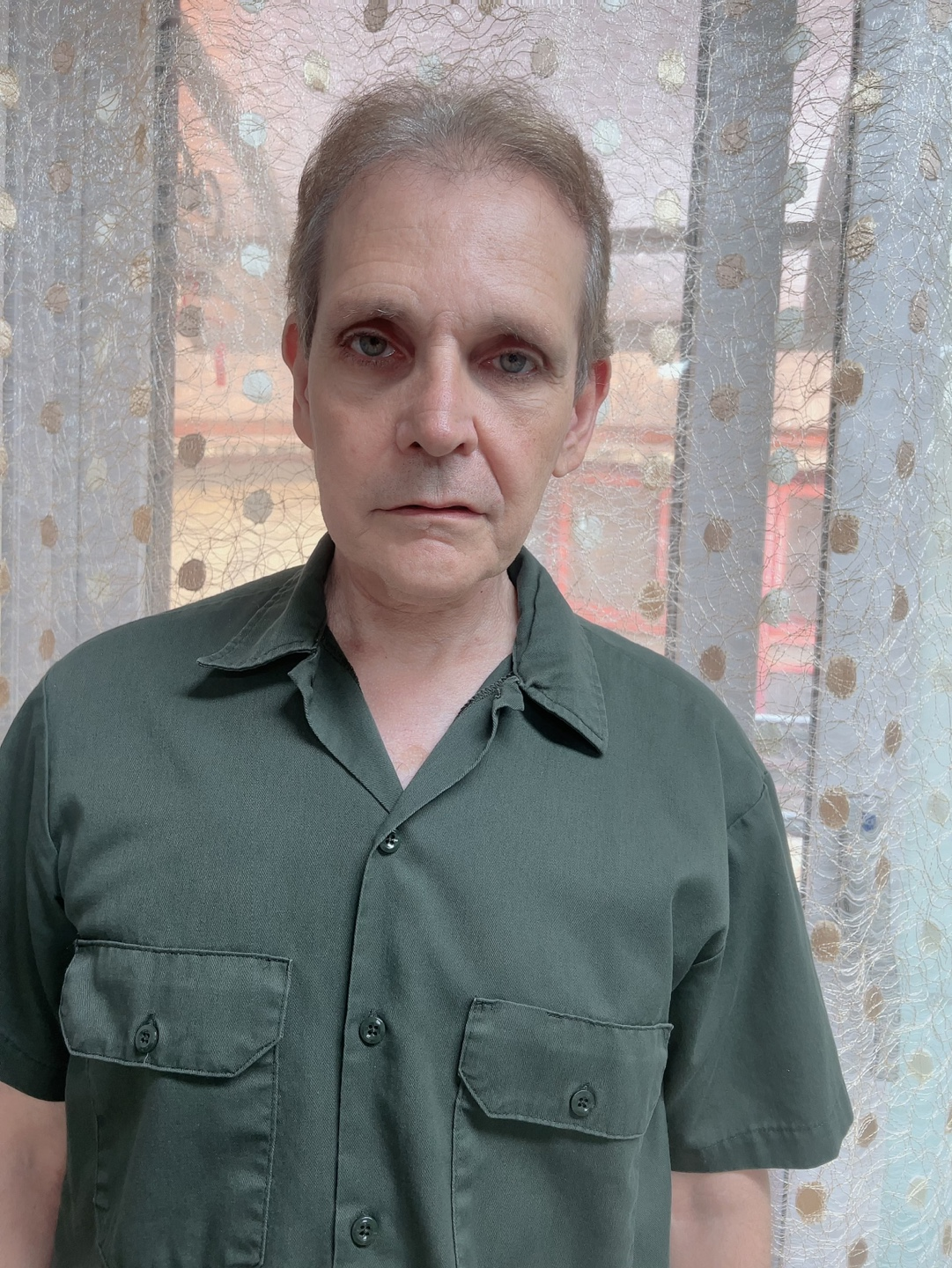
- Immanuel Ness in Kuala Lumpur
- Born: 17 June 1958 (age 68); Denver, Colorado, U.S.

Academic background
- Education: New York University (BA); Columbia University (MA); City University of New York (PhD)
- Thesis: Trade Unions and the Unemployed: Organizing Strategies, Conflict, and Control (1995)

Academic work
- Institutions: City University of New York; University of Johannesburg
- Main interests: Political economy Labour and work organization Migration; Imperialism
- Notable works: Southern Insurgency: The Coming of the Global Working Class; Migration as Economic Imperialism

Immanuel Ness (born June 17, 1958) is an American political scientist and activist who teaches at City University of New York's Brooklyn College. His academic focus is on workers' organization, migration, mobilization and politics. He is also a labour activist.

Ness is known for his contributions regarding worker's movements and party formation in the Global South, and has worked with leading activists in India, Southern Africa, East and Southeast Asia. In 1990, he founded the New York Unemployed Committee. He is author and editor of numerous articles and academic and popular books on labour, worker insurgencies and trade unions. Most notably, he worked with Mexican workers, unions, and community organizations in New York City to establish a code of conduct for migrant laborers in 2001 who were paid below minimum wage.

== Education and career ==
According to his faculty profile, Ness graduated with a BA in politics and history from New York University in 1981 and received a certificate in African studies (equivalent to an MA degree) from Columbia University's department of political science in 1986. According to another source, he received his BA from Swarthmore College in 1980 and his MA from the Massachusetts Institute of Technology in 1995.
City University of New York (PhD) He completed his PhD thesis on Trade Unions and the Unemployed: Organizing Strategies, Conflict, and Control at the City University of New York in 1995.

He is a professor of political science at Brooklyn College, City University of New York. He also holds the position of a senior research associate at the Department of Sociology of the University of Johannesburg, where he was previously a visiting professor in 2022.

== Academic work ==
Ness's research primarily concerns the situation and politics of the international working class and, more generally, "the global poor", low-wage migrant labour or contractual and informal workers, mainly in the Global South.

Ness is the editor-in-chief of the Journal of Labor and Society (JLSO), a quarterly peer-reviewed social science publication founded in 1997, and serves as the series editor for Brill's Studies in Political Economy of Global Labor and Work.

Among the numerous volumes Ness has edited, the four-volume Encyclopedia of American Social Movements (Routledge) was selected by the American Library Association as a Best Reference Source. The Encyclopedia of Global Human Migration (Wiley-Blackwell, 2013), is a 5-volume examination of human mobility from prehistory to the present. Ours to Master and to Own: Workers Councils from the Commune to the Present (Haymarket Books 2011; Neuer ISP Verlag 2013) covers 22 case histories of factory occupations and workers' councils over the past 150 years.

His publications have appeared in English, Spanish, German, Italian, French, Turkish, Chinese, and Japanese.

== Political engagement ==
Ness was a trade union organizer in the U.S. and labour activist in the Global South from 1989 to 2021. During this period, he learned to advocate on behalf of disconnected jobless workers to organize their own association directly at New York State unemployed offices. In 1990, he co-founded the New York Unemployed Committee (1990–1993), which successfully organized jobless workers at New York State unemployment centers to press for federal unemployment benefit extensions through public protests and demonstrations directed at national and state elected officials, in many cases, often members of the Democratic Party who had surrendered to Republicans during the presidency of George H.W. Bush. Rallies were held in New York City, and with other jobless organizations in Washington, DC, and Kennebunkport, Maine in August 1991.

Ness' work is rooted in understanding production and manufacturing as essential to understanding the labour movement and capitalism. Fordism is viewed as an exceptional period which is not the norm; rather the dispersal of industry has pushed the development of contractors and dispersed work sites. In this way, in 1998, he co-founded the Lower East Side Community Labor Coalition in New York City with members of progressive and leftist local groups, which mobilized low-wage workers with support of UNITE Local 169, a labor union in the neighborhood that was previously affiliated with the Amalgamated Clothing and Textile Workers Union. The campaign expanded into a successful effort to mobilise Mexican and Latino immigrant workers along with Mexican workers and the Mexican American Workers Association (AMAT), a workers' center in New York. He helped organise large Mayday demonstrations in New York City, centered around authentic-worker led mobilizations for immigrant rights from 1999 to 2001, often culminating in mass arrests of street theatre and protests by New York City police, setting a precedent of immigrant leadership and participation in the US organization of the annual worldwide labour holiday.

In 2013, Ness was a member of an eight-member delegation of the International Commission for Labor Rights investigation of worker repression in India's auto industry.

Ness has been a consistent advocate for opening admission to colleges and universities and lowering tuition and fees at City University of New York (CUNY). Following appointment as visiting professor at the University of Hyderabad in January 2016, Ness refused the academic position upon his arrival and actively joined a student strike, mass pickets, and demonstrations at an outdoor encampment to protest structural discrimination against Dalit students that was the cause of the suicide of Rohit Vemula, a graduate student. His refusal to serve as a visiting professor gained national attention in India. Yet Ness maintained,

“In India, the major contradiction and division is the difference between permanent and contract, and it plays itself out in furthering the super exploitation of the labour force of this country.”

Ness was elected chair of the Professional Staff Congress City University of New York (PSC/CUNY) International Committee in September 2016 and has been chair of the United States Peace Council in May 2018, advocating for working-class solidarity and against war and imperialism. In May 2021, as PS International Committee Chair, Ness sponsored the passage of a ‘No Cold War with China Resolution, now official policy of Professional Staff Congress, the faculty and staff union of City University of New York. In addition, Ness, helped shepherd a resolution condemning Israel for its intolerance and violence towards Palestinians.

=== Theoretical approach to labor organizing ===
In 1990s, his research became more critical of traditional unions, and he began to participate in advancing rank-and-file self-activity outside of traditional structures through new forms of autonomist Marxist unions. His advocacy included solidarity efforts with new and independent unions that had few or limited links to trade union centers and affiliates. Much of his organizing, advocacy, and research since 2015 has focused on a rejection of utopian and idealist notions propounded by social democrats, anarchists, Western Marxists, and through applying an anti-imperialist state-centered Marxist approach rooted in unequal exchange between the rich countries of the Global North and poor countries of the Global South, which comprise 85% of the world's population. Ness is formulating a reconceptualization of the centrality of the working class as a social force in building disciplined workers parties, accountable to mass workers and actually existing socialist states (AES).

== Bibliography ==
=== As author ===
- Trade Unions and the Betrayal of the Unemployed: Labor Conflicts during the 1990s (Garland Publishing, 1998)
- Encyclopedia of Interest Groups and Lobbyists in the United States (M.E. Sharpe, 2000)
- Immigrants, Unions and the New U.S. Labor Market (Temple University Press, 2005)
- Guest Workers and U.S. Corporate Despotism (University of Illinois Press, 2011)
- Southern Insurgency: The Coming of the Global Working Class (Pluto Press, 2015)
- Organizing Insurgency: Workers Movements in the Global South (Pluto Press, 2021)
- Migration as Economic Imperialism: How International Labour Mobility Undermines Economic Development in Poor Countries (Polity, 2023)
- Dialectics of Chinese Labor: Trade Unions under Market Socialism (Brill, 2026)

=== As editor ===
- Encyclopedia of Global Population and Demographics, with James Ciment (Routledge, 1999)
- Encyclopedia of American Social Movements (Sharpe Reference, 2004)
- Race and Labor Matters in the New U.S. Economy, with Manning Marable and Joseph Wilson (Rowman & Littlefield, 2006)
- The Encyclopedia of Strikes in American History, with Aaron Brenner and Benjamin Day (M.E. Sharpe, 2009)
- The International Encyclopedia of Revolution and Protest: 1500 to the Present (8 vols., Wiley-Blackwell, 2009)
- Ours to Master and to Own: Workers Councils from the Commune to the Present (Haymarket Books 2011; Nuerer ISP Verlag 2011)
- The Encyclopedia of Global Human Migration (5 vols., Wiley-Blackwell, 2013)
- New Forms of Worker Organization: The Syndicalist and Autonomist Restoration of Class-Struggle Unionism (PM Press, 2014)
- Central Labor Councils and the Revivals of American Unionism: Organizing for Justice in Our Communities, with Stuart Eimer (Routledge, 2015)
- The New Urban Immigrant Workforce: Innovative Models for Labor Organizing, with Sarumathi Jayaraman (Routledge, 2015)
- The Palgrave Encyclopedia of Imperialism and Anti-Imperialism, with Zak Cope (Palgrave Macmillan, 2016; 2nd edn. 2021)
- Urban Revolt: State Power and the Rise of People's Movements in the Global South, with Trevor Ngwane and Luke Sinwell (Haymarket Books, 2017)
- Global Perspectives on Workers' and Labour Organizations, with Maurizio Atzeni (Springer, 2018)
- Choke Points: Logistics Workers Disrupting the Global Supply Chain, with Jake Alimahomed-Wilson (Pluto Press, 2018)
- The Oxford Handbook of Migration Crises, with Cecilia Menjívar and Marie Ruiz (Oxford University Press, 2019)
- Sanctions as War: Anti-Imperialist Perspectives on American Geo-Economic Strategy, with Stuart Davis (Brill Publishers, 2022)
- The Oxford Handbook of Economic Imperialism, with Zak Cope (Oxford University Press, 2022)
- Platform Labour and Global Logistics: A Research Companion (Routledge, 2022)
- The Routledge Handbook of the Gig Economy (Routledge, 2023)
- Global Rupture: Neoliberal Capitalism and the Rise of Informal Labour in the Global South, with Anita Hammer (Brill, 2023)
