= Deborah E. McDowell =

American journalist (born 1951)

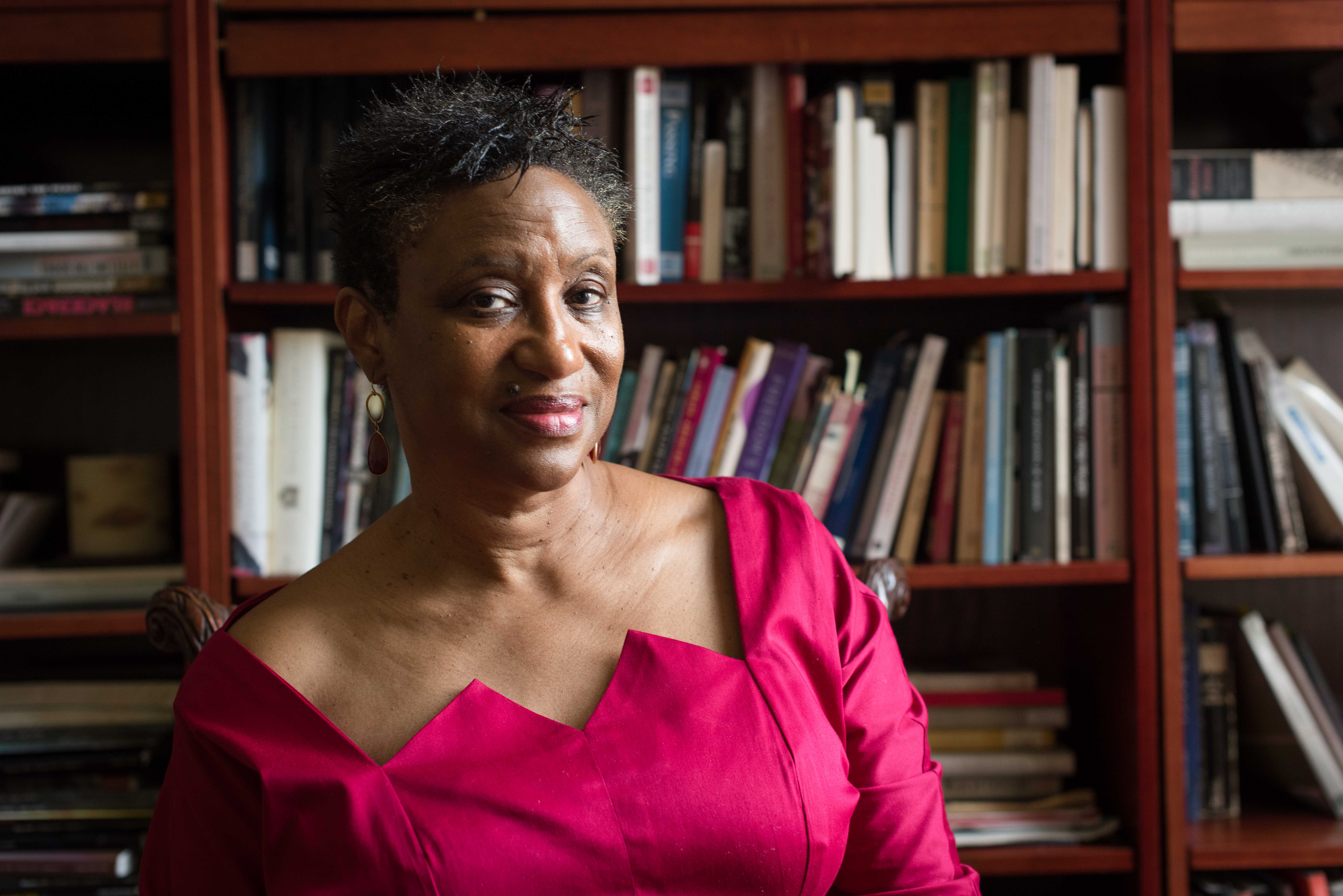
- Born: 1951 (age 74–75); Bessemer, Alabama, US
- Awards: Honorary Doctorate, Purdue University, Helen Homans Gilbert Prize Lectureship, Harvard University, Zintl Leadership Award

Academic background
- Education: Tuskegee University (B.A.); Purdue University (M.A. and Ph.D.)
- Thesis: "Women on Women: The Black Woman Writer of the Harlem Renaissance--Jessie Fauset, Nella Larsen, Zora Neale Hurston"

Academic work
- Institutions: University of Virginia, Carter G. Woodson Institute of African-American and African Studies
- Main interests: African-American Literature and Culture, Women's Literature

Deborah E. McDowell (born 1951) is a scholar, author and member of the University of Virginia faculty since 1987 where she serves as the Alice Griffin professor of Literary Studies. In 2008 professor McDowell was named director of the Carter G. Woodson Institute for African-American and African Studies, at the University of Virginia.

== Early life ==
McDowell was born and raised in Bessemer, Alabama. She wrote about her childhood in her debut memoir Leaving Pipe Shop: Memories of Kin.

== Academic and writing career ==
McDowell received a B.A. degree from Tuskegee University, and M.A. and Ph.D. from Purdue University. She has been on the faculty of the University of Virginia since 1987. She founded the African-American Women Writers Series at Beacon Press, and was its editor from 1985 to 1993. McDowell was featured in the documentary Unearthed and Understood.

In 2018, she was awarded the Zintl Leadership Award by the Maxine Platzer Lynn Women's Center.

== Publications ==
- (ed. with Arnold Rampersad) Slavery and the Literary Imagination (Selected Papers from the English Institute) (1989)
- (ed.) Plum Bun: A Novel Without A Moral (Black Women Writers Series), by Jessie Redmon Fauset (1990)
- (ed.) Four Girls at Cottage City, by Emma Dunham Kelley-Hawkins (The Schomburg Library of Nineteenth-Century Black Women Writers) (1991)
- The Changing Same: Black Women's Literature, Criticism, and Theory (1994)
- Leaving Pipe Shop: Memories of Kin, Simon & Schuster/Scribners (1997), ISBN 0-684-81449-8
- (ed.) Narrative of the Life of Frederick Douglass, by Frederick Douglass. Oxford World's Classics (1999)
- (ed. with Claudrena N. Harold and Juan Battle) The Punitive Turn: New Approaches to Race and Incarceration (Carter G. Woodson Institute Series) (2013)
