= The Dance of Dragons =

- Game of Thrones episode
- Episode no.: Season 5 Episode 9
- Directed by: David Nutter
- Written by: David Benioff; D. B. Weiss
- Cinematography by: Robert McLachlan
- Editing by: Katie Weiland
- Original air date: June 7, 2015
- Running time: 52 minutes

Guest appearances
- Owen Teale as Ser Alliser Thorne; Tara Fitzgerald as Selyse Baratheon; Mark Gatiss as Tycho Nestoris; Alexander Siddig as Doran Martell; DeObia Oparei as Areo Hotah; Joel Fry as Hizdahr zo Loraq; Ian Beattie as Ser Meryn Trant; Roger Ashton-Griffiths as Mace Tyrell; Ben Crompton as Edd Tollett; Keisha Castle-Hughes as Obara Sand; Rosabell Laurenti Sellers as Tyene Sand; Jessica Henwick as Nymeria Sand; Nell Tiger Free as Myrcella Baratheon; Toby Sebastian as Trystane Martell; Kerry Ingram as Shireen Baratheon; Brenock O'Connor as Olly; Ian Whyte as Wun Wun; Brian Fortune as Othell Yarwyck; Michael Condron as Bowen Marsh

Episode chronology
← Previous "Hardhome"	Next → "Mother's Mercy"
- Game of Thrones season 5

"The Dance of Dragons" is the ninth and penultimate episode of the fifth season of HBO's medieval fantasy television series Game of Thrones. The 49th episode overall, "The Dance of Dragons" was written by the series' creators David Benioff and D. B. Weiss based on material primarily found on George R. R. Martin's novel A Dance with Dragons, from which the title of the episode is derived. It was directed by David Nutter, who also directed the season finale.

In the episode, Jon Snow allows the surviving wildlings to pass through the Wall at Castle Black. Stannis Baratheon allows Melisandre to sacrifice his daughter, Shireen Baratheon, to the Lord of Light. Arya Stark seeks personal revenge in Braavos. Jaime Lannister strikes a deal with Prince Doran Martell of Dorne to allow Myrcella Baratheon to return home. In Meereen, Daenerys Targaryen is ambushed in a surprise attack by the Sons of the Harpy during a tournament in the fighting pits, eventually escaping with Drogon. "The Dance of Dragons" received a positive response from critics, who mainly lauded its action-packed conclusion on Daznak's Pit, but was polarized by the characterization of Stannis Baratheon.

In the United States, it received a viewership of 7.14 million in its initial broadcast. It won two Primetime Creative Arts Emmy Awards for Outstanding Single-Camera Picture Editing for a Drama Series and Outstanding Special Visual Effects, and was submitted by actress Emilia Clarke (who portrayed Daenerys Targaryen) to support her nomination for a Primetime Emmy Award for Outstanding Supporting Actress in a Drama Series.

This episode marks the final appearances of Joel Fry (Hizdahr Zo Loraq) and Kerry Ingram (Shireen Baratheon).

== Plot ==
=== At the Wall ===
Jon retreats from Hardhome to the Wall defeated, accompanied by the surviving wildlings. Much to the chagrin of some of the Night's Watch, Jon allows them to pass through the gates and come south of the Wall.

=== In the North ===
Caught in a snowstorm, Stannis's army is low on morale and supplies after Ramsay Bolton sabotages his resources in the night. Stannis commands Davos to return to Castle Black and ask Jon for supplies and manpower, promising to return the favor when he takes the Iron Throne. After Davos leaves, Stannis reluctantly allows Melisandre to sacrifice his daughter, Shireen, to the Lord of Light for the prospect of better weather, so his army can continue their march to Winterfell.

=== In Dorne ===
Jaime secures Myrcella Baratheon's release from Doran Martell's court against an indignant Ellaria Sand. Bronn is also released from captivity by Prince Trystane.

=== In Braavos ===
Arya Stark detours from her mission given by Jaqen H'ghar to reconnoiter Meryn Trant instead.

=== In Meereen ===
In the fighting pits, Daenerys Targaryen attends a tournament. To her surprise, Jorah is competing, and he wins. As he does, the Sons of the Harpy attack the stadium of Daznak's Pit in an attempt to assassinate Daenerys, who is rescued by Jorah and her largest dragon, Drogon. Leaving Tyrion Lannister and her retainers behind with awe, Daenerys rides the dragon for the first time and flees the city.

== Production ==
=== Writing ===
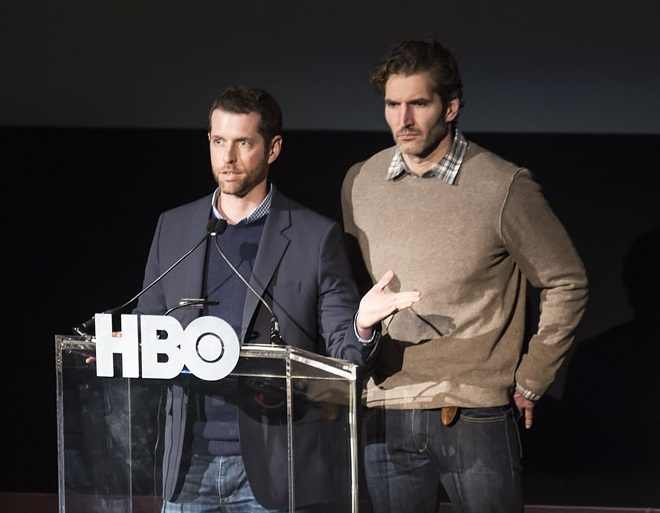
The episode was written by series co-creators David Benioff and D. B. Weiss.

This episode was adapted for television by series co-creators and showrunners David Benioff and D. B. Weiss. It contains content from George R. R. Martin's novel A Dance with Dragons, chapters "The Sacrifice", "The Watcher", and "Daenerys IX". It also contains material from the preview chapter "Mercy" from the forthcoming The Winds of Winter.

Like other episodes this season, "The Dance of Dragons" contains original content not found in Martin's novels. This episode features the first instance of containing content that will appear in future, forthcoming novels. Martin confirmed to Benioff and Weiss Shireen would be burned to death as a sacrifice in an unpublished future novel. Benioff said: "When George first told us about this, it was one of those moments where I remember looking at Dan, it was just, like, god it's so, so horrible, and it's so good in a story sense, because it all comes together." Weiss says he believes the decision to kill Shireen in this way is, "entirely [narratively] justified," questioning why "we're all highly selective about which characters deserve our empathy. Stannis has been burning people alive for seemingly trivial reasons since season 2."

=== Filming ===
"The Dance of Dragons" was directed by David Nutter. He also directed the subsequent episode, "Mother's Mercy".

== Reception ==
=== Ratings ===
"The Dance of Dragons" was watched by an estimated 7.14 million American viewers during its first airing. With Live+7 DVR viewing factored in, the episode had an overall rating of 9.92 million viewers, and a 5.2 in the 18–49 demographic. In the United Kingdom, the episode was viewed by 2.473 million viewers, making it the highest-rated broadcast that week. It also received 0.141 million timeshift viewers.

=== Critical reception ===
"The Dance of Dragons" received highly positive reviews, with many critics praising the episode's conclusion in Daznak's Pit. The showrunners's decision to have Stannis sacrifice Shireen, however, polarized critics, with some praising it as strong character development and others feeling it betrayed Stannis's character. The episode received a rating of 88% on the review aggregator Rotten Tomatoes from 33 reviews with an average rating of 8.9 out of 10 and the critics consensus reading "Underscored by an especially heartwrenching moment and a spectacular display of power, "The Dance of Dragons" successfully delivers the shock and awe audiences have come to expect from the series' penultimate episodes."

Matt Fowler of IGN heavily praised the episode, awarding it 9.3/10, an "amazing" score. He especially praised the episode's final act, stating "And just the spectacle of Dany climbing on top of Drogon, with care, and then soaring up and off into the sky was remarkable. It's funny that a huge moment for her as a Targaryen and the possible future leader of Westeros came right during one of her most bloody and spectacular failures as a Queen." He summarized his review by saying "GoT delivered another exciting (and unsettling) episode as Stannis made a big decision & Daenerys attended a tournament" and labelled Stannis's decision a strong point of the episode. Charlotte Runcie of The Daily Telegraph also reviewed the episode favorably: "Hurling Hollywood-level budgets behind a multi-season TV show paid rich rewards this week, from the enormous Gladiator-style sweep of the crowded coliseum arena to thrillingly choreographed fights to the death before a huge, baying audience." Runcie was also impressed with the Shireen sacrifice scene, calling it "one of the most upsetting scenes" in season 5.

Writing for The A.V. Club, both writers responded positively to the episode. Writing for people who have not read the novels, Brandon Nowalk awarded the episode an A−, praising Stannis's sacrifice of Shireen. He said "Stannis burning his daughter Shireen at the stake is the hardest Game of Thrones has hit since the Red Wedding, only this violence is completely drained of excitement. It’s not a shock moment, and there’s no gross-out gore as in Oberyn’s death. Instead it’s a long, cold death march. What’s most impressive is the pacing, which is not the season’s strongest suit." He also praised the episode's conclusion in Meereen by saying "The close-up of Dany taking Missandei’s hand is so vivid I’m practically getting misty now", and further stated "The CGI could use some polish, but nothing short of Shireen can turn my smile upside down." Writing for people who have read the novels, Myles McNutt awarded the episode a B+, praising the Meereen story by saying "It’s a powerful image, rendered as effectively as it could be given the budgetary limitations of the series. Watching Dany soar about the stadium on Drogon is an iconic image, but it’s not one that any other characters could really experience, which is meaningful in and of itself."

Erik Kain of Forbes was more critical of the sacrifice scene. While he praised the episode overall as "thrilling and tragic and intense," he called the sacrifice scene "a horrible, no-good, very bad, infuriating way to ruin Stannis as a character" and "a monstrosity of a writing decision." He also said the scene was "one of the most disturbing, baffling, and unnecessary departures from the books" that the show has so far presented, though he noted that the sacrifice scene had actually been George R. R. Martin's idea and that (with two installments of The Song of Ice and Fire still unpublished) it was unclear exactly how much Shireen's death in the show would deviate from her story arc in the books.

Finding a middle ground, Alyssa Rosenberg of The Washington Post agreed that the sacrifice scene was disturbing, but she found that David Nutter "did a beautiful job" directing it and believed that the scene wondrously developed Stannis as a character who is so fixated on "his own chosenness" that he will do anything to fulfill his claim to the throne. She also noted that the scene departed from the books so far, but would possibly be reconciled in one of the future installments.

Writing for Salon.com, Steven Attewell stated that "Stannis does not act here out of sadism, and contrary to Mr. Benioff, I don’t think it’s ambition either. Rather, Stannis truly believes that he is destined to save humanity (as opposed to sitting the Iron Throne). And Melisandre, as revealed in her POV chapters from 'A Dance With Dragons,' genuinely and sincerely shares that belief; of all her many illusions and deceptions, this isn’t one of them. And what’s genuinely troubling is that they might not be wrong."

=== Accolades ===
Year	Award	Category	Nominee(s)	Result	Ref.
2015	Primetime Emmy Awards	Outstanding Supporting Actress in a Drama Series	Emilia Clarke as Daenerys Targaryen	Nominated	
2015	Primetime Creative Arts Emmy Awards	Outstanding Cinematography for a Single-Camera Series	Rob McLachlan	Nominated	
2015	Primetime Creative Arts Emmy Awards	Outstanding Costumes for a Fantasy Series	Michele Clapton, Sheena Wichary, Nina Ayres, Alex Fordham	Nominated	
2015	Primetime Creative Arts Emmy Awards	Outstanding Single-Camera Picture Editing for a Drama series	Katie Weiland	Won	
2015	Primetime Creative Arts Emmy Awards	Outstanding Special Visual Effects	Steve Kullback, Joe Bauer, Adam Chazen, Jabbar Raisani, Eric Carney, Stuart Brisdon, Derek Spears, James Kinnings, Matthew Rouleau	Won	
2015	Hollywood Professional Alliance	Outstanding Visual Effects	Joe Bauer, Steve Kullback, Derek Spears, Eric Carney, Jabbar Raisani	Won	
2016	American Cinema Editors Awards 2016	Best Edited One-Hour Series For Non-Commercial Television	Katie Weiland	Nominated	
2016	Visual Effects Society Awards 2015	Outstanding Visual Effects in a Photoreal Episode	Joe Bauer, Steve Kullback, Eric Carney, Derek Spears, Stuart Brisdon for "The Dance of Dragons"	Won	
2016	Visual Effects Society Awards 2015	Outstanding Animated Performance in an Episode, Commercial, or Real-Time Project	James Kinnings, Michael Holzl, Joseph Hoback, Matt Derksen for "Dance of Dragons" - Drogon Arena Rescue	Nominated	
2016	Visual Effects Society Awards 2015	Outstanding Created Environment in an Episode, Commercial, or Real-Time Project	Rajeev B R., Loganathan Perumal, Ramesh Shankers, Anders Ericson for "Drogon Arena"	Nominated	
2016	Visual Effects Society Awards 2015	Outstanding Compositing in a Photoreal Episode	Dan Breckwoldt, Martin Furman, Sophie Marfleet, Eric Andrusyszyn for "Drogon Arena"	Nominated	
2016	Canadian Society of Cinematographers	TV series Cinematography	Robert McLachlan	Won	
