= New Labor Forum =

- Discipline: Industrial relations, Sociology, Political Science labor movement worker rights
- Language: English
- Edited by: Paula Finn

Publication details
- History: 1997–present
- Publisher: SAGE Publishing for the Murphy Institute, CUNY School of Labor and Urban Studies (United States of America)
- Frequency: Triannual

Standard abbreviations
- ISO 4: New Labor Forum

Indexing
- ISSN: 1095-7960 (print); 1557-2978 (web)
- LCCN: 98660553
- JSTOR: 10957960
- OCLC no.: 761548706

Links
- Journal homepage; New Labor Forum blog

New Labor Forum (ISSN 1095-7960, E-ISSN 1557-2978) is a national labor journal of debate, analysis and new ideas. New Labor Forum is published by the CUNY Joseph S. Murphy Institute and SAGE Press, three times a year, in January, May, and September. Founded in 1997, the journal provides a place for labor and its allies to consider vital research, debate strategy, and test new ideas.

== Overview ==
In its over two decades of publication, articles in the journal have covered the full range of challenges that confront workers and working-class communities.

On the domestic side, these issues have included:

- the dramatic growth of low wage service and precarious work
- the decline of manufacturing
- corporate domination in U.S. politics
- the privatization of public education
- the persistence of black unemployment at double or near double the rate for whites
- mass incarceration
- immigration raids and the super exploitation of immigrant workers
- sexual harassment at work
- pay inequity
- LGBTQ workplace discrimination
- labor's relationship to the American empire and wars without end
- the climate change crisis.

Internationally, contributors to the journal have examined:

- organized labor and economic justice in post-Apartheid South Africa
- the rise and fall of the pink tide in Latin America
- efforts to organize among informal workers throughout the global south, and
- the rise of economic nationalism throughout Europe.

The journal provides a place for labor and its allies to introduce new ideas and debate old concepts. Recent contributors include: Andy Stern, Frances Fox Piven, Bill Fletcher, David Roediger, JoAnn Wypijewski, Jonathan Tasini, Ruth Milkman, and Maria Elena Durazo. Its editorial board is composed of a number of notable scholars, including Kate Bronfenbrenner, Joshua Freeman, and Paul Buhle. Kent Wong was part of the founding editorial board. Each issue of the journal also includes a "Books and the Arts" section that publishes poetry and book/film reviews.

New Labor Forum has a subscription base of approximately 7,000 individuals and institutions.

New Labor Forum is often considered a critical journal of thought within the American labor movement. For example, its January 2006 issue contained articles linked to the first-of-its-kind (and controversial) Global Unions Conference. In the winter of 2007, Robert Pollin, co-director of the Political Economy Research Institute at the University of Massachusetts Amherst, began a regular column in New Labor Forum titled "Economic Prospects." The AFL–CIO has cited New Labor Forum, although the magazine is often critical of that labor federation. Katrina vanden Heuvel, editor of The Nation magazine, called the journal "invaluable".
