= Richard Hurd (educator) =

Richard Hurd is a professor of labor relations emeritus and former director of Labor Studies at the Cornell University School of Industrial and Labor Relations.

Hurd has a Ph.D. in economics from Vanderbilt University.

Prior to his appointment at Cornell, Hurd was an economic policy fellow at the Brookings Institution.

Hurd's research focus is on the modern labor movement, organizing strategies, and organizational change in unions. He also has an interest in the organization of professional and technical workers. Hurd is frequently quoted in mainstream newspapers and magazines.

Hurd has been a consultant for the Canadian Labour Congress, AFL-CIO, Department for Professional Employees, the Albert Shanker Institute, the New York State United Teachers, the Service Employees International Union, UNITE HERE, and the American Guild of Musical Artists.

== Memberships ==
Hurd serves on the executive committee of the National Center for the Study of Collective Bargaining in Higher Education.

== Published works ==
=== Co-edited books ===
- Bronfenbrenner, Kate; Friedman, Sheldon; Hurd, Richard W.; Oswald, Rudolph A.; and Seeber, Ronald L. Organizing to Win: New Research on Union Strategies. Ithaca, N.Y.: ILR Press, 1998. ISBN 0-8014-8446-4
- Hurd, Richard W.; Oswald, Rudolph A.; Seeber, Ronald L.; and Friedman, Sheldon. Restoring the Promise of American Labor Law. Ithaca, N.Y.: ILR Press, 1994. ISBN 0-87546-326-6
- Turner, Lowell; Katz, Harry C.; and Hurd, Richard W. Rekindling the Movement: Labor's Quest for Relevance in the Twenty-First Century. Ithaca, N.Y.: ILR Press, 2001. ISBN 0-8014-8712-9

=== Solely authored book chapters ===
- "The Rise and Fall of the Organizing Model in the U.S." In Trade Unions and Democracy: Strategies and Perspectives. Mark Harcourt and Geoffrey Wood, eds. Manchester, England: Manchester University Press, 2004. ISBN 1-4128-0571-6

=== Co-authored book chapters ===
- Hurd, Richard W.; Behrens, Martin; and Hamann, Kerstin. "Union Revitalization: Concepts and Theory." In Varieties of Unionism: Strategies for Union Revitalization in a Globalizing Economy. Carola Frege and John Kelly, eds. New York: Oxford University Press, 2004. ISBN 0-19-927014-7
- Hurd, Richard W.; Behrens, Martin; and Waddington, Jeremy. "Can Structural Change be a Source of Union Revitalization?" In Varieties of Unionism: Strategies for Union Revitalization in a Globalizing Economy. Carola Frege and John Kelly, eds. New York: Oxford University Press, 2004. ISBN 0-19-927014-7
- Hurd, Richard W. and Fletcher, Bill. "Political Will, Local Union Transformation and the Organizing Imperative." In Which Direction for Organized Labor? Bruce Nissen, ed. Detroit: Wayne State University Press, 1998. ISBN 0-8143-2779-6

=== Solely authored articles ===
- "Beyond Labor's Brawl: Strategic Conundrums Await." Social Policy. Summer 2005.
- "The Failure of Organizing, the New Unity Partnership and the Future of the Labor Movement." WorkingUSA. September, 2004.
- "In Defense of Public Service: Union Strategy in Transition." WorkingUSA. Summer 2003.
- "Union Free Bargaining Strategies and First Contract Failures." Proceedings of the Forty-Eighth Meeting of the Industrial Relations Research Association. January 1996.

=== Co-authored articles ===
- Hurd, Richard W. and Pinnock, Sharon. "Public Sector Unions: Will They Thrive or Struggle to Survive?" Journal of Labor Research. 15:2 (Spring 2004).

=== Solely authored papers ===
- Professional Workers, Unions, and Associations: Affinities and Antipathies. Paper prepared for the Albert Shanker Institute. Summer 2000.
