= Ravenswood (book) =

1999 non-fiction book

Ravenswood: The Steelworkers' Victory and the Revival of American Labor is a labor history book by Tom Juravich and Kate Bronfenbrenner. It was published by Cornell University Press in 1999.

== Synopsis ==
Ravenswood chronicles the story of the United Steelworkers' two-year lockout (1991–1992) at the Ravenswood Aluminum plant in West Virginia, which was owned at the time by commodities trader Marc Rich. The union used a strategy of in-depth financial and corporate research, community organizing, coalition-building and a multinational trade union pressure campaign that united workers in West Virginia with trade unionists in Eastern and Western Europe and Latin America. Ultimately, the steel workers were able to compel the company to recognize their union and agree to a collective bargaining agreement which included a union security clause, which the company had long refused to grant.

== Reception and legacy ==
The book is often used as a case study that identifies a "comprehensive corporate campaign" model for labor union organizing.
