= Marcelo Suárez-Orozco =

Argentine anthropologist

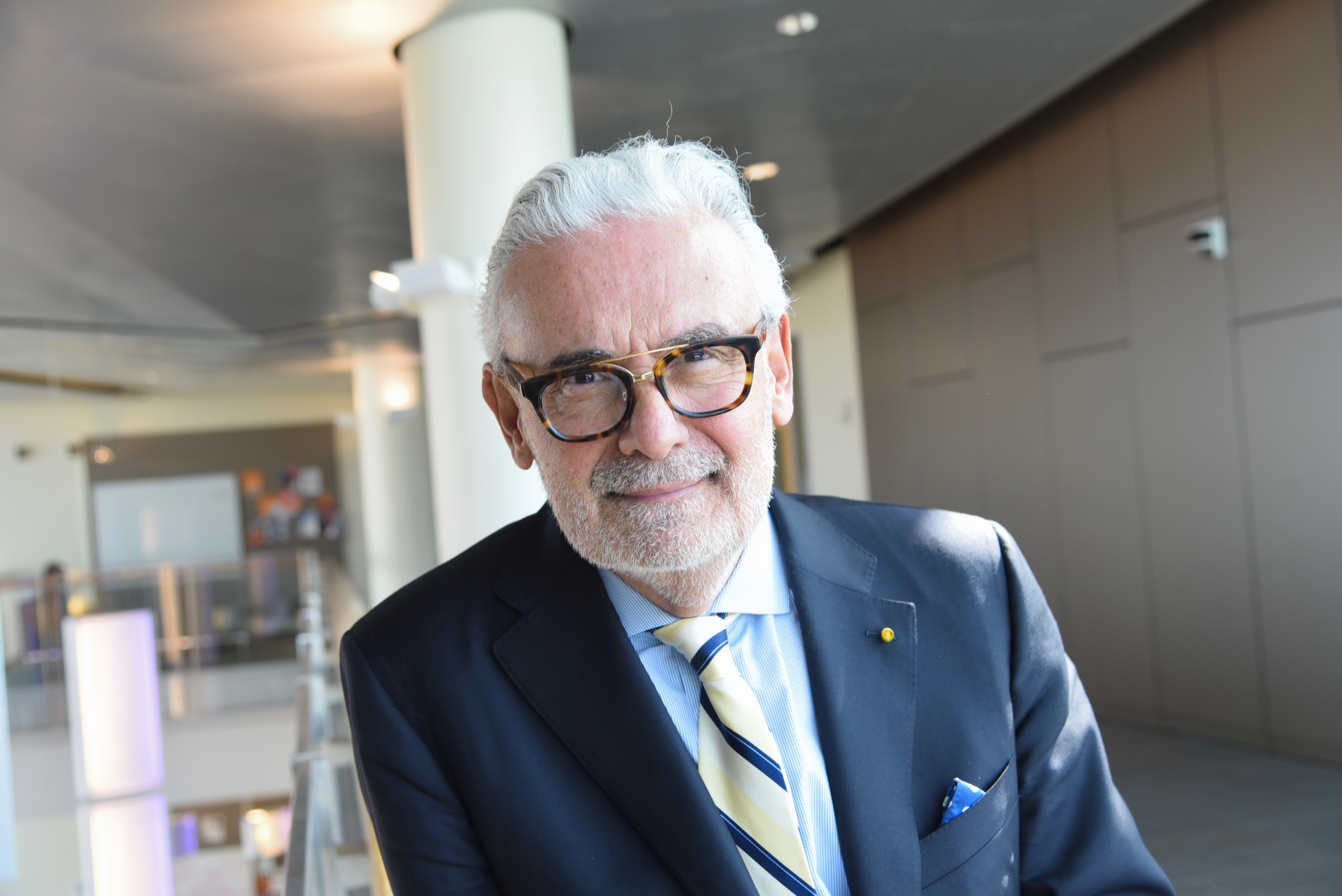
- Suárez-Orozco in 2020

9th Chancellor of UMass Boston
- Incumbent
- Assumed office 1 August 2020
- Preceded by: J. Keith Motley; Katherine Newman (interim)

Personal details
- Born: Buenos Aires, Argentina
- Spouse: Carola Suárez-Orozco
- Education: University of California, Berkeley
- Website: Official website

Marcelo M. Suárez-Orozco is an Argentine anthropologist who is the ninth chancellor of the University of Massachusetts Boston. He is best known for his research on immigration, education and globalization, and is the first Latino to lead a campus in the Massachusetts public university system. Prior to his return to the Commonwealth, Dr. Suárez-Orozco served as the inaugural UCLA Wasserman Dean at UCLA School of Education and Information Studies.

Pope Francis appointed Suárez-Orozco to the Executive Committee of Pontifical Academy of Social Sciences in January 2018.

== Early life and education ==
Suárez-Orozco is a native of Buenos Aires, Argentina, and immigrated to the United States at age 17. After studying in community college, he earned a B.A. in psychology (1980), a master’s degree (1981) and a Ph.D. in anthropology (1986) from the University of California, Berkeley.

== Career ==
Suárez-Orozco served as a special adviser for education, peace, and justice to the chief prosecutor of the International Criminal Court in The Hague.

He served as UCLA's Wasserman Dean of Education & Information Studies for eight years and raised an estimated $120 million in support of the school.

At Harvard he was the Victor S. Thomas Professor of Education and co-founder of the Harvard Immigration Project with his wife, Carola Suárez-Orozco. At NYU he served as the Courtney Sale Ross University Professor of Globalization and Education at New York University.

His research topics include psychological anthropology and cultural psychology, with a focus on globalization, education, mass migration and climate change.

== Chancellor at UMass Boston ==
Suárez-Orozco became chancellor of the University of Massachusetts Boston in August 2020, announcing initiatives to move the university toward "becoming a leading anti-racist and health promoting public research university."

He created the position of special assistant to the chancellor for Black life. In July 2020, Suárez-Orozco and his wife, Carola, established the George Floyd Honorary Scholarship Fund.

== Honors ==
• Member of the Executive Committee, Pontifical Academy of Social Sciences, The Vatican (Appointed by Pope Francis, June 2019)
• Member of the Pontifical Academy of Social Sciences, The Vatican (Appointed by Pope Francis, January 2018)
• Great Immigrant/Great American, The Carnegie Corporation of New York (Elected July 4, 2018).”
• Member of the American Academy of Arts and Sciences (Elected April 2014).
• Orden Mexicana del Águila Azteca (The Mexican Order of the Aztec Eagle), 2006
• Member of the National Academy of Education (Elected April 2004)

== Books ==
Suárez-Orozco has co-authored and edited books published by Harvard University Press, Stanford University Press, University of California Press, Cambridge University Press, New York University Press, Columbia University Press and others.

He is a co-author of the Planetary Climate Resilience protocol - the Pontifical Academies, signed by Pope Francis. His books include:

• Central American Refugees and U.S. High Schools: A Psychosocial Study of Motivation and Achievement, 1989
• Transformations: Immigration, Family Life, and Achievement Motivation Among Latino Adolescents, 1996
• Crossings: Mexican Immigration in Interdisciplinary Perspectives, 1998
• Children of Immigration, 2001 (The Developing Child)
• Cultures under Siege: Collective Violence and Trauma, 2001
• Latinos: Remaking America, 2002
• Globalization: Culture and Education in the Millennium, 2004
• The New Immigration: An Interdisciplinary Reader, 2005
• Learning in the Global Era: International Perspectives on Globalization and Education, 2007
• Learning a New Land: Immigrant Students in American Society, 2008 (Winner of the Stone Award for Best Book on Education)
• Educating the Whole Child for the Whole World: The Ross School Model and Education for the Global Era, 2010
• Writing Immigration: Scholars and Journalists in Dialogue, 2011
• Global Migration, Diversity, and Civic Education: Improving Policy and Practice, 2016 (Multicultural Education Series)
• Humanitarianism and Mass Migration: Confronting the World Crisis, 2019
