= Katherine Newman =

American sociologist and university administrator

Katherine S. Newman
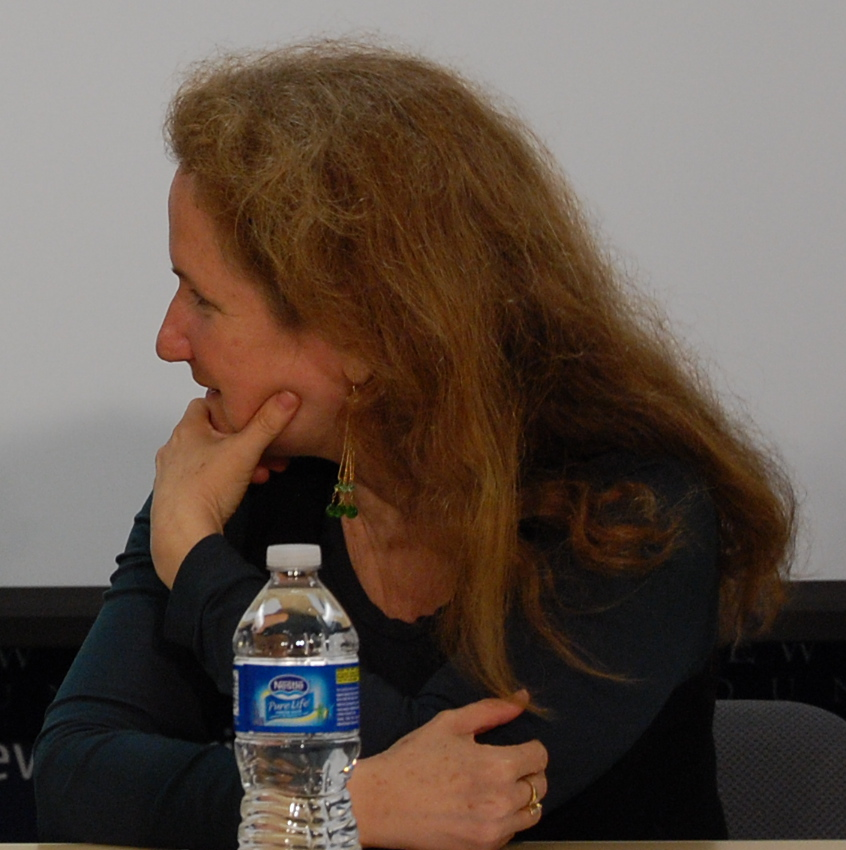
- Katherine Newman speaks at the New America Foundation's "Inequality and the Great Recession" event

Provost and Executive Vice President for Academic Affairs, University of California
- Incumbent
- Assumed office 9 January 2023
- Preceded by: Michael Brown

Chancellor of UMass Boston Interim
- In office 1 July 2018 – 1 July 2020
- Preceded by: Barry Mills (interim)
- Succeeded by: Marcelo Suárez-Orozco

Personal details
- Born: February 21, 1953 (age 73)
- Education: University of California, San Diego; University of California, Berkeley
- Occupation: University Professor; University Dean; University Provost

Katherine S. Newman (born February 21, 1953) is an American academic administrator and author who currently serves as the Provost and Executive Vice President of the University of California System. Newman previously served as the System Chancellor for Academic Programs and Economic Development of the University of Massachusetts [July 2017-December 2022]. In addition, she served as the interim Chancellor of the University of Massachusetts Boston from July 1, 2018, to August 1, 2020. She was formerly the Provost of UMass Amherst and Dean of the School of Arts and Sciences at Johns Hopkins University. She was also a professor at Princeton University and Harvard University. At Columbia University, Newman was a professor of anthropology.

Newman received a Robert F. Kennedy Book Award for No Shame in My Game in 2000.

== Personal life ==
Newman is married to Paul Attewell and they have two grown children, David and Steven Attewell.

== Bibliography ==
- Law and Economic Organization: A Comparative Study of Preindustrial Societies (1983)
- Falling from Grace: Downward Mobility in the Age of Affluence (1989)
- Declining Fortunes: The Withering Of The American Dream (1993)
- No Shame in My Game: The Working Poor in the Inner City (1999)
- A Different Shade of Gray: Midlife and Beyond in the city (2003)
- Rampage: The Social Roots of School Shootings (2004) with David Harding, Cybelle Fox, Jal Mehta, and Wendy Roth.
- Chutes and Ladders: Navigating the Low-Wage Labor Market (2006)
- The Missing Class: Portraits of the Near Poor in America (2007), with Victor Tan Chen
- Who Cares?: Public Ambivalence and Government Activism from the New Deal to the Second Gilded Age (2010), with Elisabeth Jacobs
- Taxing the Poor: Doing Damage to the Truly Disadvantaged (2011), with Rourke O'Brien
- The Accordion Family: Boomerang Kids, Anxious Parents, and the Private Toll of Global Competition (2012)
- After Freedom: The Rise of the Post-Apartheid Generation in Democratic South Africa (2014), with Ariane De Lannoy
- Reskilling America: Learning to Labor in the Twenty-First Century (2016), with Hella Winston
- Downhill from Here: Retirement Insecurity in the Age of Inequality (2019)
- Moving the Needle: What Tight Labor Markets Do for the Poor (2023), with Elisabeth Jacobs
