= Unearthed and Understood =

Unearthed & Understood
- Directed by: Eduardo Montes-Bradley
- Written by: Eduardo Montes-Bradley
- Produced by: University of Virginia
- Starring: Rita Dove, Julian Bond, Larry Sabato et al
- Cinematography: Eduardo Montes-Bradley
- Edited by: Eduardo Montes-Bradley
- Music by: Money Musk, and others
- Release date: October 2014
- Running time: 18 minutes
- Country: United States
- Language: English

Unearthed & Understood is a documentary produced by the President's Commission on Slavery and the university at the University of Virginia. The film, produced and directed by Eduardo Montes-Bradley for Heritage Film Project, premiered at the "Universities Confronting the Legacy of Slavery" symposium in Charlottesville on October 16, 2014.

== Argument ==
In a series of interviews with members of the President's Commission on Slavery and the university, the film expresses current state of affairs, concerns and hopes for the work ahead as the University of Virginia investigates its painful past of slavery and slave trade. The President's Commission on Slavery and the university objective is to provide recommendations on the commemoration of the University of Virginia's historical relationship to slavery. It was established in September 2013. Unearthed and Understood is its first documentary presentation.

== Billing Block ==
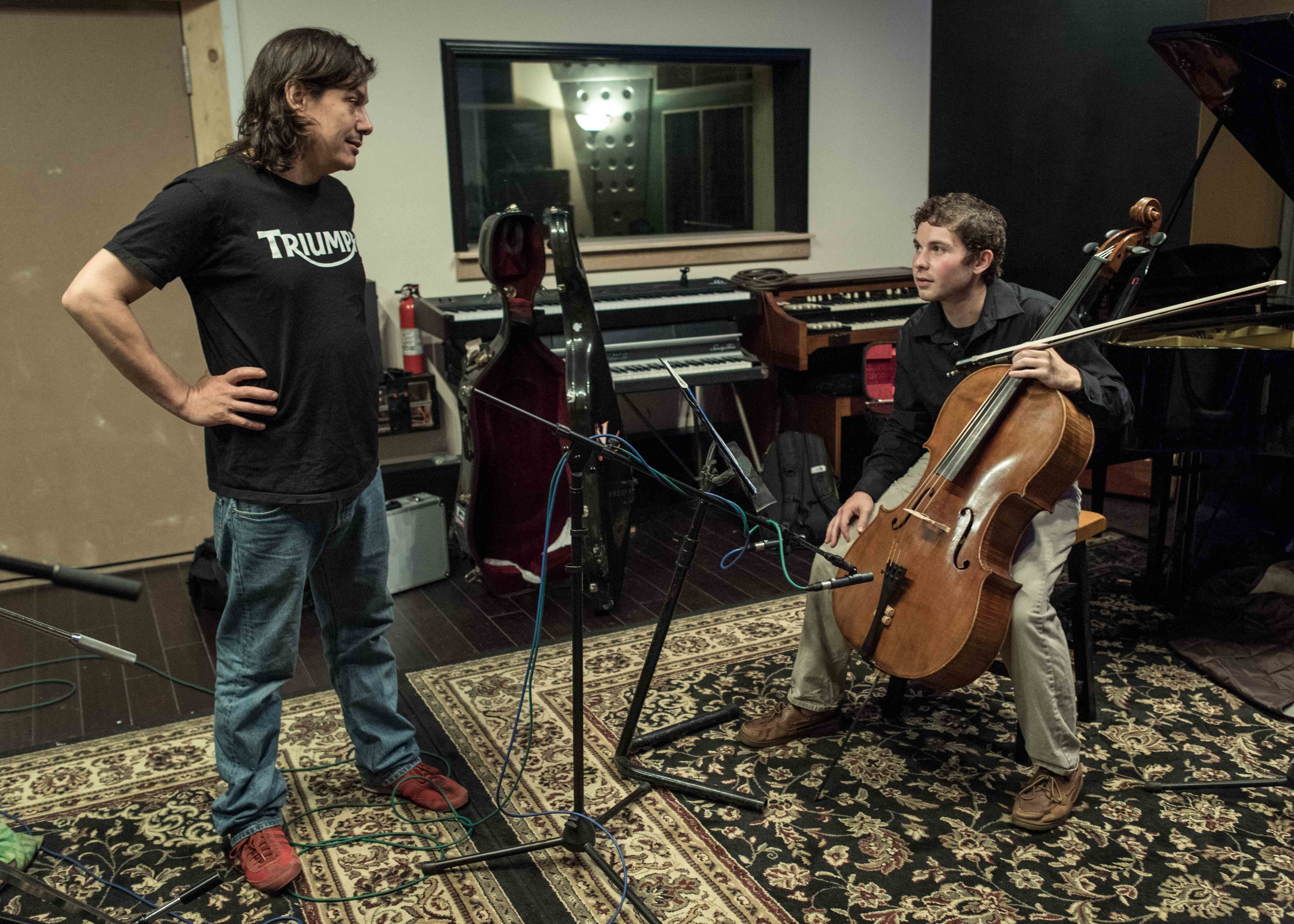
Cellist Phillip Munck and sound engineer during the recording session of Money Musk from Thomas Jefferson's music sheet found at Monticello, for the documentary Unearthed and Understood

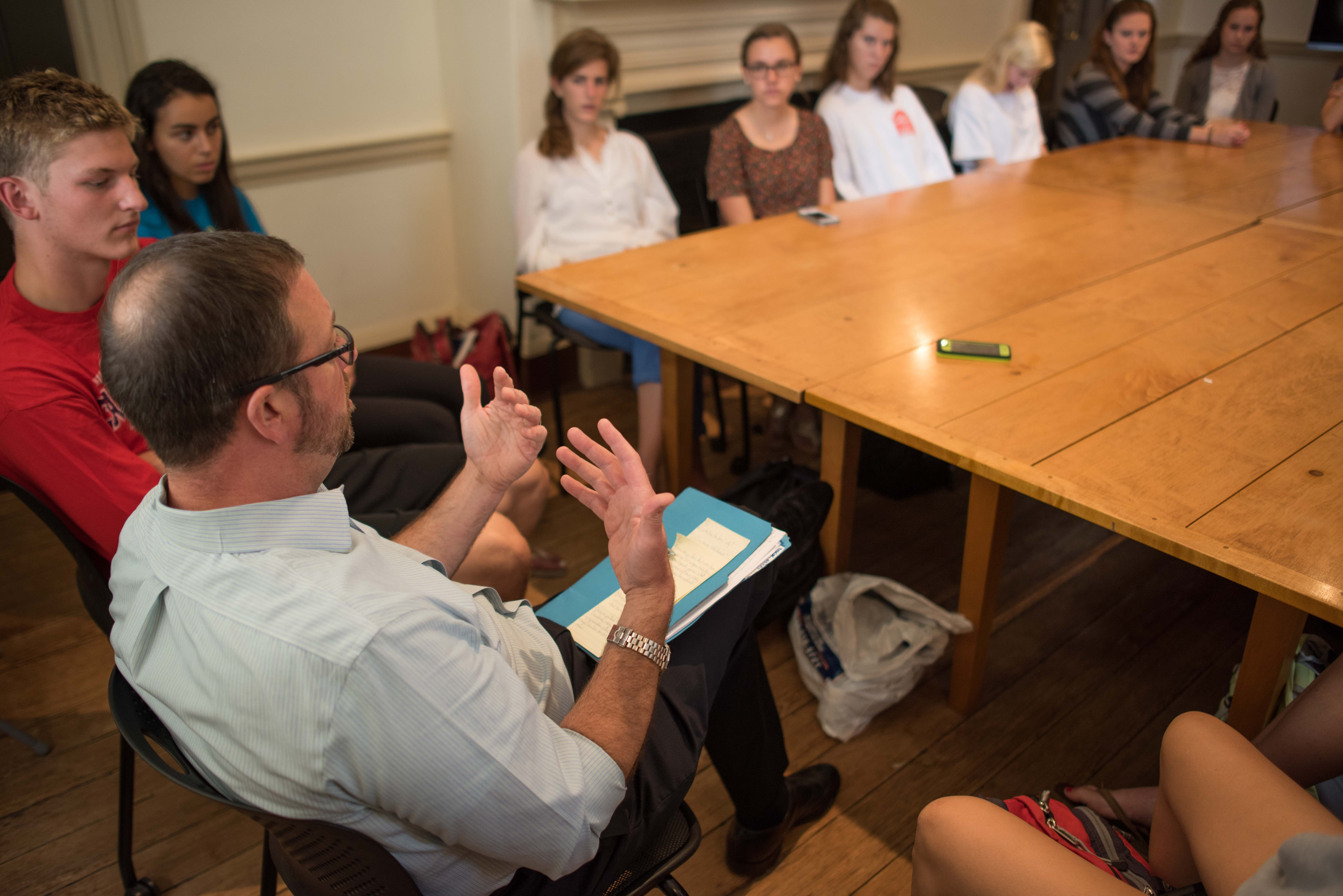
Professor Kirt vonDaacke at work teaching the history of the University of Virginia and Slavery in the documentary film Unearthed and Understood

Name	Director	Producer	Interviewed	Notes
University of Virginia		Yes		Presidents Commission on Slavery and the university
Heritage Film Project		Yes		Production Entity
Eduardo Montes-Bradley	Yes	Yes		Producer, writer, cinematographer, editor
Teresa A. Sullivan			Yes	President of the University of Virginia
Dr. Marcus Martin		Yes	Yes	Executive Producer. Co-chair PCSU, Vice President and Chief Officer for Diversity and Equity
Rita Dove			Yes	
University of Virginia		Yes		Producer
Meghan Saunders Faulkner		Yes		Production Coordinator
Soledad Liendo		Yes		Line Producer
Kirt vonDaacke		Yes	Yes	Executive Producer. Co-chair PCSU, Associate Professor of History. Historian, Author.
Julian Bond			Yes	
Larry Sabato			Yes	Interviewed in Washington, DC
Benjamin P. Ford			Yes	Principal Investigator at Rivanna Archeological Services, LLC
Kelley Deetz			Yes	Postdoctoral Research Associate
Rev. Dr. Alvin Edwards			Yes	Mt. Zion First African Baptist Church
Ervin Jordan			Yes	Associate Professor and Special Collections Research Archivist
Andrea Douglas			Yes	Director of the Jefferson School African American Heritage Center
Lynn Rainville			Yes	
Edna Turay			Yes	Member of Memorial for Enslaved Laborers
Rev. Hodari Hamilton			Yes	First Baptist Church
Rev. Lloyd Cosby			Yes	Zion Union Baptist Church
Lucia "Cinder" Stanton			Yes	Monticello's Shannon Senior Historian. Author
Maurie McInnis			Yes	Professor of Art History and Vice Provost for Academic Affairs
Tierney Fairchild			Yes	Chair of the U.Va. IDEA Fund
Alex Johnson			Yes	Professor in the School of Law
Deborah E. McDowell			Yes	Professor of English and Director of the Carter G. Woodson Institute of African-American and African Studies
