= Carola Suárez-Orozco =

Cultural developmental psychologist, academic

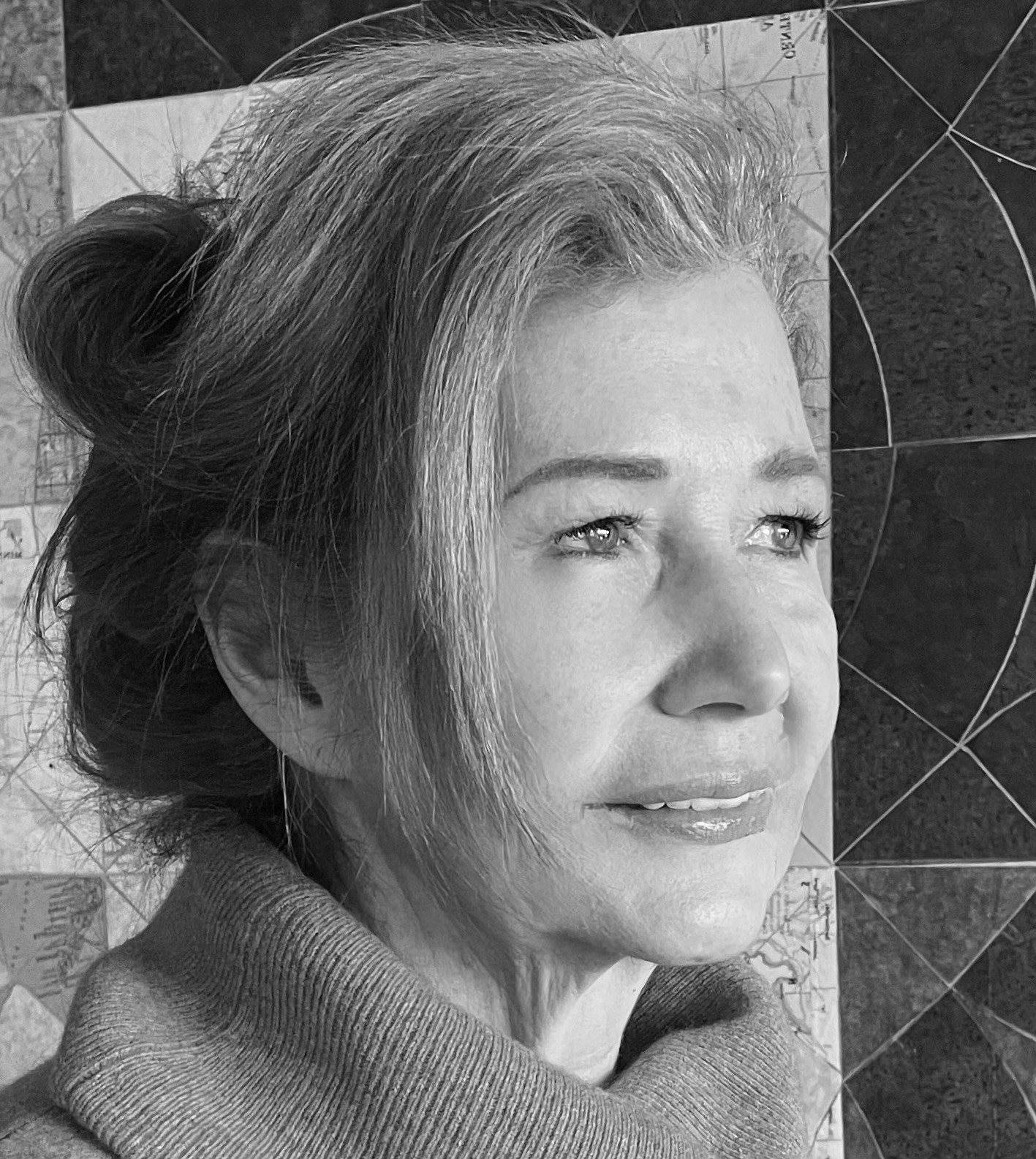
- Born: Lausanne, Switzerland
- Occupations: Psychologist, academic, and author

Academic background
- Education: University of California, Berkeley (BA); John F. Kennedy University (MA); California School of Professional Psychology (PhD)

Academic work
- Institutions: Harvard Graduate School of Education; New York University; University of California, Los Angeles

Carola Suárez-Orozco is a cultural developmental psychologist, academic, and author known for her research on the psychology of immigration, adolescent development, and educational equity. She is a professor in residence at the Harvard Graduate School of Education, and the director of the immigration initiative at Harvard. She is also the co-founder of Re-Imagining Migration, a nonprofit organization. She was awarded a Guggenheim fellowship in 2024.

She has held faculty positions at New York University, UCLA, and Harvard University.

== Biography ==
Suárez-Orozco was born in 1958. After spending her early years being raised in Lausanne, Saurez-Orozco emigrated along with family to the United States at the age of 5.She moved originally to the Los Angeles area and then moved around a lot, attending 9 different schools across the country. At just 17 years old, Suarez-Orozco met her husband who came from the Dirty War in Argentina.

She received her Bachelor's degree in Development Studies from the University of California, Berkeley in 1978, and a Master's degree in Clinical Psychology from John F. Kennedy University in 1980. She went on to enroll at the California School of Professional Psychology, in 1988. She completed her Clinical Internship in the Department of Psychiatry at the University of California, San Diego, earning her Doctoral degree in Clinical Psychology in 1993.

== Career ==
She began her professional career in the mid-1990s, initially working as a school psychologist at Escondido Union School District and as a guidance counselor at Cambridge Rindge and Latin School. In 1997, she joined the Harvard Graduate School of Education as a Research Associate and Lecturer, where she co-directed the Harvard Immigration Project. She also served as Managing Director of the Immigration Project and Co-Principal Investigator of the Longitudinal Immigrant Student Adaptation Study.

In 2004, She became an associate professor at New York University’s Steinhardt School of Education in the Department of Applied Psychology and Teaching & Learning. She was promoted to full professor in 2006. During her time at NYU, she was involved in the development of the Immigration Studies Program and directed the School Psychology Program. In 2007, she was appointed Chair of the Department of Applied Psychology.

In 2012, she left New York University, and served as a professor at the University of California, Los Angeles until 2022 and is now professor emeritus. She was appointed professor in residence at Harvard University Graduate School of Education in 2022 and directs the Immigration Initiative at Harvard. Since July 2022, she has been serving as professor in residence at Harvard University Graduate School of Education. In 2022, she was also appointed as the Director of the Immigration Initiative at Harvard.

She has authored or co-authored books, including Transformations: Immigration, Family Life, and Achievement Motivation Among Latino Adolescents, Children of Immigration, Learning a New Land, Immigrant-Origin Students in Community College, and Education: A Global Compact for a Time of Crisis.

== Research ==
Suárez-Orozco's focuses her research on child, adolescent, and young adult experiences of immigration, while covering a broad range of topics including academic engagement and achievement, identity formation, family separations, civic engagement, and the unauthorized experience.

Her early seminal study includes the Longitudinal Student Adaptation Study (LISA) funded by the NSF, the Spencer, and William T. Grant Foundations. This longitudinal study which she ran out of the Harvard Immigration Project followed 400 immigrant newcomer young adolescents originating from China, Central America, the Dominican Republic, Haiti, and Mexico for 5 years. The study led to multiple journal articles as well as the Harvard University Press book-- Learning a New Land: Immigrant Students in American Society.

She led a study of immigrant origin young adults attending community colleges. Funded by the William T. Grant Foundation, the Research on Immigrants in Community College (RICC) study considered the experience of 646 immigrant community college students attending 3 community colleges in New York.

In addition, in 2016, she was awarded a Lyle Spencer Foundation Grant to research the role of teacher enactments of bias in K-12 classrooms. She has also co-led a study, with Ford Foundation surveying over 900 undocumented college undergraduates across the country. Most recently she has led the Ford Foundation work entitled—"Bridging the Compassion Gap" Addressing Social Inclusion for Immigrant Origin Children & Youth.

== Personal life ==
She has been married to Argentine born anthropologist and academic Marcelo Suárez-Orozco since 1977 with whom she has written and collaborated with.

== Awards and honors ==
- 2024 – Guggenheim Fellow
- 1996 – Best Book Award, Society for Research on Adolescence Social Policy
- 2002 – Roberta Grodberg Simmons Prize Lecture, Society for Research on Adolescence
- 2006 – Inducted into the New York Academy of Sciences
- 2006 – Presidential Citation, American Psychological Association
- 2007 – Virginia & Warren Stone Award, Harvard University Press’ Outstanding Book on Education and Society
- 2009 – Fellowship, Institute for Advanced Study
- 2010 to 2012 – Chair, American Psychological Association Presidential Task Force on Immigration
- 2016 – Member, National Academy of Education
- 2016 – Award for Best Edited Book, Society for Research on Adolescence Social Policy
- 2018 – Award for Best Article, Society for Research on Adolescence Social Policy
- 2019 – Undergraduate Mentoring Award, UCLA
- 2020 – Arthur W. Staats Prize Lecture for Unifying Psychology, American Psychological Association APA Division

== Bibliography ==
=== Books ===
- Transformations: Immigration, Family Life, and Achievement Motivation Among Latino Adolescents (1995) ISBN 9780804725514
- Children of Immigration (2001) ISBN 9780674004924
- La Infancia de la Inmigración (2003) ISBN 9788471124715
- Understanding the Social Worlds of Immigrant Youth: New Directions for Youth Development (2004) ISBN 9780787972677
- The New Immigration: An Interdisciplinary Reader (2005) ISBN 9780415949156
- Històries d´immigració: la comprensió dels patrons de rendiment escolar dels joves immigrants nouvinguts (2008) ISBN 9788483349182
- Learning a New Land: Immigrant Students in American Society (2008) ISBN 9780674026759
- Frameworks and Ethics for Research with Immigrants: New Directions for Child and Adolescent Development (2013) ISBN 9781118769997
- Transitions: The Development of Children of Immigrants (2015) ISBN 9780814770177
- Immigrant-Origin Students in Community College: Navigating Risk and Reward in Higher Education (2019) ISBN 9780807761946
- Education: A Global Compact for a Time of Crisis (2022) ISBN 9780231204354

=== Selected articles ===
- Suárez-Orozco, C., Pimentel, A., & Martin, M. (2009). The significance of relationships: Academic engagement and achievement among newcomer immigrant youth. Teachers college record, 111(3), 712–749.
- Suárez-Orozco, C., Rhodes, J., & Milburn, M. (2009). Unraveling the immigrant paradox: Academic engagement and disengagement among recently arrived immigrant youth. Youth & Society, 41(2), 151–185.
- Suárez-Orozco, C., Gaytán, F. X., Bang, H. J., Pakes, J., O'Connor, E., & Rhodes, J. (2010). Academic trajectories of newcomer immigrant youth. Developmental psychology, 46(3), 602.
- Suárez-Orozco, C., Yoshikawa, H., Teranishi, R., & Suárez-Orozco, M. (2011). Growing up in the shadows: The developmental implications of unauthorized status. Harvard Educational Review, 81(3), 438–473.
- Suárez-Orozco, C. (2012). Identities under siege: Immigration stress and social mirroring among the children of immigrants. In The new immigration (pp. 149–170). Routledge.
