= Joseph S. Murphy =

American political scientist (1933–1998)

Joseph Samson Murphy
- Born: November 15, 1933; Newark, New Jersey
- Died: January 17, 1998 (aged 64)
- Education: University of Colorado; Olivet College; University of North Carolina at Chapel Hill; Brandeis University
- Occupations: political scientist and university administrator
- Employer: City University of New York
- Known for: fifth President of Queens College; seventh President of Bennington College; Chancellor of the City University of New York
- Title: Chancellor
- Awards: Woodrow Wilson Fellowship

Joseph Samson Murphy (November 15, 1933 – January 17, 1998) was an American political scientist and university administrator, who was President of Queens College, President of Bennington College, and Chancellor of the City University of New York.

== Early life and education ==
Murphy was born in Newark, New Jersey, the son of Doris and Joseph Murphy, a labor organizer. He learned to speak Yiddish from his mother, a Polish Jew, and Gaelic from his father, an Irish longshoreman. Murphy graduated from Weequahic High School in 1951.

He attended the University of Colorado, and then attended and received his bachelor's degree in philosophy with honors from Olivet College in 1955. Murphy worked towards a master's degree at the University of North Carolina at Chapel Hill, and received a master's degree in 1959 and his doctorate in 1961 from Brandeis University in philosophy and political theory. He was a recipient of the Woodrow Wilson Fellowship.

== Career ==
A political scientist, Murphy was then an assistant professor at Brandeis, where he taught until 1965. He held various positions in the federal government, including in the Peace Corps (in St. Croix, in the Virgin Islands, and in Ethiopia) and Job Corps. He then became vice chancellor for higher education for the State of New Jersey and its 185,000 students in 1970, a position he held for one year.

Murphy next served as the fifth President of 28,000-student Queens College for six years, beginning in 1971. He was then the seventh President of Bennington College at 43 years of age, a position he held for six years.

Murphy was Chancellor of the City University of New York (CUNY) from 1982 to 1990, when he resigned. CUNY at the time was the third-largest university in the United States, with over 180,000 students. The New York Times described him as being known “for his ability to combine a practical knowledge of politics with an enduring commitment to the poor and the working class.”

After his tenure as chancellor, he taught as University Professor of Political Science at the CUNY Graduate Center. He also served as a member of the board of the UNESCO Global Project from 1992, and the YIVO Institute for Jewish Research from 1993. He died in a car accident in Ethiopia on January 17, 1998, at the age of 64.

The Joseph S. Murphy Institute for Worker Education and Labor Studies, formerly at the CUNY School of Professional Studies now at the CUNY School of Labor and Urban Studies, was named after him. It was established in 1984 as a Queens College program offering courses and programs in labor and urban studies. It was re-established as a university-wide institute in 2005.

The Joseph S. Murphy Scholarship is named after him. It is a challenge-grant scholarship of up to $30,000 for undergraduate and graduate students entering the labor studies degree programs at the Joseph S. Murphy Institute for Worker Education and Labor Studies.
