= Community Change =

American nonprofit organization

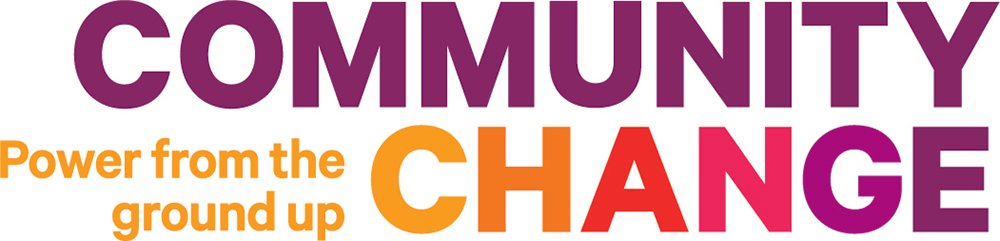
- Founded: 1968
- Type: Nonprofit
- Location: Washington, D.C.
- President: Dorian Warren
- Revenue: $43.6 million (2024)
- Website: communitychange.org

Community Change, formerly the Center for Community Change (CCC), is a progressive community organizing group active in the United States. It was founded in 1968 in response to civil rights concerns of the 1960s and to honor Robert F. Kennedy. The organization's stated mission is "To build the power and capacity of low-income people, especially low-income people of color, to change the policies and institutions that impact their lives."

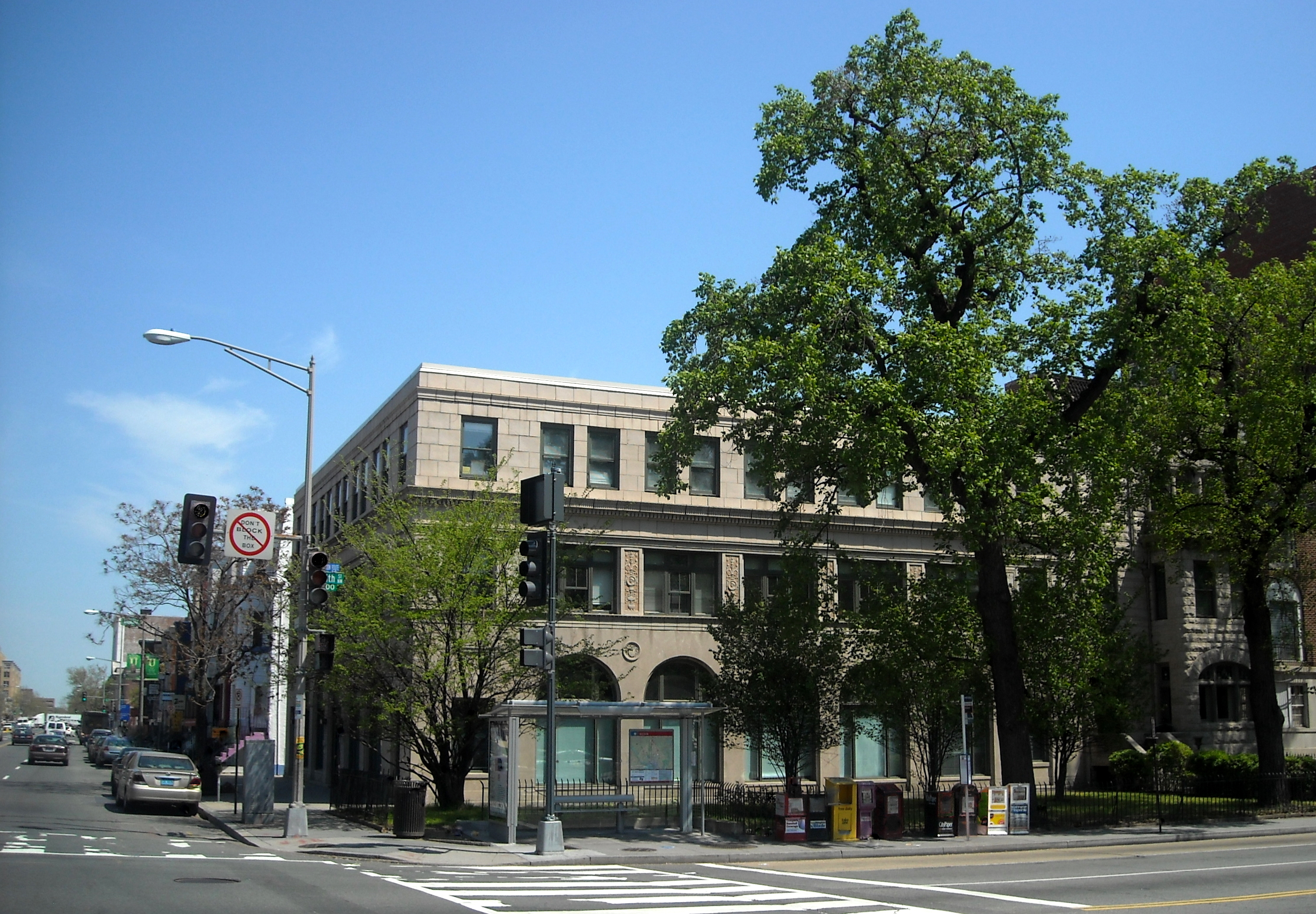
Community Change headquarters in Washington, D.C.

== Activities ==
Community Change generally works in low-income areas, especially within communities of color, and attempts to create resident-based groups to work on local issues of concern. The organization sponsors internships and training programs in several areas, including community organizing, service learning, union organizing, electoral engagement, and youth/student organizing. The organization provides resources for grassroots groups including campaign strategy, funding and social media strategy. In 2004, through the collaboration with immigrant groups, Community Change organized the Fair Immigration Reform Movement that "empowered immigrants to speak out". Community Change has helped to create government programs like the Community Reinvestment Act and the food stamps program.

The Center for Community Change launched the Fair Immigration Reform Movement (FIRM), an immigration reform movement working for comprehensive immigration reform. FIRM received funding from the Open Society Foundations and the Ford Foundation.

== Funding ==
Community Change has received funding from a range of progressive organizations including the Alliance for Early Success, Bill & Melinda Gates Foundation, Carnegie Corporation of New York, Center on Budget and Policy Priorities, Democracy Alliance, Every Citizen Counts, Human Rights Campaign, MoveOn, New America (organization), Planned Parenthood, the Tides Advocacy Fund, and The Voter Participation Center.

== See also ==
- Stephanie Land, a writing fellow for Community Change
