= New Forms of Worker Organization =

2014 book by Immanuel Ness

- Author: Immanuel Ness
- Publisher: PM Press
- Publication date: 2014

New Forms of Worker Organization: The Syndicalist and Autonomist Restoration of Class-Struggle Unionism is a 2014 book edited by Immanuel Ness with case studies of contemporaneous workers' control and direct action in the labor movement.
