= Fair Immigration Reform Movement =

American grassroots progressive movement

The Fair Immigration Reform Movement (FIRM) is a grassroots movement that supports comprehensive immigration reform and the civil rights of immigrants in the United States. It was started in 2004 by the Community Change, formerly The Center for Community Change. FIRM includes a coalition of 30 immigration rights movement organizations across the United States. Its goals are to help grassroots organizations form a collective voice around comprehensive immigration reform and to address issues facing immigrants.

Since its inception in 2004, FIRM has served as a hub of "comprehensive immigration reform and the civil rights of immigration" in the United States. The movement has mobilized hundreds of immigrant and non-immigrant organizations to collectively call for the improvement of the lives of marginalized communities of color, gender, race, and ethnicity.
