= Alliance for Early Success =

U.S. nonprofit organization

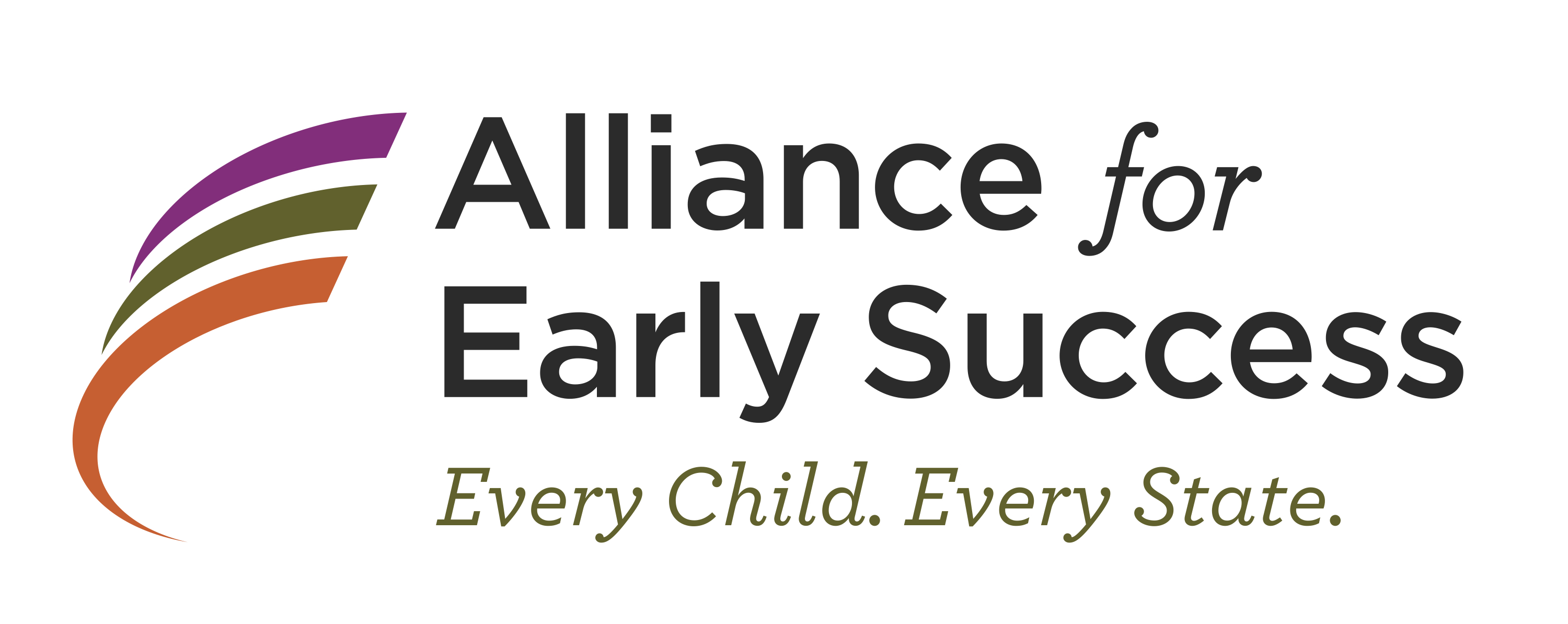
- Founded: 2005
- Legal status: 501(c)(3) non-profit
- Website: earlysuccess.org

The Alliance for Early Success (the Alliance) is a 50-state early-childhood advocacy nonprofit that provides connections, expertise, technical assistance, and targeted investments to help state policy advocates achieve pro-child state policies. Because many of the programs that contribute to early childhood development and success are administered by states, the Alliance focuses on connecting, equipping, and funding state advocates who push for policy that improves and scales early childhood success.

== History ==
In 2004, leaders at the Buffet Early Childhood Fund began to explore ways to act on the new learning that had been emerging on the importance of early childhood education and support. The organization developed a strategy to align early childhood practice, research, and policy across the country and founded the Birth to Five Policy Alliance in 2005. Buffett was soon joined by three additional major investors: Irving Harris Foundation, George Kaiser Family Foundation, and the J.B. and M.K. Pritzker Family Foundation.

Over the next decade, research on the science of brain development, child development, and economic return on investment increasingly showed that the kids farthest behind make the greatest gains when intervention and prevention start at birth and continue through age eight. As a result, in 2012, the Birth to Five Policy Alliance widened its focus to encompass birth through age eight and rebranded as the Alliance for Early Success.

The organization has become central to early childhood advocacy at the state level in the United States, and its funders today include the Bill & Melinda Gates Foundation, the Annie E. Casey Foundation, Ballmer Group, and the Robert Wood Johnson Foundation.

In 2023, the Alliance received a $10-million grant from philanthropist MacKenzie Scott.

== 50-State Alliance ==
The Alliance for Early Success focuses on state policies that can change the calculus for children 0-8 through legislative, regulatory, executive or budgetary actions. Structuring recommendations and advocating for these policies is most effectively done at the state level, because each state has in place a unique and complex set of laws, regulations, funding mechanisms, and governance arrangements that shape services and supports for young children and their families.

Today, the organization is the 50-state alliance of state-level advocates for early childhood education, health, and family supports. The Alliance makes targeted strategic financial investments in these state organizations and the national experts that support them. In addition, it hosts national meetings, convenes policy-specific learning communities, offers high-level technical assistance and rapid-response support, and connects state advocates with each other for crucial information exchange.

== Policy objectives ==
The Alliance for Early Success has developed a guiding "Birth Through Eight Policy Framework" that serves as a roadmap to guide state policy to improve opportunity for children in three areas: health, family support, and learning outcomes. The Framework features evidence-based, "best-bet" policy recommendations for each area. Alliance states set their own objectives in any given year, and the Alliance offers support for work that falls within the framework.

The Alliance for Early Success is particularly active on the issue of child care and is leading Child Care NEXT, a nationwide multi-organization grant program to support transformational change in a states' child-care systems. For Child Care NEXT, state teams of stakeholders come together to craft a comprehensive state proposal and commit to implementing it.
