= Journal of Labor and Society =

- Discipline: Political Economy, sociology
- Language: English
- Edited by: Immanuel Ness

Publication details
- Former name: WorkingUSA
- History: Since 1997
- Publisher: Brill Publishers
- Frequency: Quarterly
- Impact factor: 1.1 (2024)

Standard abbreviations
- ISO 4: J. Labor Soc.

Indexing
- ISSN: 2667-3657 (print); 2471-4607 (web)
- OCLC no.: 1347342006

Links
- Journal homepage; WorkingUSA archives from Brill (1997-2016); archives from Wiley (1997-2020)

The Journal of Labor and Society, formerly WorkingUSA: The Journal of Labor and Society, is a quarterly peer-reviewed academic journal published by Brill Publishers covering the political economy of labour, labor movements, and class relations throughout the world. It focuses on the current context and shape of capitalist social relations, business and corporations, labor relations, the working class and the labor unions in the Global South. The journal was established in 1997 and published by Wiley Periodicals through December 2020. In January 2021, the journal began publishing with Brill. The editor-in-chief is Immanuel Ness (City University of New York).

== Abstracting and indexing ==
The journal is abstracted and indexed by:

- Business ASAP
- Expanded Academic ASAP
- InfoTrac
- PAIS: Public Affairs Information Service
- Scopus
