= Kate Bronfenbrenner =

American labor union strategist (born 1954)

Kate Bronfenbrenner (born March 23, 1954) is an American labor historian who is the Director of Labor Education Research at the Cornell University School of Industrial and Labor Relations. She is a leading authority on successful strategies in labor union organizing, and on the effects of outsourcing and offshoring on workers and worker rights.

== Life and education ==
Bronfenbrenner was born in Ithaca, New York, in 1954. Her father was the noted developmental psychologist Urie Bronfenbrenner. Bronfenbrenner obtained a Bachelor of Science degree from Cornell University in 1976, and earned her doctorate from Cornell in 1993.

== Career ==
After earning her undergraduate degree, Bronfenbrenner worked as a welfare rights coordinator for the Fremont Public Association (a nonprofit human services delivery group) in Seattle from 1978 to 1979. She worked as a union organizer for the United Woodcutters Association in Mississippi from 1980 to 1981, and as a union field representative providing collective bargaining and contract administration for SEIU Local 285 (now part of 1199SEIU United Healthcare Workers East) in Boston from 1981 to 1986.

Her experience in the labor movement led her to seek a doctorate in labor studies at Cornell. She was appointed an adjunct instructor at Cornell's ILR Extension Division, teaching from 1986 to 1991. While writing her dissertation, Bronfenbrenner was appointed an assistant professor and Labor Education Coordinator in the Department of Labor Studies and Industrial Relations at Penn State University in 1991. Upon receipt of her Ph.D. in 1993, Bronfenbrenner left Penn State and was appointed director of labor education research at the Cornell ILR School in 1993.

== Research focus ==
Bronfenbrenner is a highly regarded expert on labor union organizing and collective bargaining strategies. She introduced rigorous statistical methodology and survey techniques to a field which had been dominated by case studies. Her most notable contribution in this regard were two papers. The first was the 1994 paper 'The Promise of Union Organizing in the Public and Private Sectors,' co-authored with Tom Juravich. In 1995, Bronfenbrenner and Juravich co-wrote a second work, 'Union Tactics Matter: The Impact of Union Tactics on Certification Elections, First Contracts, and Membership Rates.' Based on Bronfenbrenner's doctoral dissertation, the two papers were widely distributed throughout the labor movement and had a significant impact in promoting union organizing as a key issue in the 1995 AFL-CIO presidential race.

Bronfenbrenner is also well known for her studies of anti-union tactics utilized by employers in NLRB-sponsored union organizing elections. In 1995, Bronfenbrenner and Juravich co-wrote 'The Impact of Employer Opposition on Union Certification Win Rates: A Private/Public Sector Comparison.' Previously, individual labor unions—and, to a lesser extent, the AFL-CIO—had collected anecdotal evidence on employer anti-union tactics and strategies. Much of this work was kept secret, for fear that anti-union employers would realize that unions were learning how to respond and modify and improve their anti-union tactics accordingly. This 1995 paper, however, brought this research agenda into the open and made it a topic for academic discussion. The paper grouped and categorized anti-union tactics and strategies, and used surveys and statistical analysis to judge their effectiveness. This paper also had a galvanizing effect on the American labor movement, creating a behind-the-scenes cottage industry in analyzing anti-union consultants and anti-union organizing campaign tactics. The work of the AFL-CIO-affiliated organization, American Rights at Work, and its opposite number, the employer-financed Center for Union Facts, both stem from the emphasis on opposition research engendered by Bronfenbrenner's paper. Data cited in the paper was heavily relied on by proponents of the Employee Free Choice Act (EFCA). EFCA opponents dispute much of her statistical assertions, claiming that they are derived from uncorroborated reports of biased union organizers.

To a lesser extent, Bronfenbrenner conducted research and written on the impact of outsourcing and offshoring, and the effect they have on workers, wages, employment and unions in the United States and around the world. In 2006, Bronfenbrenner brought more than 550 trade unionists and scholars from 53 countries to discuss union initiatives in strategic corporate research, global organizing and global collective bargaining campaigns; exchange research on the changing nature of multinational corporate ownership and governance structures, human resources practices, and business strategies; and to discuss ways in which labor unions and academics could work together to enhance their understanding of multinational corporations. Bronfenbrenner's best-known work is mostly likely Ravenswood: The Steelworkers' Victory and the Revival of American Labor, co-authored with Tom Juravich.

== Awards and memberships ==
Bronfenbrenner was tapped to deliver the Rogin Lectureship at the George Meany Center for Labor Studies in 1994. In 1998, the Labor Party named her the recipient of its first-ever Karen Silkwood Award. In 1999, the Industrial Relations Research Association gave her their Young Scholar Award.

Bronfenbrenner is an editorial board member of New Labor Forum, a journal of labor studies published by Queens College, and Labor Studies Journal, a multi-disciplinary publication about workers and labor organizations published by the United Association for Labor Education and West Virginia University

Bronfenbrenner is a member of the United Association for Labor Education (formed by the merger of Workers' Education Local 189, Communications Workers of America, AFL-CIO, and the University and College Labor Educators Association), and the Industrial Relations Research Association.

== Published works ==
Studies done by Kate Bronfenbrenner at Cornell University showed the adverse effect of plants threatening to move to Mexico because of NAFTA.

=== Solely authored works ===
- 'The American Labor Movement and the Resurgence in Union Organizing.' In Trade Union Renewal and Organizing: A Comparative Study of Trade Union Movements in Five Countries. Peter Fairbrother and Charlotte Yates, eds. London: Cassell Academic, 2002.
- 'Changing to Organize.' The Nation. 273:7 (September 13, 2001).
- 'Employer Behavior in Certification Elections and First Contracts: Implications for Labor Law Reform.' In Restoring the Promise of American Labor Law. Sheldon Friedman, Richard Hurd, Rudy Oswald and Ronald Seeber, eds. Ithaca N.Y.: ILR Press, 1994. ISBN 0-87546-326-6
- 'The Evolution of Strategic and Coordinated Bargaining Campaigns in the 1990s: The Steelworkers' Experience.' In Rekindling the Movement: Labor's Quest for Relevance in the 21st Century. Lowell Turner, Harry C. Katz, and Richard W. Hurd, eds. Ithaca, N.Y.: ILR Press, 2001. ISBN 0-8014-8712-9
- Finale Report: The Effects of Plant Closing or Threat of Plant Closing on the Right of Workers to Organize. Secretariat of the Commission for Labor Cooperation. Dallas, Tex.: Bernan Press, 1997.
- 'Organizing Women: The Nature and Process of Union Organizing Efforts among U.S. Women Workers since the mid-1990s.' Work and Occupations. 32:4 (November 2005).
- 'The Role of Union Strategies in NLRB Certification Elections.' Industrial and Labor Relations Review. 50:2 (January, 1997).

=== Co-authored works ===
- Bronfenbrenner, Kate and Hickey, Rob. Blueprint for Change: A National Assessment of Winning Union Organizing Strategies. Ithaca, N.Y.: Cornell Office of Labor Education Research, 2003.
- Bronfenbrenner, Kate and Hickey, Rob. 'Changing to Organize: A National Assessment of Union Organizing Strategies.' In Rebuilding Labor: Organizing and Organizers in the New Union Movement. Ruth Milkman and Kim Voss, eds. Ithaca, N.Y.: ILR Press, 2004. ISBN 0-8014-8902-4
- Bronfenbrenner, Kate and Juravich, Tom. 'The Impact of Employer Opposition on Union Certification Win Rates: A Private/Public Sector Comparison.' Working paper no. 113, Economic Policy Institute, Washington, D.C. 1995.
- Bronfenbrenner, Kate and Juravich, Tom. 'Introduction: Bringing the Study of Work Back to Labor Studies.' Labor Studies Journal. 30:1 (Spring 2005).
- Bronfenbrenner, Kate and Juravich, Tom. 'Out of the Ashes: The Steelworkers' Global Campaign at Bridgestone/Firestone.' In Multinational Companies and Global Human Resource Strategies. William N. Cooke, ed. Westport, Conn.: Praeger Publishers, 2003. ISBN 1-56720-583-6
- Bronfenbrenner, Kate and Juravich, Tom. The Promise of Union Organizing in the Public and Private Sectors. Working paper, Institute for the Study of Labor Organizations, George Meany Center for Labor Studies, Silver Spring, Md. 1994.
- Bronfenbrenner, Kate and Juravich, Tom. Ravenswood: The Steelworkers' Victory and the Revival of American Labor. Ithaca, N.Y.: Cornell University Press/ILR Press, 1999. ISBN 0-8014-8666-1
- Bronfenbrenner, Kate and Juravich, Tom. 'Significant Victories.' In Justice on the Job. Richard N. Block, Sheldon Friedman, Michelle Kaminski and Andy Levin, eds. Kalamazoo, Mich.: W.E. Upjohn Institute for Employment Research, 2006. ISBN 0-88099-278-6
- Bronfenbrenner, Kate and Juravich, Tom. Staying Union: The Dynamics of Union Success in Public Sector Decertification Campaigns. Washington, D.C.: AFL-CIO, 1995.
- Bronfenbrenner, Kate and Juravich, Tom. Union Organizing in the Public Sector: An Analysis of State and Local Elections. Ithaca, N.Y.: ILR Press, 1995. ISBN 0-87546-347-9
- Bronfenbrenner, Kate and Juravich, Tom. 'Union Tactics Matter: The Impact of Union Tactics on Certification Elections, First Contracts, and Membership Rates.' Working paper, Institute for the Study of Labor Organizations, George Meany Center for Labor Studies, Silver Spring, Md. 1995.
- Rashke, Richard L. and Bronfenbrenner, Kate. The Killing of Karen Silkwood: The Story Behind the Kerr-McGee Plutonium Case. 2d ed. Ithaca, N.Y.: Cornell University Press, 2000. ISBN 0-8014-8667-X

=== Co-edited works ===
- Organizing to Win: New Research on Union Strategies. Kate Bronfenbrenner, Sheldon Friedman, Richard W. Hurd, Rudolph A. Oswald and Ronald L. Seeber, eds. Ithaca, N.Y.: ILR Press, 1998. ISBN 0-8014-8446-4
