= Steven Attewell =

American author, blogger, and policy historian

Steven Attewell was an author, policy historian, and Adjunct Assistant Professor of Public Policy at CUNY's Murphy Institute for Labor Studies. He was best known for his blog Race for the Iron Throne, which covered the historical and political side of George R. R. Martin's A Song of Ice and Fire and HBO's Game of Thrones, for which he published several books on the series.

== Career ==
Attewell started off as an undergraduate history major at Columbia and then went into the history PhD program at UC Santa Barbara, where he wrote his dissertation Public At Work: Direct Job Creation Policy From The New Deal to the Rise of Reagan. This became his book People Must Live by Work, which traces "the rise and fall of direct job creation by the government as federal economic and social policy." People Must Live by Work has been cited by other works, such as Eric Rauchway's Why the New Deal Matters and Kate Aronoff's Overheated: How Capitalism Broke the Planet--And How We Fight Back.

From 2009 to 2013, he worked as a freelance policy analyst for the New America Foundation. He received the Patricia and John Klingenstein Short-Term Fellowship from the New York Historical Society in 2014 for his project "The Tammany Tiger in an Era of Mass Unemployment." Starting in 2014, he began working as an Adjunct Assistant Professor at CUNY's Murphy Institute for Labor Studies, where he taught Urban Studies.

In March 2012, he began writing the blog Race for the Iron Throne, which was dedicated to doing a chapter-by-chapter analysis of A Song of Ice and Fire and an episode-by-episode analysis of Game of Thrones. He also wrote frequent guest essays for the blog Tower of the Hand and for the blogs Lawyers, Guns & Money and Graphic Policy, where he wrote a series of articles titled "The People's History of the Marvel Universe" and co-hosted an episode-by-episode podcast about The Venture Bros. He also co-founded The Realignment Project, a group blog dedicated to discussing "current political events, political strategy, ideology, and history."

In 2014, he wrote articles about Game of Thrones for Esquire, including ones comparing the characters to their historical counterparts and discussing the controversial rape scene in "Breaker of Chains," and in 2015, he wrote articles about the fifth season of Game of Thrones for Salon.com.

In October 2024, journalist and author Spencer Ackerman confirmed that he included Steven in his first issue of Iron Man as a tribute.

== Personal life ==
Attewell's parents are Katherine S. Newman and Paul Attewell and he has one brother, David Attewell. Attewell dealt with cancer on-and-off for years and lost a leg to it. He died of complications due to the cancer in April 2024.

One of his ancestors, Adam Attewell, had joined John Ball's Great Society and was executed for rebellion against the crown.

== Bibliography ==
=== Non-fiction Books ===
- Race for the Iron Throne: Political and Historical Analysis of "A Game of Thrones". First published through Kindle in 2014, then paperback in 2018. ISBN 978-1980635932.
- Hands, Kings, & City-States: Analyzing a World of Ice and Fire. Self-published through Kindle in 2015, then in paperback in 2019. ISBN 978-1723898655.
- Race for the Iron Throne, Vol. II: Political and Historical Analysis of "A Clash of Kings". Self-published in two parts through Kindle in 2016, then paperback in 2018. ISBN 978-1973464488.
- People Must Live by Work: Direct Job Creation in America, from FDR to Reagan (Politics and Culture in Modern America). University of Pennsylvania Press, 2018. ISBN 978-0812250435.
- The American Middle Class: An Economic Encyclopedia of Progress and Poverty [2 volumes]. Co-wrote the article "The Origins of the Middle Class." Greenwood, 2017. ISBN 978-1610697576.

=== Articles ===
- "Obama's Health-Care Gamble: History Is on His Side," Chronicle of Higher Education, April 11, 2010, with Katherine Newman.
- "'No Business [That Pays Less Than a Living Wage]…Has Any Right to Continue'—Changing Rhetorics of the Minimum Wage," 1933–1981, Society, January 17, 2022.
