= Tom Juravich =

American academic and musician

Tom Juravich is a professor of Labor Studies at the University of Massachusetts Amherst.

Juravich is also a musician and labor movement activist.

== Education and career ==
Juravich, a former mechanic, received a Ph.D. in sociology in 1983 from the University of Massachusetts Amherst.

From 1984 to 1993 he was an assistant and associate professor in the Department of Labor Studies at Penn State University where he also directed a workers' education program for wage-earners in the Philadelphia area.

In 1993, Juravich was appointed as an associate professor of labor studies at UMass Amherst, being full professor in 1997. He was director of the UMass Amherst Labor Center from 1997-2006 and 2016-2018.

== Research focus ==
Tom Juravich studies work, workers and the labor movement. As an ethnographer, his exploration of the labor process began with his participant observation as a machine mechanic in a New England wire mill which was published in his first book, Chaos on the Shop Floor: A Worker's View of Quality, Productivity and Management. Despite the degradation and segmentation of work, he found that workers retained more (unrecognized) skills than many had suggested. He continued his work on the labor process with At the Altar of the Bottom Line: The Degradation of Work in the 21st Century that explores the work of nurses, call center representatives, industrial workers, as well as undocumented workers in the fish processing industry. Juravich returned to exploring the complex ways that workers' skills persist in his "Artifacts of Workers Knowledge: Finding Skill in the Closing and Restructuring of a Furniture Manufacturer" in Ethnography. He is currently researching wage theft and the work of undocumented workers in residential construction and is part of an NSF grant exploring the impact of artificial intelligence and computer-based technology on the future of work.

Juravich's research on the labor movement focuses on organizing and strategic campaigns. His quantitative research with Kate Bronfenbrenner on organizing documented the importance of grassroots rank-and-file tactics for successful organizing in both the private and public sector. Beginning with his Ravenswood: The Steelworkers' Victory and the Revival of American Labor on the Steelworkers' (with Kate Bronfenbrenner) he had also written extensively about union strategic campaigns. His chapter "Beating Global Capital: A Framework and Method for Union Strategic Corporate Research and Campaigns," pioneered an approach to strategic corporate research and campaigns and is widely cited and utilized in the labor movement. Building on this approach Juravich created and is the webmaster for www.StrategicCorporateResearch.org a comprehensive website for conducting corporate research in the U.S. and Canada. He teaches strategic corporate research and campaigns to a variety of union, community and environmental groups.

Juravich continues to write about the contemporary labor movement in recent articles, including "Constituting Challenges in Differing Arenas of Power: Workers' Centers, the Fight for $15 and Union Organizing." He also builds on his work in labor history and union culture that he began with Commonwealth of Toil: Chapters in the History of Massachusetts Workers and Their Unions (with Jim Green and William Hartford) with his recent "Bread and Roses: The Evolution of a Song, Labor Songbooks, and Union Culture." He is also co-editor with his colleagues at the UMass Labor Center of Labor in the Time of Trump.

== Musical works ==
Juravich has produced five recordings of labor and roots music. His first album, Rising Again, was produced by the United Auto Workers. His 1989 A World to Win and the 1991 Songs from the Film Out of Darkness: The Mine Workers Story (produced by Academy Award Winner Barbara Kopple) were released on Flying Fish Records. Juravich's latest CDs and Tangled in Our Dreams (with Teresa Healy) (2006) and, (2007) were released by Finnegan Music.

== Published works ==
=== Solely authored books ===
- Chaos on the Shop Floor: A Worker's View of Quality, Productivity, and Management. Reprint ed. Philadelphia: Temple University Press, 1988. ISBN 0-87722-561-3
- Juravich, Tom (ed.). 2007. The Future of Work in Massachusetts. Amherst, MA: University of Massachusetts Press, 2007. ISBN 978-1-55849-607-1
- Juravich, Tom. 2009. At the Altar of the Bottom Line: The Degradation of Work in the Twentieth Century. Amherst, MA: University of Massachusetts Press, 2009. ISBN 1558497250

=== Co-authored books ===
- Juravich, Tom; Hartford, William; and Green, James. Commonwealth of Toil: Chapters in the History of Massachusetts Workers and Their Unions. Amherst, Mass.: University of Massachusetts Press, 1996. ISBN 1-55849-046-9
- Juravich, Tom and Kate Brofenbrenner. Ravenswood: The Steelworkers' Victory and the Revival of American Labor. Ithaca, N.Y.: Cornell University Press/ILR Press, 1999. ISBN 0-8014-8666-1
- Kerrissey, Jasmine, Eve Weinbaum, Clare Hammonds, Tom Juravich and Dan Clawson (equal contributions). 2019. Labor in the Time of Trump. Ithaca, NY: ILR/Cornell University Press. ISBN 150174660X

=== Solely authored articles ===
- 2007. "Beating Global Capital: A Framework and Method for Union Strategic Corporate Research and Campaigns," in Kate Bronfenbrenner (ed.), Global Unions: Challenging Global Capital through Cross-Border Campaigns. Ithaca, NY: ILR/Cornell University Press, 16–39. ISBN 9780801473913
- 2011. "Representing Labor: Labor Posters and the American Labor Movement," Work and Occupations, Vol. 38, No. 2 (March), 143–148. doi:10.1177/073088841140
- 2013. "Tacit Skills," in Vicki Smith (ed.), Sociology of Work: An Encyclopedia. New York: Sage. ISBN 9781452276199
- 2016. "A Year To Remember," New Labor Forum, Vol. 2 (May), 80-87. doi:10.1177/1095796016639300
- 2017. "Artifacts of Workers' Knowledge: Finding Skill in the Closing and Restructuring of a Furniture Manufacturer," Ethnography, Vol 18 (4), 493-514. JSTOR 26359201
- 2017. "Fight for $15: The Limits of Symbolic Power," Labor Studies Journal, Vol. 42(4), 394-398. doi:10.1177/0160449X17742796
- 2018. "Constituting Challenges in Differing Arenas of Power: Workers' Centers, the Fight for $15 and Union Organizing," Labor Studies Journal, Vol. 43 (2), 104-117. doi:10.1177/0160449X18763441
- 2020. "Bread and Roses: The Evolution of a Song, Labor Songbooks, and Union Culture," Labor: Studies in Working-Class History, Vol. 17 (2), 81-99. doi:10.1215/15476715-8114769

=== Co-authored articles ===
- Bronfenbrenner, Kate and Juravich, Tom. Union Organizing in the Public Sector: An Analysis of State and Local Elections. Ithaca, N.Y.: ILR Press, 1995. ISBN 0-87546-347-9
- Bronfenbrenner, Kate, and Tom Juravich. 1998. "It Takes More Than House Calls: Organizing to Win with a Comprehensive Union-Building Strategy" in Kate Bronfenbrenner et al. (eds.), Organizing to Win, Ithaca, NY: ILR/Cornell University Press, 19–36. ISBN 9780801484469
- Juravich, Tom, and Kate Bronfenbrenner. 1998. "Preparing for the Worst: Organizing and Staying Organized in a Changing Public Sector Climate," in Kate Bronfenbrenner et al. (eds.), Organizing to Win, Ithaca, NY: ILR/Cornell University Press, 261–282.
- Bronfenbrenner, Kate and Juravich, Tom. "Significant Victories." In Justice on the Job. Richard N. Block, Sheldon Friedman, Michelle Kaminski and Andy Levin, eds. Kalamazoo, Mich.: W.E. Upjohn Institute for Employment Research, 2006. ISBN 0-88099-278-6
- Bronfenbrenner, Kate and Juravich, Tom. 'Out of the Ashes: The Steelworkers' Global Campaign at Bridgestone/Firestone.' In Multinational Companies and Global Human Resource Strategies. William N. Cooke, ed. Westport, Conn.: Quorum Books, 2003. ISBN 9781567205831
- Juravich, Tom, and Corinn Williams. 2011. "After the Immigration Raid: Evaluating the Campaign to Support Undocumented Workers in New Bedford, Massachusetts," Working USA, Vol. 14, No 2 (June), 201–224. doi:10.1111/j.1743-4580.2011.00333.x
- Juravich, Tom, Dan Dashnaw, Andrea Greenberg, and Nate Johnson. 2014. "How a Strike Was Won: Rebuilding Union Capacity and Strategic Leverage in a Utility Workers Local," Labor Studies Journal, Vol. 39, No. 3 (September), 202-222. doi:10.1177/0160449X14542521

=== Musical works ===
- Rising Again. LP, United Auto Workers, 1980.
- A World to Win. Audio CD. Flying Fish Records, 1989.
- Out Of Darkness: The Mine Worker's Story. Soundtrack to the motion picture. Audio CD. Flying Fish Records, 1991.
- Altar of the Bottom Line. Audio CD. Finnegan Music, 2007
- Tangled in Our Dreams. (with Teresa Healy). Audio CD. Finnegan Music, 2006.
