= Center for an Urban Future =

American public policy think tank

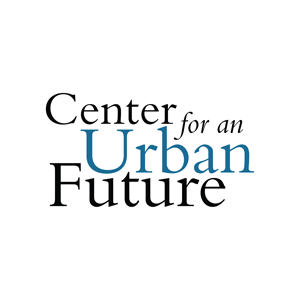
Center for an Urban Future

== Center for an Urban Future ==
The Center for an Urban Future (CUF) is a nonpartisan public policy think tank based in New York City. Founded in 1996, the organization focuses on expanding economic opportunity and reducing inequality through independent research and policy recommendations. CUF is known for publishing accessible, action-oriented reports on topics such as workforce development, higher education, immigrant and low-income entrepreneurship, the innovation economy, and social infrastructure including public libraries and parks.

=== History ===
CUF was established in 1996 as an offshoot of City Limits, a nonprofit news magazine covering housing and urban policy. In 2009, CUF became fully independent.

The organization is headquartered in Manhattan and operates as a program of City Futures, Inc., a 501(c)(3) nonprofit. As of 2024, CUF had a full-time staff of seven, along with visiting fellows and interns.

=== Leadership ===
CUF has been led since 2010 by Executive Director Jonathan Bowles. The organization's editorial and policy director is Eli Dvorkin, who oversees CUF’s publication strategy and research agenda.

=== Research and Impact ===
CUF has been credited with influencing several major city policies. A 2007 report on immigrant entrepreneurship helped prompt the Bloomberg administration to launch new initiatives supporting immigrant-owned businesses. A 2011 report on the city’s design sector led to the creation of NYCxDesign, an annual festival launched by the City Council.

In 2022, CUF proposed a program to help New Yorkers who left college return to complete their degrees. The idea became the basis for CUNY Reconnect, which the City Council launched later that year with $4 million in funding. By 2024, the program had re-enrolled more than 42,000 students and helped over 6,000 earn degrees.

A 2022 CUF report also highlighted entrepreneurial potential among New York City Housing Authority (NYCHA) residents. The findings helped spur the creation of NYC Boss Up, a city initiative funded by the Moelis Family Foundation to provide grants to public housing residents starting businesses.

In 2025, CUF's research sparked a proposal for a Minority Business Accelerator, aimed at supporting minority-owned businesses. The initiative was announced during City Council Speaker Adrienne Adams’ State of the City address.

Also in 2025, CUF published a report titled 5 Ideas for Retaining New York City’s Young Families, proposing policies to make the city more affordable for families with children. The report received media coverage from NY1 and other outlets.

CUF’s work is regularly cited by elected officials and media outlets, including The New York Times, Wall Street Journal, Crain’s New York Business, Daily News, and WNYC.

=== Funding and Governance ===
CUF is funded through private foundations and philanthropic support and does not accept government funding. Major funders have included the Altman Foundation, Fisher Brothers Foundation, and JPMorgan Chase Foundation. Its board of directors includes leaders from organizations such as Goldman Sachs, NYU, the MTA, and Bloomberg Philanthropies.

CUF maintains an integrity and independence policy that prohibits accepting funding for research that would financially benefit donors or compromise the organization's mission.
