= CUNY School of Professional Studies =

Public university in New York City, New York

- Established: 2003
- Dean: Dr. Lisa Braverman
- Students: 4,200
- Location: 119 W. 31st Street, New York, New York, United States; 40.748386°N 73.990085°W
- Website: sps.cuny.edu
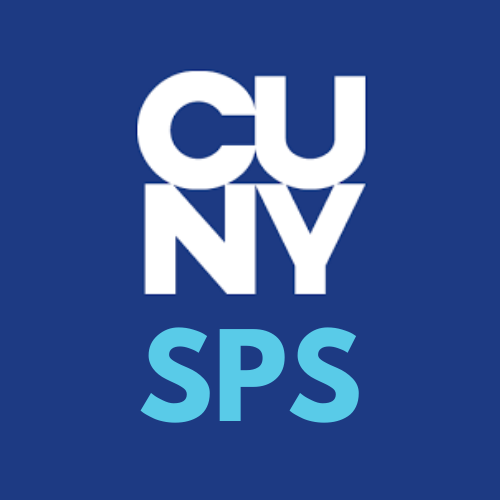

The CUNY School of Professional Studies (CUNY SPS) is a four-year college and part of the CUNY Graduate Center within the City University of New York (CUNY) system.

== History ==
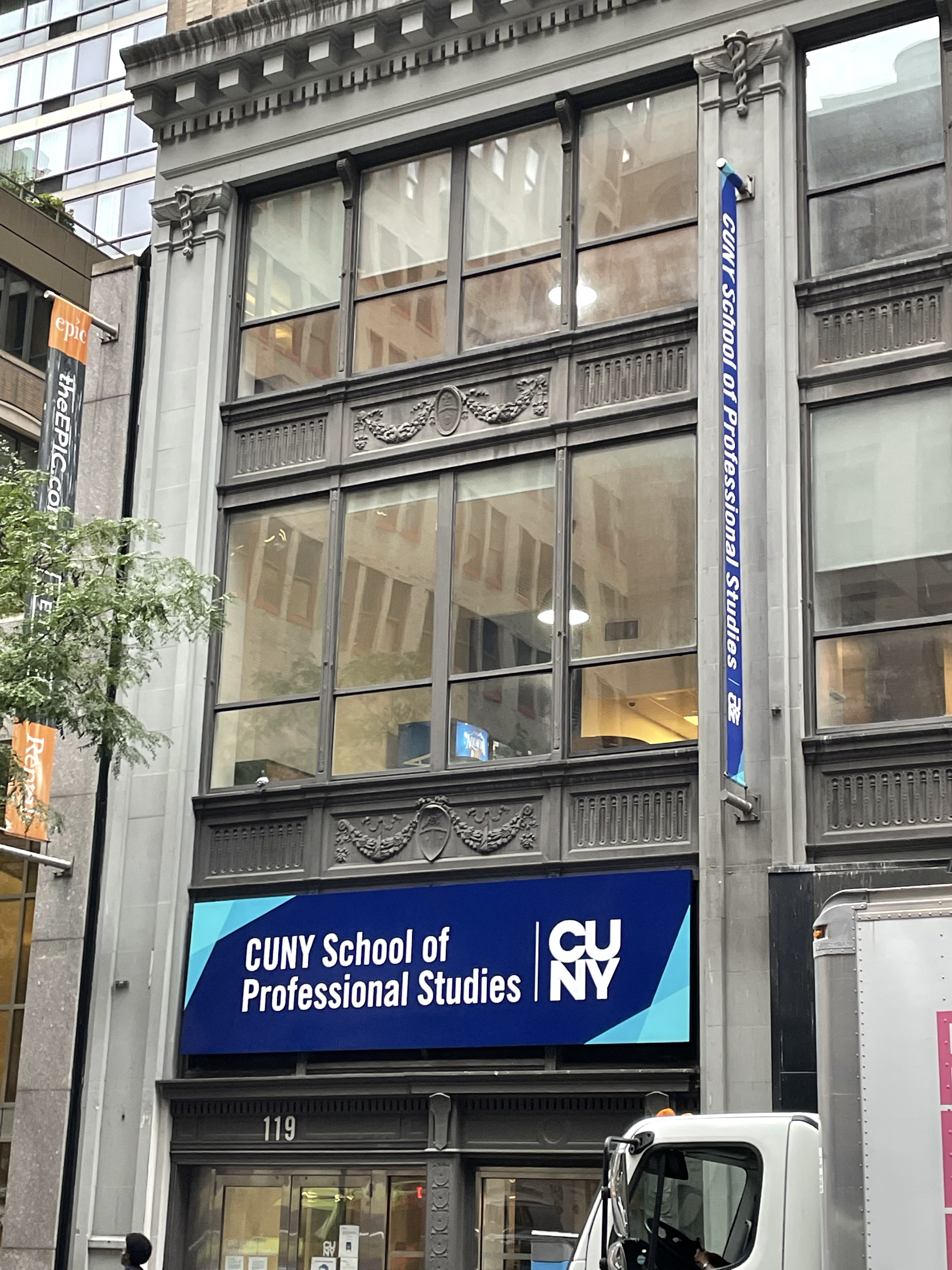
CUNY SPS campus at 119 W. 31st Street, NYC

In June of 2003, Neil Kleiman, then-director of the Center for an Urban Future, addressed the Board of Trustees of the City University of New York detailing the need for creating the CUNY School of Professional Studies (CUNY SPS).

In 2013, CUNY SPS opened its principal campus in midtown Manhattan, at the former site of the Gimbels department store.

In the twenty years since its founding, CUNY SPS became CUNY’s first and leading campus to offer fully online degree programs at both the bachelor's and master's level.

== Rankings ==
The School's online programs have consistently been ranked among the top in the nation. As of 2026, the U.S. News & World Report named CUNY SPS #9 on their list of Best Online Bachelor’s Programs, which assessed 359 schools. CUNY SPS is the highest online Bachelor's in New York City.

Additionally, the School was recognized with a #4 ranking on the publisher’s 2026 list of Best Online Bachelor’s Programs for Veterans, and the Psychology BA earned a #7 ranking.

== Programs ==
The following list contains some of the CUNY School of Professional Studies programs that have been registered with the New York State Education Department (NYSED) under the CUNY Graduate School and University Center and assigned HEGIS code numbers in compliance with State requirements.

- An online bachelor's in psychology that has been ranked #7 in the nation on the 2026 list of Best Online Bachelor’s Programs in Psychology by U.S. News & World Report.
- Other online bachelor's degrees include business, communication and media, disability studies, health information management, sociology (the sociology bachelor's is ranked in top 5 nationwide by U.S. News & World Report), and more.
- The nursing bachelor's and the master's degrees are additionally accredited by the Commission on Collegiate Nursing Education.
- Master's degrees in youth studies with fully online master's degrees in data analytics, business management, disability studies, disability services in higher education, psychology and more.
- Advanced certificate courses in a variety of areas, including project management, immigration law, and healthcare administration.
- Customized training programs for government agencies, unions, and nonprofit organizations

== Notable Alumni ==
Phara Souffrant Forrest (BS Nursing '20): assembly member for the New York's 57th State Assembly District

Vijah Ramjattan (MS Research and Compliance '26): Government of New York City, Office for the Prevention of Hate Crimes Executive Director
