= Norman K. Risjord =

American historian (1931–2019)

- Born: November 25, 1931; Manitowoc, Wisconsin
- Died: January 31, 2019 (aged 87)
- Occupations: Professor, writer

Norman K. Risjord (November 25, 1931 – January 31, 2019) was an American professor, historian and author of early American history and the early history of the northern Midwest states. Risjord was a teacher at the University of Wisconsin for more than 30 years. Most of his research and writing was devoted to early American history involving the birth and development of political parties that emerged after the American Revolution to which he committed six separate volumes. His works also include Thomas Jefferson, Jeffersonian political thought, its influence in government, and the political parties before and during War of 1812. He has also written extensively on these topics in various historical journals. Several of Risjord's works are widely considered as the standard authority on the early American history of the U.S. party system. Risjord was twice awarded the Fulbright Lectureship, an international award given to distinguished professors.

== Early life and education ==
Risjord was born in Manitowoc, Wisconsin on November 25, 1931, and was raised in Kansas City, Missouri. In Virginia he attended the College of William and Mary from 1949 to 1953, where he was elected to the Phi Beta Kappa society (Note: Founded in 1776, Phi Beta Kappa is the oldest academic honor society in the United States.) in his junior year. He was also a three-year letterman on the university's swimming team. Risjord served in the Counterintelligence Corps in Berlin, 1954 to 1956. Thereafter he resumed his education at the University of Virginia where he earned his History Ph.D. in 1960. He then pursued a career as an author, lecturer, a host on Wisconsin NPR educational radio, and popular educator. His first scholarly focus produced many works in the early history of American government.

== Career ==
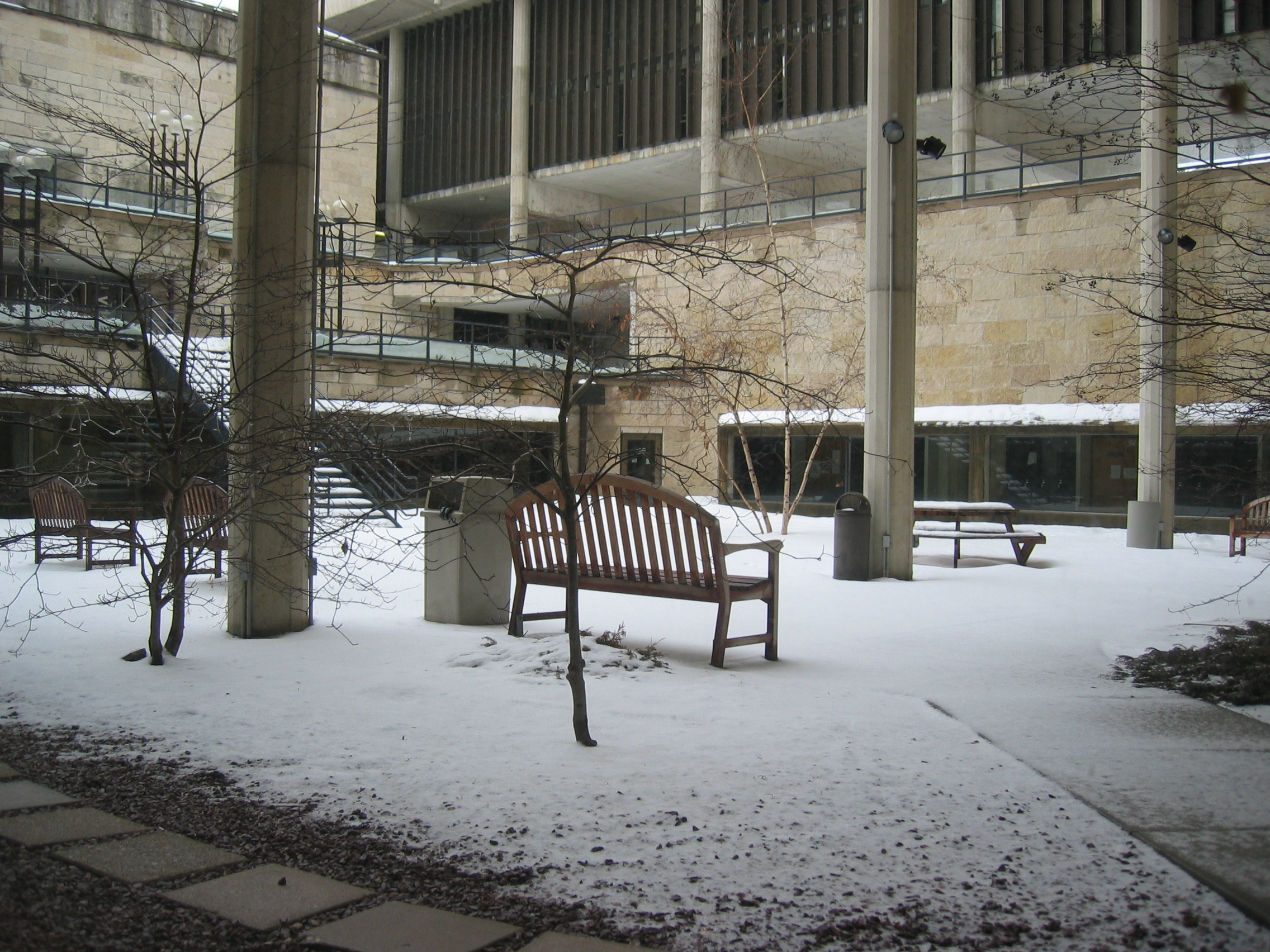
Mosse Building Courtyard used by History faculty

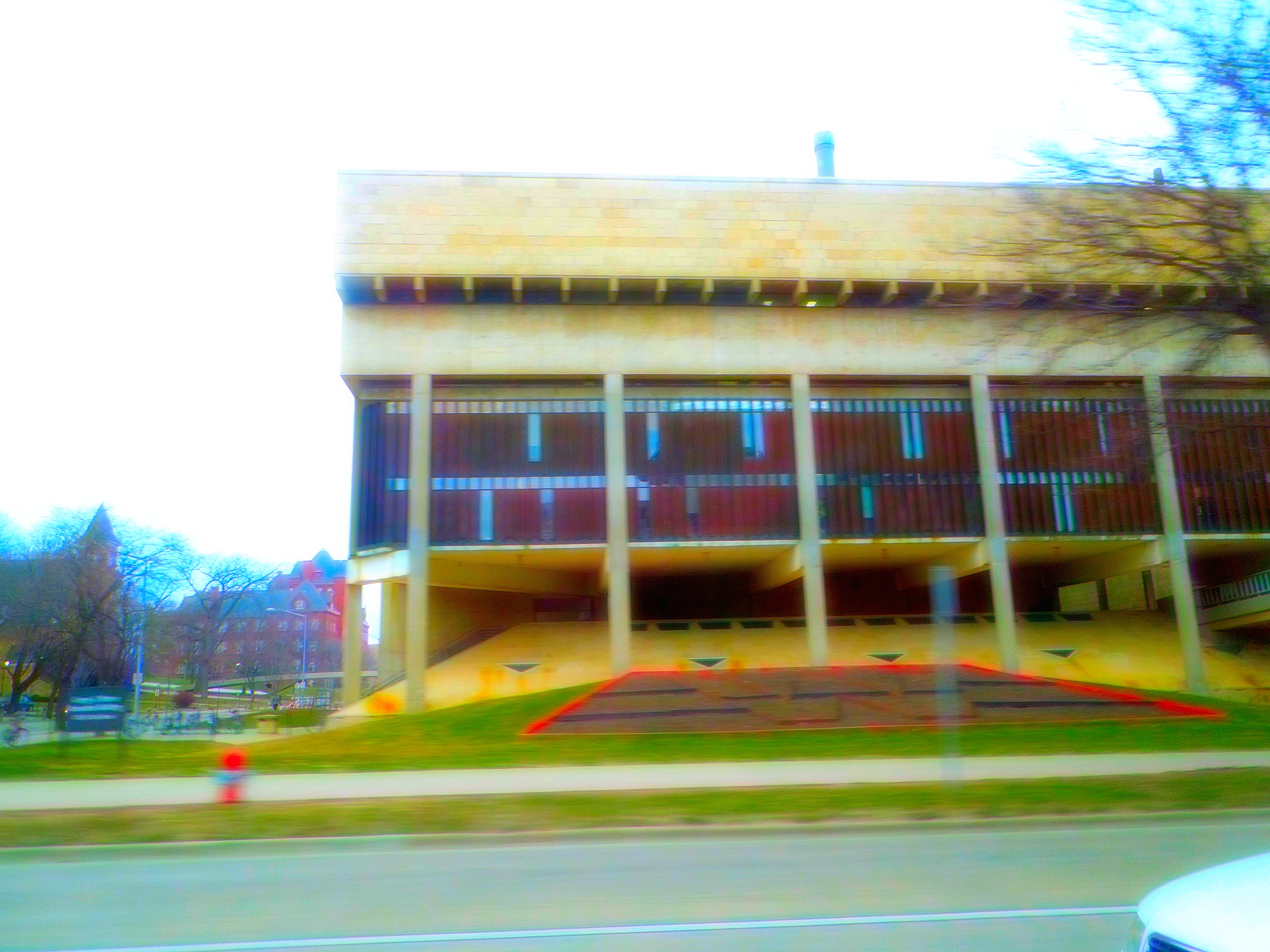
Mosse Humanities Building
U. Wisconsin-Madison

Risjord first began teaching at DePauw University in Greencastle, Indiana. In 1964, he became a member of the history faculty at the University of Wisconsin–Madison, and was soon appointed a professor of history. There he lectured in the George L. Mosse Humanities Building, where his lectures won him the Kiekhofer Award as "best teacher" for his first year on campus. Subsequently, his tenure spanned more than thirty years.

In 1966 Risjord was a visiting professor at Columbia University. Then, following the "Wisconsin Idea", in 1967 he began broadcasting his classroom lectures over NPR Wisconsin Public Radio, furthering the university's commitment to contribute to the education of every household in the state of Wisconsin. These continued periodically until 1989.

Risjord was awarded a Fulbright Lectureship at the university in Uppsala, Sweden in 1967–1968, an international academic award given to distinguished professors. (Note: The Fulbright Lectureship is sponsored by the Bureau of Educational and Cultural Affairs of the U.S. Department of State and receives funding from the United States Congress via annual appropriation bills.) He returned to teach American history at the University of Wisconsin–Madison until four years later, when he became a visiting lecturer at Dundee, Scotland, 1973 to 1974. Risjord served on the committee of the Southern Historical Association in 1974–1975, which oversaw the association's programs and new developments.

In 1978 Risjord wrote his second research book, Chesapeake Politics, 1780-1800, a study of the evolution of political parties in Maryland, Virginia, and North Carolina. In 1979, Risjord wrote a textbook on American History for use in secondary schools. In 1984 he wrote a college-level textbook titled America: A History of the United States published by Prentice Hall.

For the next decade, Risjord remained lecturing at the Madison campus, until he was again the recipient of a Fulbright Scholar Lectureship, this time to Singapore in 1983–1984. On his return to Wisconsin, Risjord taught for five consecutive years until a year spent as visiting lecturer as a professor of history at the U.S. Naval Academy between 1989 and 1990. During much of his tenure at Wisconsin University he was a member its department of history. He taught a final three years on the Madison campus to finish out his 30-year career before retiring from university lecturing. Risjord retired from Wisconsin University in 1993, with the title Professor Emeritus of History. In retirement, Risjord continued to write history, while applying his teaching and academic skills to volunteer work under PLATO (Participatory Learning and Teaching Organization). He continued in that role for more than two decades, until several months before his death. His teaching career lasted more than 60 years.

=== Academia ===
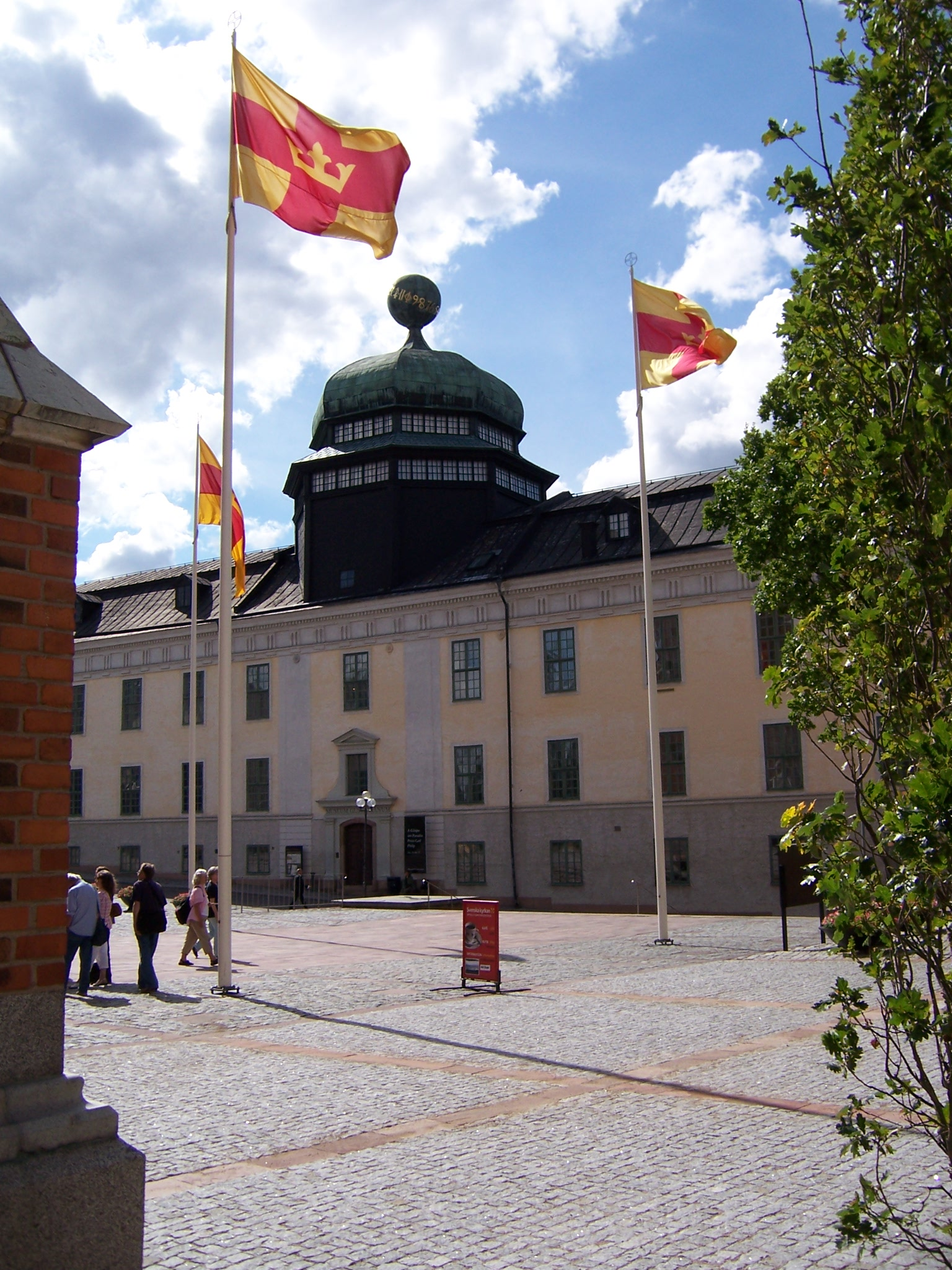
Risjord’s Lectureships:
Uppsala U., Sweden (here)
National U. of Singapore

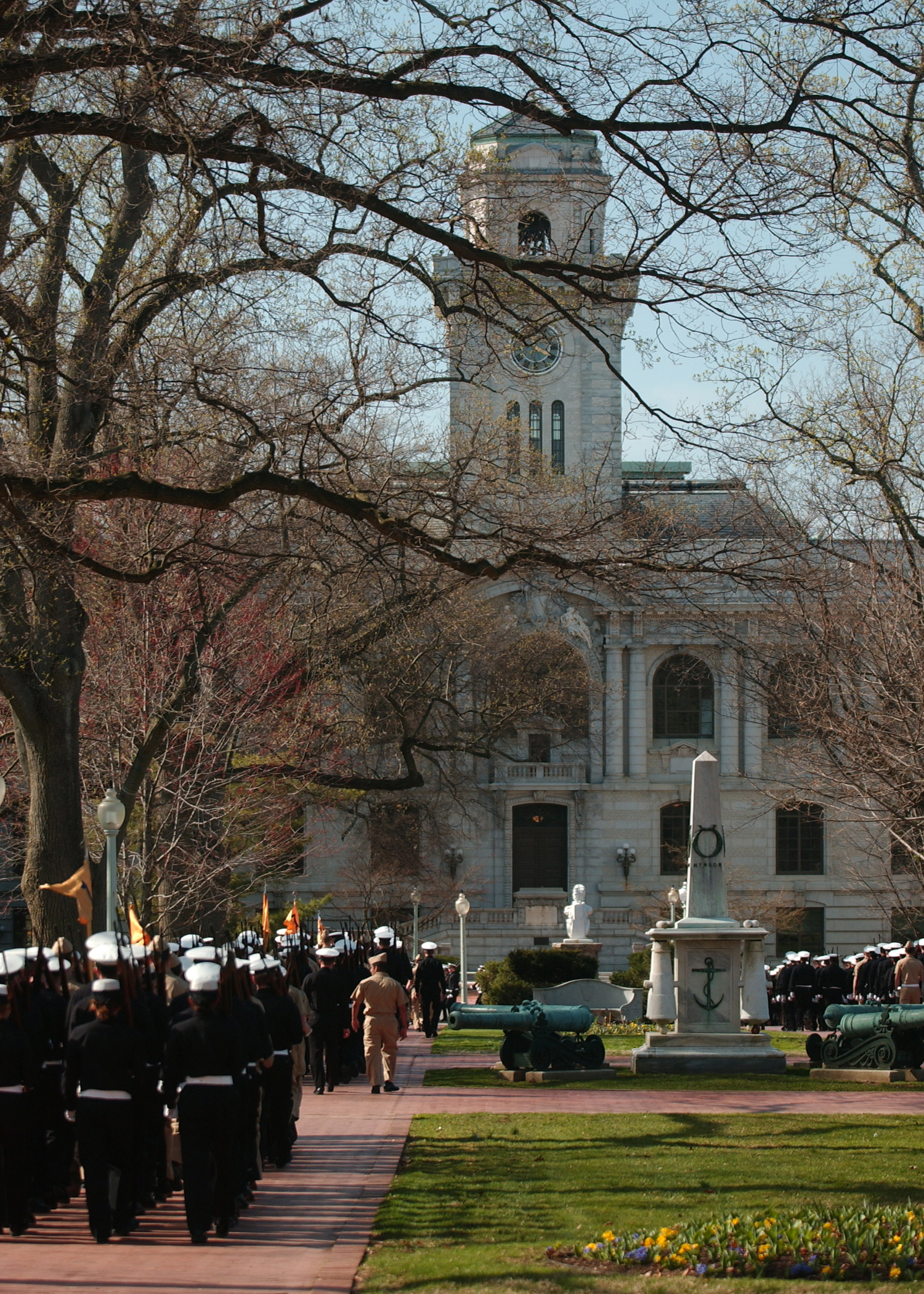
Risjord as visiting lecturer:
USNA (here), Columbia U.
& University of Dundee

Risjord's studies into on the early American party system were extensive and his subsequent works are often noted. Historian Donald R. Hickey notes that his writings about the Republicans in Early American political history are considered standard works on the subject. Risjord's works in this area include, The Old Republicans (1965), also considered a standard work on the early Republicans, Southern Conservatism in the Age of Jefferson (1965); The Virginia Federalists (1967); Early American Party System (1969); The Evolution of Political Parties in Virginia, 1782-1800 (1974). Hickey maintains that the best study of the 1812 United States presidential election is Risjord's "Election of 1812."

Risjord's writings over the years have appeared in several major historical journals, including The American Historical Review, Political Science Quarterly, the William and Mary Quarterly and The Journal of American History.

== Post university life ==
Risjord's teaching career lasted a total of 60 years. Upon his retirement he began writing books on US history for general readers. His first works were biographical studies that grew out of a course he taught at the university, "Representative Americans". The work evolved into six volumes, covering the biographies from the Colonial Period to the twentieth century. After that, he took an interest in the history of the upper Midwest, publishing the histories of Wisconsin, Minnesota, the Dakotas, and Lake Superior. Risjord had written over twenty books on American History before he died on January 31, 2019.

After his retirement in 1993, Risjord taught as a volunteer instructor for Wisconsin University-affiliated PLATO (Participatory Learning and Teaching Organization), part of the Division of Continuing Studies of the University of Wisconsin–Madison, and is dedicated to promote self-directed learning for Madison residents nearing retirement. His first classes were in a classroom holding 20 students, then he attracted more students to fill the lecture hall at Madison Senior Center, Capitol Lakes, and finally he filled the 200-seat Oakwood Village West auditorium.

Risjord was survived by his wife, Connie, his brother, John and his son, Mark.

== Works ==
During his academic career Risjord had written over 26 books, numerous essays in historical journals, along with many reviews of books by notable historians in American history. (Listed below)

=== Historical focus and views ===
In Risjord's 1812: Conservatives, War Hawks, and the Nation's Honor, he maintains that the issues leading up to the declaration of war in 1812 were "primarily concerned with the honor and integrity of the nation", than with issues concerning economics or the Canadian border.

Several works are devoted to Virginia's role during the years leading up to the ratification of the Constitution in 1789, including, "Virginians and the Constitution: A Multivariant Analysis", and, "Chesapeake Politics", and, "The Evolution of Political Parties in Virginia". Risjord asserts the general theme that differences between Federalists and Republicans were not over matters of class and wealth, that sectionalism and partisanship played a major role. He also places emphasis on the influence of the enormous post war debts, foreign and domestic, owed by the United States. Risjord maintains that this was a national issue that weighed on both parties equally, and was the subject of three Congressional role calls in 1783–1784.

List of works (Monographs)

COLONIAL AND EARLY AMERICAN HISTORY

- 1812: Conservatives, War Hawks, and the Nation's Honor by Norman K. Risjord, Bobbs-Merrill Publishers 1961 (reprint series) (Note: Journal article of the same title in the William and Mary Quarterly, April 1961 Vol 12, No 1. By Norman K. Risjord, p. 176. (Note: Reviewed in the William and Mary Quarterly, Jan 1961 Vol 18, No 2. By W.C. Eccles, p. 95.; Cited, Indiana Magazine of History, vol. 75, No.March 1, 1979, p.70 by Donald R. Hickey; referenced in Journal of the Early Republic, Vol 5, No. 4 Winter 1985, p. 441 by Steven Edwin Siry.))
- Builders of Annapolis: Enterprise and Politics in a Colonial Capital (1969, 1997) Maryland Historical Society (Note: reviewed in the Virginia Magazine of History and Biography, Winter 1999 Vol 107, No 1. By James D. Kornwolf, p. 99; in the William and Mary Quarterly, Oct 1998 Vol 55, No 4. By David J. Jordan, p. 627; in The Journal of Southern History, May 1999 Vol 65, No 2. By Elaine G. Breslaw, p. 382.)
- The Old Republicans: Southern conservatism in the age of Jefferson (1965) Columbia University Press (Note: Reviewed in: • William and Mary Quarterly, Jul 1966 Vol 23, No 3. by Marvin Meyers, p. 487; • Annals of the American Academy of Political and Social Science, May 1966 Vol 365, No 4. by J. Leonard Bates, p. 208; • Virginia Magazine of History and Biography, Apr 1966 Vol 74, No 2. by Harry Ammon, p. 222; • Journal of Southern History, Feb 1966 Vol 32, No 1. by Paul Goodman, p. 99; • Indiana Magazine of History, Sep 1966 Vol 62, No 3. by Norman S. Cohen, p. 265; American Historical Review, Apr 1966 Vol 71, No 3. by Noble E. Cunningham, Jr., p. 1062; • North Carolina Historical Review, Apr 1966 Vol 43, No 2. by Daniel M. McFarland, p. 1062; • Catholic Historical Review, Oct 1968 Vol 54, No 3. By Sister Laurita Gibson, p. 533; • Southwest Social Science Quarterly, Sep 1966 Vol 47, No 2. by Don Higginbotham, p. 207; • Southwest Social Science Quarterly, Sep 1966 Vol 47, No 2. by Bertil L. Hanson, p. 210; • History, 1967 Vol 52, No 175. by Geoffrey Seed, p. 247; • English Historical Review, Jan 1968 Vol 83, No 326. by J.R. Pole, p. 201; • The Historian, Aug 1966 Vol 28, No 4. by J.R. Pole, p. 677.)
- The Virginia Federalists (1967)
- The Early American Party System (1969, 1970) Harper & Row
- Crisis: Courts and Politics in the Young Republic (1971)
- Forging The American Republic, 1760-1815 – January 1, 1973 Addison Books (Note: reviewed in: • Journal of American History, Dec 1974 Vol 61, No 3. by Robert McColley, p. 772; • The History Teacher, Nov 1973 Vol 7, No 1. by Jacob L. Susskind, p. 122.)
- A history of the United States to 1877, Risjord, Haywoode, Holt, 1983
- Chesapeake Politics 1781–1800 (1978) Columbia University Press (Note: Reviewed in: • Reviews in American History, Dec 1979 Vol 7, No 4. By Lance Banning, p. 499; • American Historical Review, Oct 1979 Vol 84, No 4. By Richard Buel, Jr., p. 1147; • Pennsylvania Magazine of History and Biography, Jul 1979 Vol 103, No 3. By Richard J. Cox, p. 499; • North Carolina Historical Review, Apr 1980 Vol 57, No 2. By John A. Munroe, p. 231; • Journal of Southern History, Aug 1979 Vol 45, No 3. By Frank A. Cassell, p. 431; • Annals of the American Academy of Political and Social Science, May 1979 Vol 443, by W.T. Generous, Jr, p. 175; • William and Mary Quarterly, Apr 1980 Vol 37, No 2. By David A. Bohmer, p. 328; • Virginia Magazine of History and Biography, Oct 1979 Vol 87, No 4. by George Green Shackelford, p. 231; • Journal of Economic History, Mar 1980 Vol 40, No 1, The Tasks of Economic History., by Allan Kulikoff, p. 207; • Journal of American History, Mar 1980 Vol 66, No 4, by James H. Broussard, p. 915.)
- Thomas Jefferson (American Profiles Series) (1994) Rowman & Littlefield (Note: Reviewed in: • Journal of Southern History, Nov 1995 Vol 61, No 4. by Norman G. Ralford, p. 791; • Pennsylvania Magazine of History and Biography, Jul 1995 Vol 119, No 3. by Eugene R. Sheridan, Willard Sterne Randall, p. 266; • Virginia Magazine of History and Biography, Jul 1995 Vol 103, No 3. by Constance B. Schulz, p. 379; • American Historical Review, Oct 1995 Vol 103, No 4. by Lance Banning, p. 1293; • North Carolina Historical Review, Jan 1995 Vol 72, No 1. by Ronald Schultz, p. 107; • Journal of the Early Republic, Winter 1994 Vol 72, No 1. by Mary Young, p. 567; • Journal of American History, Winter 1994 Vol 72, No 1. by Willard Sterne Randall, p. 215.)
- Jefferson's America, 1760–1815 Third Edition 2009. Madison House Publishers (Note: Reviewed in the Journal of the Early Republic, Spring 1992 Vol 18, No 2. By Steven Watts, p. 95; and The Journal of Southern History, Nov 1993 Vol 59, No 4. By Joseph J. Ellis, p. 743.)
- Election of 1812 (2019)

AMERICAN SOCIAL HISTORY

- Mary Boykin Chesnut: A Confederate Woman's Life (American Profiles Series) 1998 by Maryu A. DeCredico, Norman K. Risjord (Note: reviewed in the Georgia Historical Quarterly, Spring 1997 Vol 81, No 1. by Leslie J. Gordon, p. 194.)

Representative Americans Series (Rowman & Littlefield Publishers):

- The Romantics (2001) (Note: reviewed in the History magazine, Oct 2003 Vol 88, No 4. by Ben Marsh, p. 639)
- The Colonists (2001, 2002) (Note: reviewed in the History magazine, Oct 2002 Vol 87, No 288. by Keith Mason, p. 562; in The History Teacher, Nov 1981 Vol 15, No 1. by Raymond C. Bailey, p. 151; in the Georgia Historical Quarterly, Spring 1982 Vol 66, No 1. by Milton L. Ready, p. 73.)
- The Revolutionary Generation (2001)
- The Civil War Generation (2002)
- Populists and Progressives (2004)
- Giants in their Time: Representative Americans from the Jazz Age to the Cold War (2005)

GENERAL AMERICAN HISTORY WORKS

- People and Our Country by Norman K. Risjord and Terry L. Haywoode, January 1, 1978. Holt, Rinehart and Winston
- America: A History of the United States (1979, 1988) vol. 1 & 2. Pearson Press, College Division (Note: reviewed in The History Teacher, Feb 1987 Vol 20, No 2. by Fred M. Dahm, p. 303.)
- America: The Glorious Republic (1987)
- Insights on American History vol. 1 & 2 (1988) Harcourt College Publications

LOCAL HISTORY

- Wisconsin: The Story of the Badger State (1995) Trails Media Group
- A Popular History of Minnesota (2005, 2009) Minnesota Historical Society Press
- Shining Big Sea Water: The Story of Lake Superior (2008)
- Dakota: The Story of the Northern Plains (2013) University of North Dakota Press (Note: Reviewed in the Great Plains Quarterly, Summer 2014 Vol 34, No 3. by Kimberly K. Porter, p. 283.)

=== List of journal articles (partial) ===
- * Risjord, Norman K. (April 1961). "1812: Conservatives, War Hawks and the Nation's Honor". The William and Mary Quarterly. 18 (2). Omohundro Institute of Early American History and Culture: 196–210. doi:10.2307/1918543. JSTOR 1918543.
- "The Virginia Federalists" (1967) Southern Historical Association
- "The Evolution of Political Parties in Virginia, 1782-1800" with Gordon Denboer (1974) Journal of American History
- The Evolution of Political Parties in Virginia, 1782–1800, Norman K. Risjord, Gordon DenBoer, The Journal of American History, Vol. 60, No. 4 (Mar. 1974), pp. 961–984
- Risjord, Norman K. (October 1974). "Virginians and the Constitution: A Multivariant Analysis". The William and Mary Quarterly. 34 (4). Omohundro Institute of Early American History and Culture: 613–632. doi:10.2307/1921606. JSTOR 1921606.
- The Compromise of 1790: New Evidence on the Dinner Table Bargain, Norman K. Risjord, The William and Mary Quarterly, Vol. 33, No. 2 (Apr. 1976), pp. 309–314
- Risjord, Norman K. (October 1992). "Partisanship and Power: House Committees and the Powers of the Speaker, 1789-1801". The William and Mary Quarterly. 49 (4). Omohundro Institute of Early American History and Culture: 628–651. doi:10.2307/2947175. JSTOR 2947175.
- Jean Nicolet's Search for the South Sea, Norman K. Risjord, The Wisconsin Magazine of History, Vol. 84, No. 3 (Spring, 2001), pp. 34–43
- James Anderson: Infantryman in Blue, Norman K. Risjord, The Wisconsin Magazine of History, Vol. 87, No. 4 (Summer, 2004), pp. 36–49
- Big Game on the South Side: A Milwaukee Baseball Mystery Decoded, Norman K. Risjord, The Wisconsin Magazine of History, Vol. 88, No. 3 (Spring, 2005), pp. 28–39
- Risjord, Norman K. (Spring 2005). "From the Plow to the Cow: William D. Hoard and America's Dairyland". The Wisconsin Magazine of History. 88 (3). Wisconsin Historical Society: 40–49. JSTOR 4637137.

=== Reviews in scholarly journals ===
Norman K. Risjord published reviews in scholarly journals, and these attest to his scholarly standing in his field for over forty years of active academic life:

Reviews of at least 46 published monographs in 12 scholarly journals cited in @ JSTOR search on au:("Norman Risjord"): William and Mary Quarterly (4), The New England Quarterly (2), The Mississippi Valley Historical Review (2), Journal of Southern History (13), Journal of American History (11), Wisconsin Magazine of History (5), Virginia Magazine of History and Biography (2), Political Science Quarterly, Arkansas Historical Quarterly, American Historical Review (4), Reviews in American History, and Register of the Kentucky Historical Society.

1960s

- The Coming of War: An Account of the Remarkable Events Leading to the War of 1812 by Albert Z. Carr, Review by: Norman K. Risjord, The William and Mary Quarterly, Vol. 18, No. 3 (Jul. 1961), pp. 451–452
- Prologue to War: England and the United States, 1805–1812 by Bradford Perkins, Review by: Norman K. Risjord, The New England Quarterly, Vol. 35, No. 3 (Sep. 1962), pp. 420–422
- The Causes of the War of 1812 by Reginald Horsman, Review by: Norman K. Risjord, The William and Mary Quarterly, Vol. 20, No. 2 (Apr. 1963), pp. 314–316
- Evolution of a Federalist: William Loughton Smith of Charleston (1758–1812) by George C. Rogers, Jr., Review by: Norman K. Risjord, The Mississippi Valley Historical Review, Vol. 50, No. 1 (Jun. 1963), pp. 121–122
- The Republic in Peril: 1812 by Roger H. Brown, Review by: Norman K. Risjord, The New England Quarterly, Vol. 37, No. 3 (Sep. 1964), pp. 400–402
- The Awakening of American Nationalism, 1815–1828 by George Dangerfield, Review by: Norman K. Risjord, The Journal of Southern History, Vol. 31, No. 3 (Aug. 1965), pp. 331–332
- Matthew Elliott, British Indian Agent by Reginald Horsman, Review by: Norman K. Risjord The Journal of American History, Vol. 52, No. 2 (Sep. 1965), pp. 356–357
- Slavery and Jeffersonian Virginia by Robert McColley, Review by: Norman K. Risjord, The Wisconsin Magazine of History, Vol. 49, No. 3 (Spring, 1966), pp. 253–254
- The Second American Party System: Party Formation in the Jacksonian Era by Richard P. McCormick, Review by: Norman K. Risjord, The Virginia Magazine of History and Biography, Vol. 74, No. 3 (Jul. 1966), pp. 361–363
- The Northern Colonial Frontier, 1607–1763 by Douglas Edward Leach, Review by: Norman K. Risjord, The Wisconsin Magazine of History, Vol. 50, No. 3 (Spring, 1967), pp. 269–270
- Thomas Mann Randolph: Jefferson's Son-in-Law by William H. Gaines, Jr., Review by: Norman K. Risjord, The Journal of American History, Vol. 53, No. 4 (Mar. 1967), pp. 810–811
- Colonial South Carolina: A Political History, 1663–1763 by M. Eugene Sirmans, Review by: Norman K. Risjord, The Wisconsin Magazine of History, Vol. 50, No. 2 (Winter, 1967), p. 177
- Aaron Burr: Portrait of an Ambitious Man by Herbert S. Parmet, Marie B. Hecht, Review by: Norman K. Risjord, The Journal of Southern History, Vol. 34, No. 4 (Nov. 1968), pp. 607–608
- Prologue to Democracy: The Federalists in the South, 1789–1800 by Lisle A. Rose, Review by: Norman K. Risjord, The William and Mary Quarterly, Vol. 26, No. 1 (Jan. 1969), pp. 129–132

1970s

- The Allegheny Frontier: West Virginia Beginnings, 1730–1830 by Otis K. Rice, Review by: Norman K. Risjord, The Journal of Southern History, Vol. 36, No. 4 (Nov. 1970), pp. 586–588
- Federalist in Dissent: Imagery and Ideology in Jeffersonian America by Linda K. Kerber, Review by: Norman K. Risjord The Journal of American History, Vol. 57, No. 4 (Mar. 1971), pp. 910–911
- To the Hartford Convention: The Federalists and the Origins of Party Politics in Massachusetts, 1789–1815. by James M. Banner, Review by: Norman K. Risjord, Political Science Quarterly, Vol. 86, No. 3 (Sep. 1971), pp. 484–485
- The Papers of George Mason: 1725-1792 by Robert A. Rutland, Review by: Norman K. Risjord, The Journal of American History, Vol. 58, No. 4 (Mar. 1972), pp. 982–987
- A New Meaning for Jefferson's Democracy, The Jeffersonian Crisis: Courts and Politics in the Young Republic. by Richard E. Ellis, Review by: Norman K. Risjord, Reviews in American History, Vol. 1, No. 1 (Mar. 1973), pp. 88–95
- The Old Dominion and the New Nation, 1788–1801 by Richard R. Beeman, Review by: Norman K. Risjord, The Journal of Southern History, Vol. 39, No. 2 (May 1973), pp. 282–284
- The Emergence of the Presidential Nominating Convention, 1789–1832 by James S. Chase, Review by: Norman K. Risjord, The Arkansas Historical Quarterly, Vol. 33, No. 3 (Autumn, 1974), pp. 262–263
- From Colony to Country: The Revolution in American Thought, 1750–1820 by Ralph Ketcham, Review by: Norman K. Risjord, The Journal of American History, Vol. 62, No. 2 (Sep. 1975), p. 378
- Political Parties in American History. Volume I: 1789-1828 by Morton Borden, Winfred E. A. Bernhard Political Parties in American History. Volume II: 1828-1890 by Morton Borden, Felice A. Bonadio Political Parties in American History. Volume III: 1890: Present by Morton Borden, Paul L. Murphy, Review by: Norman K. Risjord, The Wisconsin Magazine of History, Vol. 59, No. 4 (Summer, 1976), pp. 332–333
- Revolution's Godchild: The Birth, Death, and Regeneration of the Society of the Cincinnati in North Carolina by Curtis Carroll Davis, Review by: Norman K. Risjord, The Journal of Southern History, Vol. 43, No. 4 (Nov. 1977), pp. 641–642 by N
- The Jeffersonian Persuasion: Evolution of a Party Ideology by Lance Banning, Review by: Norman K. Risjord, The William and Mary Quarterly, Vol. 35, No. 4 (Oct. 1978), pp. 744–746
- Andrew Jackson and the Course of American Empire, 1767–1821 by Robert V. Remini, Review by: Norman Risjord, The Wisconsin Magazine of History, Vol. 62, No. 2 (Winter, 1978–1979), pp. 159–160
- Fairfax County, Virginia: A History by Nan Netherton, Donald Sweig, Janice Artemel, Patricia Hickin, Patrick Read, Review by: Norman K. Risjord, The Virginia Magazine of History and Biography, Vol. 87, No. 2 (Apr. 1979), pp. 213–214
- Jefferson and the presidency: Leadership in the Young Republic by Robert M. Johnstone, Jr., Review by: Norman K. Risjord, The Journal of American History, Vol. 66, No. 2 (Sep. 1979), pp. 388–389
- The Southern Federalists, 1800–1816 by James H. Broussard, Review by: Norman K. Risjord, The American Historical Review, Vol. 84, No. 4 (Oct. 1979), p. 1147

1980s

1980s-1990s, and 2001 reviews total of 16 published in 5 scholarly journals cited in @ JSTOR search on au:("Norman Risjord").

- Community Leadership in Maryland, 1790-1840: A Comparative Analysis of Power in Society by Whitman H. Ridgway, Review by: Norman K. Risjord, The Journal of Southern History, Vol. 46, No. 4 (Nov. 1980), pp. 600–601
- James Barbour, a Jeffersonian Republican by Charles D. Lowery, Review by: Norman K. Risjord, The American Historical Review, Vol. 90, No. 4 (Oct. 1985), pp. 1009–1010
- In Pursuit of Reason: The Life of Thomas Jefferson by Noble E. Cunningham Jr., Review by: Norman K. Risjord, The Register of the Kentucky Historical Society, Vol. 85, No. 4 (Autumn 1987), pp. 367–368
- Origins of American Political Parties, 1789–1803. by John F. Hoadley, Review by: Norman K. Risjord, The Journal of Southern History, Vol. 53, No. 2 (May 1987), pp. 317–318

1990s & 2001

- Liberty in America, 1600 to the Present. Volume Two: Liberty in Expansion, 1760–1850. by Oscar Handlin, Lilian Handlin, Review by: Norman K. Risjord, The Journal of Southern History, Vol. 57, No. 2 (May 1991), pp. 308–309
- Benjamin Franklin Bache and the Philadelphia Aurora. by James Tagg, Review by: Norman K. Risjord, The Journal of American History, Vol. 79, No. 1 (Jun. 1992), p. 252
- The Creation of Washington, D. C.: The Idea and Location of the American Capital. by Kenneth R. Bowling, Review by: Norman K. Risjord, The Journal of Southern History, Vol. 59, No. 4 (Nov. 1993), pp. 748–749
- American Politics in the Early Republic: The New Nation in Crisis by James Roger Sharp, Review by: Norman K. Risjord, The Virginia Magazine of History and Biography, Vol. 103, No. 1, "They Were Men of Our Shape": Image and Ego in Civil War Biography (Jan. 1995), pp. 128–129
- The Age of Federalism by Stanley Elkins, Eric McKitrick, Review by: Norman K. Risjord, The Journal of Southern History, Vol. 61, No. 2 (May 1995), pp. 369–370
- Sworn on the Altar of God: A Religious Biography of Thomas Jefferson. by Edwin S. Gausta The Inner Jefferson: Portrait of a Grieving Optimist. by Andrew Burstein Principle and Interest: Thomas Jefferson and the Problem of Debt. by Herbert E. Sloan Review by: Norman K. Risjord The Journal of American History, Vol. 83, No. 3 (Dec. 1996), pp. 980–981
- The Long Affair: Thomas Jefferson and the French Revolution, 1785–1800. by Conor Cruise O'Brien Thomas Jefferson and the Changing West: From Conquest to Conservation. by James P. Ronda, Review by: Norman K. Risjord, The Journal of American History, Vol. 85, No. 2 (Sep. 1998), pp. 659–661
- The Paris Years of Thomas Jefferson by William Howard Adams, Review by: Norman K. Risjord, The American Historical Review, Vol. 103, No. 4 (Oct. 1998), p. 1317
- Jefferson's Declaration of Independence: Origins, Philosophy, and Theology by Allen Jayne, Review by: Norman K. Risjord, The Journal of Southern History, Vol. 65, No. 2 (May 1999), pp. 388–389
- Setting the World Ablaze: Washington, Adams, Jefferson, and the American Revolution by John Ferling, Review by: Norman K. Risjord, The Journal of American History, Vol. 88, No. 2 (Sep. 2001), pp. 628–629
- The Other Founders: Anti-Federalism and the Dissenting Tradition in America, 1788–1828 by Saul Cornell, Review by: Norman K. Risjord, The American Historical Review, Vol. 106, No. 1 (Feb. 2001), pp. 166–167

== See also ==
- First Party System
- James Fulton Zimmerman, contemporary Early American historian
- History of the United States (1789–1849)

== Bibliography ==
- "Norman Risjord". Fulbright U.S. Scholar Directory. 1967–1968.
- "Norman Risjord". Fulbright U.S. Scholar Directory. 1983–1984.
- Hickey, Donald R. (1989). The War of 1812: A Forgotten Conflict. Urbana; Chicago: University of Illinois Press. ISBN 0-252-01613-0.
- —— (April 1978). "Federalist Party Unity and the War of 1812". Journal of American Studies. 12 (1). Cambridge University Press: 23–39. doi:10.1017/S0021875800006162. JSTOR 27553362. S2CID 144907975.
- Hickey, Donald R. (March 1979). "The Federalists and the Coming of the War, 1811-1812". Indiana Magazine of History. 75 (1). Indiana University Press: 70–88. JSTOR 27790356.
- Risjord, Norman (1965). The Old Republicans: Southern Conservatism in the Age of Jefferson.
- —— (November 1967). "The Virginia Federalists". The Journal of Southern History. 33 (4). Southern Historical Association: 486–517. doi:10.2307/2204473. JSTOR 2204473.
- —— (1969). The Early American Party System.
- ——; Denboer, Gordon (March 1974). "The Evolution of Political Parties in Virginia, 1782-1800". The Journal of American History. 60 (4). Oxford University Press: 961–984. doi:10.2307/1901009. JSTOR 1901009.
- —— (1991). Jefferson's America, 1760-1815. Madison : Madison House. ISBN 978-1-4422-0052-4.
- —— (April 1961). "1812: Conservatives, War Hawks and the Nation's Honor". The William and Mary Quarterly. 18 (2). Omohundro Institute of Early American History and Culture: 196–210. doi:10.2307/1918543. JSTOR 1918543.
- "A Leisurely Walk through PLATO's HistoryRemembering Norman Risjord" (PDF). PLATO Weekly. 2019.
- "Normand K. Risjord". Gunderson Funeral Home.
- "Norman K. Risjord". University of Wisconsin. 2019.
- Risjord, Norman K. (1978). Chesapeake Politics. Columbia University Press. ISBN 978-0-2310-4328-1.
- "Memorials: Norman Risjord". Wisconsin State Journal; Omohundro Institute.
- "GoodReads": Books by Norman K. Risjord
- Stevens, Michael (February 5, 2019). "A Leisurely Walk through PLATO's History: Remembering Norman Risjord" (PDF). PLATO Weekly Update.
- "PLATO: Participatory Learning and Teaching Organization". University of Wisconsin, via The Wisconsin Idea.
- "Univ. Wisconsin Data Base; Participatory Learning and Teaching Organization".
- "The Wisconsin Idea". University of Wisconsin-Madison. 2020.
- "Depauw University, A Pictorial History". Depauw University Press.
- Risjord, Norman K. (October 1992). "Partisanship and Power: House Committees and the Powers of the Speaker, 1789-1801". The William and Mary Quarterly. 49 (4). Omohundro Institute of Early American History and Culture: 628–651. doi:10.2307/2947175. JSTOR 2947175.
- "Norman K. Risjord (1931-2019)" (PDF). The Past in the Present, 2019 News for Alumni and Friends from the Department of History. University of Wisconsin: 1–33. 2019.
- "Norman K. Risjord (Grad '60)". University of Virginia Magazine. 1960.
- "The Fulbright Program". Bureau of Educational and Cultural Affairs; U.S. Department of State.
