= Mackenzie Fierceton =

American activist and graduate student

- Born: Mackenzie Terrell; August 9, 1997 (age 29); Danbury, Connecticut, U.S.
- Other name: Mackenzie Morrison
- Education: University of Pennsylvania (BA, MSW)
- Known for: Controversy over representation of childhood and abuse

Mackenzie Cahira Fierceton (born Mackenzie Terrell; August 9, 1997; later Mackenzie Morrison) is an American activist and graduate student. Raised in Chesterfield, Missouri, she attended Whitfield School in Creve Coeur, graduated from the University of Pennsylvania with a bachelor's in political science and master's in social work, and is a graduate student at the University of Oxford.

Fierceton came to international attention when she became embroiled in a scandal over how she characterized her background in her university and Rhodes Scholarship applications. Coverage of the case provoked debate around the different definitions of first-generation used in higher education and whether Fierceton as a foster care leaver estranged from her parents qualified or not, and whether universities exploited the narratives of first-generation students.

== Early life ==
Fierceton was born August 9, 1997, by the name Mackenzie Terrell, in Danbury, Connecticut, to Carrie Morrison, a physician who would later head the breast imaging department at St. Luke's Hospital in Chesterfield, where the couple lived. Her father, Billy Terrell, had been an actor in soap operas. Fierceton ceased to have a relationship with her biological father after her parents divorced in the early 2000s and Morrison was granted custody. Afterwards, Morrison changed her daughter's last name to her own.

Fierceton attended Whitfield, an exclusive private school in Creve Coeur, where annual tuition was almost $30,000. She achieved high grades and was active in student government, volunteering, and varsity sports. After she entered foster care, she received a scholarship to complete her studies at Whitfield.

=== Abuse allegations ===
On several occasions Fierceton attended school with injuries. Coming to the school with a black eye prompted a visit from the Missouri Department of Social Services (DSS), who accepted the story that Fierceton had tripped and fallen. On another occasion, she sustained a head injury and was hospitalised at St Luke's, where her mother worked. Morrison told the admitting physician she thought the injury had been caused by her daughter falling down the stairs.

During this time, Fierceton alleges that she was subjected to emotional and physical abuse from her mother, and was sexually assaulted by her mother's partner, Henry Lovelace Jr. She began to keep a secret diary, where she wrote about her fear of coming forward in case she was not believed, saying of Morrison: "She lies better than I can tell the truth."

In September 2014 after disclosing Lovelace's abuse to her history teacher, who reported it to the state's child-abuse hotline, Fierceton sustained further injuries and was hospitalized. Fierceton alleged that Morrison, who had apparently learned of the report, confronted her daughter about it, pushed her down the stairs, and beat her. This led to Morrison and Lovelace's arrests.

The St. Louis County district attorney's office dropped all the charges against Morrison and Lovelace before the case could go before a grand jury. Morrison's name was ordered removed from the DSS's child-abuser registry after Morrison brought a suit in circuit court. Judge Kristine Allen Kerr ultimately held for Morrison, stating that a preponderance of the evidence could not support the conclusion that Morrison was a child abuser. After the trial, Mackenzie changed her surname to Fierceton.

=== Foster care ===
After her hospitalisation, Fierceton did not see her mother in private again and was placed into foster care, moving between three foster homes before formally leaving the system when she turned 18. Though she left voluntarily and was entitled to remain until she was 21, Fierceton later recalled that she felt pressured to leave by the DSS.

Fierceton was accepted at the University of Pennsylvania on a full scholarship, arranged through QuestBridge.

== University of Pennsylvania ==
At the University of Pennsylvania (Penn), Fierceton majored in political science and, concurrent with her undergraduate studies, joined a master's degree program in social work at Penn's School of Social Policy and Practice, which would lead to a master's degree a year after completing her undergraduate degree.

While at Penn, Fierceton was one of 15 freshmen made Civic Scholars, a program focused on social justice and community service, with an emphasis on confronting the intersections of identity and privilege. Professor Walter Licht, a Penn historian who runs the program, recalled her as the sort of student who would "[ask] a question that makes everyone stop and brings the conversation to a different pitch." She also worked as a policy fellow for a Philadelphia City Council member, and interned in social work at Children's Hospital of Philadelphia.

Fierceton received her undergraduate degree from the University of Pennsylvania in 2020.

=== Wrongful death lawsuit ===
In 2020 after suffering an epileptic seizure in a basement of Penn's Caster Building, Fierceton campaigned to improve accessibility in the building. It reportedly took medical personnel approximately an hour to extract her from the building due to difficulties in fitting a stretcher in the elevator or stairway. In March 2021, her experience led to her deposition in a lawsuit against the university over the wrongful death of Cameron Driver, who had died following a medical emergency in the basement in 2018.

== Scholarship controversy ==
In November 2020, Fierceton won a Rhodes Scholarship to study for a Doctor of Philosophy on the child welfare and juvenile justice systems. However, controversy soon emerged over how Fierceton's application characterised her childhood, after press coverage that referred to Fierceton's upbringing as "poor" was disputed by the father of one of her Whitfield contemporaries. This initiated a chain of events that led to a re-examination of Fierceton's scholarship applications, and opened the question of if she had misled Penn and the Rhodes Trust in identifying as a "first-generation low income" student.

=== Rhodes Trust investigation ===
At Penn, Mackenzie was interviewed by interim provost Beth Winkelstein about her abuse and hospitalization. The nature and conduct of this interview was criticised by Fierceton's professors at the time, and later in depositions during Fierceton's lawsuit. Professor Rogers Smith said he believed the university had already decided that Fierceton's abuse allegations were fabricated with the goal of finding an easier way into Penn before beginning their investigation.

During this time, Penn's general counsel Wendy White began corresponding with Fierceton's estranged biological mother Morrison, who claimed that Fierceton had constructed the abuse narrative because she felt pressure after failing an AP Chemistry test, although this version of events is not consistent with her Whitfield transcript, and Morrison's sister, who claimed that Fierceton had planted her blood in the house to frame her mother. In a later court deposition, White said she had destroyed her notes from these calls.

Penn proposed to revoke Fierceton's bachelor's on the grounds of her misrepresentation, unless she agreed to withdraw from the Rhodes Scholarship, surrender her Latin honors, and take a mandatory leave for "counseling and support." After Fierceton complained to professors that she felt Penn was pressuring her, White wrote to her adding the requirement that Fierceton say she was agreeing to withdraw from the scholarship "voluntarily and without pressure." Fierceton rejected the offer.

During its investigation, the Rhodes Trust received an anonymous 22-page letter alleging that Fierceton was misrepresenting herself as having been poor and grown up entirely in foster care, accompanied with childhood photos. Fierceton believes it was likely sent by Morrison or one of her close relatives, because of the inclusion of childhood photos.

In April 2021, the Trust's investigative committee produced a 15-page report praising Fierceton as "gifted, driven, and charismatic" but concluding ultimately that she "created and repeatedly shared false narratives about herself", referring to the photographs and noting inconsistencies between how Fierceton's injuries were described in her college application essay and her medical records. It recommended the scholarship be rescinded, and Fierceton voluntarily withdrew.

=== Penn Office of Student Conduct investigation ===
At Penn in April 2021, the matter was referred to Penn's Office of Student Conduct, which suspended the awarding of Fierceton's master's degree. Their investigation concluded that "Mackenzie may have centered certain aspects of her background to the exclusion of others—for reasons we are certain she feels are valid—in a way that creates a misimpression." The Office of Student Conduct issued a $4,000 fine and ordered a notation on Fierceton's transcript that she had been sanctioned, and the appeals panel refused to release Fierceton's degree until she had made a formal letter of apology.

The fine was later quashed as not in accordance with the university's charter and, following press coverage, an open letter from students and alumni, and a walkout by students, Penn released her master's degree in April 2022.

In December 2021, Fierceton began legal action against Penn, accusing the university of retaliating against her for her involvement in the wrongful death lawsuit. In February 2024, she reached a settlement with the university for an undisclosed sum, without having to sign a nondisclosure agreement, according to Norton. Smith believes that in the wake of former president Liz Magill's poorly received testimony at a congressional hearing on antisemitism on college campuses in the wake of protests over the Gaza war, the university was eager to avoid further bad publicity. He also believes it had concluded it could not defend some of its actions in Fierceton's case in open court. Fierceton said she was strongly considering attending law school as a result of the experience.

== Further studies ==
In April 2022, Fierceton was a DPhil student at the University of Oxford.

== Critical commentary on investigations ==
=== Nature of "first-generation low-income" students ===
The exact definition of "first generation" and "FGLI" and whether Fierceton was correct to identify as such has been a key consideration in the Rhodes Trust and Penn investigations, as well as media coverage. In The New Yorker's piece on the controversy, journalist Rachel Aviv suggested the root cause of the controversy was the ambiguity of the term "first generation low income", meaning either first generation or low income, not necessarily both, and noted that multiple definitions of "first generation" are in use by different institutions, and even within Penn.

Fierceton did not identify her estranged biological parents on her college application, following the advice of her college counselor. She was therefore automatically coded by Penn's admissions department as a first-generation student, even though her biological mother had an advanced degree.

While at Penn, Fierceton attended meetings of Penn First, a student support group for FGLI students, which she called, "one of the first spaces on campus where I felt, These are my people ... I had never heard of FGLI, but these labels resonated with a story I was still trying to process."

In her Master's application to Penn's School of Social Policy and Practice, she answered positively the question "Are you the first generation in your family to attend college?" During the Penn investigation, Fierceton referred to Penn First's definition, which includes the language about the student having a "strained or limited relationship" with the graduate parent. After the fact, Fierceton asked the school's associate director of admissions how a former foster youth should answer that question, and was told "the education level (and/or financial status) of the biological parents would be irrelevant." The university responded that the question was "composed of ordinary words with everyday meanings, and it makes no reference to any term or definition appearing in any other publication."

In her Intercept interview, Fierceton noted that the school had never shared what its definition of FGLI was and discussed what she took it to mean:

... I identify with the FGLI umbrella term and definitely being a low-income student, but I've never really called myself a standalone first-generation. But when you're filling out a box where it's "yes" or "no" and there's no more information or "kind of!" box, it's like you have to fit yourself in, saying: Are you the first in your family to attend? And you’re getting instruction from a university official that that's how you're supposed to fill it out, that's what the definition says online. And to me, I'm like I am a household of one, so I am the only person in my family.

=== "Poverty porn" ===
The New Yorker article criticized Penn for using FGLI stories, including Fierceton's and that of another FGLI Rhodes scholar, as poverty porn, suggesting the university had turned on her when it learned she had actually come from a privileged, affluent background and thus did not fit the narrative of having grown up in foster care recounted in its press release.

Others echoed the criticism. "Without her trauma, she didn’t matter", wrote a commentator in the Tulane Hullabaloo. "How much does one have to suffer to have value? ... Yes, it may be true that institutions like UPenn give students like Fierceton opportunities because of their story, but that does not mean her narrative is theirs for the taking. Nor is she obligated to meet their expectations of her."

Fierceton's professor, Anne Norton, told the New Yorker:

I cannot avoid the sense that Mackenzie is being faulted for not having suffered enough. She was a foster child, but not for long enough. She is poor, but she has not been poor for long enough. She was abused, but there is not enough blood. [By questioning so much of Fierceton's story, Penn made itself] complicit in a long campaign of continuing abuse."

Jay Caspian Kang sounded similar themes in two different New York Times newsletters discussing Fierceton's story, writing,

"Was the problem that a child who was placed into foster care and had no contact with her biological mother wasn't actually a first-generation college student? Or was the real issue that Fierceton did not really fit the profile of a suffering student who needed the benevolence of an Ivy League school?

== Personal life ==
Fierceton identifies as queer.

== See also ==
- DARVO, strategy of accused abusers of in turn accusing their victims
- Linda Tirado, activist whose viral narrative about living in poverty as a single mother was later questioned when her background in an affluent family was revealed.
