= John Carter Brown Library =

Research library at Brown University

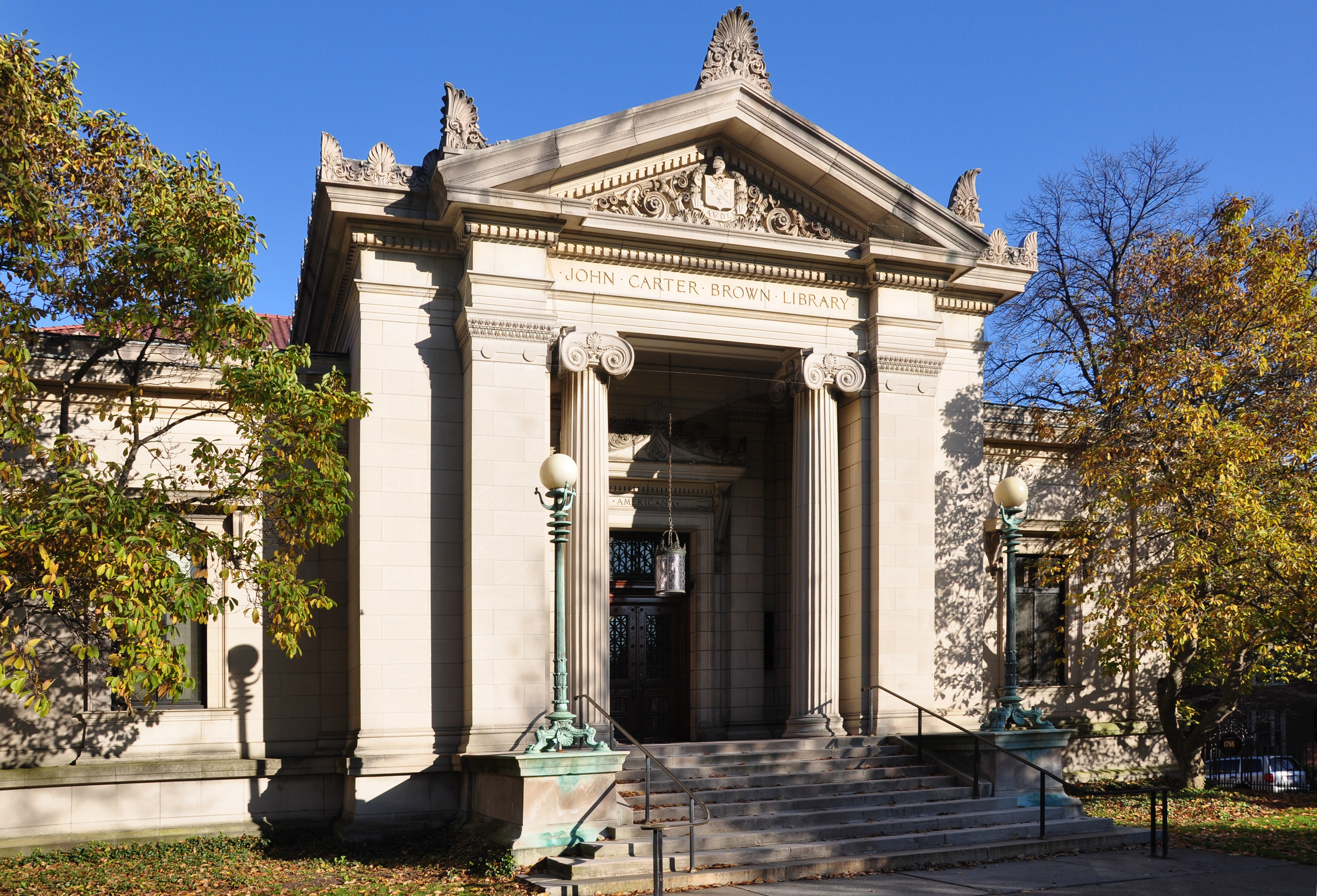
- John Carter Brown Library
- 41.8262°N 71.4032°W
- Location: Brown University, Providence, RI, United States
- Type: Research library
- Scope: History, Humanities
- Established: 1846; 180 years ago

Other information
- Website: www.jcblibrary.org

The John Carter Brown Library is an independently funded research library of history and the humanities on the campus of Brown University in Providence, Rhode Island. The library's rare book, manuscript, and map collections encompass a variety of topics related to the history of European exploration and colonization of the New World until circa 1825. The library was the first independent private library placed within the context of a university campus in the United States.

== History ==
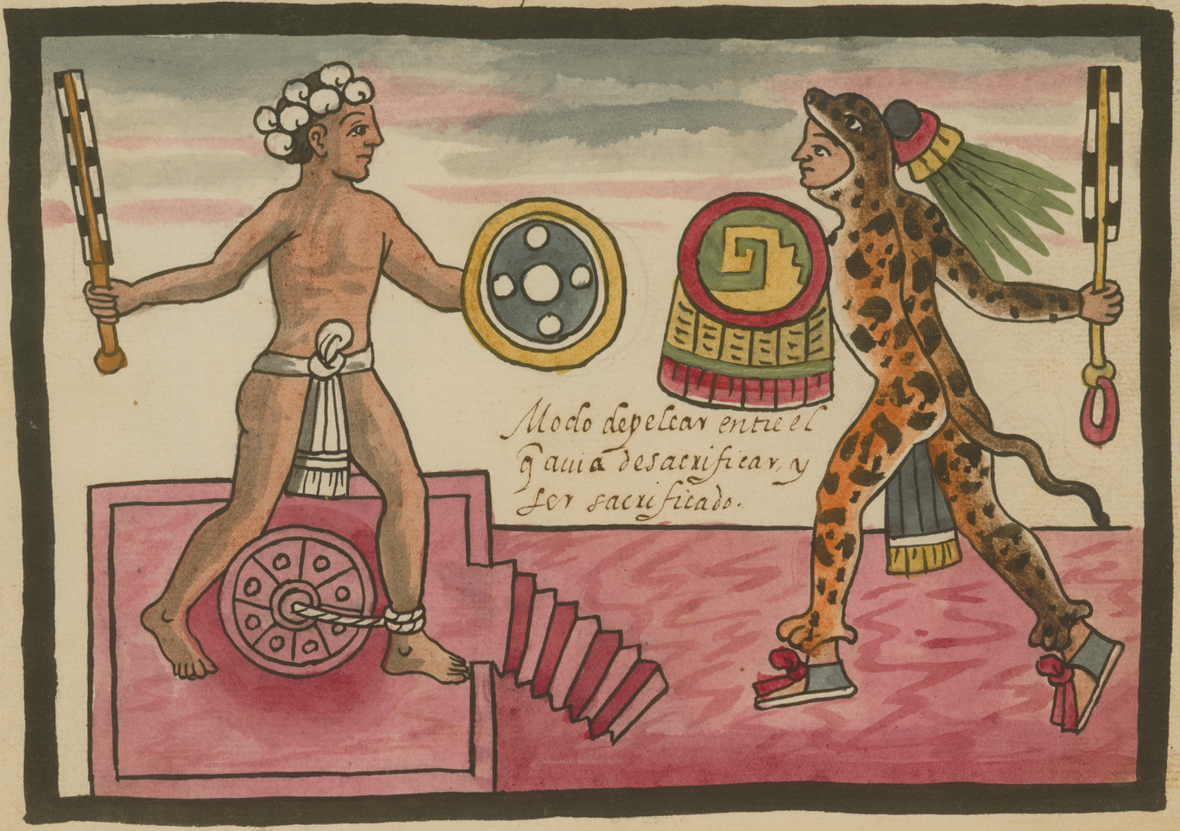
Illustration from the JCB's copy of the Tovar Codex, depicting a rite from the Aztec festival of Tlacaxipehualiztli

The John Carter Brown Library began as the private collection of John Carter Brown. Beginning in 1845, Brown began traveling throughout Europe in search of books and materials related European exploration and colonization of the New World. Brown acquired a number of rare books from prominent libraries, including those of Henri Ternaux-Compans and Maximilian I of Mexico.

After John Carter Brown's death, his wife Sophia Augusta Brown continued collecting with the advisement of John Russell Bartlett and Rush Hawkins. During his lifetime, John Nicholas Brown, son of John Nicholas, continued to expand the collection. Prior to his 1900 death, the collection was kept in a special fireproof library within the Brown family residence. In accordance with his will, the trustees of Brown's estate established the collection, together with a building to house it, at a permanent site on the campus of Brown University. Per an agreement reached between the executors and the university, the library is owned by the University Corporation but maintains "its own separate and special housing" and is "kept separate and distinct from any other Library."

=== The building ===
The Library is housed in a Beaux-Arts style building on Brown's main green, designed by the architects Shepley, Rutan, and Coolidge, and completed in 1904. The building was expanded in 1990, with funds provided by New Jersey financier and philanthropist Finn M. W. Caspersen. The four-story annex, designed by the Washington, D.C., architects Hartman-Cox, was named the "Caspersen Building" in honor of Caspersen's parents.

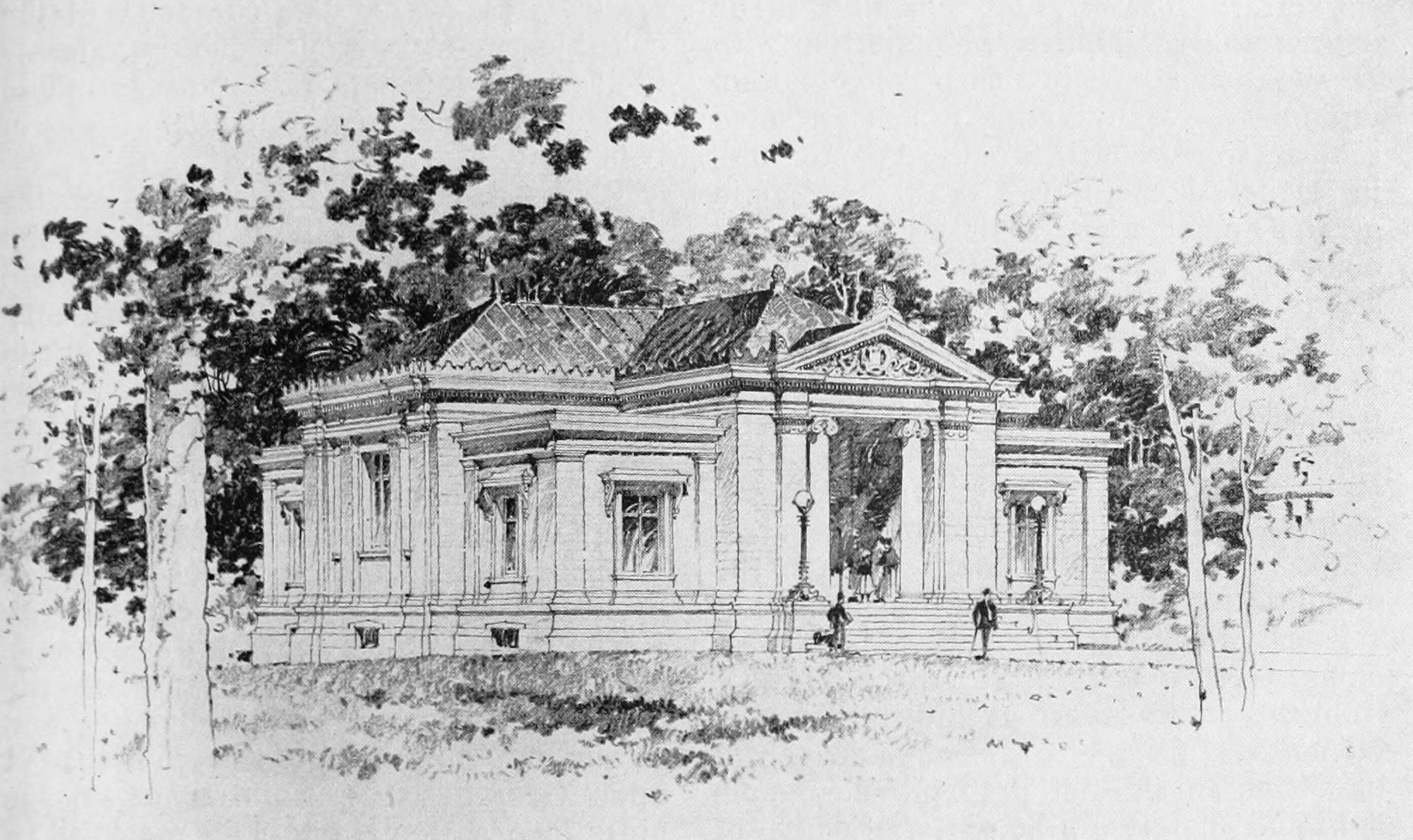
An illustration of the building published in 1902

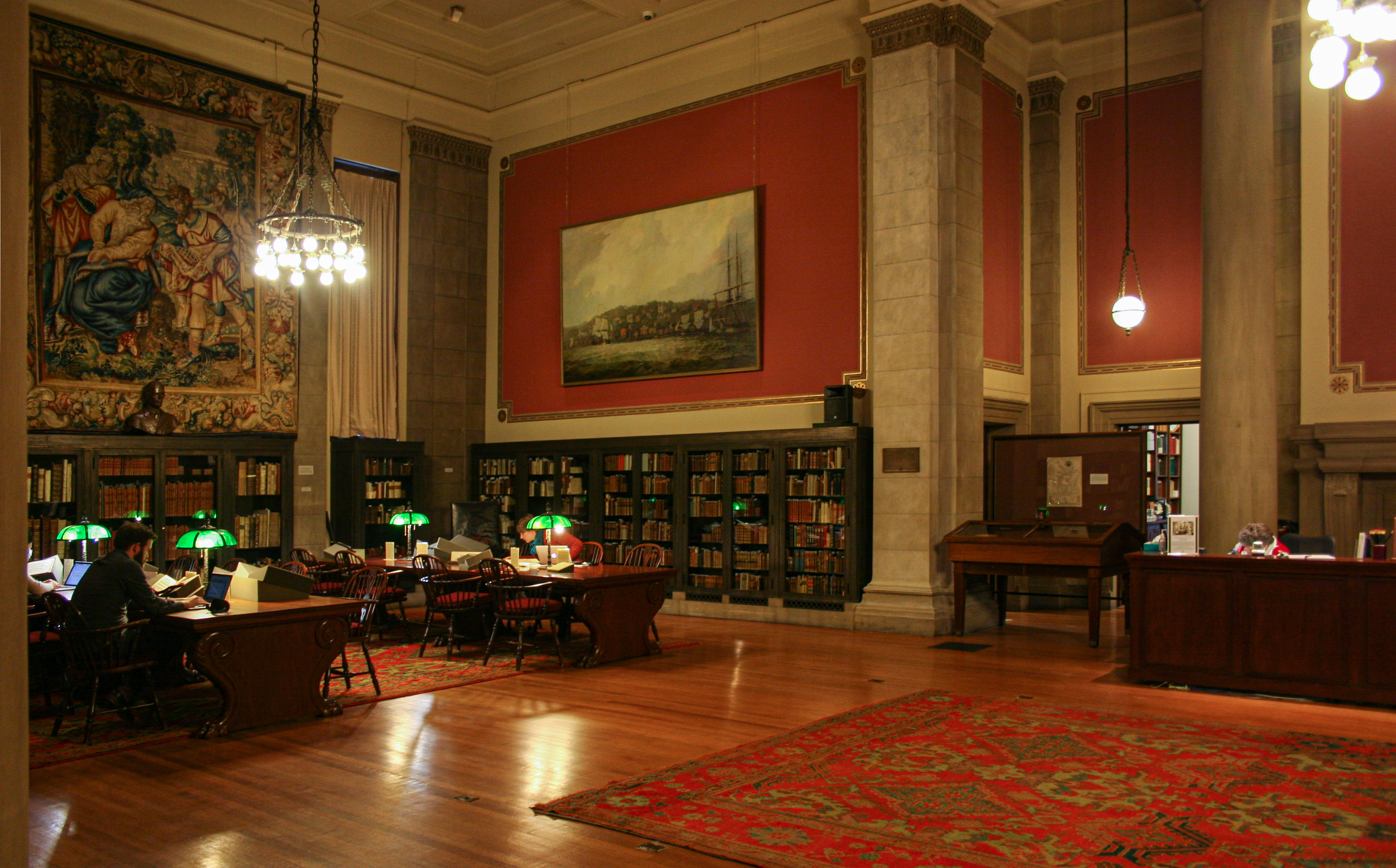
Interior of the MacMillan Reading Room at the John Carter Brown Library

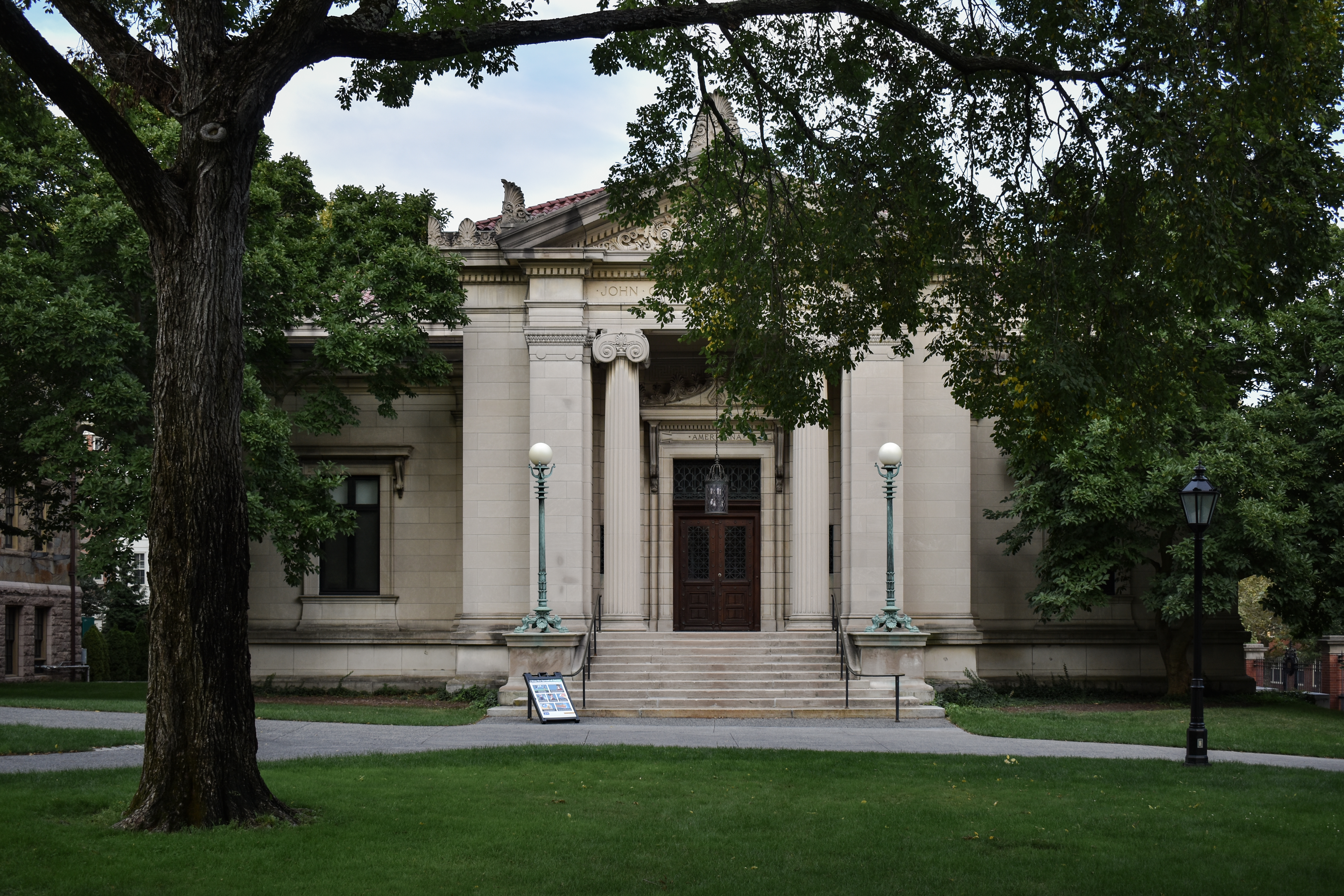
The John Carter Brown Library in 2020

== Scope and holdings ==
The collection of the John Carter Brown Library consists of more than 50,000 books written about both North and South America until roughly the end of the colonial era in the Americas, as well as around 16,000 specialized reference books providing supplementary information about the Library's holdings. The Library also holds a major collection of prints, manuscripts, and maps of the New World.

The collection of the John Carter Brown Library begins chronologically with fifteenth-century editions of Columbus's celebrated "letter" to the Spanish court announcing the discovery of lands to the west. The Library houses one of the largest collections of books printed in British North America before 1800, the world's most complete collection of Mexican works printed before 1600, the largest collection of printed works relating to Brazil before 1820, a collection of printed sources for the study of early Canada and the Caribbean, nearly three-quarters of all known imprints in the Native languages of North and South America from the colonial period, and the largest collection of political pamphlets produced at the time of the American revolution.

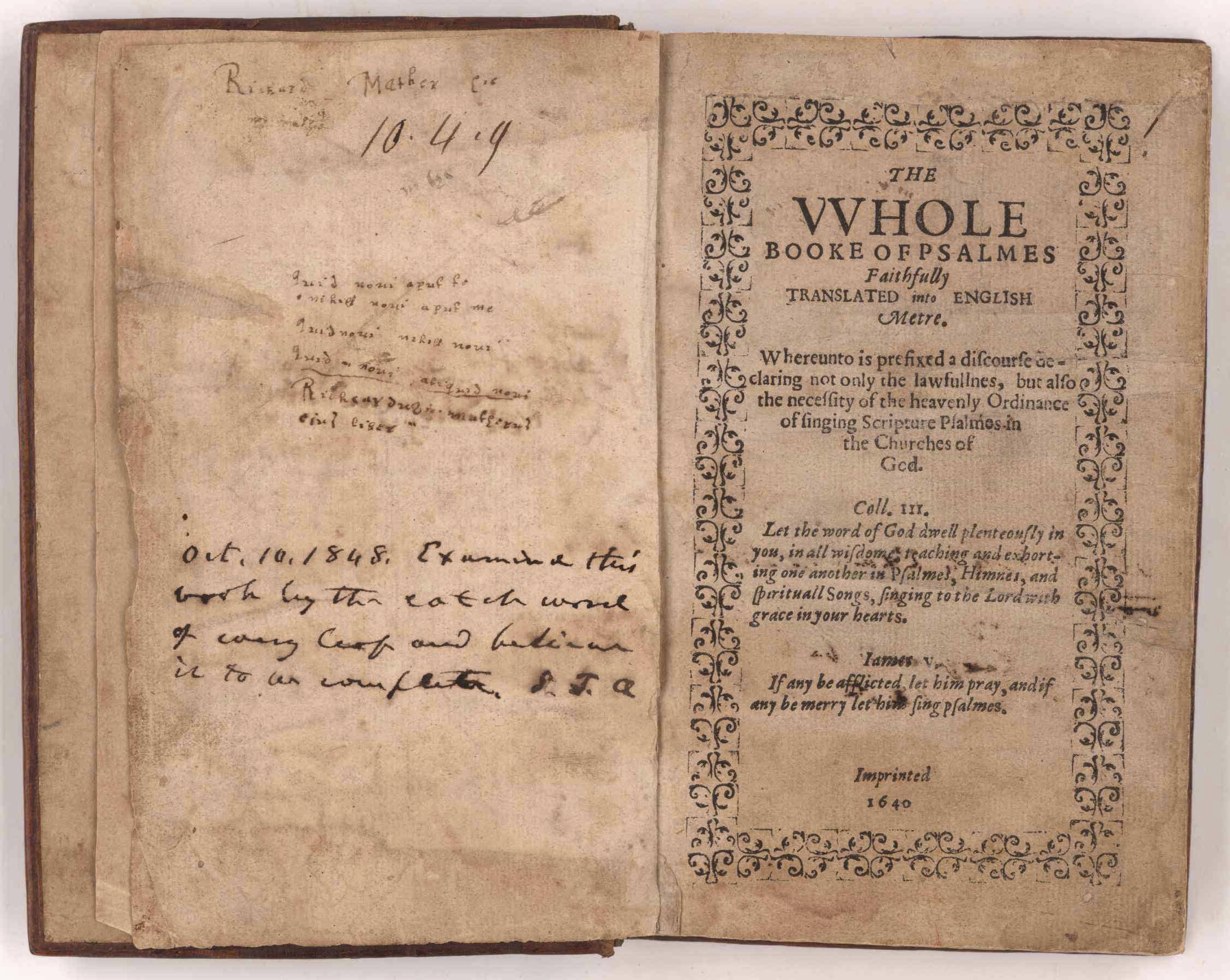
The JCB's copy of the Bay Psalm Book, owned by Richard Mather, and acquired by John Carter Brown in 1881

Collection highlights include the best preserved of eleven extant copies of Bay Psalm Book, the first book printed in British North America, a Shakespeare First Folio, leaves from the Gutenberg Bible, a copy of the first Bible printed in British North America, one of four surviving copies of Benjamin Franklin's A Dissertation on Liberty and Necessity, Pleasure and Pain, one of two copies of the hand-illustrated Tovar Codex, an important 16th-century source on Aztec culture, and a copy of Vocabulario en lengua castellana y mexicana, the first dictionary published in the New World.

The Library also holds many important maps and prints relating to the New World. These maps include one of the first printed attempts to depict America in cartographic form (the so-called Stevens-Brown map, a prototype of the 1513 Ptolemy Orbis Typus); the first printed map of Hernán Cortés’s Mexico City, built on the ruins of the Aztec capital, Tenochtitlán; the earliest known printed plan of a European settlement in what is now the United States (a plan of Fort Caroline built by Huguenot settlers in 1565 near present-day Jacksonville, Florida); and one of the earliest maps to show the French exploration of the Mississippi River, attributed to Louis Joliet.

In 2012, a group of Brown undergraduates and scholars deciphered an encoded essay in the hand of Roger Williams, scrawled in the marginalia of a book within the Library's holdings. This essay, thought to be Williams's last, concerns a theological debate on the nature of baptism and Indian conversion.

== The Archive of Early American Images ==
The Archive of Early American Images is drawn from the holdings of the John Carter Brown Library. The AEAI assists scholars in their quest for contemporary images to illustrate their research findings and to facilitate the study of historical images in their own right and in proper context. It is a unique resource for picture researchers, documentary filmmakers, and others looking for material for commercial use. Many of these American images come from books printed in the early modern period that have never been reproduced before.

As of August 2014, the database—which also includes a Map Collection, Political Cartoon Collection, and John Russell Bartlett Boundary Commission Collection—had about 11,270 images and is still growing. Images in this database are accompanied by extensive bibliographical and descriptive information and come from books in most European, and some Indigenous, languages from before c. 1825.

== Librarians ==
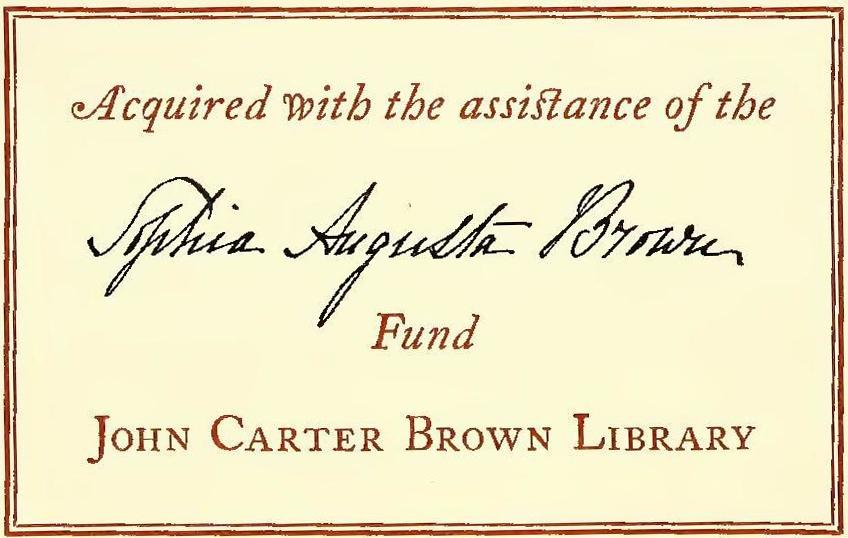
Bookplate of the "Sylvia Augusta Brown Fund" " from the John Carter Brown Library

Karin Wulf is the current Beatrice and Julio Mario Santo Domingo Director and Librarian of the library. Neil Safier was the Director and Librarian of the John Carter Brown Library from 2013 until 2021. Safier was preceded by: Edward L. Widmer (2006–2012); Norman Fiering (1983–2006); Thomas R. Adams (1958–1982); Lawrence C. Wroth (1924–1957); Worthington C. Ford (1917–1922); Champlin Burrage (1916); George Parker Winship (1895–1915).

== See also ==
- American Friends of the Hakluyt Society
- List of libraries in Rhode Island
