= Thomas Dublin =

American historian

- Education: Harvard University (BA); Columbia University (PhD)
- Awards: Bancroft Prize (1980)
- Scientific career
- Workplaces: Binghamton University; University of California, San Diego

Thomas Dublin is an American historian, editor and professor emeritus at Binghamton University. He is a social historian specialized in the working-class experience in the United States, particularly throughout New England and the Mid-Atlantic states.

== Life and career ==
Dublin graduated from Harvard College with a B.A. in chemistry and received his Ph.D. from Columbia University.

He serves as Distinguished Professor Emeritus of History at Binghamton University. He previously worked at the University of California, San Diego.

== Awards ==
- 1980 Bancroft Prize
- 1980 Merle Curti Award
- 2000 Guggenhein Fellowship
- 2006 Merle Curti Award
- 2006 Pennsylvania Historical Association Philip S. Klein Book Prize

== Works ==
=== Author ===
- Women at work: the transformation of work and community in Lowell, Massachusetts, 1826-1860. Columbia University Press. 1981. ISBN 978-0-231-04167-6.
- Transforming women's work: New England lives in the industrial revolution. Cornell University Press. 1994. ISBN 978-0-8014-2844-9.
- When the mines closed: stories of struggles in hard times. Cornell University Press. 1998. ISBN 978-0-8014-8467-4.
- The face of decline: the Pennsylvania anthracite region in the twentieth century. With Walter Licht. Cornell University Press. 2005. ISBN 978-0-8014-8473-5.

=== Editor ===
- Women and power in American history: to 1880. With Kathryn Kish Sklar. Prentice Hall. 1991. ISBN 978-0-13-962218-2.
- Farm to factory: women's letters, 1830-1860. Columbia University Press. 1993. ISBN 978-0-231-08157-3.
- Immigrant voices: new lives in America, 1773-1986. University of Illinois Press. 1993. ISBN 978-0-252-06290-2.
- Becoming American, becoming ethnic: college students explore their roots. Temple University Press. 1996. ISBN 978-1-56639-439-0.
