= Merle Curti Award =

The Merle Curti Award is awarded annually by the Organization of American Historians for the best book in American social and/or American intellectual history. It is named in honor of Merle Curti (1897–1996). A committee of 5 members of the Organization of American Historians chooses the winners from published monographs submitted by the author(s). Committee members represent the entire spectrum of American history and serve a one-year term. Beginning with the awards of 2004, the Committee may select 1 book "winner" in American intellectual history, 1 book "winner" in American social history, and may list other "finalists" in each field. "Winners" split a $1000 cash award. Although not explicitly stated, "American" refers to the "United States of America" alone.

Year	Winner	Title
1978	Henry F. May	The Enlightenment in America (Oxford University Press)
1979	Garry Wills	Inventing America: Jefferson's Declaration of Independence (Doubleday)
1980	Paul E. Johnson	A Shopkeeper's Millennium: Society and Revivals in Rochester, New York, 1815–1837 (Hill and Wang)
1980	Thomas Dublin	Women at Work: The Transformation of Work and Community in Lowell, Massachusetts, 1826–1860 (Columbia University Press)
1981	James T. Schleifer	The Making of Tocqueville's Democracy in America (University of North Carolina Press)
1982	George M. Fredrickson	White Supremacy: A Comparative Study of American and South African History (Oxford University Press)
1983	Norman Fiering	Moral Philosophy at Seventeenth-Century Harvard: A Discipline in Transition (Institute of Early American History and Culture/University of North Carolina Press) and Jonathan Edwards's Moral Thought and Its British Context (Institute of Early American History and Culture/University of North Carolina Press)
1984	Dino Cinel	From Italy to San Francisco: The Immigrant Experience (Stanford University Press)
1985	Leo P. Ribuffo	The Old Christian Right: The Protestant Far Right from the Great Depression to the Cold War (Temple University Press)
1986	Kerby A. Miller	Emigrants and Exiles: Ireland and the Irish Exodus to North America (Oxford University Press)
1987	James T. Kloppenberg	Uncertain Victory: Social Democracy and Progressivism in European and American Thought, 1870–1920 (Oxford University Press)
1988	Jacquelyn Dowd Hall, James L. Leloudis, Robert R. Korstad, Mary Murphy, Lu Ann Jones and Christopher B. Daly	Like a Family: The Making of a Southern Cotton Mill World (University of North Carolina Press)
1988	Marcus Rediker	Between the Devil and the Deep Blue Sea: Merchant Seamen, Pirates, and the Anglo-American Maritime World, 1700–1750 (Cambridge University Press)
1989	Edmund S. Morgan	Inventing the People: The Rise of Popular Sovereignty in England and America (W.W. Norton)
1990	James H. Merrell	The Indians' New World: Catawbas and Their Neighbors from European Contact through the Era of Removal (Omohundro Institute of Early American History and Culture/University of North Carolina Press)
1991	David D. Hall	Worlds of Wonder, Days of Judgment: Popular Religious Belief in Early New England (Knopf)
1991	John L. Brooke	The Heart of the Commonwealth: Society and Political Culture in Worcester County, Massachusetts, 1713–1861 (Cambridge University Press)
1992	David R. Roediger	The Wages of Whiteness: Race and the Making of the American Working Class (Verso)
1993	Robert B. Westbrook	John Dewey and American Democracy (Cornell University Press)
1994	W. Fitzhugh Brundage	Lynching in the New South: Georgia and Virginia, 1880–1930 (University of Illinois Press)
1995	Wilfred M. McClay	The Masterless: Self and Society in Modern America (University of North Carolina Press)
1996	George Chauncey	Gay New York: Gender, Urban Culture, and the Makings of the Gay Male World, 1890–1940 (Basic Books)
1997	Lance Banning	The Sacred Fire of Liberty: James Madison and the Founding of the Federal Republic (Cornell University Press)
1997	Ann Douglas	Terrible Honesty: Mongrel Manhattan in the 1920s (Farrar, Straus and Giroux)
1998	Robert A. Orsi	Thank You, St. Jude: Women's Devotion to the Patron Saint of Hopeless Causes (Yale University Press)
1999	Rogers M. Smith	Civic Ideals: Conflicting Visions of Citizenship in U.S. History (Yale University Press)
2000	Woody Holton	Forced Founders: Indians, Debtors, Slaves, and the Making of the American Revolution in Virginia (Omohundro Institute of Early American History and Culture/The University of North Carolina Press)
2001	Kimberly K. Smith	The Dominion of Voice: Riot, Reason, and Romance in Antebellum Politics (University Press of Kansas)
2002	David W. Blight	Race and Reunion: The Civil War in American Memory (Belknap Press of Harvard University Press)
2003	Helen Lefkowitz Horowitz	Rereading Sex: Battles over Sexual Knowledge and Suppression in Nineteenth-Century America (Knopf)
2004	Colin G. Calloway	One Vast Winter Count: The Native American West before Lewis and Clark (University of Nebraska Press)
2004	George M. Marsden	Jonathan Edwards: A Life (Yale University Press)
2004	Steven Hahn	A Nation under Our Feet: Black Political Struggles in the Rural South from Slavery to the Great Migration (Belknap Press of Harvard University Press)
2005	Steven Mintz	Huck's Raft: A History of American Childhood (Belknap Press of Harvard University Press)
2005	Michael O'Brien	Conjectures of Order: Intellectual Life and the American South, 1810–1860 (University of North Carolina Press)
2006	Elizabeth Borgwardt	A New Deal for the World: America's Vision for Human Rights (Belknap Press of Harvard University Press)
2006	Thomas Dublin and Walter Licht	The Face of Decline: The Pennsylvania Anthracite Region in the Twentieth Century (Cornell University Press)
2007	Scott Reynolds Nelson	Steel Drivin' Man: John Henry, the Untold Story of an American Legend (Oxford University Press)
2007	Moon-Ho Jung	Coolies and Cane: Race, Labor, and Sugar in the Age of Emancipation (Johns Hopkins University Press)
2008	Marcus Rediker	The Slave Ship: A Human History (Viking)
2009	Vincent Brown	The Reaper's Garden: Death and Power in the World of Atlantic Slavery (Harvard University Press)
2009	Pekka Hämäläinen	The Comanche Empire (Yale University Press)
2010	Laura Dassow Walls	The Passage to Cosmos: Alexander von Humboldt and the Shaping of America (University of Chicago Press)
2010	Seth Rockman	Scraping By: Wage Labor, Slavery, and Survival in Early Baltimore (Johns Hopkins University Press)
2011	Jefferson Cowie	Stayin' Alive: The 1970s and the Last Days of the Working Class (The New Press)
2011	Stephanie McCurry	Confederate Reckoning: Power and Politics in the Civil War South (Harvard University Press)
2012	Susan J. Pearson	The Rights of the Defenseless: Protecting Animals and Children in Gilded Age America (University of Chicago Press)
2012	Cindy Hahamovitch	No Man's Land: Jamaican Guestworkers in America and the Global History of Deportable Labor (Princeton University Press)
2013	Angus Burgin	The Great Persuasion: Reinventing Free Markets since the Great Depression (Harvard University Press)
2013	Brett Rushforth	Bonds of Alliance: Indigenous and Atlantic Slaveries in New France (Omohundro Institute of Early American History and Culture/University of North Carolina Press)
2014	W. Caleb McDaniel	The Problem of Democracy in the Age of Slavery: Garrisonian Abolitionists and Transatlantic Reform (Louisiana State University Press)
2014	Alan Taylor	The Internal Enemy: Slavery and War in Virginia, 1772–1832 (W.W. Norton)
2015	Kyle G. Volk	Moral Minorities and the Making of American Democracy (Oxford University Press)
2015	Cornelia H. Dayton and Sharon V. Salinger	Robert Love's Warnings: Searching for Strangers in Colonial Boston (University of Pennsylvania Press)
2016	Daniel Immerwahr	Thinking Small: The United States and the Lure of Community Development (Harvard University Press)
2016	Julie M. Weise	Corazón de Dixie: Mexicanos in the U.S. South since 1910 (University of North Carolina Press)
2017	Susanna L. Blumenthal	Law and the Modern Mind: Consciousness and Responsibility in American Legal Culture (Harvard University Press)
2017	Wendy Warren	New England Bound: Slavery and Colonization in Early America (Liveright/W.W. Norton)
2018	Brittney C. Cooper	Beyond Respectability: The Intellectual Thought of Race Women (University of Illinois Press)
2018	Tiya Miles	The Dawn of Detroit: A Chronicle of Slavery and Freedom in the City of the Straits (The New Press)
2019	Sarah E. Igo	The Known Citizen: A History of Privacy in Modern America (Harvard University Press)
2019	Amy Murrell Taylor	Embattled Freedom: Journeys through the Civil War's Slave Refugee Camps (The University of North Carolina Press)
2020	Stephanie Jones-Rogers	They Were Her Property: White Women as Slave Owners in the American South (Yale University Press)
2020	Katrina Forrester	In the Shadows of Justice: Postwar Liberalism and the Remaking of Political Philosophy (Princeton University Press)
2021	Garrett Felber	Those Who Know Don't Say: The Nation of Islam, the Black Freedom Movement, and the Carceral State (University of North Carolina Press)
2021	Johanna Fernández	The Young Lords: A Radical History (University of North Carolina Press)
2022	Emily Klancher Merchant	Building the Population Bomb (Oxford University Press)
2022	Samantha Seeley	Race, Removal, and the Right to Remain: Migration and the Making of the United States (Omohundro Institute and the University of North Carolina Press)
2023	Kathryn Gin Lum	Heathen: Religion and Race in American History (Harvard University Press)
2023	Laura F. Edwards	Only the Clothes on Her Back: Clothing and the Hidden History of Power in the Nineteenth- Century United States (Oxford University Press)
2024	Sheyda F.A. Jahanbani	The Poverty of the World: Discovering the Poor at Home and Abroad, 1935–1973 (Oxford University Press)
2024	Dylan Penningroth	Before the Movement: The Hidden History of Black Civil Rights (Liveright)
2025	Laura E. Helton	Scattered and Fugitive Things: How Black Collectors Created Archives and Remade History (Columbia University Press)
2025	Trish Kahle	Energy Citizenship: Coal and Democracy in the American Century (Columbia University Press)

== See also ==
- List of history awards
