= Susanna L. Blumenthal =

American law professor

- Awards: Merle Curti Award

Academic background
- Education: Harvard-Radcliffe College, Yale University

Academic work
- Discipline: Law
- Institutions: University of Minnesota

Susanna L. Blumenthal is the William Prosser Professor of Law and Professor of History at the University of Minnesota. She won the Merle Curti Award for her book Law and the Modern Mind.

== Life ==
She graduated from Radcliffe College, and from Yale University, where she earned a Ph.D. and JD.

Blumenthal's book Law and the Modern Mind won the Merle Curti Award and the International Society for the History of Behavioral and Social Sciences' Cheiron Book Prize.

== Works ==
- Law and the Modern Mind: Consciousness and Responsibility in American Legal Culture Cambridge : Harvard University Press, 2016. ISBN 9780674048935, OCLC 957012547
- How Not to Train Your Dragon, or Living Dangerously in the Law Stanford Law Review, May 2018
- "The Deviance of the Will: Policing the Bounds of Testamentary Freedom in Nineteenth-Century America", Harvard Law Review, v119 n4 (20060201): 959-1034
- "A Mania for Accumulation : The Plea of Moral Insanity in Gilded Age Will Contests" Making Legal History : Essays in Honor of William E. Nelson; NYU Press, ISBN 9780814708286
