= Stephanie Jones-Rogers =

American historian

Stephanie E. Jones-Rogers
- Title: Associate Professor of History, University of California, Berkeley

Academic background
- Education: Rutgers University

Academic work
- Discipline: Historian
- Main interests: African-American history, history of Slavery in the United States, and women's and gender history.
- Notable works: They Were Her Property

Stephanie E. Jones-Rogers is an American historian. She is an associate professor of history at the University of California, Berkeley, and the author of They Were Her Property: White Women as Slave Owners in the American South. She is an expert in African-American history, the history of American slavery, and women's and gender history.

== Education ==
Jones-Rogers attended Rutgers University, earning a BA in Psychology in 2003, and a Masters in 2007. She was awarded a PhD in History in 2012. Her doctoral thesis was "Nobody couldn't sell'em but her" slaveowning women, mastery, and the gendered politics of the antebellum slave market. Her PhD was supervised by Deborah Gray White and examined by Thavolia Glymph. In 2013, her doctoral research won the Lerner-Scott Prize, which is given annually by the Organization of American Historians for the best doctoral dissertation in U.S. women's history.

== Career ==
Jones-Rogers began her career at the University of Iowa as assistant professor in the departments of History and Women, Gender, and Sexuality Studies. She was a Post-doctoral Fellow in Law and Society at Tulane University, 2013–14. She held the Harrington Faculty Fellowship in the History Department at the University of Texas-Austin, 2018–19. She has won fellowships from the Hellman Foundation, the National Endowment for the Humanities, the Ford Foundation, and the Woodrow Wilson Foundation.

Her first book was published in 2019 by Yale University Press. They Were Her Property challenges previous depictions of white antebellum women as only minimally involved in the institution of slavery, onlookers to male relatives' active practice of enslaving African-Americans. Jones-Rogers draws on court records and oral histories to show the active role white women play in enslavement, both on a day-to-day basis and in the buying and selling of slaves, for their personal economic gain. Jones-Rogers demonstrates that white women exercised extraordinary control over the enslaved people in their households and had a deep economic investment in slavery. The book was described as 'scrupulous', 'focused', and 'crisp'.

== Current projects ==
As of 2022, her research tends to focuses on gender and American slavery as well as colonial and 19th century legal and economic history with a focal point on women, systems of bondage, and the slave trade. They are also currently working on the manuscript Women of the Trade as well as Women, American Slavery, and the Law. She also has a study called the "'She had...a Womb Subjected to Bondage': The Afro-Atlantic Origins of British Colonial Descent Law". Rogers also is in charge of the Department of History's first African and African-American History Writer's Workshop. They work towards providing opportunities to scholars to circulate their research in a conducive environment. Another purpose of this Workshop is to cultivate the African-descended community of scholars within the department and offer a means of connecting them with one another.

== Research interests ==
- African-American history
- Slavery and the Atlantic Slave Trade
- Slavery and the Law
- The History of Women
- Women and Early American Law

== Awards and honors ==
They Were Her Property won the L.A. Times Book Prize in History in 2020. Jones-Rogers was the first African American and the third woman to receive the Prize in History.

The book was also shortlisted for the 2020 Lincoln Prize in February 2020, with seven other books chosen out of 110 submissions. It won the Merle Curti Social History Award 2020 for the best book in American social history.

Jones-Rogers was awarded the Organization of American Historians Lerner-Scott Dissertation Prize in U.S. Women's History in 2013.

In February 2023, Jones-Rogers received the $300,000 Dan David Prize–the largest financial reward for excellence in the historical discipline in the world.

== Fellowships and grants ==
- Harrington Faculty Fellow, Department of History, University of Texas, Austin, 2018-2019
- American Association of University Women Post-Doctoral Fellowship (Declined)
- National Endowment for the Humanities Fellowship for University Teachers, 2017-2018
- Ford Foundation Post-Doctoral Fellowship, 2017-2018
- Woodrow Wilson Foundation Career Enhancement Fellowship for Junior Faculty, 2017
- Humanities Research Fellowship, University of California, Berkeley, 2017-2018
- Hellman Fellows Fund Award, 2016
- Regents' Junior Faculty Fellowship, University of California, Berkeley, 2015
- Institute of International Studies Manuscript Mini-Conference Grant, University of California, Berkeley, 2015
- Arts and Humanities Initiative Standard Grant, University of Iowa, 2013-2014
- College of Liberal Arts & Sciences Old Gold Summer Fellowship, University of Iowa, 2013-2014
- Andrew W. Mellon Foundation Small Summer Research Grant, Rutgers University, 2011
- Pre-Doctoral Leadership Development Institute Fellowship, Rutgers University, 2010-2011
- Rutgers Center for Historical Analysis Graduate Student Fellowship, Rutgers University, 2010-2011
- Andrew W. Mellon Foundation Small Summer Research Grant, Rutgers University, 2010
- Ford Foundation Dissertation Fellowship-Honorable Mention, 2010 Competition
- Graduate Assistantship, Center for Race and Ethnicity, Rutgers University, 2009-2010
- Ralph Johnson Bunche Distinguished Graduate Award, Rutgers University, 2007
- Louis Bevier Graduate Fellowship (Finalist/Alternate), Rutgers University, 2007

== Web-based publications ==
- "Slavery's Abolition: Dark and Bittersweet", Abolition Democracy 13/13, Columbia University School of Law Center for Contemporary Critical Thought, November 8, 2020.
- "1662: Virginia's Act XII", in "21 Lessons From America's Worst Moments", Time.com, June 25, 2020.
- "White Women and the Economy of Slavery", Not Even Past, February 1, 2019.
- "Police shootings: How many more must perish before we see justice?", The Berkeley Blog, July 27, 2017.
- "Another Side to the Tubman Twenty", The Berkeley Blog, April 26, 2016.
- "A Thousand Words, Countless Silences and the Audacity of Black Love", The Berkeley Blog, March 31, 2016.
- "The Charleston Massacre: What is the Meaning of Black Life in America?", The Berkeley Blog, July 13, 2015.
- "Rachel Dolezal's 'Deception': What We Don't Want to Know about Racial Identity in America", The Berkeley Blog, June 29, 2015.

== Bibliography ==
- [S]he could. . .spare one ample breast for the profit of her owner': white mothers and enslaved wet nurses' invisible labor in American slave markets', Motherhood, childlessness and the care of children in Atlantic slave societies, edited by Camillia Cowling, Maria Helena Pereira Toledo Machado, Diana Paton and Emily West (London: Routledge, 2020)
- They Were Her Property. White Women as Slave Owners in the American South (Yale University Press, 2019)
- "Rethinking Sexual Violence and the Marketplace of Slavery: White Women, the Slave Market and Enslaved People's Sexualized Bodies in the Nineteenth-Century South", Sexuality and Slavery: Reclaiming Intimate Histories in the Americas edited by Daina Ramey Berry and Leslie Harris (Athens: University of Georgia Press, 2018), 109–123
- "Mistresses in the Making: White Girls, Mastery and the Practice of Slaveownership in the Nineteenth-Century South", Women's America, Volume 8: Refocusing the Past. edited by Linda Kerber, Jane Sherron De Hart, Cornelia Hughes Dayton, and Judy Wu (New York: Oxford University Press, 2015)
- "If Only Trayvon Had Freedom Papers", History News Network, 16 July 2013:
