= Henry F. May =

American historian (1915–2012)

- Born: Henry Farnum May; March 27, 1915; Denver, Colorado, U.S.
- Died: September 29, 2012 (aged 97)
- Education: University of California, Berkeley (BA); Harvard University (MA, PhD)
- Occupations: Historian; professor
- Spouse: Jean Louise Terrace (m. 1941)
- Children: 2
- Parent(s): Henry F. May; May Rickard
- Awards: Merle Curti Award (1978)

Henry Farnum May (March 27, 1915 – September 29, 2012) was an American historian and Margaret Byrne Professor of History at the University of California, Berkeley.

== Biography ==
Henry May was the son of Henry F. May, a lawyer, and May (Rickard) May. Born in Denver, Colorado, he was reared in Berkeley, California, and spent a formative year in Europe with his family as the youngest of three children. He married Jean Louise Terrace on June 18, 1941, and they had two children. He earned a B.A. from the University of California, Berkeley (1937) and an M.A. (1938) and a Ph.D. (1947) from Harvard University. May was an instructor of history at Lawrence College from 1941 to 1942, and from 1942 to 1945, he served as a Japanese language translator in the United States Navy Reserve. He was an assistant professor, and then associate professor, at Scripps College from 1947 to 1949 and taught as a visiting associate professor at Bowdoin College from 1950 to 1951. He taught at Berkeley from 1952 until his retirement in 1980, serving as chairman of the history department during the Free Speech Movement of 1964. May's works primarily address American intellectual and religious history, but he also wrote about his youth in Berkeley and his experiences as a graduate student at Harvard during the 1930s.

Two of May’s books helped define scholarly discussion. The End of American Innocence: A Study of the First Years of Our Own Time, 1912-1917, published in 1959, "argued that the cultural rebellions of the 1920s were well underway before World War I and that these rebellions were less dependent upon the war’s impact than earlier scholars had assumed." The Enlightenment in America (1976), which won the Merle Curti Award of the Organization of American Historians, proposed that the Protestant culture of late-18th century America was "strikingly different from its European equivalents." May was honored by the Organization of American Historians with its Distinguished Service Award in 1997. He was also an elected Fellow of the American Academy of Arts and Sciences.

May's papers are held by the University of California, Berkeley.

== Awards ==
- 1970 Guggenheim Fellowship
- 1978 Merle Curti Award

== Bibliography ==
- Protestant Churches and Industrial America (Harper Torchbooks, 1949)
- The End of American Innocence: A Study of the First Years of Our Own Time, 1912-1917 (New York: Knopf, 1959)
- The Enlightenment in America. Oxford University Press. 1976. ISBN 978-0-19-502367-1.
- Coming to Terms: A Study in Memory and History (University of California Press, 1987)
- The Divided Heart: Essays on Protestantism and the Enlightenment in America. Oxford University Press. 1991. ISBN 978-0-19-505899-4.
