= They Were Her Property =

2019 non-fiction book by Stephanie Jones-Rogers

They Were Her Property: White Women as Slave Owners in the American South
- Author: Stephanie Jones-Rogers
- Language: English
- Subject: History, women's studies, business & economics, 19th century, American-American studies
- Publisher: Yale University Press
- Publication date: February 19, 2019
- Publication place: United States
- Media type: Print & Digital
- Pages: 296 (hardcover first edition)
- Awards: Los Angeles Times Book Prize, Merle Curti Social History Award
- ISBN: 9780300218664
- Website: https://www.stephaniejonesrogers.com/book

They Were Her Property: White Women as Slave Owners in the American South is a nonfiction history book by Stephanie Jones-Rogers. They Were Her Property is "the first extensive study of the role of Southern white women in the plantation economy and slave-market system" and disputes conventional wisdom that white women played a passive or minimal role in slaveholding. It was published by Yale University Press and released on February 19, 2019. For the book Jones-Rogers received the Los Angeles Times Book Prize and the Merle Curti Social History Award from the Organization of American Historians.

== Synopsis ==
They Were Her Property disputes the idea that white women did not play a significant role in slaveholding in the American south. Jones-Rogers uses primary source documents to illustrate the scope and conduct of white women slaveholders, including testimonials of formerly enslaved people archived by the Federal Writers' Project, and bills of sales for enslaved people bought and sold by white women. The author stated that around 40% of bills of sales from South Carolina in the 18th century included either a female buyer or seller.

Jones-Rogers argues that white women were socialized to become plantation mistresses from girlhood through various social norms and often exacted cruelty and sexual violence onto enslaved people. The book addresses the widely held belief that white women were gentler to enslaved people than white men, and dispels the notion of the "Jealous Mistress" who is angry that her husband has sex with enslaved women.

Jones-Rogers contends that slaveholding was a key mechanism for white women to build wealth and maintain financial independence from their future husbands, and they skirted losing enslaved people to their husbands through various legal tools.

== Awards and nominations ==
- Los Angeles Times Book Prize, Los Angeles Times (2019)
- Merle Curti Social History Award, Organization of American Historians (2020)
- Lincoln Prize finalist, Gettysburg College and the Gilder Lehrman Institute of American History (2020)

== Critical reception ==
The book received positive critical reception. In a review for The Washington Post, Elizabeth R. Varon wrote: "In holding slave-owning women to account, Jones-Rogers has provided a brilliant, innovative analysis of American slavery, one that sets a new standard for scholarship on the subject." Parul Sehgal stated for The New York Times: "Jones-Rogers is a crisp and focused writer. She trains her gaze on the history and rarely considers slavery’s reverberations. They are felt on every page, however."

Jeff Forret said in his review for Southwestern Historical Quarterly: "Jones-Rogers offers a bold reinterpretation of the relationship between slavery and slave-owning women in the nineteenth-century South. The prose in They Were Her Property is strong and clear, containing no shortage of appalling stories of the violence and cruelty endemic to southern slavery."

== Publication ==
- Jones-Rogers, Stephanie E. (2019-02-19). They Were Her Property: White Women as Slave Owners in the American South. Yale University Press. ISBN 9780300218664.
