= Anne Norton =

American political scientist (born 1954)

- Born: 1954 (age 71–72)

Academic background
- Education: University of Chicago (BA, PhD)

Anne Norton (born 1954) is an American political scientist and a Professor Emerita of Political Science at the University of Pennsylvania.

== Career ==
=== Academics ===
Norton studied political theory at the University of Chicago where she completed her BA and later her PhD in 1982. She has held academic positions at University of Notre Dame, Princeton University, and The University of Texas at Austin. Since 1993, she has been a faculty member at the University of Pennsylvania.

Norton's central intellectual interest has been the meaning and consequences of political identity. She has explored this theme in two books on American politics and one on the concept of political identity itself, drawing on work in the areas of anthropology and semiotics (Norton 1986, 1993, 1988). She has also written a wide-ranging critique of the current practice of the social sciences, particularly political science (Norton, 2004).

In a 1995 essay, Norton criticizes Hannah Arendt's writing about Africans and African-Americans. She states: "Arendt gave a voice to the Boer. She left the African silent.”

While Norton was a student at the University of Chicago, she encountered many Straussians, i.e. people who were influenced by the ideas of the university's former professor Leo Strauss. In Leo Strauss and the Politics of American Empire (2004), Norton writes about Strauss's impact on neoconservatives, alleging that many have misapplied his ideas, particularly in regards to US foreign policy towards Iraq and Israel. Historian Arthur Schlesinger, Jr. praised the book as an accurate account of the intellectual origins of US foreign policy, while Charles Butterworth and Clifford Orwin wrote that the book misinterprets Strauss's ideas.

In her book On the Muslim Question (2013), Norton writes about Western societies' debate regarding how to treat Muslims and compares it to their debate about how to treat Jews in the 19th century. Norton criticizes the idea that Islam and the West are engaged in a "Clash of Civilizations" and unable to co-exist. According to anthropologist Lawrence Rosen, Norton's book provides an insufficient proposal for how Western societies should address their differences with Muslims. Elsewhere, Norton has credited discrimination and state violence with contributing to violent acts committed by some Muslims.

=== Views ===
In 2021, Norton's student Mackenzie Fierceton was investigated by the university for misrepresenting her family background in her Rhodes Scholarship application. Norton supported Fierceton throughout the investigation and criticized the university's treatment of Fierceton, alleging that it had defamed and harmed her.

During the Gaza war protests, Norton was named in a letter to the University of Pennsylvania administration from 200 alumni. The letter asked that Norton and seven other professors be investigated for antisemitism. Norton tweeted: "Those who accuse me of antisemitism rely on — and perpetuate — a complete erasure of Palestinians".

== Selected publications ==
=== Books ===
- Wild Democracy: Anarchy, Courage, and Ruling the Law, Oxford University Press, 2023.
- On the Muslim Question. Princeton University Press, 2013.
- Leo Strauss and the Politics of American Empire. Yale University Press, 2004.
- Reflections on Political Identity Johns Hopkins University Press, 1988.
- Alternative Americas University of Chicago Press, 1986.
- Republic of Signs University of Chicago Press, 1993.
- Bloodrites of the Poststructuralists Routledge, 2003.
- 95 Theses on Politics, Culture & Method Yale University Press, 2004.

=== Articles ===
- Review of The Persistence of the Palestinian Question: Essays on Zionism and the Palestinians, by Joseph A. Massad. Journal of Palestine Studies, 36, no. 2 (2007): 89–90. doi:10.1525/jps.2007.36.2.89
- "Heart of Darkness: Africa and African Americans in the Writings of Hannah Arendt". In Honig, Bonnie (ed.) Feminist Interpretations of Hannah Arendt. Pennsylvania State University Press, 1995. ISBN 978-0-271-01446-3
- “Gender, Sexuality and the Iraq of Our Imagination.” Middle East Report, no. 173 (1991): 26–28. doi:10.2307/3012628
