= Susan J. Pearson =

American historian

- Children: 2
- Awards: Merle Curti Award

Academic background
- Education: BA, Women's Studies, 1996, Oberlin College; MA, 1999, PhD, 2004, University of North Carolina at Chapel Hill
- Thesis: The rights of the defenseless: animals, children, and sentimental liberalism in nineteenth-century America (2004)

Susan Jennifer Pearson is an American historian of the nineteenth and early twentieth centuries. As an associate professor at Northwestern University, she received the 2012 Merle Curti Award for her book The Rights of the Defenseless: Protecting Animals and Children in Gilded Age America.

== Early life ==
Pearson earned her Bachelor of Arts degree from Oberlin College before enrolling at the University of North Carolina at Chapel Hill for her Master's degree and PhD.

== Career ==
Upon receiving her PhD in 2004, Pearson joined the Department of History at Northwestern University as an assistant professor. In this role, she published her first book titled The Rights of the Defenseless: Protecting Animals and Children in Gilded Age America, which received the 2012 Merle Curti Award. The book focused on the history of child and animal protective services working together in the nineteenth century to protect youth and animals from abuse. Following the publication of the book, Pearson received a yearlong National Endowment for the Humanities Fellowship for her project A History of Birth Registration in America. The project was later retitled as Registering Birth: Population and Personhood in American History and she received a Charles A. Ryskamp Research Fellowship from the American Council of Learned Societies. In 2015, she published Age Ought to Be a Fact: The Campaign against Child Labor and the Rise of the Birth Certificate, which discussed the difficulty states face when enforcing child labor laws due to lack of access to birth records.

== Personal life ==
Pearson is divorced and has two children.
