= Norman Fiering =

American historian (born 1935)

- Born: 1935 (age 90–91); New York City, U.S.
- Education: Dartmouth College, 1956 B.A. Columbia University, 1969 Ph.D.
- Occupation: American historian
- Spouse: Renée Fiering
- Children: 3 children
- Website: http://www.normanfiering.net/

Norman Fiering (born 1935 in New York City) is an American historian, and Director and Librarian, emeritus, of the John Carter Brown Library.

== Life ==
He graduated from Dartmouth College in 1956, where he was a student of Eugen Rosenstock-Huessy, and from Columbia University with a Ph.D. in 1969.

He taught at Stanford University between 1964 and 1969, and was a post-doctoral fellow for three years at the Institute of Early American History and Culture in Williamsburg, Virginia, 1969–1972. In 1972 he was appointed Editor of Publications at the institute. From 1983 to 2006, he was Director and Librarian of the John Carter Brown Library at Brown University.

== Awards ==
- Omohundro Institute of Early American History and Culture Fellowship
- 1975-76 National Endowment for the Humanities Fellowship
- 1978-79 National Humanities Center Fellowship in Research Triangle Park, North Carolina
- 1983 Merle Curti Award

== Bibliography ==
=== Books ===
- Moral Philosophy at Seventeenth-Century Harvard: A Discipline in Transition, University of North Carolina Press. 1981
- Jonathan Edwards's Moral Thought and Its British Context, University of North Carolina Press. 1981
- A Guide to Book Publication for Historians (Washington, D. C.: American Historical Assn.), 1979, pamphlet, 40 pp.
- "Understanding Rosenstock-Huessy: A Haphazard Collection of Ventures", Wipf and Stock, 2022
- "James Logan's 'The Duties of Man As They May Be Deduced from Nature': An Analysis of the Unpublished Manuscript, American Philosophical Society, 2022

=== Articles ===
- "President Samuel Johnson and the Circle of Knowledge," William and Mary Quarterly, XXVIII (April 1971), 199–236.
- "Solomon Stoddard's Library at Harvard in 1664," Harvard Library Bulletin (July 1972), 255–269.
- "Will and Intellect in the New England Mind," William and Mary Quarterly, XXIX (Oct. 1972), 515–558. (Best article award, William and Mary Quarterly, 1972).
- "A Reply to George Steiner," Visible Language, VI (Summer, 1972), 218–222.
- "Irresistible Compassion: An Aspect of Eighteenth-Century Sympathy and Humanitarianism," Journal of the History of Ideas, XXXVII (April 1976), 195–218.
- "Editing the Historian's First Book," The Maryland Historian, VII (Spring 1976), 61–69.
- "The Transatlantic Republic of Letters: A Note on the Circulation of Learned Periodicals to Early

Eighteenth-Century America," William and Mary Quarterly, XXXIII (Oct. 1976), 642–660.

- "Early American Philosophy vs. Philosophy in Early America," Transactions of the Charles S. Peirce Society, XIII (Summer 1977), 216–237.
- "Benjamin Franklin and the Way to Virtue," American Quarterly, XXX (July 1978), 199–223.
- "The First American Enlightenment: Tillotson, Leverett, and Philosophical Anglicanism," New England Quarterly, LIV (Sept. 1981), 307–334. (Winner of the Walter Muir Whitehill Prize, Col. Society of Massachusetts).
- "Comment on Thomas Tanselle's, 'The Bibliography and Textual Study of American Books," American Antiquarian Society Proceedings, XCV, Part I (Worcester, Mass.), 1985, 152–160.
- "The Rationalist Foundations of Jonathan Edwards's Metaphysics," in Nathan O. Hatch and Harry S. Stout, Jonathan Edwards and the American Experience (Oxford U. Press, 1989) ISBN 978-0-19-506077-5
- "Philosophy" in the three-volume Encyclopedia of the North American Colonies, ed. Jacob E. Cooke (New York, 1993).

=== Edited ===
- Edward G. Gray; Norman Fiering, eds. (2000). The Language Encounter in the Americas, 1492-1800. New York: Berghahn Books. ISBN 978-1-57181-210-0.
- Paolo Bernardini; Norman Fiering, eds. (2001). The Jews and the Expansion of Europe to the West, 1450 to 1800. New York: Berghahn Books. ISBN 978-1-57181-430-2.
- David Patrick Geggus; Norman Fiering, eds. (2009). The World of the Haitian Revolution. Indiana University Press. ISBN 978-0-253-35232-3.
- "Time Bettering Days and Other Essays by Eugen Rosenstock-Huessy," edited by Norman Fiering,

Wipf and Stock, 2025.
