= Elizabeth Borgwardt =

American historian, and lawyer

Elizabeth Kopelman Borgwardt (born 1965) is an American historian, and lawyer. She is an associate professor at Washington University in St. Louis.

== Life ==
She graduated from Cambridge University with a BA and M.Phil., from Harvard Law School, with a J.D., and from Stanford University with a Ph.D. She worked as a mediator and arbitrator, and was a senior fellow at the Center for Conflict and Negotiation at Stanford University. She also worked on the Michael Dukakis 1988 presidential campaign. On June 26, 1993, she married Kurt Borgwardt. She is an associate professor of history and law in Arts and Sciences at Washington University in St. Louis.

== Fellowships ==
- Spring 2012 University of Chicago, Richard and Ann Pozen Professor of Human Rights (Visiting)
- 2010 Visiting Fellow, Center for Advanced Study in the Behavioral Sciences, Stanford University
- 2009 Fulbright Visiting Professor, University of Heidelberg, Center for American Studies
- Spring 2008, Fulbright Distinguished Lecturer, University of Heidelberg, Center for American Studies
- 2004-2012 Distinguished Lecturer, Organization of American Historians
- 2003-2004 Visiting Scholar, Center for the Study of Law & Society, University of California at Berkeley
- 2001-2002 Samuel Golieb Fellow in Legal History, New York University School of Law
- 1999 Stuart L. Bernath Dissertation Research Grant
- 1998 Ford Foundation "Human Rights" Fellow

== Awards and honors ==
- 2010 James E. McCleod Faculty Appreciation Award, Washington University in St. Louis
- November 2010 Distinguished Graduate Award, Noble & Greenough School
- 2009 Stuart L. Bernath Lecture Prize, Society of Historians of American Foreign Relations
- 2008 Gustavus Myers Center for the Study of Bigotry and Human Rights Outstanding Book Award
- 2006 Murle Curti Book Award, the Organization of American Historians
- 2006 Stuart L. Bernath Book Prize (co-winner), the Society for Historians of American Foreign Relations
- 2006 Best Book Award, Any Historical Topic, Phi Alpha Theta History Honor Society
- 2006 Merle Curti Award
- 2006 Robert F. Kennedy Foundation Book Award Finalist
- 2006 Gustavus Myers Center Outstanding Book Award, Honorable Mention, for A New Deal for the World
- 2006 Nominee, Pulitzer Prize in History, for A New Deal for the World
- 2004 Elizabeth Spilman Rosenfield Dissertation Prize, Stanford University Department of History
- 1998 Littleton-Griswold Dissertation Research Award for Legal History, American Historical Association

== Works ==
- A New Deal for the World: America's Vision for Human Rights. Harvard University Press. 2005. ISBN 978-0-674-01874-7.
- Andrea Kupfer Schneider; Brian Ganson; Elizabeth Borgwardt (January 1, 1997). Coping with International Conflict: A Systematic Approach to Influence in International Negotiation. Prentice Hall. ISBN 978-0-13-591637-7.
- Elizabeth Kopelman; Roger Fisher; Andrea Kupfer Schneider (1994). Beyond Machiavelli: Tools for Coping with Conflict. Harvard University Press. ISBN 978-0-14-024522-6.
