= John L. Brooke =

American historian

- Born: 1953 (age 72–73)
- Awards: Merle Curti Award; Bancroft Prize; Guggenheim Fellowship

Academic background
- Education: Cornell University; University of Pennsylvania

Academic work
- Discipline: Historian
- Institutions: Franklin & Marshall College; Amherst College; Tufts University; Ohio State University

John L. Brooke (born 1953) is an American historian specializing in early American history and global environmental history. He is Professor Emeritus of History at The Ohio State University.

He is known for studies in public culture and society in the early history of the United States and for advancing the synthesis of climate science, disease history, and earth-systems analysis, with human history. His work has been supported by the National Endowment for the Humanities, the Guggenheim Foundation, and the American Council of Learned Societies, and has received numerous awards, including the Bancroft Prize in American History and Diplomacy, The Merle Curti Prize, the SHEAR Book Prize, and the Theodore C. Blegen Award.

== Biography ==
Brooke graduated from Cornell University in 1975, and from the University of Pennsylvania, with an M.A. and Ph.D. in 1982.

=== Career ===
Brooke began his academic career teaching at Franklin & Marshall College and Amherst College before joining the faculty at Tufts University in 1983. At Tufts, he rose from assistant professor to professor and later held the Arthur Jr. & Lenore Stern Chair of History. At Tufts he served briefly as department chair and Director of the Archaeology Program.

In 2001, Brooke joined The Ohio State University, where he was an Arts & Sciences Distinguished Professor, and held the Warner Woodring Chair in American History. He served as President of the President, Society for Historians of the Early American Republic in 2007-2008.

He also held a courtesy appointment in the Department of Anthropology from 2013 to 2023. From 2011 to 2022, he was Director of the Ohio State Center for Historical Research, where he led major interdisciplinary initiatives on disease, health and environment, global state formations, slavery and race in America, and crisis and uncertainty.

Brooke retired from Ohio State as Professor Emeritus in 2023 but continues to publish and participate in scholarly research and collaborative projects.

=== Research and scholarly work ===
Brooke’s research spans early American history and global environmental history. His earlier work on Massachusetts, New York, and the rise of Mormonism extended the community studies framework into the study of material culture, political ideology, and religion. His Bancroft Prize–winning work, The Refiner’s Fire, examines the origins of Mormon theology and is widely regarded as a significant contribution to American religious history. This study informed a broader body of scholarship that situates early American society within the framework of Jürgen Habermas’s concept of the public sphere. This work culminated in two books, Columbia Rising: Civil Life on the Upper Hudson from the Revolution to the Age of Jackson (2010), and "There Is a North": Fugitive Slaves, Political Crisis, and Cultural Transformation in the Coming of the Civil War (2019). Columbia Rising examines the struggle over citizenship in civil society in one particularly volatile county in the early republic.“There is a North” details how the cultural and political impact of Harriet Beecher Stowe’s Uncle Tom’s Cabin, which can be characterized as an early example of a modern media event in the public sphere, shaped opinion in the northern United States during the decade leading to the American Civil War.

He has taught global environmental history for approximately three decades, developing a synthetic approach that situates human history within earth-system contexts, with particular attention to climate change and epidemic disease, published in his 2014 Climate Change and the Course of Global History: A Rough Journey. His scholarship has contributed to the advancement of environmental history by integrating perspectives from climate science, genetics, archaeology, and epidemiology.

A recurring theme in his work is the deep history of disease, including research on the origins and spread of the bubonic plague, which he addressed in his 2018 Astor Lecture at the University of Oxford.

In addition, he has explored the historical role of agricultural greenhouse gas emissions in the emergence of anthropogenic climate change, including the Blegen Award-winning article “The Plantation Carbon Complex,” co-authored with Eric Herschthal.

== Awards ==
- 1990, American Council of Learned Societies Fellowship.
- 1991 Merle Curti Award for Intellectual History from the Organization of American Historians
- National Historical Society Book Prize
- 1995 Bancroft Prize
- 1995, 2010 Society of Historians of the Early American Republic Book Prize
- 1997 Guggenheim Fellow
- 1986, 1997 National Endowment for the Humanities fellowship
- 2010, Dixon Ryan Fox Manuscript Prize, New York State Historical Association
- 2010, H. H. Lehman Prize for Distinguished Scholarship, New York Academy of History
- 2025 Theodore C. Blegen Award, Forest History Society for “The Plantation Carbon Complex,” shared with Eric Herschthal.

== Works ==
- The Heart of the Commonwealth: Society and Political Culture in Worcester County Massachusetts, 1713-1861. Cambridge University Press. 1989. ISBN 978-0-521-67339-6. (2nd edition 2005)
- The Refiner's Fire: The Making of Mormon Cosmology, 1644-1844. Cambridge University Press. 1994. ISBN 978-0-521-56564-6.
- Columbia Rising: Civil Life on the Upper Hudson from the Revolution to the Age of Jackson_. University of North Carolina Press. 2010. doi:10.5149/9780807838877_brooke ISBN 978-0-8078-3323-0
- Climate Change and the Course of Global History: A Rough Journey. Cambridge University Press. 2014. ISBN 978-0-521-69218-2.
- Brooke, John L. (2019). "There Is a North": Fugitive Slaves, Political Crisis, and Cultural Transformation in the Coming of the Civil War. Project Muse. Amherst: University of Massachusetts Press. ISBN 978-1-62534-447-2.
