= Wendy Warren =

American historian

- Born: San Diego, California, US

Academic background
- Education: M.A., M.Phil, Ph.D, history, 2008, Yale University
- Thesis: Enslaved Africans in New England, 1638-1700 (2008)

Academic work
- Institutions: Princeton University
- Notable works: New England Bound: Slavery and Colonization in Early America

Wendy Anne Warren is an American historian. Her book New England Bound won a Merle Curti Award and was a finalist for the Pulitzer Prize for History. She is also an associate professor of history at Princeton University.

== Education ==
Warren was born and raised in San Diego, California. She attended Yale University for her Master's degree and PhD.

== Career ==
Warren joined the faculty at Princeton University after completing a junior research fellowship at the University of Oxford. From 2014 until 2017, she held the university's Philip and Beulah Rollins Preceptorship in the Department of History. In her final year of the preceptorship, she published New England Bound: Slavery and Colonization in Early America through Boni & Liveright. The idea for the book came to her as a doctoral student at Yale, when she came across a 17th century account of the rape of a New England slave. It won the 2017 Merle Curti Award as the best book published in American social history and was a finalist for the Pulitzer Prize for History.

Following the publication of her book, Warren was promoted to associate professor and received the Frederick Burkhardt Fellowship from the American Council of Learned Societies.
