= Leo P. Ribuffo =

American historian (1945–2018)

- Born: Leo Paul Ribuffo; September 23, 1945; Paterson, New Jersey, U.S.
- Died: November 27, 2018 (aged 73)
- Occupation: Historian
- Awards: Merle Curti Award (1985)

Academic background
- Education: Rutgers University (BA); Yale University (PhD)

Leo Paul Ribuffo (September 23, 1945 – November 27, 2018) was an American historian. He was Society of the Cincinnati George Washington Distinguished Professor at George Washington University.

== Life ==
Born in Paterson, New Jersey, in 1945, Ribuffo graduated from Rutgers University in 1966 with a B.A. in history and earned a Ph.D. in American Studies from Yale University in 1976.

He taught at Yale University from 1970 to 1972 and Bucknell University from 1972 to 1973. He moved to George Washington University in 1973.

He received grants from the American Council of Learned Societies and the National Endowment for the Humanities, served as visiting professor at Fudan University in China, and held the Organization of American Historians-American Studies Association residency in Japan.

He was academic adviser to The World of F. Scott Fitzgerald (NPR), With God on Our Side (PBS-TV) and the documentary film The Life and Times of Hank Greenberg.

Ribuffo was also worked as a specialist abroad for the United States Information Agency (USIA) in Nigeria and the Republic of Korea.

He died on November 27, 2018.

== Awards ==
- 1985 Merle Curti Award

== Writings ==
=== Books ===
- Old Christian Right: The Protestant Far Right from the Great Depression to the Cold War. 1983. (reprint Temple University Press, 1988, ISBN 978-0-87722-598-0) online edition
- Right Center Left: Essays in American History. Rutgers University Press. 1992. ISBN 978-0-8135-1776-6.
- The Limits of Moderation: Jimmy Carter and the Ironies of American Liberalism. Westphalia Press. 2023. ISBN 1637238398.

=== Contributions ===
- Elliott Abrams, ed. (2001). "Comments". The influence of faith: religious groups and U.S. foreign policy. Rowman & Littlefield. ISBN 978-0-7425-0763-0.
- Stephen J. Whitfield, ed. (2004). "1974-1988". A companion to 20th-century America. Wiley-Blackwell. ISBN 978-0-631-21100-6.
- Michal R. Belknap, ed. (1994). "United States v. McWilliams: The Roosevelt Administration and the Far Right". American political trials. Greenwood Publishing Group. ISBN 978-0-275-94437-7.
- Bruce Kuklick; Darryl G. Hart, eds. (1997). "Afterword: Cultural Shouting Matching and the Academic Study of American Religious History". Religious advocacy and American history. Wm. B. Eerdmans Publishing. ISBN 978-0-8028-4260-2.

=== Essays ===
- "Leo P. Ribuffo: President Obama". Religion and Ethics Newsweekly. WGBH. November 10, 2008.
- "What Underlies Obama's Analysis of "The People""". History News Network. April 14, 2008.
- "The C-SPAN Poll: An Empirical Challenge to the Participants". History News Network. February 17, 2009.
