= Kathryn Kish Sklar =

American historian, author, and academic (born 1939)

- Born: December 26, 1939 (age 86); Columbus, Ohio, United States
- Title: Distinguished Professor Emerita at the State University of New York at Binghamton
- Spouse: Thomas Dublin

Academic background
- Education: Radcliffe College, University of Michigan

Academic work
- Discipline: Historian
- Sub-discipline: U.S. women, social movements, comparative history
- Institutions: State University of New York at Binghamton, 1988-2018; University of California, Los Angeles, 1974-1988; University of Michigan, 1969-1974

Kathryn Kish Sklar (born December 26, 1939) is an American historian, author, and professor. Her work focuses on the history of women's participation in social movements, voluntary organizations, and American public culture.

== Life and career ==
Sklar was born on December 26, 1939, in Columbus, Ohio. She received a Bachelor of Arts degree in history and literature from Radcliffe College (1965). She received a Master of Arts (1967) and Ph.D. (1969) from University of Michigan in U.S. and comparative history.

After completing her Ph.D., Sklar worked as a lecturer and assistant professor at the University of Michigan (1969–1974) before becoming an associate professor (1974–1981) and full professor (1981–1988) of history at the University of California, Los Angeles (UCLA). At UCLA, Sklar created the Teaching Workshop on U.S. Women's History. She served as Distinguished Professor of History at Binghamton University from 1988 to 2012 and became a Distinguished Professor Emerita in 2012. From 2005 to 2006 Sklar was the Harmsworth Professor of U.S. History at Oxford University.

In 1997, Sklar received a grant from the National Endowment for the Humanities to begin the "Women in Social Movements in the United States 1600-2000" project as a senior seminar at Binghamton University. The project expanded to become one of the premier online resources for the study of U.S. women's history. The site includes over one hundred document projects, and Sklar continues to release biannual editions of new document projects and full-text sources for the study of women's history with historian Thomas Dublin.

Sklar resides in Berkeley, California, with her partner Thomas Dublin.

== Fellowships, grants, and awards ==
=== Fellowships and grants ===
- 1973, Faculty Research Grant for the Study of Women in Society, Ford Foundation
- 1981, Humanities Fellowship, Rockefeller Foundation
- 1984, Guggenheim Fellowship, John Simon Guggenheim Memorial Foundation
- 1987, Fellowship, Center for Advanced Study in the Behavioral Sciences at Stanford University
- 1992, Fellowship, Wilson Center
- 1995, Fellowship, National Humanities Center
- 1998, Fellowship, National Endowment for the Humanities
- 2000, University Scholar-in-Residence Award, American Association of University Women
- 2003, Grant, National Endowment for the Humanities
- 2004, Grant, National Historical Publications and Records Commission
- 2005, Harmsworth Professorship, University of Oxford
- 2007, Japan Residency, Organization of American Historians

=== Awards ===
- 1996, Berkshire Conference of Women Historians Book Prize
- 1975, Berkshire Conference of Women Historians Book Prize

== Works ==
- Sklar, Kathryn Kish; Ellington, Barbara Reeves; Shemo, Connie, eds. (2010). Competing Kingdoms: Women, Mission, Nation, and the Protestant American Empire, 1776-1960. Duke University Press. ISBN 978-0822346500.
- —; Palmer, Beverly Wilson, eds. (2009). The Selected Letters of Florence Kelley, 1869-1931. University of Illinois Press. ISBN 9780252034046.
- —; Stewart, James Brewer, eds. (2007). Women's Rights and Transatlantic Antislavery in the Era of Emancipation. Yale University Press. ISBN 978-0300137866.
- — (2008-07-23). Women and Power in American History. Prentice Hall. ISBN 9780205645756.
- — (2000-06-17). Women's Rights Emerges Within the Anti-Slavery Movement, 1830-1870: A Brief History with Documents. Palgrave Macmillan. ISBN 9780312228194.
- —; Schüler, Anja; Strasser, Susan, eds. (1998). Social Justice Feminists in the United States and Germany: A Dialogue in Documents, 1885-1933. Cornell University Press. ISBN 0801484693.
- —, ed. (1995). Florence Kelley and the Nation's Work: The Rise of Women's Political Culture, 1830-1900. Yale University Press. ISBN 0300072856.
- Kerber, Linda K.; Kessler-Harris, Alice; Sklar, Kathryn Kish, eds. (1995). U.S. History as Women's History: New Feminist Essays. Univ of North Carolina Press. ISBN 9780807844953. "'U.S. History as Women's History: New Feminist Essays' kish sklar."
- Bulmer, Martin; Bales, Kevin; Sklar, Kathryn Kish, eds. (1991). The Social Survey in Historical Perspective, 1880-1940. Cambridge University Press. ISBN 9780521363341.
- Kelley, Florence (1986). Sklar, Kathryn Kish (ed.). The Autobiography of Florence Kelley: Notes of Sixty Years. Chicago: C.H. Kerr Pub. Co. ISBN 0882860925. OCLC 13818491.
- Stowe, Harriet Beecher (1982). Sklar, Kathryn Kish (ed.). Harriet Beecher Stowe: Three Novels. New York: Viking Press. ISBN 0940450011.
- Sklar, Kathryn Kish (1973). Catharine Beecher: A Study in American Domesticity. Yale University Press. ISBN 9780300015805.

== External sources ==
- Kathryn Kish Sklar at Jewish Women's Archive
- Women and Social Movements Library Collection
