= Reviews in American History =

- Discipline: History of the United States
- Language: English
- Edited by: Ari Kelman

Publication details
- History: 1973-present
- Publisher: Johns Hopkins University Press (United States)
- Frequency: Quarterly

Standard abbreviations
- ISO 4: Rev. Am. Hist.

Indexing
- ISSN: 0048-7511 (print); 1080-6628 (web)
- LCCN: 72013938
- OCLC no.: 1783629

Links
- Journal homepage; Online access at Project MUSE

Reviews in American History is a quarterly peer-reviewed academic journal established in 1973 and published by the Johns Hopkins University Press. It publishes reviews of new books on the topic of American history, as well as retrospectives on influential titles of the past. All areas of American history, including political, military, economic, gender, religious, social, cultural, legal, intellectual, artistic, and philosophical, are covered. The current editor-in-chief is Ari Kelman of the University of California, Davis.

== Abstracting and indexing ==
The journal is abstracted and indexed in:

- Academic ASAP
- Academic OneFile
- Academic Search Elite
- America: History and Life
- Arts and Humanities Citation Index
- Bibliography of Native North Americans
- EMBASE
- Expanded Academic ASAP
- Historical Abstracts
- Humanities Abstracts
- Humanities Index
- Humanities International Index
- International Bibliography of Book Reviews of Scholarly Literature in the Humanities and Social Sciences
- International Bibliography of Periodical Literature
- InfoTrac
- MEDLINE/PubMed
- ProQuest
- Russian Academy of Sciences Bibliographies
- Scopus
- Women's Studies International
