= Lance Banning =

American historian (1942–2006)

- Born: January 24, 1942; Kansas City, Missouri, U.S.
- Died: January 31, 2006 (aged 64)
- Education: University of Missouri; Washington University in St. Louis (PhD)
- Occupation: Historian
- Awards: Merle Curti Award (1997)

Lance Banning (January 24, 1942 – January 31, 2006) was an American historian who specialized in studying the politics of the United States' Founding Fathers. He taught mostly at the University of Kentucky.

== Life ==
Banning was a native of Kansas City, Missouri. He graduated from the University of Missouri, and from Washington University in St. Louis with a master's and PhD. His 1971 dissertation, titled "The quarrel with Federalism: a study in the origins and character of Republican thought," was directed by John Murrin. J.G.A. Pocock and William Nesbit Chambers.

He taught American history at Brown University, and University of Kentucky. He served as the Leverhulme Visiting professor at the University of Edinburgh. In 1997, he taught at the University of Groningen.

He was among the scholars who was commissioned by the newly formed Thomas Jefferson Heritage Society in 1999 to review materials about Thomas Jefferson and Sally Hemings, after the 1998 DNA study was published indicating a match between the Jefferson male line and a descendant of Eston Hemings, the youngest son. The commission thought there was not sufficient evidence to conclude that Jefferson was the father of Hemings' children, and proposed his younger brother Randolph Jefferson, who had never seriously been put forward until after the 1998 DNA study.

== Legacy and honors ==
- 1997 Merle Curti Award for his Sacred Fire of Liberty: James Madison
- 1997, Fulbright Fellowship at the University of Groningen in the Netherlands.
- National Endowment for the Humanities fellowship
- 1979 Guggenheim Fellowship
- National Humanities Center

== Works ==
External videos
- Booknotes interview with Banning on The Sacred Fire of Liberty: James Madison and the Founding of the Federal Republic, February 11, 1996, C-SPAN

- Richard R. Beeman; Stephen Botein; Edward Carlos Carter, eds. (1987). "The Practicable Sphere of a Republic". Beyond confederation: origins of the constitution and American national identity. UNC Press. p. 162. ISBN 978-0-8078-4172-3. "Lance Banning."
- Neil Longley York, ed. (1988). "1787 and 1776: Patrick Henry, James Madison, the Constitution and the Revolution". Toward a more perfect union: six essays on the constitution. SUNY Press. ISBN 978-0-88706-926-0.
- After the Constitution: party conflict in the New Republic. Wadsworth. 1989. ISBN 978-0-534-11003-1.
- David Thomas Konig, ed. (2002). "Political Economy and the Creation of the Federal Republic". Devising Liberty: Preserving and Creating Freedom in the New American Republic. Stanford University Press. ISBN 978-0-8047-4193-4.
- The Jeffersonian Persuasion: Evolution of a Party Ideology. Cornell University Press. 1980. ISBN 978-0-8014-9200-6.
- Jefferson and Madison: Three Conversations from the Founding. Rowman & Littlefield. 1995. ISBN 978-0-945612-48-3.
- The Sacred Fire of Liberty: James Madison and the Founding of the Federal Republic. Cornell University Press. 1998. ISBN 978-0-8014-8524-4.
- Conceived in Liberty: The Struggle to Define the New Republic, 1789–1793. Rowman & Littlefield. 2004. ISBN 978-0-7425-0799-9.
- Lance Banning, ed. (2004). Liberty and Order: The First American Party Struggle. Liberty Fund. ISBN 978-0-86597-418-0.

=== Criticism ===
- "A review of "Negro President": Jefferson and the Slave Power, by Garry Wills", The Claremont Institute, August 31, 2004
