= Karin Wulf =

American historian

- Born: August 26, 1964 (age 62); Charlottesville, Virginia
- Education: American University (B.A., 1985) Johns Hopkins University (M.A., 1990. Ph.D. 1993)
- Occupation: Historian
- Employer: College of William & Mary (2004-) American University

Karin A. Wulf (born August 26, 1964) is an American historian and the Beatrice and Julio Mario Santo Domingo Director and Librarian of the John Carter Brown Library in Providence, Rhode Island. She was the executive director of the Omohundro Institute of Early American History and Culture at the College of William & Mary in Williamsburg, Virginia from 2013 through 2021. She is also one of the founders of Women Also Know History, a searchable website database of women historians. Additionally, Wulf worked to spearhead a neurodiversity working group at William & Mary in 2011. She is currently writing a book about genealogy and political culture in Early America titled, Lineage: Genealogy and the Politics of Connection in British America, 1680-1820. Her work examines the history of women, gender, and the family in Early America.

Wulf joined Brown University as the Beatrice and Julio Mario Santo Domingo Director and Librarian of the John Carter Brown Library in October 2021.

== Bibliography ==
- The Diary of Hannah Callender Sansom: Sense and Sensibility in the Age of the American Revolution. Edited by Susan E. Klepp and Karin Wulf. Ithaca, N.Y.: Cornell University Press. 2010. ISBN 9780801447846.
- Not All Wives: Women of Colonial Philadelphia. Ithaca, N.Y.: Cornell University Press. 2000. ISBN 0801437024.
- Milcah Martha Moore's Book: A Commonplace Book from Revolutionary America. University Park, Pennsylvania: Pennsylvania State University Press. 1997. ISBN 9780271030050.
