= Walter Licht =

American historian

- Born: July 15, 1946 (age 80); Brooklyn, New York, U.S.
- Education: Harvard University (BA); University of Chicago (MA); Princeton University (MA, PhD)
- Scientific career
- Fields: Labor history, economic history
- Workplaces: University of Pennsylvania

Walter Licht (born July 15, 1946) is an American historian who specializes in labor history, economic history, and the history of American capitalism. He is Walter H. Annenberg Professor of History Emeritus at the University of Pennsylvania.

== Life and career ==
Born in Brooklyn, Licht earned his B.A. at Harvard University and an M.A. in sociology at the University of Chicago before moving to Princeton University where he completed an M.A. and Ph.D. in history.

He has taught at the University of Pennsylvania since 1977, retiring to emeritus status in 2022, and was the faculty director of its Civic House since 2002 and of its Civic Scholars Program since 2006, stepping down from both in 2020.

== Works ==
- Working For The Railroad: The Organization of Work in the Nineteenth Century (Princeton University Press, 1983/2014) ISBN 978-0691609973.
- Work Sights: Industrial Philadelphia, 1890-1950 (Temple University Press, 1986) ISBN 978-0877223412.
- Industrializing America: The Nineteenth Century (Johns Hopkins University Press, 1995) ISBN 978-0801850141.
- Getting Work: Philadelphia, 1840–1950 (University of Pennsylvania Press, 1992/2000) ISBN 978-0812217193.
- The Face of Decline: The Pennsylvania Anthracite Region in the Twentieth Century (Cornell University Press, 2005) ISBN 978-0801484735.
