= Melvyn Dubofsky =

American labor historian (born 1934)

- Born: October 25, 1934 (age 92); New York City, U.S.
- Education: Brooklyn College; University of Rochester (PhD)
- Occupation: Labor historian
- Spouse: Joan Klores (m. 1959)
- Children: 2

Melvyn Dubofsky (born October 25, 1934) is professor emeritus of history and sociology, and a well-known labor historian. He is Bartle Distinguished Professor of History and Sociology at the Binghamton University.

Dubofsky helped advance the field of "new labor history," which focuses on the experiences of workers and social movements rather than institutions.

[Dubofsky] is one of the five major labour historians who pioneered new approaches to working-class experience in the 1950s and 1960s. Along with Herbert G. Gutman, David Montgomery, David Brody, and Alice Kessler-Harris, Dubofsky researched, wrote about, and taught courses in labour history at a time when the field was not in fashion and there was little appreciation and support for the study of workers and their pasts.

Since the early 1980s, Dubofsky has written extensively about the role of politics and state action in the changing fortunes of the American labor movement. Dubofsky promotes the theory that labor radicalism emerged from what has been termed a "culture of poverty," and he stresses the role culture and the development of capitalism play in the American labor movement-particularly in the late 19th century. Dubofsky's research has influenced other scholars, such as Joseph McCartin. Dubofsky has also worked closely with the Fernand Braudel Center at Binghamton. His research at the center has looked at how changing technology, such as automation, has driven worker activism.

== Early life and education ==
Dubofsky was born in 1934 to Harry and Lillian (née Schneider) Dubofsky in New York City. He graduated from the New York City public schools, and received his bachelor's degree from Brooklyn College (now part of the City University of New York) in 1955.

Dubofsky was a lecturer in history at Brooklyn College during the 1958 to 1959 school year. He married Joan Klores in January 1959, and they had two children, David and Lisa.

He received a Doctor of Philosophy degree from the University of Rochester in 1960.

== Career ==
Dubofsky was appointed an assistant professor of history at Northern Illinois University in 1959.

In 1967, Dubofsky took a position as an associate professor of history at the University of Massachusetts Amherst. He left that position in 1969.

In the 1969 to 1970 term, Dubofsky was a senior lecturer at the Centre for the Study of Social History at the University of Warwick. He taught American labor history. The same year, he was an associate professor of history at the University of Wisconsin–Milwaukee. He was promoted to professor of history in late 1970.

In 1971, Dubofsky was appointed professor of history at the State University of New York at Binghamton. In 1979, he was also appointed professor of sociology. In 1991, he was named Bartle Distinguished Professor of History & Sociology.

== Published works ==
=== Solely authored books ===
- When Workers Organize: New York City in the Progressive Era. Amherst, Mass.: University of Massachusetts Press, 1968. ISBN 0-87023-042-5
- We Shall Be All: A History of the Industrial Workers of the World. Abridged ed. Champaign, Ill.: University of Illinois Press, 2000. ISBN 0-252-06905-6, this was originally published by Quadrangle Books in 1969.
- American Labor Since the New Deal. Chicago: Quadrangle Books, 1971. ISBN 0-8129-6167-6
- Technological Change and Workers' Movements. Thousand Oaks, Calif.: Sage Publications, 1985. ISBN 0-8039-2465-8
- Big Bill Haywood. Manchester, U.K.: University of Manchester Press, 1987. ISBN 0-7190-2163-4
- "On Treacherous Terrain: Labor, Politics, and the State in the United States." Working Paper No. 3, Comparative Labor History Series, Center for Labor Studies, University of Washington. November 1993.
- The State and Labor in Modern America. Asheville, N.C.: University of North Carolina Press, 1994. ISBN 0-8078-4436-5
- Industrialism and the American Worker, 1865–1920. 3rd ed. Wheeling, Ill.: Harlan Davidson, 1996. ISBN 0-88295-925-5
- Hard Work: The Making of Labor History. Champaign, Ill.: University of Illinois Press, Spring 2000. ISBN 0-252-06868-8
- Labor in the Great Depression and the New Deal. Milton Park, Abingdon, Oxford, U.K.: Routledge, 2005. ISBN 0-415-94061-3

=== Co-authored books ===
- Dubofsky, Melvyn; Smith, Daniel; and Theoharis, Athan. The United States in the Twentieth Century. Saddle River, N.J.: Prentice-Hall, 1978. ISBN 0-13-938712-9
- Dubofsky, Melvyn and Theoharis, Athan. Imperial Democracy: The United States Since 1945. Saddle River, N.J.: Prentice-Hall, Inc., 1983. ISBN 0-13-451766-0
- Dubofsky, Melvyn and Burwood, Stephen. The Great Depression and the New Deal. New York: Garland Publishing, 1990.
  - Vol. 1: The New Deal. ISBN 0-8240-0893-6
  - Vol. 2: Workers and Unions During the Great Depression. ISBN 0-8240-0894-4
  - Vol. 3: The American Economy During the Great Depression. ISBN 0-8240-0895-2
  - Vol. 4: Agriculture During the Great Depression. ISBN 0-8240-0896-0
  - Vol. 5: American Foreign Policy in the 1930s. ISBN 0-8240-0897-9
  - Vol. 6: Women and Minorities During the Great Depression. ISBN 0-8240-0898-7
  - Vol. 7: The Law and the New Deal. ISBN 0-8240-0899-5
- Dubofsky, Melvyn and Van Tine, Warren. Labor Leaders in America. Champaign, Ill.: University of Illinois Press, 1990. ISBN 0-252-01327-1
- Dubofsky, Melvyn and Van Tine, Warren. John L. Lewis: A Biography. Reprint ed. Champaign, Ill.: University of Illinois Press, 1992. ISBN 0-8129-0673-X
- Dubofsky, Melvyn and Dulles, Foster Rhea. Labor in America. 7th ed. Wheeling, Ill.: Harlan Davidson, 1993. ISBN 0-88295-998-0

=== Solely edited books ===
- The New Deal: Conflicting Interpretations and Shifting Perspectives. New York: Garland Publishing, 1992. ISBN 0-8153-0765-9

=== Co-edited books ===
- Dubofsky, Melvyn and McCartin, Joseph A. American Labor: A Documentary History. Houndmills, Basingstoke, Hampshire, England: Palgrave Macmillan, 2004. ISBN 0-312-29564-2

=== Solely authored book chapters ===
- "Jimmy Carter and the Collapse of the Politics of Productivity." In The Carter Presidency: Policy Choices in the Post-New Deal Era. Gary Fink and Hugh Davis Graham, eds. Lawrence, Kan.: University Press of Kansas, 1998. ISBN 0-7006-0895-8
- "The Federal Judiciary, Free Labor, and Equal Rights: A Peculiar Chapter in the History of State and Labor." In The Pullman Strike and the Crisis of the 1890s: Essays on Labor, Politics, and the State. Richard Schneirov, Nick Salvatore, and Shelton Stromquist, eds. Wheeling, Ill.: University of Illinois Press, 1998. ISBN 0-252-06755-X

=== Solely authored articles ===
- "Old Deal, New Deal, Raw Deal: The Evolution of the Liberal State in the Modern United States." Labour/Le Travail. 32 (Fall 1993).
- "Starting Out in the Fifties: True Confessions of a Labor Historian." Labor History. 34 (Fall 1993).
- "Labor Unrest in the United States, 1906–1990." Review (Journal of the Fernand Braudel Center). 18 (Winter 1995).

=== Co-authored articles ===
- Silver, Beverly J.; Arrighi, Giovanni; and Dubofsky, Melvyn. "Introduction: Labor Unrest in the World Economy, 1870–1990." Review (Journal of the Fernand Braudel Center). 18 (Winter 1995).

== Memberships and awards ==
Dubofsky has been awarded numerous research grants, fellowships, and awards during his long career.

The National Endowment for the Humanities awarded him a senior fellowship in 1973, twice named him director of the NEH Summer Seminars for Professionals ( in 1980 and 1981), and awarded him a research fellowship in 1985.

Three times he has been a Fulbright Program educator. He was a senior lecturer at Tel Aviv University in 1977, a distinguished senior lecturer at the University of Salzburg in 1988, and was a Distinguished Professor holding the John Adams Professorship in U.S. History at the University of Amsterdam in 2000.

Dubofsky has been a member of the executive board of the Fernand Braudel Center since 1976, and an associate director of the center since 1996.

He is an editor for the Research Collections on Labor Studies for University Publications of America, an American publisher. And he is an editor for the Oxford Companion to American History series, published by Oxford University Press.

Dubofsky also is on the Board of Advisors for the Samuel Gompers Papers, and is a member of the Philip Taft Labor History Book Award prize committee.

His is a member of the editorial board of Labor History and Review (Journal of the Fernand Braudel Center).

Dubofsky is a member of the American Historical Association, the Organization of American Historians, and the New York State Labor History Association (where he was vice president from 1978 to 1979, and president from 1979 to 1980).
