= New labor history =

Branch of labor history

New labor history is a branch of labor history which focuses on the experiences of workers, women, and minorities in the study of history. It is heavily influenced by social history.

Before the 1960s, most labor historians around the world focused on the history of labor unions. In the United States, for example, labor economists at the University of Wisconsin dominated the academic discipline of labor history. Their research focused on the development of markets, trade unions, and political philosophies.

In the 1950s, British and other European historians developed the field of social history to correct the structuralist imbalances they perceived in the study of history. Social historians not only sought to enlarge the study of history but to refocus it on the experiences of common people rather than institutions or elites.

British social historians such as E. P. Thompson, in particular, had a significant impact on American labor historians. Labor scholars to the right and left of the American political spectrum found it difficult to explain the rise of labor in the late 19th century, and social history offered at least a new approach to solving the riddle. Social history also took root at the same time that American organized labor began to decline. For left-leaning labor scholars, social history suggested a new way to revitalize the American labor movement by focusing attention away from conservative leaders and institutions, as well as a means for academics to engage with workers themselves. For some, the new labor history moved the discipline of labor history away from the Marxist theoretical perspective that saw trade union movements in terms of elites, classes, and institutions.

European and American critics of the "new labor history" charge that historians now neglect institutions and elites. They argue that labor leaders and unions shape workers' goals and values as much as reflect them. They also point out that the "new labor history" has a tendency to ignore larger cultural trends and movements and technological developments which operate on a more systemic level than the individual.

Especially in the United States, many young labor historians are attempting a new synthesis of the "old" and "new" labor histories.

== Examples of "new labor history" scholars ==
- David Brody
- Melvyn Dubofsky
- Herbert Gutman
- Nelson Lichtenstein
- David Montgomery
- E. P. Thompson

== Examples of "old" labor history scholars ==
- Neil W. Chamberlain
- John R. Commons
- John Thomas Dunlop
- Selig Perlman
- Joseph Rayback
- Sumner Slichter
- Philip Taft
