= The Wobblies: The Story of Syndicalism in the United States =

1967 book

- Author: Patrick Renshaw
- Subject: Labor history
- Publisher: Doubleday
- Publication date: 1967
- Pages: 258

The Wobblies: The Story of Syndicalism in the United States is a 1967 history book by Patrick Renshaw on the American history of the Industrial Workers of the World.

== Bibliography ==
- Clark, Malcolm (1968). "Review of The Wobblies: The Story of Syndicalism in the United States; The Ku Klux Klan in the City, 1915-1930". Oregon Historical Quarterly. 69 (2): 179–180. ISSN 0030-4727. JSTOR 20613049.
- Czarnecki, Edgar R. (1968). "Review of The Wobblies: The Story of Syndicalism in the United States". Industrial and Labor Relations Review. 22 (1): 134–135. doi:10.2307/2520698. ISSN 0019-7939. JSTOR 2520698.
- Korman, Gerd (1968). "Review of The Wobblies: The Story of Syndicalism in the United States". The Journal of American History. 54 (4): 908–909. doi:10.2307/1918117. ISSN 0021-8723. JSTOR 1918117.
- Leggett, John C. (1969). "Review of The Wobblies: The Story of Syndicalism in the United States". American Sociological Review. 34 (3): 414–415. doi:10.2307/2092520. ISSN 0003-1224. JSTOR 2092520.
- Rayback, Joseph G. (1968). "Review of The Wobblies: The Story of Syndicalism in the United States". The Journal of Southern History. 34 (3): 473–474. doi:10.2307/2205170. ISSN 0022-4642. JSTOR 2205170.
