= Herbert Gutman =

American professor of history

- Born: 1928; New York City, New York, United States
- Died: July 21, 1985 (aged 56–57); New York City, New York, United States
- Spouse: Judith Mara
- Children: Nell and Marta

Academic background
- Education: Queens College (BA); Columbia University (MA); University of Wisconsin–Madison (PhD)
- Thesis: Social and Economic Structure and Depression (1959)
- Doctoral advisor: Howard Beale
- Other advisor: Richard Hofstadter
- Influences: E. P. Thompson

Academic work
- Discipline: History
- Sub-discipline: American history; labor history; social history
- School or tradition: New labor history
- Institutions: Fairleigh Dickinson University; University at Buffalo; University of Rochester; City College of New York; Graduate Center, CUNY
- Notable works: The Black Family in Slavery and Freedom, 1750–1925 (1977)

Herbert George Gutman (1928 – 21 July 1985) was an American professor of history at the Graduate Center of the City University of New York, where he wrote on slavery and labor history.

== Early life and education ==
Gutman was born in 1928 to Jewish immigrant parents in New York City; he was deeply influenced by their leftism. He attended John Adams High School and graduated with a bachelor's degree from Queens College in 1948. During his teens and his college years, Gutman became involved in numerous left-wing and labor causes and worked for the Henry Wallace's 1948 presidential campaign.

He received a master's degree in history from Columbia University. His thesis studied the Panic of 1873 and its effects on New York City, and focused heavily on workers' demands for public works. It was written under the supervision of Richard Hofstadter. Gutman later dismissed it as "boring conventional labor history."

Gutman was awarded a doctorate in history from the University of Wisconsin–Madison in 1959. His doctoral dissertation was on American labor during the Panic of 1873 and supervised by Howard Beale. During this time, Gutman worked with the eminent labor scholars Merrill Jensen, Merle Curti, and Selig Perlman, who had turned the University of Wisconsin–Madison into the cradle of modern American labor studies.

He later married Judith Mara and they had two daughters.

== Career ==
Gutman taught at Fairleigh Dickinson University from 1956 to 1963. Immersing himself in the "new labor history", he researched and wrote a series of community studies about railroad workers, coal miners and ironworkers. During his earliest years as a labor historian, Gutman's thesis was that "workers derived their strength from their small-town milieus and from alliances with class elements unsympathetic to the rising industrialists ..." But, as he later admitted, this conclusion was wrong.

Gutman then took a position teaching history at the State University of New York at Buffalo beginning in 1963. At SUNY-Buffalo, he began adapting more statistical and quantitative methodologies to the study of American history. But in 1964, the preeminent British social historian E. P. Thompson came to the United States expressly to visit Gutman. "Gutman's insights into the strengths of working-class resistance to industrial capitalism and the realization that one source of this resistance lay in traditions and ideas derived from previous forms of social organization made Thompson's emphasis on culture and the 'making' of the working class particularly attractive." When Gutman's essay "Protestantism and the American Labor Movement" appeared in the American Historical Review in 1966, it not only put him in the forefront of the new labor history movement, but also cemented his already-considerable reputation.

Gutman left SUNY-Buffalo in 1966 to take a job at the University of Rochester. During this time, he conducted most of the research for his massive, path-breaking work, The Black Family in Slavery and Freedom, 1750–1925.

Gutman left the Rochester in 1972, and became a professor of history at the City College of New York. He joined CUNY's Graduate Center in 1975, and stopped teaching at City College in 1975 to teach full-time in the graduate program.

In 1977, Gutman received a grant from the National Endowment for the Humanities (NEH) to teach labor history to union members. The series of lectures, called "Americans at Work", continued until 1980. The lectures attracted widespread attention from unions, workers and Gutman's peers for their engaging style, detail and application to current events in the labor movement.

The enthusiasm generated by the NEH lectures led Gutman to co-found the American Social History Project at CUNY Graduate Center. The project, funded by NEH and the Ford Foundation, began collecting original documents, oral histories, biographies and other historical documentation relating to the history of labor and workers in the US. It produced a film, a series of slide shows, and a two-volume history of working people in the United States entitled Who Built America?

In 1984, Gutman received a Guggenheim Fellowship and was teaching classes at four historically black colleges for the United Negro College Fund.

Gutman suffered a severe heart attack in late June 1985 at his home in Nyack, New York. He died five weeks later at New York Hospital-Cornell Medical Center on July 21, 1985.

== Research focus and critical assessment ==
Herbert Gutman focused on the history of workers and slaves in the United States. He is considered one of the co-founders and primary proponents of the "new labor history," a school of thought that believes ordinary people have not received the proper amount of attention from historians. He developed a critique of the "Commons school" of labor history that focused on markets and minimized other factors such as technological or cultural changes and working people themselves.

Gutman has been criticized for his quasi-Marxist theoretical leanings. But by the late 1950s, he had moved away from Marxism. Instead, he retained "what he called 'a really good set of questions' that Marx had inspired (e.g., what were workers, not just leaders, doing on a day-to-day basis?). These questions reshaped labor history and also appealed to students of Afro-American history."

Gutman was often criticized for overemphasizing the experiences of working people and blacks as historical agents, and "sometimes summarily dismissed as a 'romantic' and lacking in sophisticated 'theory'…".

Gutman is best known for two major studies of slavery in America: Slavery and the Numbers Game: A Critique of "Time on the Cross" (1975) and The Black Family in Slavery and Freedom, 1750–1925 (1976), and for Work, Culture and Society in Industrializing America (1976).

=== Slavery and the Numbers Game ===
"Slavery and the Numbers Game" deconstructs the assumptions and methodology in the book Time on the Cross: The Economics of American Negro Slavery, by Robert William Fogel and Stanley L. Engerman. Time on the Cross denied that slavery was unprofitable, a moribund institution (even though, in fact, few academics said or believed that by this time), inefficient, and extremely harsh for typical slave. The book received a large amount of mainstream media attention for its revisionism, impressed the historical community with its use of cliometrics, and outraged many in the civil rights community (with some calling it a rallying cry for racism).

Gutman systematically took Fogel and Engerman to task on a variety of fronts. He noted the authors were extremely careless in their calculations, and often used the wrong measurement to estimate the harshness of slavery. For example, Fogel and Engerman assumed that slave couples moved west together with their owners, based on their analysis of probate records and invoices from slave sales in New Orleans, and therefore argued that the slave trade related did not destroy black families. Gutman challenged this argument, as Fogel and Engerman seemed to ignore the fact that slave's spouses were not always sold to the same master. Furthermore, the authors of Time on the Cross did not take into account the friends and extended family of slaves left behind, again ignoring the disruptive impact this had on slave families and communities. In Slavery and the Numbers Game, Gutman argued that Fogel and Engerman chose their examples poorly, focussing on plantations which were unreflective of broader southern society. Gutman roundly criticized Fogel and Engerman on a host of other claims as well, including the lack of evidence for systematic and regular rewards and a failure to consider the effect public whipping would have on other slaves. Gutman also argued that Fogel and Engerman had fallen prey to an ideological pitfall by assuming that most of those enslaved had assimilated the Protestant work ethic. If they had such an ethic, then the system of punishments and rewards outlined in Time on the Cross would support Fogel and Engerman's thesis. Gutman conclusively showed, however, that most slaves had not adopted this ethic at all and that slavery's carrot-and-stick approach to work had not shaped the slave worldview to mimic that of their owners. Gutman emphasizes the slaves' responses to their treatment at the hands of slaveowners. He shows that slaves labored, not because they shared values and goals with their masters, but because of the omnipresent threat of 'negative incentives,' primarily physical violence.

=== The Black Family in Slavery and Freedom, 1750–1925 ===
The Black Family in Slavery and Freedom, 1750–1925, published a year after Slavery and the Numbers Game, is a detailed study of black family life under slavery in the United States. The book draws on census data, diaries, family records, bills of sale and other records, and argues that slavery did not break up the black family. Gutman concluded that most black families largely remained intact despite slavery. Gutman further argued that black families also remained intact during the first wave of migration to the North after the Civil War (although he remained open to arguments about black family collapse in the 1930s and 1940s).

Gutman's work was widely praised. It not only constituted an excellent example of social history for its focus on individuals but it challenged long-held conventional ideas about the slavery's effects on black families.

=== Work, Culture and Society in Industrializing America ===
Here, Gutman wrote in opposition to previous approaches to U.S. working-class history that had focused on trade unionism, instead examining "the institutions, beliefs, and ideas that American workers ... created and recreated in their adaptation to the harsh realities of the new industrial system."

== Memberships and awards ==
Gutman was a member of the American Academy of Arts and Sciences. Along with David Brody and David Montgomery), he was editor of the Working Class in American History series at the University of Illinois Press. In the late 1980s, the University of Illinois Press established the Herbert Gutman Award for the best book in American history published by the press.

== Published works ==
=== Solely authored books ===
- The Black Family in Slavery and Freedom, 1750-1925. New York: Vintage Books, 1977. ISBN 0-394-72451-8 Full text online free
- Work, Culture and Society. New York: Vintage Books, 1977. ISBN 0-394-72251-5 Full text online free
- Power & Culture: Essays. New York: Pantheon Books, 1987. Edited and with an Introduction by Ira Berlin. ISBN 0-394-56026-4 full text online free
- Slavery and the Numbers Game: A Critique of 'Time on the Cross'. Introduction by Bruce Levine. Champaign, Ill.: University of Illinois Press, 2003. ISBN 0-252-07151-4 Full text online free

=== Solely authored book chapters ===
- "The Negro and the United Mine Workers of America: The Career and Letters of Richard L. Davis and Something of Their Meaning, 1890-1900." In The Negro and the American Labor Movement. Julius Jacobson, ed. New York: Doubleday, 1968. ISBN 0-385-01113-X
- "Work, Culture, and Society in Industrializing America." In Work, Culture, and Society in Industrializing America. Herbert G. Gutman, ed. New York: Knopf, 1976. ISBN 0-394-49694-9
- "Labor in the Land of Lincoln: Coal Miners on the Prairie." In Power and Culture: Essays on the American Working Class. Reissue edition. Ira Berlin, ed. New York: New Press, 1992. ISBN 1-56584-010-0
- "The Workers' Search for Power: Labor in the Gilded Age." In Power and Culture: Essays on the American Working Class. Reissue edition. Herbert G. Gutman, ed. New York: Pantheon, 1992. ISBN 1-56584-010-0

=== Solely authored articles ===
- "Reconstruction in Ohio: Negroes in the Hocking Valley Coal Mines in 1873 and 1874." Labor History. 3:3 (Fall 1962).
- "Protestantism and the American Labor Movement: The Christian Spirit in the Gilded Age." American Historical Review. 72 (1966).

=== Co-edited books ===
- Gutman, Herbert G. and Kealey, Gregory S., eds. Many Pasts: Readings in American Social History, 1600–1876. Vol. 1. Englewood Cliffs, N.J.: Prentice Hall, 1973. ISBN 0-13-555904-9
- Gutman, Herbert G. and Kealey, Gregory S., eds. Many Pasts: Readings in American Social History, 1865–Present. Vol. 2. Englewood Cliffs, N.J.: Prentice Hall, 1973. ISBN 0-13-555938-3
- Gutman, Herbert G. and Bell, Donald H., eds. The New England Working Class and the New Labor History. Urbana: University of Illinois Press, 1987. ISBN 0-252-01300-X
