= Black Workers' Struggle for Equality in Birmingham =

2001 non-fiction book by David Montgomery

- Author: David Montgomery
- Publisher: University of Illinois Press
- Publication date: April 1, 2007
- ISBN: 978-0-252-07493-6
- OCLC: 54913711

Black Workers' Struggle for Equality in Birmingham is a 2001 book written by David Montgomery, Professor of History Emeritus at Yale University, in collaboration with Horace Huntley of the Birmingham Civil Rights Institute. The book makes use of oral histories to explain the interactions between African-American workers and labor unions in the post-Civil War American South.
