= Wisconsin school =

School of economic thought

The Wisconsin school in economics was based at the University of Wisconsin–Madison and played a role in American economics in the first half of the 20th century. The Wisconsin school was central to institutionalism in the United States and also played a prominent role in labor economics and in the development of the policy ideas associated with the New Deal. The central figures in the Wisconsin school were Richard T. Ely and his student John R. Commons.

Notable students of Commons included Edwin E. Witte, largely responsible for the drafting of the Social Security Act, Selig Perlman, Kenneth Parsons, and Harold Groves.

Other notable economists associated with the Wisconsin school include Walter Heller, Robert J. Lampman, Warren Samuels, and Theodore Schultz.

== See also ==
- Wisconsin Idea
