= Horace Huntley =

American historian

Horace Huntley is a retired professor from the University of Alabama, Birmingham (UAB) in the School of Social and Behavioral Sciences. Dr. Huntley has worked extensively as a historian in the fields of Civil Rights, Labor History, Black History and African American Studies. He was the inaugural Director of the Oral History Project of the Birmingham Civil Rights Institute.

== Research and publications ==
Huntley worked at the Birmingham Civil Rights Institute researching and interpreting oral histories for a book, Black Workers' Struggle for Equality in Birmingham, which he authored with Yale University historian David Montgomery. The book, which was published in 2004 cataloged the relationships between African American workers and labor unions in the post-Civil Rights American South. He also authored A Master Option Trader's Journey From Pipe Shop To Wall Street – The Life and Times of Terry Harris in 2005, which tells the story of a young black man, born in Bessemer, Alabama who teaches himself the art of option trading on Wall Street and then develops a system to teach other poor people the same.

In 2006, he co-authored Nerve Juice And The Ivory Tower – Confrontation in Minnesota – The True Story Of The Morrill Hall Takeover which tells the story of a black student's quest at the University of Minnesota for a Black Studies Department. The co-authors are Marie Braddock Williams and Rose Freeman Massey who were part of a small group of black students occupied the University of Minnesota's administration building demanding African American Studies, open admissions and increased financial and academic resources for black and non-white students. Huntley also co-authored Footsoldiers for Democracy.

In 2024, Huntley published A Glimpse At My Life And Works Through Poetry And Prose: A Celebration Of Sixty Years With The Love Of My Life, Barbara Young Huntley. This volume includes poetry about family, friends, and historical figures/events, in addition to abbreviated articles on Black life and history. Huntley shares short essays/stories on growing up in Birmingham, his search for equity and justice, migration, the meaning of family, friendship, and leadership. Photographs are used to represent phases of life in the quest to understand the sociology, psychology and economics of communities in transition. The development of the Alabama Christian Movement For Human Rights is highlighted, and the rigors of managing college rebellion and the creation of African and African American Studies at the University of Minnesota adds to the understanding of the journey in search of life's rewards..

== Personal life and education ==
Huntley is a native of Birmingham, Alabama and graduate of Wenonah High School. He was one of the first recipients of the Baccalaureate Degree in African American Studies from the University of Minnesota. He earned a master's degree from Syracuse University and a doctorate from the University of Pittsburgh. Huntley developed the minor in African American Studies at UAB and for more than twenty-five years has offered a series of courses on the experiences of Africans of the diaspora.

Huntley has also served as an Alabama Humanities Foundation Scholar, on the Birmingham Civil Rights Institute Task Force, as a founding member of the institute (BCRI). He is the Director of the Oral History Project for BCRI. He served on the Birmingham Historical Commission, the Birmingham Historical Society and as an evaluator of the Fellowship Office of the National Research Council of the National Science Foundation.

== Lawsuit ==
According to an article in The Birmingham News dated December 4, 2008, Professor Huntley sued the University of Alabama at Birmingham, claiming the school has discriminated against him and denied him fair pay because of his race and age. He also claims, in the lawsuit filed in federal court Tuesday, that UAB "has a policy of discriminating against black persons with respect to recruitment, hiring, compensation, promotions, discipline, training, discharge, pay, fringe benefits and other terms and conditions of employment."
