= The Black Family in Slavery and Freedom =

Book by Herbert G. Gutman

- Cover of the first edition
- Author: Herbert G. Gutman
- Language: English
- Subject: Sociology
- Genre: History
- Published: Vintage; 1st Edition (July 12, 1977)
- Publication place: United States
- Media type: Print (hardcover)
- ISBN: 0394724518

The Black Family in Slavery and Freedom, 1750-1925 is a book by Herbert G. Gutman that addresses the impact of slavery on black families. It is based on research that Gutman conducted over the course of the decade since the Moynihan Report, which revived the "tangle of pathology" thesis; the claim that black families in the US were incapable of functioning in a healthy way, a rationale previously rejected by critics as racist. The book draws on census data, diaries, family records, bills of sale and other records.

Gutman says that if slavery destroyed the family as white politician Daniel Patrick Moynihan claimed, then family structure statistics should have been worse closer to the time of slavery. He then lays out statistics showing that black families actually had higher legitimacy rates than whites for the first several decades after the end of the Civil War, along with comparable success in various other metrics.

Gutman concludes that black families, rather than having been irretrievably destroyed by slavery, showed great power and resilience, pulling together as slavery ended, with more two-parent households and couples who stayed together longer. He says that black families also remained intact during the first wave of migration to the North after the Civil War (although he remained open to arguments about black family collapse in the 1930s and 1940s). All the way through 1925, black families grew stronger and more successful, increasing in wealth.
