= Beyond Equality =

Beyond Equality: Labor and the Radical Republicans, 1862-1872 is a non-fiction book written by historian David Montgomery concerning organized labor during and after the United States Civil War until the Panic of 1873 and the relationships between labor unions and Radical Republicans. The book was Montgomery's first, written in 1967.
