= The Fall of the House of Labor =

1988 history book by David Montgomery

The Fall of the House of Labor: The Workplace, the State, and American Labor Activism, 1865–1925
- Author: David Montgomery
- Language: English
- Genre: Non-fiction
- Publication date: 1987
- Publication place: United States
- ISBN: 0-521-22579-5

The Fall of the House of Labor: The Workplace, the State, and American Labor Activism, 1865–1925 is a book published in 1988 by Yale University historian David Montgomery. The book covers the changing tide of organized labor from the end of the Civil War in 1865 until the First Red Scare and what Montgomery believes to be the effectual end of the substantially organized labor unions in 1925. The book has been heralded by many academics and historians, such as Noam Chomsky, who called the book one of the essential and definitive works cataloging the decline of the labor movement. The book was a Pulitzer Prize finalist nominee in 1988.

- Montgomery, David. The Fall of the House of Labor: The Workplace, the State, and American Labor Activism, 1865-1925. New York: Press Syndicate of the University of Cambridge, 1987. ISBN 0-521-22579-5
