= Selig Perlman =

American historian

- Selig Perlman
- Born: December 9, 1888; Białystok, Congress Poland, Russian Empire
- Died: August 14, 1959 (aged 70)

Academic work
- Discipline: Labor economics, labor history
- Notable students: Philip La Follette, Philip Taft

Selig Perlman (December 9, 1888 – August 14, 1959) was an American economist and labor historian at the University of Wisconsin–Madison.

== Background ==
Perlman was born in Białystok in Congress Poland (then part of the Russian Empire) in 1888. His father, Mordecai, was a Jewish merchant who supplied yarn and thread to home weavers and was a friend of Maxim Litvinov's father.

Perlman had a stutter and was extremely shy, which didn't stop him from excelling in the "Cheder" (the local Jewish religious school), and won a scholarship to attend a state-owned high school (or "gymnasium"). While in high school, he learned Russian and a number of other European languages, and his teachers introduced him to the work of Georgi Plekhanov. Thereafter, Perlman became an ardent Marxist.

He never joined a political party or radical movement, however, and his advocacy remained more theoretical than practical. Perlman graduated in 1905.

As a Jew, Perlman was largely barred from obtaining a higher education in Russia. So he left for Turin, Italy, to study at the University of Turin. He came down with bronchitis and transferred to the University of Naples Federico II, because Naples had a warmer climate. He studied medicine, learned Italian, joined the General Jewish Labor Union, and spent weekends with other students talking politics, languages, and literature at Maxim Gorky's home (although Gorky was rarely present for these meetings).

Perlman's paternal grandmother, Anna Blankenstein, had emigrated to the United States some years earlier and was employed as a dressmaker by the designer Hattie Carnegie. The American socialists William English Walling and Anna Strunsky were preparing to travel to Italy. Strunsky, buying dresses for the trip from Carnegie, met Blankenstein—who told her to look up Blankenstein's "brilliant nephew" in Naples who "knew everything about Russian Marxism".

Walling and Strunsky sought out Perlman in Naples in 1906, who gave them his copy of Das Kapital and The Eighteenth Brumaire of Louis Napoleon (neither of which Walling had read). Walling offered Perlman a job, but he turned it down.

Perlman ran out of money at the end of the school year. Unfortunately, the introduction of weaving plants had caused his father's business to collapse. Walling, meanwhile, had been arrested in Russia for inciting sedition and (after the intervention of President Theodore Roosevelt) had returned to the U.S. Perlman wrote to Walling asking for a job, and Walling agreed to provide one.

Perlman arrived in New York City in early 1908, where he translated various works for Walling. Suffering from depression (which he struggled with periodically throughout his life), Perlman traveled to New Hampshire to visit relatives, the Shaber family. (He met Eva Shaber at this time, and would later marry her). After his return, he expressed dissatisfaction with his work for Walling. Walling suggested Perlman leave to go study economics at the University of Wisconsin–Madison.

Perlman arrived in Madison, Wisconsin in the middle of 1908, and enrolled as junior at the university there. His roommate was David J. Saposs, later to become a noted historian, and a close friend was Edwin E. Witte. He enrolled in classes taught by Frederick Jackson Turner (who, for most of Perlman's undergraduate career, was his mentor as well), John R. Commons and Richard T. Ely. Perlman worked at various jobs for a while, including a stint as a factory inspector.

Perlman graduated with a bachelor's degree in economics in 1910. His undergraduate thesis was on the history of socialism in Milwaukee.

Perlman then entered the University of Wisconsin–Madison's doctoral program in economics. He became close friends with Edward Morehouse, later a noted economist. About this time, Turner offered to make him a research assistant. Commons also offered him a research assistant slot, working on a history of the American labor movement. Perlman took the position offered by Commons for career reasons (Commons would have been offended had he refused) and because he had already been working in the labor history field. It was Perlman's belief that, by studying the American labor movement, he could generate support for Marx's theories about labor unions.

Although Perlman is often considered a close friend and associate of Commons, the two were not very close. Commons was antisemitic and reacted negatively to Perlman's strong Yiddish accent and constant poverty. It was Commons' wife, Ella, who championed Perlman to her husband and others. (She even helped Perlman with his English grammar).

It was while working for Commons that Perlman abandoned his Marxist approach to economics. In its place, he developed a theory of self-interest. It was Perlman's belief that workers became alienated from employers because competition forced wages down. Unions formed to protect wages, Perlman argued, did not arise (as Marx believed) from the bourgeoisie.

From 1911 to 1915, Commons and Turner worked for the federal Commission on Industrial Relations. Commons brought Perlman along, getting him a job investigating strikes and conducting research for the commission. After nearly being lynched by striking workers in Lawrence, Massachusetts in 1912, Perlman retreated to the Shaber home in New Hampshire. He began courting Eva Shaber, his second cousin.

In 1912, Perlman married Eva Shaber (d. 1929). Their first son, David, was born in 1920. Their second son, Mark, an economist, was born in 1923. The Perlmans were a deeply religious family, and very active in the local Jewish community in Madison.

While Perlman continued studying for his doctorate, the financial condition of his family in Poland worsened. His father, Mordecai, his mother, Pauline, and his younger brother Jacob, were persecuted by the Russian police, and heavily fined by Russian authorities for having an expatriate in the family. Perlman sought and won a substantial salary increase from Commons, and brought his parents and sibling to the United States. The Perlmans initially settled with family in Woonsocket, Rhode Island. But, unhappy there, they moved to Madison. To save money, Perlman moved in with his parents.

In 1915, Perlman received his doctorate in economics from the University of Wisconsin–Madison.

== Career ==
In 1916, Ely hired Perlman as an assistant to review and rewrite Ely's The Labor Movement in America. Ely had theorized that labor unions arose from the values and tradition of Christian socialism. In revising Ely's work, Perlman removed all references to this theory. The revised manuscript was delivered in 1918. Ely was so angry that he fired Perlman. (The manuscript later became the basis for Perlman's own The History of Trade Unionism in the United States.)

Desperate for income, Perlman tried to obtain a professorial position. He interviewed at Cornell University and the University of Arkansas, but antisemitic trustees and administrators kept him from winning an appointment at either institution. Ely blocked him from getting an appointment at the University of Wisconsin–Madison, but in the summer of 1918 Ely was removed as chairman of the department of economics. The instigator of the rebellion was Ella Commons, who coordinated a series of promotions, votes and organizational changes which forced Ely out and permitted Perlman to obtain an assistant professor position.

Perlman helped promote institutionalism and Hegelian historicism as important theoretical approaches to the study of economics, labor and labor unions.

John R. Commons, the founder of labor economics in America, was not originally a historian. Yet Commons was strongly committed to historical research. "I cannot bring in... an employers' association and a trade union, put them in a glass case... watch them tussle, higgle, settle their differences -- the way Sir John Lubbock did when he studied bees and ants", he told an audience in 1907. Commons believed that unions must shun radicalism to survive in the United States and used historical illustrations to advance his conviction. Between the world wars Commons's protégés, such as Edwin Witte and Selig Perlman, pushed the historical approach to Industrial Relations even further.

Perlman's theoretical approach was politically detached and relied heavily on data collection, a model which would dominate labor history well into the 1960s. However, Perlman did show signs of breaking away from the Wisconsin school's emphasis on organizations. His study of Marx had left him with an understanding of the importance of class in social movements, although his sense of the concept was limited to an economic understanding and not as broad as British labor historian E. P. Thompson's.

In 1928, Perlman published his most famous work, A Theory of the Labor Movement. Karl Marx and Vladimir Lenin had argued that unions too often pursued improvements in wages and working conditions rather than advocating revolution. Intellectuals, it was argued, had to take over labor unions to prevent such bourgeois inclinations. Perlman criticized this theory by arguing that workers in the United States were not, in fact, alienated as they were in Europe. Rather, in the U.S., the source of owner-worker conflict was not capitalism per se but the downward pressure on wages exerted by a marketplace free from internal tariffs. Unions formed, Perlman argued, as a means for workers to maintain high wages. It was correct, not an aberration, for unions to focus solely on wages and working conditions, he wrote. In response, Perlman developed the "business unionism" model of labor, where the goals of unions are defined by their members. It was an ingenious and effective critique, and one which had a large impact on the American labor movement.

In time, a chair was named for Commons in the economics department, and Perlman appointed to that position. Perlman taught a number of students who later went on to influential careers as economists, historians and politicians in their own right. Some of his most notable students were two-term Wisconsin governor Philip La Follette, labor historian Philip Taft, and renowned sociologist C. Wright Mills, whose early analysis of trade union leadership was greatly influenced by Perlman.

Perlman also continued to exercise his religious beliefs throughout his academic career. Although his extreme shyness kept him out of university politics or the media, he worked extensively with the university's Hillel Foundation. And, despite the disparity in their economic views, Perlman became good friends with economist Milton Friedman.

In 1929, Eva Perlman died. Selig Perlman subsequently married Eva's younger sister Fannie, and had two daughters, Eva and Rachel.

At the end of 1958, Perlman turned 70, which was the mandatory retirement age at the university, and he was forced to retire the following June. Perlman received an appointment as a visiting professor at the Wharton School of the University of Pennsylvania. Earlier that year, he had undergone prostate surgery, which had left him weak. In August, he suffered a stroke which may have been related to his prior surgery. He lingered for seven days, then died on August 14, 1959, aged 70.

== Assessment ==
Perlman is recognized as one of the leading labor historians of the first half of the 20th century. His book, A Theory of the Labor Movement, "left an indelible impression on a generation of teachers and trade union personnel."

Nevertheless, many scholars have questioned Perlman's conclusions. They challenge his conclusion that American workers were not and are not radical.

[Perlman] condemned the role of intellectuals in the US labor movement. They were outsiders, guilty of leading workers astray in pursuit of utopian (that is, communist) visions. Perlman did not believe that people from the working class who became intellectuals would be taken in by the likes of Marx and Engels. Labor's real, "home-grown" or "organic" intellectuals, were pragmatic, accepting of capitalism and content to win for workers as much as they could gain within its framework. But Perlman was profoundly wrong.

For these critics, business unionism has not only proven to be a failure but in fact has been supplanted by social movement unionism in the last six decades. Practitioners of the "new labor history", in particular, see the role of academics as assisting in the growth and development of labor unions rather than as sort of Marxist Svengali leading it to its doom.

Other critics point out that Perlman's work contains biases not readily apparent. Perlman may have held some racist views (particularly toward Asians) which limited his understanding of the evolution of the labor movement. It is fairly clear that his concept of class was limited to economics, and did not include race, status, ethnicity, or other sociological factors.

Selig Perlman, himself an immigrant and a labor historian in the pioneering "Wisconsin school" of historiography, praised the Chinese Exclusion Act of 1882: "Without it," he wrote in The History of Trade Unionism in the United States (1922), "the entire country might have been overrun by Mongolian labor and the labor movement might have become a conflict of races instead of one of classes." These theoretical blinders, critics argue, led Perlman to focus on grand theories about the rise of labor unions rather than to document and analyze the broader social, cultural and economic trends at work in history.

Nevertheless, critics agree that Perlman holds a significant and meaningful place in the development of labor history.

Perlman and Taft's 1935 History of Labor in the United States, 1896-1932 is a thoroughly researched descriptive account of the wide-ranging tactics and strategies of labor conflicts during this period. In particular, they detail that contrary to mainstream accounts the refusal of corporations to negotiate, government institutions and officials in owners' pockets, and facing the use of legal and military repression workers were forced to escalate their tactics in self-defense.

== Memberships ==
Selig Perlman was notorious for never attending university meetings, or participating in professional or academic conferences. He never held any memberships in professional organizations.

== Family ==
Selig Perlman's niece is the writer and etiquette authority Judith Martin, better known as "Miss Manners."

== Published works ==
=== Solely authored books ===
- A History of Trade Unionism in the United States. New York: Macmillan, 1922.
- Lectures on Capitalism and Socialism. A.L. Riesch, ed. Madison: University of Wisconsin Press, 1976. ISBN 0-299-06780-7
- A Theory of the Labor Movement. New York: Macmillan, 1928.

=== Co-authored books ===
- Perlman, Selig and Philip Taft. "History of Labor in the United States, 1896-1932." Volume IV, Labor Movements. New York: Macmillan, 1935.
- Commons, John R. and Perlman, Selig. The Economics of Collective Action. Kenneth H. Parsons, ed. New York: Macmillan, 1950.
- Commons, John R., et al. A History of Labor in the United States. Vols. 1-4. New York: Macmillan, 1918–1935.

=== Solely authored articles ===
- "The Basic Philosophy of the American Labor Movement." Annals of the American Academy of Political and Social Science. 274 (March 1951).
