= Scranton Declaration =

The Scranton Declaration, sometimes called the Autonomy Declaration, was passed in 1901 by the American Federation of Labor (AFL) and made craft autonomy, or craft unionism, the cornerstone of the organization. Craft unionism meant that unions were formed on the basis of the trade practiced by a group of skilled workers, in contrast to industrial unionism.

For example, in the printing trades, a printer had once been able to perform all the duties in the print shop, but with the development of machinery and printing techniques, different skills became necessary for each step of the printing process. These skills developed into separate trades, and the printing process involved "compositors, pressmen, feeders, stereotypers, bookbinders, electrotypers, and photoengravers." These various trades had all belonged to the Typographical Union, but between 1889 and 1903 all except for the compositors left to form their own craft unions. The AFL supported this process of separation by skill.

In some cases, the AFL forced affiliates to merge. After a decade of jurisdictional warfare between the United Brotherhood of Carpenters and Joiners (UBCJ) and the Amalgamated Wood-Workers International (AWWI), which did the same type of work, the UBCJ threatened to secede from the federation. The AFL revoked the charter of the weaker AWWI and forced them to join the Carpenters' union.

Some powerful AFL affiliates successfully resisted pressure to split into separate crafts. The United Mine Workers had been formed as an industrial union. They demanded, and were granted, the right to include craftsmen – "hoisting engineers, firemen, blacksmiths, carpenters" – into their industrial union locals.

The Scranton Declaration was re-affirmed in 1912, repudiating an argument made by the Industrial Workers of the World that trade unions are too rigid to meet changing demands. About one-third of the delegates voted for an industrial union proposal put forward by the AFL-affiliated United Mine Workers. Even so, by 1922 the AFL had repeatedly voted down all resolutions endorsing industrial unionism.

== See also ==
- Labor federation competition in the U.S.
