= Philip Taft =

American economist (1902–1976)

- Born: March 22, 1902; Syracuse, New York, U.S.
- Died: November 17, 1976 (aged 74); Providence, Rhode Island, U.S.

Academic background
- Education: University of Wisconsin–Madison
- Thesis: History of Labor in the United States, 1896–1932 (1935)

Academic work
- Discipline: History
- Sub-discipline: American labor history
- Institutions: Brown University

Philip Taft (March 22, 1902 – November 17, 1976) was an American labor historian whose research focused on the labor history of the United States and the American Federation of Labor.

== Early life ==
Taft was born on March 22, 1902, in Syracuse, New York. His father died when he was still a young boy. His mother moved the family to New York City, where she took up work as a house cleaner.

Living in youth hostels and traveling the country by hopping trains, he took a long series of odd and day-laborer jobs: errand boy, factory worker, stable boy, power plant worker, ore freighter coalman, farm hand, oil field worker, mule skinner, and many more. Taft joined the Industrial Workers of the World (IWW) and, while working in the northern Great Plains as a harvest hand, became an organizer. Later he assisted with legal defense of IWW members in New York City where he was befriended by Roger Baldwin, a founder of the American Civil Liberties Union.

== Education and career ==
Taft attended night school in New York City and obtained a high school diploma in 1928. At the age of 26, he enrolled at the University of Wisconsin–Madison and graduated in 1932 with a bachelor's degree in economics. He then entered the doctoral program in economics at the University of Wisconsin–Madison. In graduate school, he took a job conducting research for one of his professors, Selig Perlman. Taft's contribution to the work was so significant that Perlman made him a co-author on volume four of History of Labor in the United States in 1935. In the same year he earned his doctorate.

Taft worked for the Wisconsin Industrial Commission and the federal Resettlement Administration before taking a job as an associate economist at the Social Security Administration in 1936. He was appointed an assistant professor of economics at Brown University in Providence, Rhode Island, in 1937. He was chairman of the Economics Department from 1949 to 1953.

Throughout his tenure at Brown, Taft sought to use the university's expertise to improve society. In 1950, President Harry S. Truman appointed Taft to a committee of experts on the New England economy under the aegis of the President's Council of Economic Advisors. In 1952, Taft pushed Brown University to join with a newly formed Rhode Island businessmen's committee to study the economic problems of the state. In 1963, Taft won a grant from the Ford Foundation to study the financial difficulties confronting, and the economic impact of, an aging populace.

Taft was appointed in 1961 to a committee on labor-management reports established by the US Department of Labor, where he helped advise the department and draft rules implementing the Landrum–Griffin Act.

== Retirement and later life ==
Taft retired from teaching in 1968. He maintained an office at Brown, however, and continued to conduct research. In 1975, he was awarded a Guggenheim Fellowship to study the history of the labor movement in Alabama.

He became an acquaintance of AFL–CIO president George Meany, who thought highly of Taft's intelligence and ability to quickly analyze any situation.

Philip Taft died in Providence on November 17, 1976, at the age of 74.

== Impact on the field of labor studies ==
Taft was and remains a well-known and well-regarded labor historian. His The Structure and Government of Labor Unions was the first work to detail the organizational structure and governance practices of American labor unions, and is considered a fine application of organizational theory to labor unions.

His "The A.F. of L. in the Time of Gompers", published in 1957, was for many years seen as the definitive history of the American Federation of Labor. Nearly 50 years later, it is still routinely cited by labor historians.

To many in the American labor movement, Taft was a highly regarded and sympathetic scholar. Two months before Taft's death, George Meany summed up the labor movement's gratitude by writing, "Generations of students will continue to benefit from your scholarship and understanding of the economic, social and human aspects of the world of work."

In 1977, Cornell University instituted the Philip Taft Labor History Book Award prize. The highly sought-after and prestigious annual award goes to a book of original research which explores

...the history of workers (free and unfree, organized and unorganized), their institutions, and their workplaces, as well as scholarship that explores the ways in which broader historical trends have shaped working-class life, including but not limited to: immigration, slavery, community, the state, race, gender, and ethnicity.

Taft's papers are maintained at the Kheel Center for Labor-Management Documentation and Archives, which is housed at the Catherwood Library at Cornell University. The records consist mainly of research notes which Taft gathered while writing manuscripts. The archives include numerous original documents found nowhere else. The records are particularly detailed in regard to labor organizations outside the United States; the AFL–CIO's foreign affairs policies; maritime unions; labor's involvement with the National Industrial Recovery Act; the National Labor Relations Board; organized crime and unions; labor and the steel industry; teacher unions; and labor's involvement in national mobilization and economic policy during the two world wars.

== Selected books ==
=== Solely authored works ===
- The A.F. of L. from the Death of Gompers to the Merger. Hardback reprint ed. New York: Harper & Brothers, 1959. ISBN 0-374-97714-3
- The A.F. of L. in the Time of Gompers. Hardback reprint. New York: Harper & Brothers, 1957. ISBN 0-374-97734-8
- Corruption and Racketeering in the Labor Movement. Ithaca, N.Y.: Cornell University, 1970. ISBN 0-87546-247-2
- Economics and Problems of Labor. Harrisburg, Pa.: Stackpole, 1942.
- Labor Politics American Style: The California State Federation of Labor. Cambridge, Mass.: Harvard University Press, 1968. ISBN 0-674-50800-9
- Organized Labor in American History. New York: Harper & Brothers, 1964. ISBN 1-299-44114-9
- Organizing Dixie: Alabama Workers in the Industrial Era. Reprint ed. Greenwood, Colo.: Greenwood Press, 1981. ISBN 0-313-21447-6
- The Structure and Government of Labor Unions. Cambridge, Mass.: Harvard University Press, 1954. ISBN 1-135-56116-8
- United They Teach: The Story of the United Federation of Teachers. Los Angeles: Nash Publishing, 1974. ISBN 0-8402-1331-X

=== Co-authored works ===
- Philip Taft; Selig Perlman (1935). History of Labor in the United States, 1896–1932. Vol. Four. Macmillan.
