= David Montgomery (historian) =

American historian (1927–2011)

David Montgomery (December 1, 1927 – December 2, 2011) was a Farnam Professor of History at Yale University. Montgomery was considered one of the foremost academics specializing in United States labor history and wrote extensively on the subject. He is credited, along with David Brody and Herbert Gutman, with founding the field of "new labor history" in the U.S.

== Biography ==
=== Early years ===
Montgomery entered undergraduate school at Swarthmore College following a stint in the U.S. Army Corps of Engineers, from which he was honorably discharged as a staff sergeant. He graduated in 1950 with Highest Honors and a Bachelor of Arts degree in political science.

Over the next 10 years, Montgomery worked as a machinist—first in New York City and later in Saint Paul, Minnesota. Montgomery became involved in union activity as an active member of the United Electrical Workers, the International Association of Machinists, and the Teamsters where he held numerous positions including shop steward, legislative committee member, and local executive board member. Montgomery may have been repeatedly targeted by the FBI when he was a labor organizer among machinists in Saint Paul.

Montgomery became a member of the Communist Party USA in 1951 or 1952 due to the party's positions on international issues, racial justice and social unionism. He was active with the party in New York City and briefly in St. Paul. He left the party around 1957.

Montgomery's experience in the Communist Party clearly influenced his research interest in labor radicalism, among other issues, throughout his scholarly career.

=== Academic career ===
In 1959, Montgomery entered graduate school at the University of Minnesota, from which he received his Ph.D. in 1962. The next year he was hired as an assistant professor of history at the University of Pittsburgh, where he remained for the next 14 years. At the University of Pittsburgh, Montgomery wrote his first book, Beyond Equality: Labor and the Radical Republicans, 1862-1872, which was published in 1967. On sabbatical from that institution, Montgomery spent two years working in England with historian E. P. Thompson to establish the Centre for the Study of Social History at the University of Warwick. He subsequently held visiting teacher positions at Oxford University and a number of other universities in Brazil, Canada, and the Netherlands.

On his return to the United States, Montgomery returned to the University of Pittsburgh, becoming chair of the department. He was recruited by several other institutions, eventually accepting a position at Yale. Montgomery taught courses about the history of working people in the United States, the Civil War and Reconstruction, and immigration. In 1988, his book The Fall of the House of Labor: The Workplace, the State, and American Labor Activism, 1865-1925, was published to wide acclaim. Noam Chomsky, the renowned professor of linguistics at the Massachusetts Institute of Technology and political activist, called the book one of the definitive works on the American labor struggle. The book was a Pulitzer Prize finalist nominee.

Following the example of British historian E. P. Thompson, Montgomery encouraged a generation of labor historians to re-examine the core subject matter of labor history, thus defining the new labor history, which examines working-class culture, rather than simply their organizations. He was also influential through his editorship of the journal International Labor and Working-Class History.

In 2001, Montgomery published a book in collaboration with Professor Horace Huntley of the Birmingham Civil Rights Institute. The book, Black Workers' Struggle for Equality in Birmingham, uses oral histories to interpret and explore the involvement of African American workers in various unions and the organized labor movement for civil rights.

During the 1990s, Montgomery wrote and spoke about academic freedom, calling for wider availability of information for research and in favor of a larger scope of academic freedom. He claimed that over the presidential administrations of George W. Bush and Bill Clinton, access to government documents had been sharply reduced and that this has resulted in less academic freedom. Additionally, Montgomery criticized the Patriot Act and its provisions for surveillance of academics and librarians, arguing they impede academic freedom.

He also served as president of the Organization of American Historians (OAH) from 1999 to 2000.

=== Death and legacy ===
Montgomery died from complications of a brain hemorrhage at Thomas Jefferson University Hospital in Philadelphia, on December 2, 2011, one day after turning 84.

In the spring of 2012 the executive board of the Organization of American Historians approved a new book award in the field of labor and working class history to be named after David Montgomery. Fundraising was begun to build a $50,000 endowment for the prize, after which time the David Montgomery award is to be presented annually by the OAH in conjunction with the Labor and Working-Class History Association.

== Works ==
- Beyond Equality: Labor and the Radical Republicans, 1862-1872. Illini Books ed. Champaign, Ill.: University of Illinois Press, 1981. ISBN 0-252-00869-3
- Black Workers' Struggle for Equality in Birmingham. Champaign, Ill.: University of Illinois Press, 2004. ISBN 0-252-02952-6
- Citizen Worker: The Experience of Workers in the United States with Democracy and the Free Market during the Nineteenth Century. New York: Cambridge University Press, 1994. ISBN 0-521-42057-1
- The Fall of the House of Labor: The Workplace, the State, and American Labor Activism, 1865-1925. New York: Press Syndicate of the University of Cambridge, 1987. ISBN 0-521-22579-5
- Workers' Control in America: Studies in the History of Work, Technology, and Labor Struggles. New York: Cambridge University Press, 1979. ISBN 0-521-22580-9
