= David Brody (historian) =

American historian (born 1930)

David Brody (born June 5, 1930) is an American historian, who is professor emeritus of history at the University of California-Davis.

== Life and education ==
Brody was born in Elizabeth, New Jersey, his parents had immigrated to the United States. Working his way through Harvard University, he received his bachelor's degree in 1952, a master's degree in 1953 and Ph.D. in history in 1958. His dissertation director was Oscar Handlin.

As Brody explains, he did not intend to become a labor historian:

Why I became a labor historian was partly a matter of background. My parents were immigrants (as, historically, were the vast majority of working people in the United States), I grew up in the working-class neighborhoods of a small industrial city, and I worked my way through college (with the aid of scholarships) in dining rooms, shoe stores, and factories. Studying history after World War II, I was both excited by the new scholarship in American social history and bothered that so little of it explored the experience of workers. But, in the end, what turned me to labor history was the discovery in graduate school of how interesting the problems and how rich the materials were for that subject. I have to acknowledge a strong element of accident in this discovery. While I ended up writing about iron and steelworkers, I had, in fact, started my thesis believing my topic was about World War I and its impact on popular ideology!

== Research focus ==
Brody's research focuses on the American labor movement and American history. Along with David Montgomery and Herbert Gutman, he is credited with founding the field of "new labor history" in North America, which examined working-class culture rather than simply workers' organizations as a source of history.

Brody's most coherent statement of the "new labor history" can be found in his article titled "The Old Labor History and the New: In Search of an American Working Class" (Labor History, 20[1979]: 111–26).

Brody rose to prominence following the 1960 publication of his pioneering history of early steelworker unions, The Steelworkers in America: The Nonunion Era, a book based on his doctoral dissertation. He has written numerous articles and book-length treatments of the ethical, organizational and social construction of work and employment.

In the 21st century, Brody has focused on the origins and transformation of American labor law, labor law reform and weaknesses in the structure and interpretation of the National Labor Relations Act.

Brody is Professor Emeritus at the University of California, Davis, where he taught for many years. He is affiliated with the Institute of Industrial Relations (IIR) at the University of California, Berkeley.

== Memberships and awards ==
Brody is a member of the Society of American Historians and the American Historical Association. He served as president of the Pacific Coast branch of the American Historical Association from 1991 to 1992. He is also a member of the Organization of American Historians, and served on the group's executive board from 1976 to 1979.

Brody was a senior fellow for the National Endowment for the Humanities in 1978. He won a Guggenheim Memorial Foundation fellowship in 1983, and was appointed as a senior professor in the Fulbright Program in 1975. In 2008 he won the Sol Stetin Award for Labor History from the Sidney Hillman Foundation and a Distinguished Service to Labor and Working-Class History Award from the Labor and Working-Class History Association.

Brody is a member of Local 3 (San Francisco Chapter) of the National Writers Union, Local 1981, United Auto Workers, AFL-CIO.

== Books by David Brody ==
=== Sole author ===
- Steelworkers in America: The Nonunion Era. Cambridge, Mass.: Harvard University Press, 1960; Illini Book edition. Urbana, Ill.: University of Illinois Press, 1998. ISBN 978-0-252-06713-6
- The Butcher Workmen: A Study of Unionization. Cambridge, Mass.: Harvard University Press, 1964. ISBN 978-0-674-08925-9
- Labor in Crisis: The Steel Strike of 1919. Philadelphia: J.B. Lippincott, 1965; Urbana, Ill.: University of Illinois Press, 1987. ISBN 978-0-252-01373-7
- Essays on the Age of Enterprise: 1870-1900. Ft. Worth: Dryden Press, 1974. ISBN 978-0-03-084406-5
- The American Labor Movement. Reprint ed. Lanham, Md.: University Press of America, 1985. ISBN 978-0-8191-4667-0
- In Labor's Cause: Main Themes on the History of the American Worker. New York: Oxford University Press USA, 1993. ISBN 978-0-19-506791-0
- Workers in Industrial America: Essays on the Twentieth-Century Struggle. 2nd ed. New York: Oxford University Press USA, 1993. ISBN 978-0-19-504504-8
- Labor Embattled: History, Power, Rights. Urbana, Ill.: University of Illinois Press, 2005. Cloth ISBN 978-0-252-03004-8; Paperback ISBN 978-0-252-07246-8

=== Co-written works ===
- Henretta, James A.; Brody, David; and Dumenil, Lynn. America: A Concise History. Volume 2: Since 1865. 5th ed. New York: Bedford/St. Martin's, 2005. ISBN 978-0-312-41641-6
- Henretta, James A.; Brody, David; Dumenil, Lynn; and Ware, Susan. America's History. Volume I: To 1877. 5th ed. New York: Bedford/St. Martin's, 2003. ISBN 978-0-312-40934-0

=== Important articles ===
- "Labor History, Industrial Relations, and the Crisis of American Labor." Industrial and Labor Relations Review. 43(1989): 8.
- "The Old Labor History and the New: In Search of an American Working Class." Labor History. 20(1979): 111–26.

== See also ==
- Labor history (discipline)
