= Joseph A. McCartin =

American historian

- Born: May 12, 1959 (age 67); Chelsea, Massachusetts, U.S.

Academic background
- Education: College of the Holy Cross (BA); Binghamton University (MA, PhD)
- Thesis: Labor's 'Great War': American Workers, Unions, and the State, 1916–1920 (1990)

Academic work
- Discipline: Labor history
- Institutions: Georgetown University

Joseph Anthony McCartin (born May 12, 1959) is an American historian known for his research on labor unions in the United States. He is a professor of history at Georgetown University, where he is the executive director of the Kalmanovitz Initiative for Labor and the Working Poor.

== Early life and education ==
McCartin was born in Chelsea, Massachusetts, in 1959. He is of Irish descent and was raised in Troy, New York. His father, Joseph McCartin, was the deputy commissioner of the New York State Office of Parks, Recreation and Historic Preservation. His mother, Marybeth McCartin, was a public school teacher.

McCartin graduated from the College of the Holy Cross in Worcester, Massachusetts, with a Bachelor of Arts in history in 1981. He then earned a Master of Arts in history in 1985 and his Ph.D. in history in 1990 from Binghamton University. His doctoral dissertation was titled, Labor's 'Great War': American Workers, Unions, and the State, 1916–1920.

From 1990 to 1992, he was a lecturer at the University of Rhode Island. In 1992, he was appointed an assistant professor at the State University of New York at Geneseo. In 1998 he was promoted to associate professor, and in 1999, McCartin took a position at Georgetown University in Washington, D.C., where he is now a professor and the executive director of the Kalmanovitz Initiative for Labor and the Working Poor.

His brother is noted Catholic historian James McCartin.

== Research focus ==
McCartin is a historical institutionalist whose research focuses on the history of labor unions in the United States during the 20th century. McCartin is a strong advocate of industrial democracy, an economic arrangement in which workers share in the management of the workplace. He has challenged many of the labor movement's closely held beliefs, including the idea that the PATCO air traffic controllers' strike of 1981 began, rather than culminated, an attack on labor rights in the United States. According to the review by Braham Dabscheck in a leading British scholarly journal, his Collision Course;

provides a compelling and thorough account of the background to this dispute, its machinations and broader implications. It is a tour-de-force, an exemplary work of scholarship....he interviewed more than 100 people involved in the dispute....[He] hunted down official sources and documents as well as the records and memorabilia of PATCO and its members and supporters in various facilities across the nation. His narrative includes blow-by-blow accounts of meetings and negotiation sessions held, whether they are within PATCO, the FAA and the White House or across the bargaining table.

== Awards ==
McCartin's 1997 book, Labor’s Great War: The Struggle for Industrial Democracy and the Origins of Modern American Labor Relations, 1912-21, won the 1999 Philip Taft Labor History Book Award for the best book on labor history.

McCartin's article, " 'Fire the Hell Out of Them': Sanitation Workers' Struggles and the Normalization of the Striker Replacement Strategy in the 1970s", won the Labor: Studies in Working-Class History of the Americas prize as the best article on labor history published in 2005.

McCartin was named a fellow of the National Endowment for the Humanities in 1993 and again in 2002. In 2003, he was named a Charles Warren Fellow at Harvard University.

== Bibliography ==
=== Books ===
- Labor’s Great War: The Struggle for Industrial Democracy and the Origins of Modern American Labor Relations, 1912-21. Chapel Hill: The University of North Carolina Press, 1997. ISBN 0-8078-4679-1
- Dubofsky, Melvyn. We Shall Be All: A History of the Industrial Workers of the World. Abridged edition. Joseph A. McCartin, ed. Urbana: University of Illinois Press, 2000. ISBN 0-252-06905-6
- McCartin, Joseph A. and Dubofsky, Melvyn. American Labor: A Documentary Collection. New York: Palgrave-Macmillan, 2004. ISBN 0-312-29564-2
- Kazin, Michael and McCartin, Joseph A, eds. Americanism: New Perspectives on the History of an Ideal. Chapel Hill: University of North Carolina Press, 2006. ISBN 0-8078-3010-0
- Collision Course: Ronald Reagan, the Air Traffic Controllers, and the Strike that Changed America. Oxford University Press, 2011. ISBN 978-0199325207
- Leon Fink, Joseph A. McCartin, and Joan Sangster, eds. Workers in Hard Times: A Long View of Economic Crises. University of Illinois Press, 2014. ISBN 978-0252038174.
- Milkman, Ruth. What Works for Workers: Public Policies and Innovative Strategies for Low Wage Workers. Stephanie Luce, Jennifer Luff, and Joseph A. McCartin, eds. Russell Sage Foundation Publications, 2014. ISBN 978-0871545718

=== Articles and book chapters ===
- "Democratizing the Demand for Workers’ Rights: Toward a Reframing of Labor's Argument." Dissent. 2005.
- " 'Fire the Hell Out of Them': Sanitation Workers’ Struggles and the Normalization of the Striker Replacement Strategy in the 1970s." Labor: Studies in the Working-Class History. 2:3 (2005).
- "Bringing the State’s Workers In: Time to Rectify an Imbalanced U.S. Labor Historiography." Labor History. 47:1 (2006).
- "Re-Framing the Crisis of U.S. Labor: Rights, Democracy, and Political Economy." Labour/Le Travail. 2007.
- "Utraque Unum: Finding My Way as a Catholic and a Historian." In Faith and the Historian: Catholic Perspectives. Nick Salvatore, ed. Urbana: University of Illinois Press, 2007. ISBN 0-252-03143-1
- "Managing Discontent: The Life and Career of Leamon Hood, Black Public Employee Union Activist." In The Black Worker: Race, Labor, and Civil Rights Since Emancipation. Eric Arnesen, ed. Urbana: University of Illinois Press, 2007. ISBN 0-252-07380-0
- McCartin, Joseph A. (January 2023). "Supplicant or partner? Lessons of the rail crisis". Commonweal. 150 (1): 16–17.
