= We Shall Be All =

1969 book

- Author: Melvyn Dubofsky
- Subject: Labor history
- Publisher: Quadrangle Books
- Publication date: 1969
- Pages: 557

We Shall Be All: A History of the Industrial Workers of the World is a 1969 history book about the Industrial Workers of the World by Melvyn Dubofsky.

== Bibliography ==
- Alexander, Joseph (1970). "Review of We Shall Be All: A History of the Industrial Workers of the World". Industrial and Labor Relations Review. 23 (4): 612–614. doi:10.2307/2521504. ISSN 0019-7939. JSTOR 2521504.
- Barbash, Jack (1970). "Review of We Shall Be All: A History of the Industrial Workers of the World". The Annals of the American Academy of Political and Social Science. 391: 235–236. ISSN 0002-7162. JSTOR 1040092.
- Betten, Neil (1973). "Review of We Shall Be All. The History of the Industrial Workers of the World". The Catholic Historical Review. 59 (3): 500–501. ISSN 0008-8080. JSTOR 25019416.
- Brody, David (1971). "Review of We Shall Be All". Political Science Quarterly. 86 (4): 686–688. doi:10.2307/2147473. ISSN 0032-3195. JSTOR 2147473.
- Cleland, Hugh G. (1971). "Review of We Shall Be All: A History of the Industrial Workers of the World; Joe Hill; Bread and Roses Too: Studies of the Wobblies". The American Historical Review. 76 (1): 214–215. doi:10.2307/1869892. ISSN 0002-8762. JSTOR 1869892.
- Conlin, Joseph R. (1970). "Review of We Shall Be All: A History of the Industrial Workers of the World". The Wisconsin Magazine of History. 53 (4): 310. ISSN 0043-6534. JSTOR 4634568.
- Farber, Milton (1989). "Review of We Shall Be All: A History of the Industrial Workers of the World". Illinois Historical Journal. 82 (2): 138–139. ISSN 0748-8149. JSTOR 40192490.
- Grob, Gerald N. (1970). "Review of We Shall Be All: A History of the Industrial Workers of the World". The Journal of Economic History. 30 (3): 669–671. doi:10.1017/S0022050700086356. ISSN 0022-0507. JSTOR 2116919.
- Hyman, Harold M. (1970). "Review of We Shall Be All: A History of the Industrial Workers of the World; The Founding Convention of the IWW: Proceedings; Joe Hill: A Biographical Novel". Forest History Newsletter. 14 (2): 35. doi:10.2307/4004122. ISSN 0015-7422. JSTOR 4004122.
- Miller, Sally M. (1970). "Review of We Shall Be All: A History of the Industrial Workers of the World". American Quarterly. 22 (2): 274. doi:10.2307/2712104. ISSN 0003-0678. JSTOR 2712104.
- Morgan, George T. (1970). "Review of We Shall Be All: A History of the Industrial Workers of the World". The Journal of Southern History. 36 (2): 298–300. doi:10.2307/2205901. ISSN 0022-4642. JSTOR 2205901.
- Munk, Michael (2001). "Review of We Shall Be All: A History of the Industrial Workers of the World". The Pacific Northwest Quarterly. 93 (1): 44–45. ISSN 0030-8803. JSTOR 40492828.
- Murray, Robert K. (1970). "Review of We Shall Be All: A History of the Industrial Workers of the World". The Journal of American History. 57 (1): 183–185. doi:10.2307/1900617. ISSN 0021-8723. JSTOR 1900617.
- Rayback, Joseph G. (1971). "Review of We Shall Be All; A History of the Industrial Workers of the World". Journal of Social History. 4 (3): 297–300. doi:10.1353/jsh/4.3.297. ISSN 0022-4529. JSTOR 3786708.
- Rolland, Siegfried B. (1970). "Review of We Shall Be All: A History of the Industrial Workers of the World". The Pacific Northwest Quarterly. 61 (4): 230–231. ISSN 0030-8803. JSTOR 40488854.
- "Symposium on Melvyn Dubofsky's We Shall Be All". Labor History. 40 (3): 345–369. 1999. doi:10.1080/00236719912331387682. ISSN 0023-656X – via Taylor & Francis.
- Tyler, Gus (1970). "Radical spirit". Monthly Labor Review. 93 (1): 81–82. ISSN 0098-1818. JSTOR 41837804.
- Whitten, Woodrow C. (1970). "Review of We Shall Be All: A History of the Industrial Workers of the World". Pacific Historical Review. 39 (3): 397–398. doi:10.2307/3637672. ISSN 0030-8684. JSTOR 3637672.
- Widenor, Marcus (2001). "Review of We Shall Be All: A History of the Industrial Workers of the World". Oregon Historical Quarterly. 102 (2): 253–256. ISSN 0030-4727. JSTOR 20615148.
