= Labor history =

Sub-discipline of social history

Labor history is a sub-discipline of social history which specializes on the history of the working classes and the labor movement. Labor historians may concern themselves with issues of gender, race, ethnicity, and other factors besides class but chiefly focus on urban or industrial societies which distinguishes it from rural history.

The central concerns of labor historians include industrial relations and forms of labor protest (strikes, lock-outs), the rise of mass politics (especially the rise of socialism) and the social and cultural history of the industrial working classes.

Labor history developed in tandem with the growth of a self-conscious working-class political movement in many Western countries in the latter half of the nineteenth century.

Whilst early labor historians were drawn to protest movements such as Luddism and Chartism, the focus of labor history was often on institutions: chiefly the labor unions and political parties. Exponents of this institutional approach included Sidney and Beatrice Webb. The work of the Webbs, and other pioneers of the discipline, was marked by optimism about the capacity of the labor movement to effect fundamental social change and a tendency to see its development as a process of steady, inevitable and unstoppable progress.

As two contemporary labor historians have noted, early work in the field was "designed to service and celebrate the Labor movement."

== Marxist influence ==
In the 1950s to 1970s, labor history was redefined and expanded in focus by a number of historians, amongst whom the most prominent and influential figures were E. P. Thompson and Eric Hobsbawm. The motivation came from current left-wing politics in Britain and the United States and reached red-hot intensity. Kenneth O. Morgan, a more traditional liberal historian, explains the dynamic:

the ferocity of argument owed more to current politics, the unions' winter of discontent [in 1979], and rise of a hard-left militant tendency within the world of academic history as well as within the Labour Party. The new history was often strongly Marxist, which fed through the work of brilliant evangelists like Raphael Samuel into the New Left Review, a famous journal like Past and Present, the Society of Labour History and the work of a large number of younger scholars engaged in the field. Non-scholars like Tony Benn joined in. The new influence of Marxism upon Labour studies came to affect the study of history as a whole.

Morgan sees benefits:

In many ways, this was highly beneficial: it encouraged the study of the dynamics of social history rather than a narrow formal institutional view of labor and the history of the Labour Party; it sought to place the experience of working people within a wider technical and ideological context; it encouraged a more adventurous range of sources, 'history from below' so-called, and rescued them from what Thompson memorably called the 'condescension of posterity'; it brought the idea of class centre-stage in the treatment of working-class history, where I had always felt it belonged; it shed new light on the poor and dispossessed for whom the source materials were far more scrappy than those for the bourgeoisie, and made original use of popular evidence like oral history, not much used before.

Morgan tells of the downside as well:

But the Marxist – or sometimes Trotskyist – emphasis in Labour studies was too often doctrinaire and intolerant of non-Marxist dissent – it was also too often plain wrong, distorting the evidence within a narrow doctrinaire framework. I felt it incumbent upon me to help rescue it. But this was not always fun. I recall addressing a history meeting in Cardiff... when, for the only time in my life, I was subjected to an incoherent series of attacks of a highly personal kind, playing the man not the ball, focusing on my accent, my being at Oxford and the supposedly reactionary tendencies of my empiricist colleagues.

Thompson and Hobsbawm were Marxists who were critical of the existing labor movement in Britain. They were concerned to approach history "from below" and to explore the agency and activity of working people at the workplace, in protest movements and in social and cultural activities. Thompson's seminal study The Making of the English Working Class was particularly influential in setting a new agenda for labor historians and locating the importance of the study of labor for social history in general. Also in the 1950s and 1960s, historians began to give serious attention to groups who had previously been largely neglected, such as women and non-caucasian ethnic groups. Some historians situated their studies of gender and race within a class analysis: for example, C. L. R. James, a Marxist who wrote about the struggles of blacks in the Haitian Revolution. Others questioned whether class was a more important social category than gender or race and pointed to racism, patriarchy and other examples of division and oppression within the working class.

Labor history remains centered on two fundamental sets of interest: institutional histories of workers' organizations, and the "history from below" approach of the Marxist historians.

Despite the influence of the Marxists, many labor historians rejected the revolutionary implications implicit in the work of Thompson, Hobsbawm et al. In the 1980s, the importance of class itself, as an historical social relationship and explanatory concept, began to be widely challenged. Some notable labor historians turned from Marxism to embrace a postmodernist approach, emphasizing the importance of language and questioning whether classes could be so considered if they did not use a "language of class". Other historians emphasized the weaknesses and moderation of the historic labor movement, arguing that social development had been characterized more by accommodation, acceptance of the social order and cross-class collaboration than by conflict and dramatic change.

== United States ==
Labor history in the United States is primarily based in history departments, with occasional representation inside labor unions. The scholarship deals with the institutional history of labor unions and the social history of workers. In recent years there's been special attention to historically marginal groups, especially blacks, women, Hispanics and Asians. The Study Group on International Labor and Working-Class History was established: 1971 and has a membership of 1000. It publishes International Labor and Working-Class History. H-LABOR is a daily email-based discussion group formed in 1993 that reaches over a thousand scholars and advanced students. the Labor and Working-Class History Association formed in 1988 and publishes Labor: Studies in Working-Class History of the Americas.

Prominent scholars include John R. Commons (1862–1945), David Brody (b. 1930), Melvyn Dubofsky, David Montgomery (1927–2011), and Joseph A. McCartin (born 1959).

== United Kingdom ==
Kirk (2010) surveys labor historiography in Britain since the formation of the Society for the Study of Labour History in 1960. He reports that labor history has been mostly pragmatic, eclectic and empirical; it has played an important role in historiographical debates, such as those revolving around history from below, institutionalism versus the social history of labor, class, populism, gender, language, postmodernism and the turn to politics. Kirk rejects suggestions that the field is declining, and stresses its innovation, modification and renewal. Kirk also detects a move into conservative insularity and academicism. He recommends a more extensive and critical engagement with the kinds of comparative, transnational and global concerns increasingly popular among labor historians elsewhere, and calls for a revival of public and political interest in the topics. Meanwhile, Navickas, (2011) examines recent scholarship including the histories of collective action, environment and human ecology, and gender issues, with a focus on work by James Epstein, Malcolm Chase, and Peter Jones.

Outside the Marxist orbit, social historians paid a good deal of attention to labor history as well.

Addison notes that in Britain by the 1990s, labor history was, "in sharp decline", because:

there was no longer much interest in history of the white, male working-class. Instead the 'cultural turn' encouraged historians to explore wartime constructions of gender, race, citizenship and national identity.

== Others ==
For most of its history China had a limited industrial sector, but the Treaty of Shimonoseki brought the growth of factories and a new working class in the country.

== See also ==
- Australian labour movement
- Labor relations in China
- Business history
- Communist Party Historians Group
- Critique of work
- Historiography of the United Kingdom
- New labor history
- History of trade unions in the United Kingdom
- Wisconsin Labor History Society
