= American way =

Lifestyle of people in the United States

The American way of life, also referred to as American way, is a nationalist ethos that adheres to the principles of life, liberty and the pursuit of happiness. At the core of the American way lies a belief in the American Dream, an ideal that is believed to be achievable by any American citizen through hard work and determination. This concept is closely linked to the notion of American exceptionalism, which posits the existence of a distinctive cultural identity of the United States.

== Definition ==
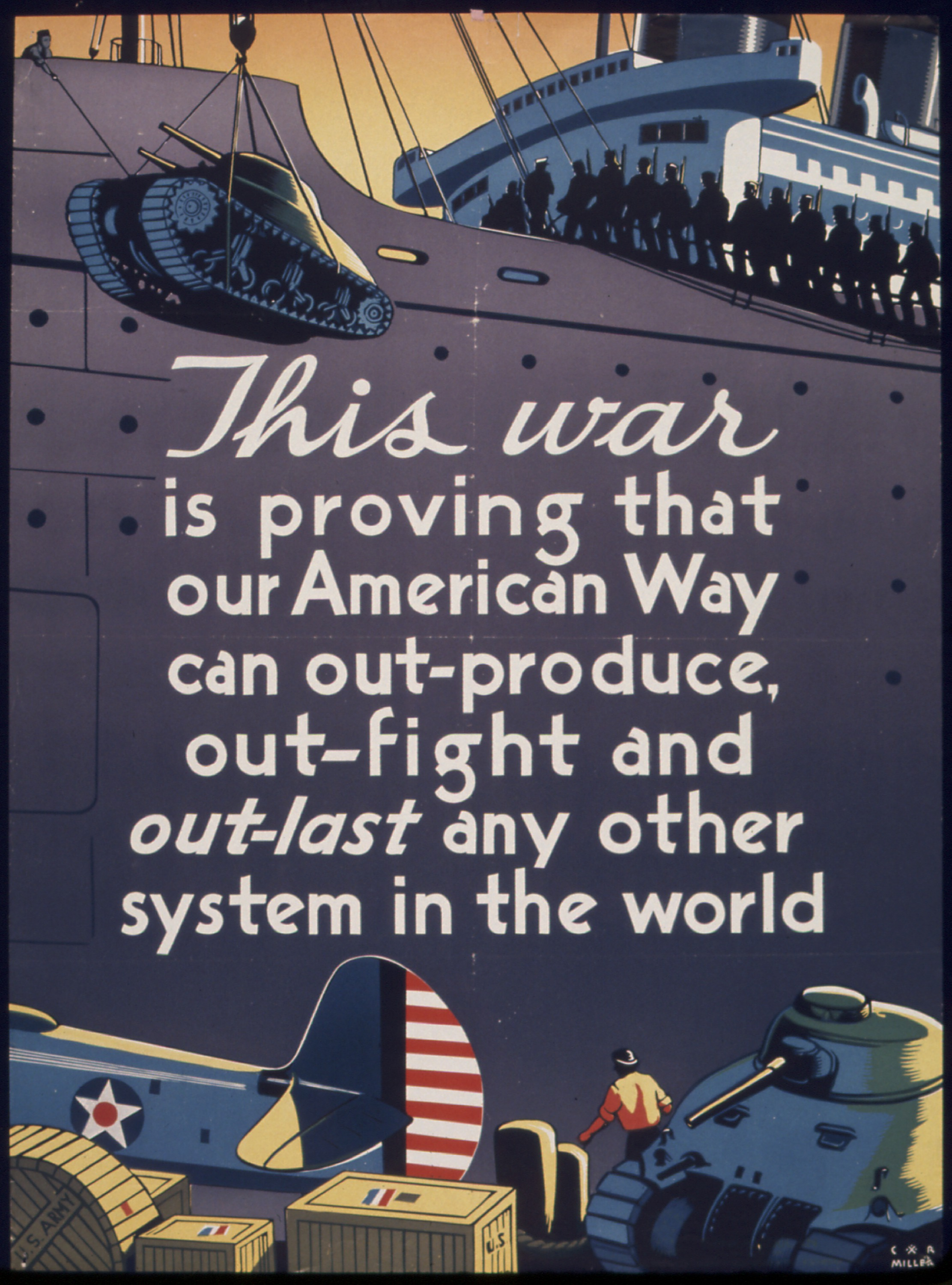
A World War II-era American propaganda poster citing the American way as the source of American effectiveness in the war

American writer and intellectual William Herberg offers the following definition of the American way of life:

The American Way of life is individualistic, dynamic, and pragmatic. It affirms the supreme value and dignity of the individual; it stresses incessant activity on his part, for he is never to rest but is always to be striving to "get ahead"; it defines an ethic of self-reliance, merit, and character, and judges by achievement: "deeds, not creeds" are what count. The "American Way of Life" is humanitarian, "forward-looking", optimistic. Americans are easily the most generous and philanthropic people in the world, in terms of their ready and unstinting response to suffering anywhere on the globe. The American believes in progress, in self-improvement, and quite fanatically in education. But above all, the American is idealistic. Americans cannot go on making money or achieving worldly success simply on its own merits; such "materialistic" things must, in the American mind, be justified in "higher" terms, in terms of "service" or "stewardship" or "general welfare"... And because they are so idealistic, Americans tend to be moralistic; they are inclined to see all issues as plain and simple, black and white, issues of morality.

— William Herberg, Protestant, Catholic, Jew: An Essay in American Religious Sociology (1955)

One commentator notes, "The first half of Herberg's statement still holds true nearly half a century after he first formulated it", even though "Herberg's latter claims have been severely if not completely undermined... materialism no longer needs to be justified in high-sounding terms".

In the National Archives and Records Administration's 1999 Annual Report, National Archivist John W. Carlin writes, "We are different because our government and our way of life are not based on the divine right of kings, the hereditary privileges of elites, or the enforcement of deference to dictators. They are based on pieces of paper, the Charters of Freedom - the Declaration that asserted our independence, the Constitution that created our government, and the Bill of Rights that established our liberties."

== See also ==
- American nationalism
- American System (economic plan)
- American Theocracy
- American imperialism
- Americanism (ideology)
- People for the American Way
- Inventing the "American Way"
- Protestant work ethic
