= Plutonium in the environment =

Plutonium present within the environment

Since the mid-20th century, plutonium in the environment has been primarily produced by human activity. The first plants to produce plutonium for use in Cold War atomic bombs were the Hanford nuclear site in Washington, and the Mayak nuclear plant, in Chelyabinsk Oblast, Russia. Over a period of four decades, "both released more than 200 million curies of radioactive isotopes into the surrounding environment – twice the amount expelled in the Chernobyl disaster in each instance."

The majority of plutonium isotopes are short-lived on a geological timescale, though it has been argued that traces of the long-lived ^{244}Pu isotope still exist in nature. This isotope has been found in lunar soil, meteorites, and in the Oklo natural reactor. However, one study on plutonium in marine sediments indicates that the atomic bomb fallout accounts for 66% of the ^{239}Pu and 59% ^{240}Pu in the English Channel. In contrast, nuclear reprocessing contributes the majority of the ^{238}Pu and ^{241}Pu in the Earth's oceans, whereas nuclear weapons testing is responsible for only 6.5% and 16.5% of these isotopes, respectively.

== Sources of plutonium ==
=== Plutonium production ===
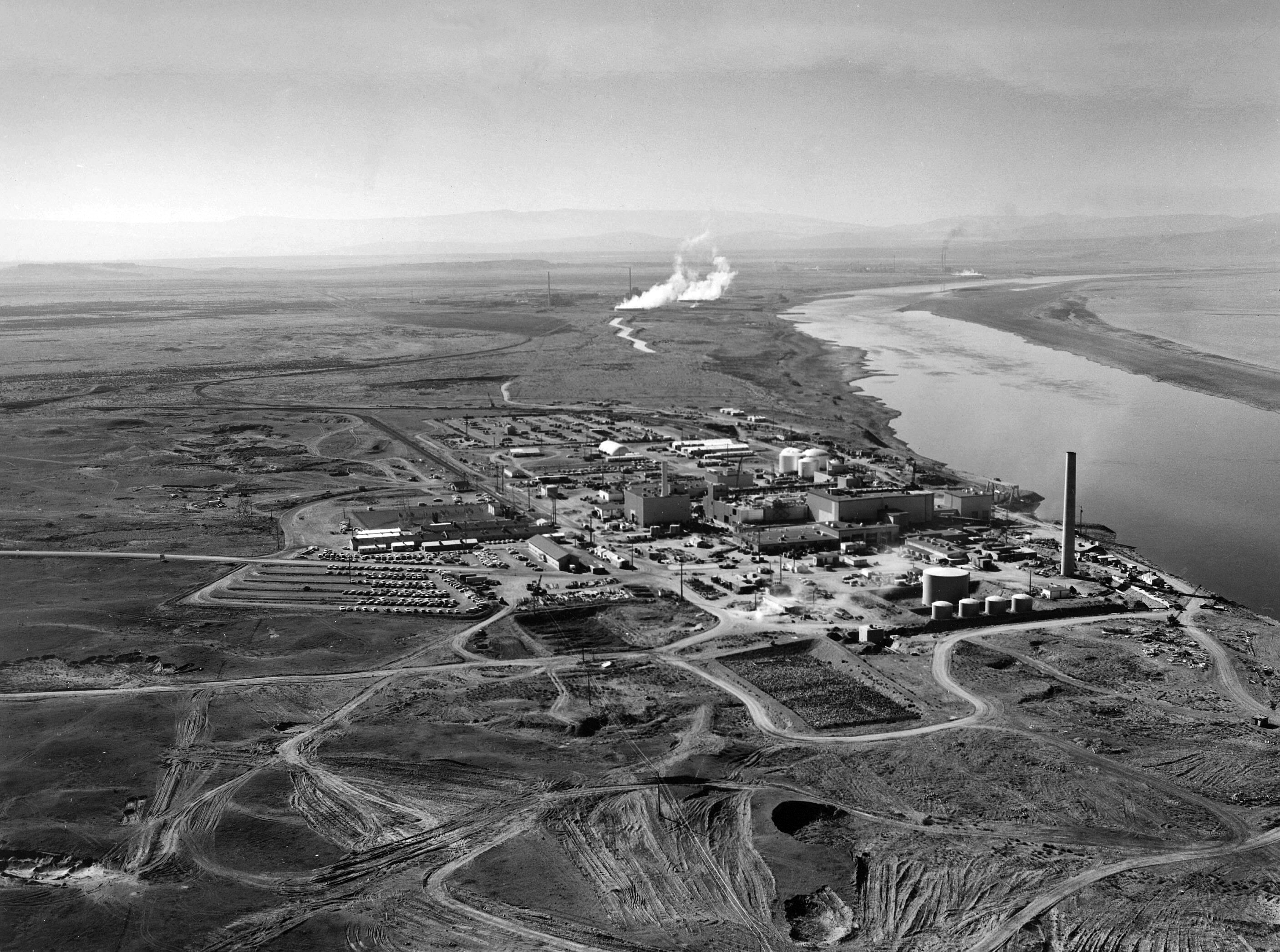
The Hanford site represents two-thirds of the nation's high-level radioactive waste by volume. Nuclear reactors line the riverbank at the Hanford Site along the Columbia River in January 1960.

Richland, Washington was the first city established to support plutonium production at the nearby Hanford nuclear site, to power the American nuclear weapons arsenals. Ozersk, Russia supported plutonium production to power the Soviet nuclear arsenals at the Mayak nuclear plant. These were the first two cities in the world to produce plutonium for use in cold war atomic bombs.

In the 2013 book, Plutopia: Nuclear Families, Atomic Cities, and the Great Soviet and American Plutonium Disasters, Kate Brown explores the health of affected citizens in both the United States and Russia, and the "slow-motion disasters" that still threaten the environments where the plants are located. According to Brown, the plants at Hanford and Mayak released over 200 million curies of radioactive isotopes into the surrounding environment over four decades, which is twice the amount expelled in the Chernobyl disaster in each instance.

Most of the radioactive contamination over the years from Hanford and Mayak were part of normal operations. Unforeseen accidents did occur, but plant management kept this secret, and the pollution continued unabated. Even today, as pollution threats to health and the environment persist, the government conceals information about the associated risks from the public.

=== Bomb detonations ===
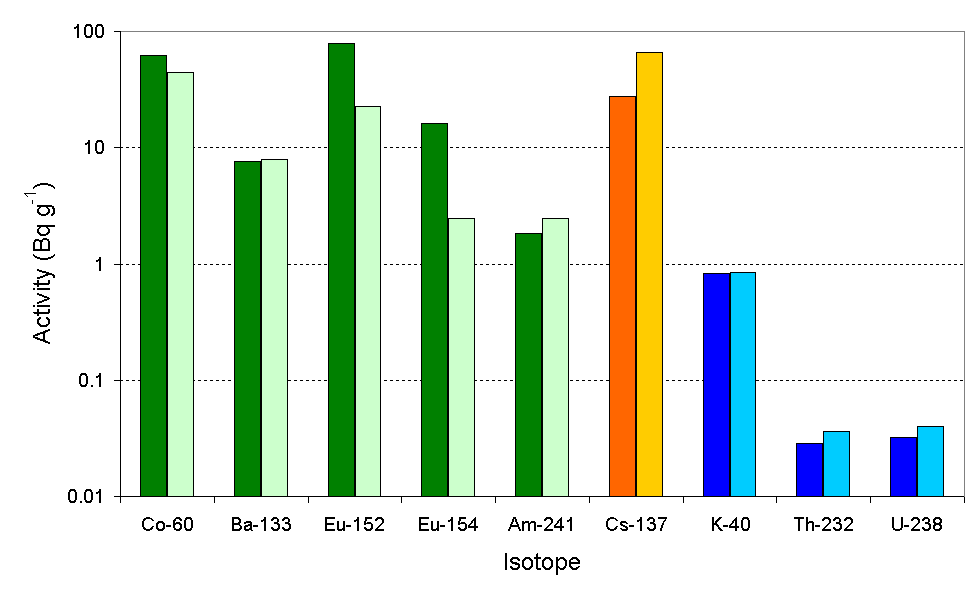
Levels of radioactivity in the trinitite glass from two different samples as measured by gamma spectroscopy on lumps of the glass. The americium content is the current content while all other isotopes have been back-calculated to shortly after the moment of detonation.

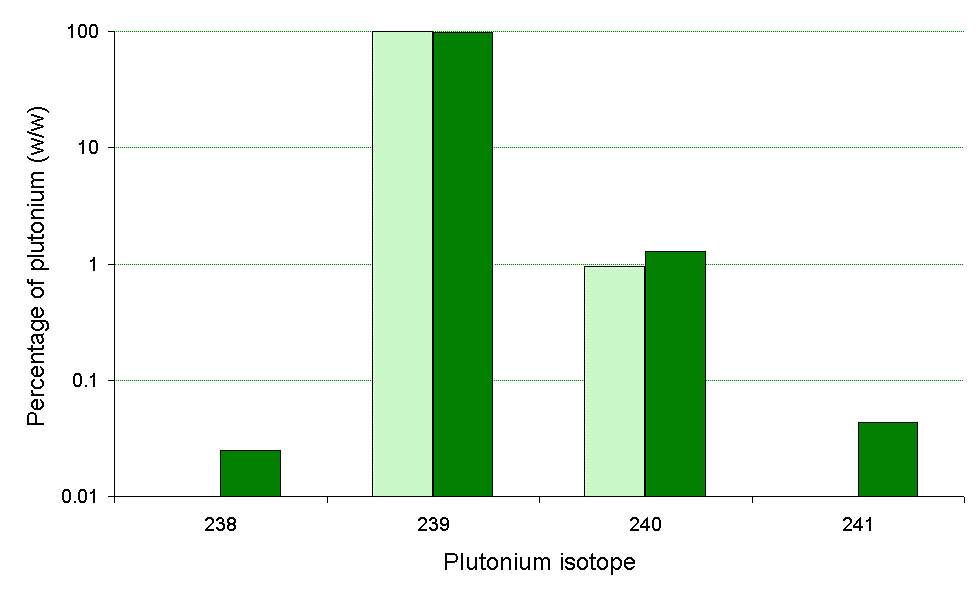
Isotopic signatures of the plutonium before and after the detonation.

About 3.5 tons of plutonium have been released into the environment by atomic bomb tests. While this might sound significant, it has only resulted in a very small dose to the majority of the humans on Earth. Overall the health effects of fission products are far greater than the effects of the actinides released by a nuclear bomb detonation. The plutonium from the fuel of the bomb is converted into a high-fired oxide that is carried high into the air. It slowly falls to earth as global fallout and is not soluble, and as a result it is difficult for this plutonium to be incorporated into an organism if ingested. Much of this plutonium is absorbed into sediments of lakes, rivers and oceans. However, about 66% of the plutonium from a bomb explosion is formed by the neutron capture of ^{238}U; this plutonium is not converted by the bomb into a high fired oxide, as it is formed more slowly. This formed plutonium is more soluble and more harmful as fallout.

Some plutonium can be deposited close to the point of detonation. The glassy trinitite formed by the Trinity bomb has been examined to determine what actinides and other radioisotopes it contained. A 2006 paper reports the levels of long lived radioisotopes in the trinitite. ^{152}Eu and ^{154}Eu was mainly formed by the neutron activation of the europium in the soil, and the level of radioactivity for these isotopes is highest where the neutron dose to the soil was larger. Some of the ^{60}Co was generated by activation of the cobalt in the soil, but some was also generated by the activation of the cobalt in the steel (100 foot) tower on which the bomb stood. This ^{60}Co from the tower would have been scattered over the site reducing the difference in the soil levels. ^{133}Ba and ^{241}Am were created by the neutron activation of barium and plutonium inside the bomb. The barium was present in the form of the nitrate in the chemical explosives used while the plutonium was the fissile fuel used.

As the ^{239}Pu/^{240}Pu ratio only changed slightly during the Trinity detonation, it has been commented that this isotope ratio for the majority of atomic bombs (in Japan the ^{239}Pu/^{240}Pu ratio in soil is normally in the range 0.17 to 0.19) is very different than from the bomb dropped upon Nagasaki.

=== Bomb safety trials ===
The two basic fission weapon designs.

Plutonium has also been released into the environment in safety trials. In these experiments, nuclear bombs have been subjected to simulated accidents or detonated with an abnormal initiation of their chemical explosives. An abnormal implosion will result in a compression of the plutonium pit, which is less uniform and smaller than the designed compression in the device. In these experiments where no or very little nuclear fission occurs, plutonium metal has been scattered around the test sites. While some of these tests have been done underground, other such tests were conducted in open air. A paper on the radioisotopes left on an island by the French nuclear bombs tests of the 20th century has been printed by the International Atomic Energy Agency and a section of this report deals with plutonium contamination resulting from such tests.

Other related trials were conducted at Maralinga, South Australia where both normal bomb detonations and "safety trials" have been conducted. While the activity from the fission products has decayed away almost totally (as of 2006) the plutonium remains active.

=== Space ===
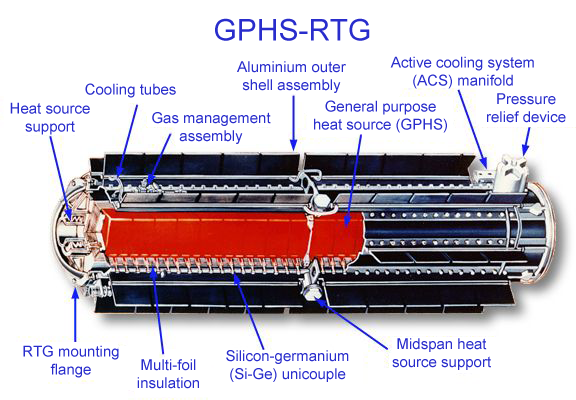
Diagram of an RTG used on the Cassini probe

Plutonium can also be introduced into the environment via the reentry of artificial satellites containing atomic batteries. There have been several such incidents, the most prominent being the Apollo 13 mission. The Apollo Lunar Surface Experiments Package carried on the Lunar Module re-entered the atmosphere over the South Pacific. Many atomic batteries have been of the Radioisotope thermoelectric generator (RTG) type. The Plutonium-238 used in RTGs has a half-life of 88 years, as opposed to the plutonium-239 used in nuclear weapons and reactors, which has a half-life of 24,100 years. In April 1964 a SNAP-9A failed to achieve orbit and disintegrated, dispersing roughly 1 kilogram (2.2 lb) of plutonium-238 over all continents. Most plutonium fell in the southern hemisphere. An estimated 6300 GBq or 2100 man-Sv of radiation was released and led to NASA's development of solar photovoltaic energy technology.

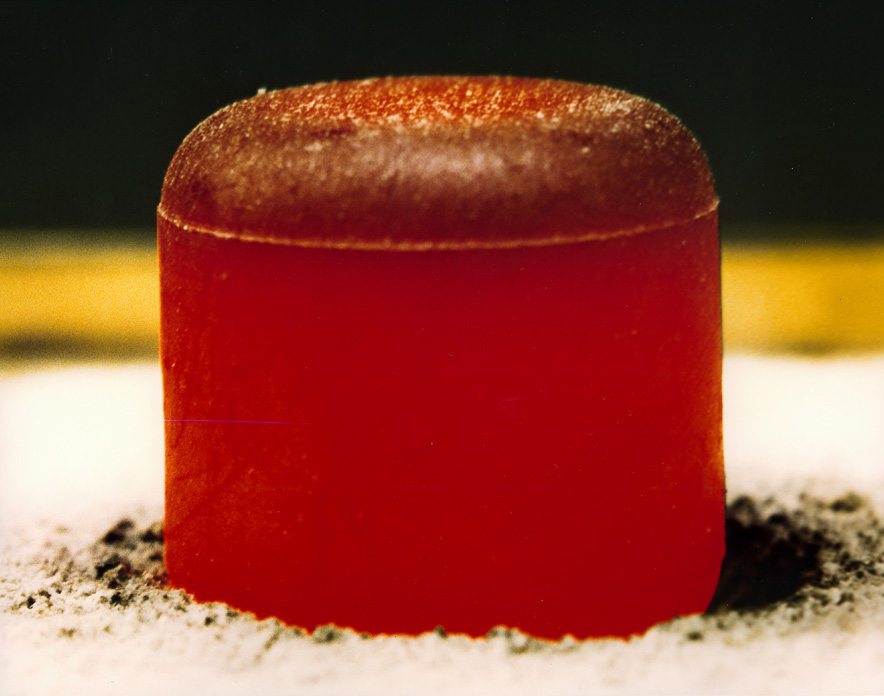
Image of (mostly) thermally isolated, RTG pellet glowing red hot because of incandescence.

Chain reactions do not occur inside RTGs, so a nuclear meltdown is impossible. In fact, some RTGs are designed so that fission does not occur at all; rather, forms of radioactive decay which cannot trigger other radioactive decays are used instead. As a result, the fuel in an RTG is consumed much more slowly and much less power is produced. RTGs are still a potential source of radioactive contamination: if the container holding the fuel leaks, the radioactive material will contaminate the environment. The main concern is that if an accident were to occur during launch or a subsequent passage of a spacecraft close to Earth, harmful material could be released into the atmosphere. However, this event is extremely unlikely with current RTG cask designs.

In order to decrease the risk of the radioactive material being released, the fuel is typically stored in individual modular units with their own heat shielding. They are surrounded by a layer of iridium metal and encased in high-strength graphite blocks. These two materials are corrosion and heat-resistant. Surrounding the graphite blocks is an aeroshell, designed to protect the entire assembly against the heat of reentering the Earth's atmosphere. The plutonium fuel is also stored in a ceramic form that is heat-resistant, decreasing the risk of vaporization and aerosolization. The ceramic is also highly insoluble.

The US Department of Energy has conducted seawater tests and determined that the graphite casing, which was designed to withstand reentry, is stable and no release of plutonium should occur. Subsequent investigations have found no increase in the natural background radiation in the area. The 1970 Apollo 13 crisis represents an extreme scenario due to the high re-entry velocities of the craft returning from cislunar space. This accident has served to validate the design of later-generation RTGs as highly safe.

=== Nuclear fuel cycle ===
Plutonium has been released into the environment in aqueous solution from nuclear reprocessing and uranium enrichment plants. The chemistry of this plutonium is different from that of the metal oxides formed from nuclear bomb detonations.

One example of a site where plutonium entered the soil is Rocky Flats where in the recent past XANES (X-ray spectroscopy) has been used to determine the chemical nature of the plutonium in the soil. The XANES was used to determine the oxidation state of the plutonium, while EXAFS was used to investigate the structure of the plutonium compound present in the soil and concrete.

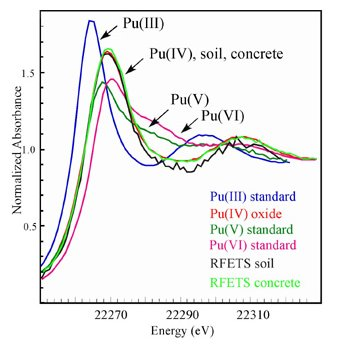
The XANES experiments done on plutonium in soil, concrete and standards of the different oxidation states.

=== Chernobyl ===
Because plutonium oxide is involatile, most of the plutonium in the reactor was not released during the fire. However that which was released can be measured. V.I. Yoschenko et al. reported that grass and forest fires can make the caesium, strontium and plutonium become mobile in the air again.

=== Fukushima ===
The ongoing crisis at this site includes Spent Fuel Pools on the upper floors, exposed to the elements with complex MOX and plutonium products. The Japanese Government Taskforce has asked for submissions to the International Research Institute for Nuclear Decommissioning in regards to the ongoing Contaminated Water Issues.

=== Nuclear crime ===
There have been 18 incidents concerning theft or loss of highly enriched uranium (HEU) and plutonium confirmed by the IAEA.

One case exists of a German man who attempted to poison his ex-wife with plutonium stolen from WAK (Wiederaufbereitungsanlage Karlsruhe), a small scale reprocessing plant where he worked. He did not steal a large amount of plutonium, just rags used for wiping surfaces and a small amount of liquid waste. The man was sent to prison for his crime. At least two other people were contaminated by the plutonium. Two flats in Rhineland-Palatinate were also contaminated. These were later cleaned at a cost of two million euros.

== Environmental chemistry ==
=== Overview ===
Plutonium, like other actinides, readily forms a dioxide plutonyl core (PuO_{2}). In the environment, this plutonyl core readily complexes with carbonate as well as other oxygen moieties (OH^{−}, NO_{2}^{−}, NO_{3}^{−}, and SO_{4}^{2−}) to form charged complexes which can be readily mobile with low affinities to soil.

- PuO_{2}(CO_{3})_{1}^{2−}
- PuO_{2}(CO_{3})_{2}^{4−}
- PuO_{2}(CO_{3})_{3}^{6−}

PuO_{2} formed from neutralizing highly acidic nitric acid solutions tends to form polymeric PuO_{2} which is resistant to complexation. Plutonium also readily shifts valences between the +3, +4, +5 and +6 states. It is common for some fraction of plutonium in solution to exist in all of these states in equilibrium.

=== Binding to soil ===
Plutonium is known to bind to soil particles very strongly (see above for an X-ray spectroscopic study of plutonium in soil and concrete). While caesium has very different chemistry to the actinides, it is well known that both caesium and many of the actinides bind strongly to the minerals in soil. Hence it has been possible to use ^{134}Cs labeled soil to study the migration of Pu and Cs in soils. It has been shown that colloidal transport processes control the migration of Cs (and will control the migration of Pu) in the soil at the Waste Isolation Pilot Plant according to R.D. Whicker and S.A. Ibrahim. J.D. Chaplin et al. recently reported advances in the Diffusive gradients in thin films technique, which have provided a method to measure labile bioavailable Plutonium in soils, as well as in freshwater and seawater.

=== Microbiological chemistry ===
Mary Neu (at Los Alamos in the USA) has done some work which suggests that bacteria can accumulate plutonium because the iron transport systems used by the bacteria also function as plutonium transport systems.

== Biology ==
Plutonium ingested by or injected into humans is transported in the transferrin based iron(III) transport system and then is stored in the liver in the iron store (ferritin), after an exposure to plutonium it is important to rapidly inject the subject with a chelating agent such as calcium complex of DTPA. This antidote is useful for a single exposure such as that which would occur if a glove box worker were to cut his or her hand with a plutonium-contaminated object. The calcium complex has faster metal binding kinetics than the zinc complex but if the calcium complex is used for a long time it tends to remove important minerals from the person. The zinc complex is less able to cause these effects.

Plutonium that is inhaled by humans lodges in the lungs and is slowly translocated to the lymph nodes. Inhaled plutonium has been shown to lead to lung cancer in experimental animals.

== See also ==
- Actinides in the environment
