= Alison Isenberg =

American historian (1962–2025)

- Born: June 16, 1962; West Hartford, Connecticut, U.S.
- Died: October 23, 2025 (aged 63); Princeton, New Jersey, U.S.
- Occupations: Historian, college professor
- Spouse: Keith Wailoo

Alison Ellen Isenberg (June 16, 1962 – October 23, 2025) was an American historian, and a professor of history at Princeton University. She received the Ellis W. Hawley Prize in 2005 for her book Downtown America: A History of the Place and the People Who Made It.

== Early life and education ==
Isenberg was born in West Hartford, Connecticut, the daughter of Leon E. Isenberg and Marian Ellenbogen Isenberg. Her father was a businessman and her mother was an architect. She graduated from the Loomis Chaffee School in 1980, earned a bachelor's degree from Yale University in 1984, and completed doctoral work in 1995, at the University of Pennsylvania.

== Career ==
After college and before graduate school, Isenberg worked as a planner with the New York City Parks Department and in the South Bronx with the Community Preservation Corporation. She taught at Florida International University from 1994 to 1997, at the University of North Carolina from 1997 to 2001, and at Rutgers University from 2001 to 2010.

Isenberg joined the Princeton University faculty in 2010. In 2013 she was founding co-director of the Princeton-Mellon Initiative in Architecture, Urbanism and the Humanities. She was director of the urban studies program at Princeton in 2013 and 2014. She was president of the Society for American City and Regional Planning History (SACRPH), and won that organization's Lewis Mumford Prze for her first book, Downtown America (2004). She served on the board of the Urban History Association and was reviews editor of the Journal of Planning History.

At the time of her death in 2025, Isenberg was finishing a book on civil unrest in Trenton, New Jersey, in 1968. She worked with the Trenton Project and arranged for Yale University Library to acquire the photo archives of The Trenton Times when it ceased publication in 2025.

== Publications ==
- Downtown America: A History of the Place and the People Who Made It (University of Chicago Press, 2004) ISBN 9780226385082
- Designing San Francisco: Art, Land, and Urban Renewal in the City by the Bay (Princeton University Press, 2017) ISBN 9781400888832

== Personal life ==
Isenberg was married to fellow historian Keith Wailoo; they had two daughters. She died in 2025, at the age of 63, in Princeton, New Jersey.
