= Ellis W. Hawley Prize =

The Ellis W. Hawley Prize is an annual book award by the Organization of American Historians for the best historical study of the political economy, politics, or institutions of the United States, in its domestic or international affairs, from the American Civil War to the present. The prize honors Ellis W. Hawley, Emeritus Professor of History, University of Iowa, for his outstanding work in these subjects The Ellis W. Hawley Prize was first approved at the annual business meeting of the Organization of American Historians on April 1, 1995, and first awarded in 1997. The awarding committee is composed of three members appointed annually by the President of the Organization of American Historians. The winner receives five hundred dollars.

Year	Winner	Affiliation	Title
1997	Gareth Davies	Oxford University (UK)	From Opportunity to Entitlement: The Transformation and Decline of Great Society Liberalism
1998	Walter LaFeber	Cornell University	The Clash: A History of U.S.–Japan Relations
1999	Daniel T. Rodgers	Princeton University	Atlantic Crossings: Social Politics in a Progressive Age
2000	Julian E. Zelizer	State University of New York at Albany	Taxing America: Wilbur Mills, Congress, and the State, 1945–1975
2001	Stephen Kantrowitz	University of Wisconsin–Madison	Ben Tillman and the Reconstruction of White America
2002	David W. Blight	Amherst College	Race and Reunion: The Civil War in American Memory
2003	Steven W. Usselman	Georgia Institute of Technology	Regulating Railroad Innovation: Business, Technology, and Politics in America, 1840–1920
2004	Jennifer Klein	Yale University	For All These Rights: Business, Labor, and the Shaping of America's Public-Private Welfare State
2005	Alison Isenberg	Rutgers University	Downtown America: A History of the Place and the People Who Made It
2006	Meg Jacobs	Massachusetts Institute of Technology	Pocketbook Politics: Economic Citizenship in Twentieth-Century America
2007	Marie Gottschalk	University of Pennsylvania	The Prison and the Gallows: The Politics of Mass Incarceration in America
2008co	Wendy L. Wall	Colgate University	Inventing the "American Way": The Politics of Consensus from the New Deal to the Civil Rights Movement
2008co	David M. P. Freund	University of Maryland, College Park	Colored Property: State Policy and White Racial Politics in Suburban America
2009	Peggy Pascoe	University of Oregon	What Comes Naturally: Miscegenation Law and the Making of Race in America
2010	Margot Canaday	Princeton University	The Straight State: Sexuality and Citizenship in Twentieth-Century America
2011	Nick Cullather	Indiana University	The Hungry World: America’s Cold War Battle Against Poverty in Asia
2012	Darren Dochuk	Purdue University	From Bible Belt to Sunbelt: Plain-Folk Religion, Grassroots Politics, and the Rise of Evangelical Conservatism
2013	Jonathan Levy	Princeton University	Freaks of Fortune: The Emerging World of Capitalism and Risk in America
2014	Kate Brown	University of Maryland, Baltimore County	Plutopia: Nuclear Families, Atomic Cities, and the Great Soviet and American Plutonium Disasters
2015	Alan McPherson	University of Oklahoma	The Invaded: How Latin Americans and Their Allies Fought and Ended U.S. Occupations
2016	Gary Gerstle	University of Cambridge	Liberty and Coercion: The Paradox of American Government from the Founding to the Present
2017	Sam Lebovic	George Mason University	Free Speech and Unfree News: The Paradox of Press Freedom in America
2018	Richard White	Stanford University	The Republic for Which It Stands
2019	Elizabeth Lew-Williams	Princeton University	The Chinese Must Go: Violence, Exclusion, and the Making of the Alien in America
2020	Keeanga-Yamahtta Taylor	Princeton University	Race for Profit: How Banks and the Real Estate Industry Undermined Black Home Ownership
2021	Lila Corwin Berman	Temple University	The American Jewish Philanthropic Complex: The History of a Multibillion-Dollar Institution
2022	Destin Jenkins	Stanford University	The Bonds of Inequality: Debt and the Making of the American City
2024	Dylan C. Penningroth	University of California, Berkeley	Before the Movement: The Hidden History of Black Civil Rights
2025	Brianna Nofil	College of William & Mary	The Migrant’s Jail: An American History of Mass Incarceration
2026	Brendan A. Shanahan,	Yale University	Disparate Regimes: Nativist Politics, Alienage Law, and Citizenship Rights in the United States, 1865–1965

== See also ==
- List of history awards
