= Actinide chemistry =

Branch of nuclear chemistry

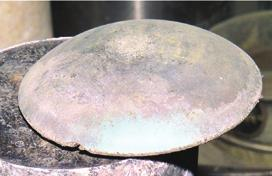
Plutonium is a transuranic radioactive chemical element, an actinide metal.

Actinide chemistry (or actinoid chemistry) is one of the main branches of nuclear chemistry that investigates the processes and molecular systems of the actinides. The actinides derive their name from the group 3 element actinium. The informal chemical symbol An is used in general discussions of actinide chemistry to refer to any actinide. All but one of the actinides are f-block elements, corresponding to the filling of the 5f electron shell; lawrencium, a d-block element, is also generally considered an actinide. In comparison with the lanthanides, also mostly f-block elements, the actinides show much more variable valence. The actinide series encompasses the 15 metallic chemical elements with atomic numbers from 89 to 103, actinium through lawrencium.

== Main branches ==
=== Organoactinide chemistry ===
In contrast to the relatively early flowering of organotransition-metal chemistry (1955 to the present), the corresponding development of actinide organometallic chemistry has taken place largely within the past 15 or so years. During this period, 5f organometallic science has blossomed, and it is now apparent that the actinides have a rich, intricate, and highly informative organometallic chemistry. Intriguing parallels to and sharp differences from the d-block elements have emerged. Actinides can coordinate the organic active groups or bind to carbon by the covalent bonds.

=== Thermodynamics of actinides ===
The necessity of obtaining accurate thermodynamic quantities for the actinide elements and their compounds was recognized at the outset of the Manhattan Project, when a dedicated team of scientists and engineers initiated the program to exploit nuclear energy for military purposes. Since the end of World War II, both fundamental and applied objectives have motivated a great deal of further study of actinide thermodynamics.

=== Nanotechnology and supramolecular chemistry of actinides ===
The possibility of using unique properties of lanthanides in the nanotechnology is demonstrated. The origination of linear and nonlinear optical properties of lanthanide compounds with phthalocyanines, porphyrins, naphthalocyanines, and their analogs in solutions and condensed state and the prospects of obtaining novel materials on their basis are discussed. Based on the electronic structure and properties of lanthanides and their compounds, namely, optical and magnetic characteristics, electronic and ionic conductivity, and fluctuating valence, molecular engines are classified. High-speed storage engines or memory storage engines; photoconversion molecular engines based on Ln(II) and Ln(III); electrochemical molecular engines involving silicate and phosphate glasses; molecular engines whose operation is based on insulator – semiconductor, semiconductor – metal, and metal – superconductor types of conductivity phase transitions; solid electrolyte molecular engines; and miniaturized molecular engines for medical analysis are distinguished. It is shown that thermodynamically stable nanoparticles of Ln_{x}M_{y} composition can be formed by d elements of the second halves of the series, i.e., those arranged after M = Mn, Tc, and Re.

=== Biological and environmental chemistry of actinides ===
Generally, ingested insoluble actinide compounds such as high-fired uranium dioxide and mixed oxide (MOX) fuel will pass through the digestive system with little effect since they cannot dissolve and be absorbed by the body. Inhaled actinide compounds, however, will be more damaging as they remain in the lungs and irradiate the lung tissue. Ingested Low-fired oxides and soluble salts such as nitrate can be absorbed into the blood stream. If they are inhaled then it is possible for the solid to dissolve and leave the lungs. Hence the dose to the lungs will be lower for the soluble form.

Radon and radium are not actinides—they are both radioactive daughters from the decay of uranium. Aspects of their biology and environmental behaviour is discussed at radium in the environment.

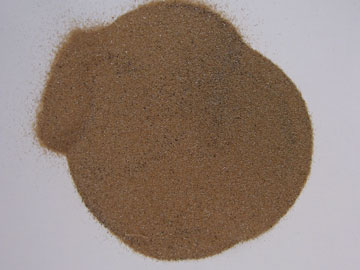
Monazite, a rare earth and thorium phosphate mineral, is the primary source of the world's thorium.

In India, a large amount of thorium ore can be found in the form of monazite in placer deposits of the Western and Eastern coastal dune sands, particularly in the Tamil Nadu coastal areas. The residents of this area are exposed to a naturally occurring radiation dose ten times higher than the worldwide average.

Thorium has been linked to liver cancer. In the past thoria (thorium dioxide) was used as a contrast agent for medical X-ray radiography but its use has been discontinued. It was sold under the name Thorotrast.

Uranium is about as abundant as arsenic or molybdenum. Significant concentrations of uranium occur in some substances such as phosphate rock deposits, and minerals such as lignite, and monazite sands in uranium-rich ores (it is recovered commercially from these sources). Seawater contains about 3.3 parts per billion of uranium by weight as uranium(VI) forms soluble carbonate complexes. The extraction of uranium from seawater has been considered as a means of obtaining the element. Because of the very low specific activity of uranium the chemical effects of it upon living things can often outweigh the effects of its radioactivity.

Plutonium, like other actinides, readily forms a plutonium dioxide (plutonyl) core (PuO_{2}). In the environment, this plutonyl core readily complexes with carbonate as well as other oxygen moieties (OH^{−}, NO^{−}_{2}, NO^{−}_{3}, and SO^{2−}_{4}) to form charged complexes which can be readily mobile with low affinities to soil.

== Nuclear reactions ==
Some early evidence for nuclear fission was the formation of a short-lived radioisotope of barium which was isolated from neutron irradiated uranium (^{139}Ba, with a half-life of 83 minutes and ^{140}Ba, with a half-life of 12.8 days, are major fission products of uranium). At the time, it was thought that this was a new radium isotope, as it was then standard radiochemical practice to use a barium sulfate carrier precipitate to assist in the isolation of radium.

== PUREX ==
The PUREX process is a liquid–liquid extraction ion-exchange method used to reprocess spent nuclear fuel, in order to extract primarily uranium and plutonium, independent of each other, from the other constituents. The current method of choice is to use the PUREX liquid–liquid extraction process which uses a tributyl phosphate/hydrocarbon mixture to extract both uranium and plutonium from nitric acid. This extraction is of the nitrate salts and is classed as being of a solvation mechanism. For example, the extraction of plutonium by an extraction agent (S) in a nitrate medium occurs by the following reaction.

Pu^{4+}_{(aq)} + 4 NO^{−}_{3}_{(aq)} + 2 S_{(organic)} → [Pu(NO_{3})_{4}S_{2}]_{(organic)}

A complex bond is formed between the metal cation, the nitrates and the tributyl phosphate, and a model compound of a dioxouranium(VI) complex with two nitrates and two triethyl phosphates has been characterised by X-ray crystallography. After the dissolution step it is normal to remove the fine insoluble solids, because otherwise they will disturb the solvent extraction process by altering the liquid-liquid interface. It is known that the presence of a fine solid can stabilize an emulsion. Emulsions are often referred to as third phases in the solvent extraction community.

An organic solvent composed of 30% tributyl phosphate (TBP) in a hydrocarbon solvent, such as kerosene, is used to extract the uranium as UO_{2}(NO_{3})_{2}·2TBP complexes, and plutonium as similar complexes, from other fission products, which remain in the aqueous phase. The transuranium elements americium and curium also remain in the aqueous phase. The nature of the organic soluble uranium complex has been the subject of some research. A series of complexes of uranium with nitrate and trialkyl phosphates and phosphine oxides have been characterized.

Plutonium is separated from uranium by treating the kerosene solution with aqueous ferrous sulphamate, which selectively reduces the plutonium to the +3 oxidation state. The plutonium passes into the aqueous phase. The uranium is stripped from the kerosene solution by back-extraction into nitric acid at a concentration of ca. 0.2 mol dm^{−3}.

== See also ==
- Nuclear chemistry
- Actinides in the environment
- Important publications in nuclear chemistry
