= Americanism (ideology) =

Patriotic ideology in the United States

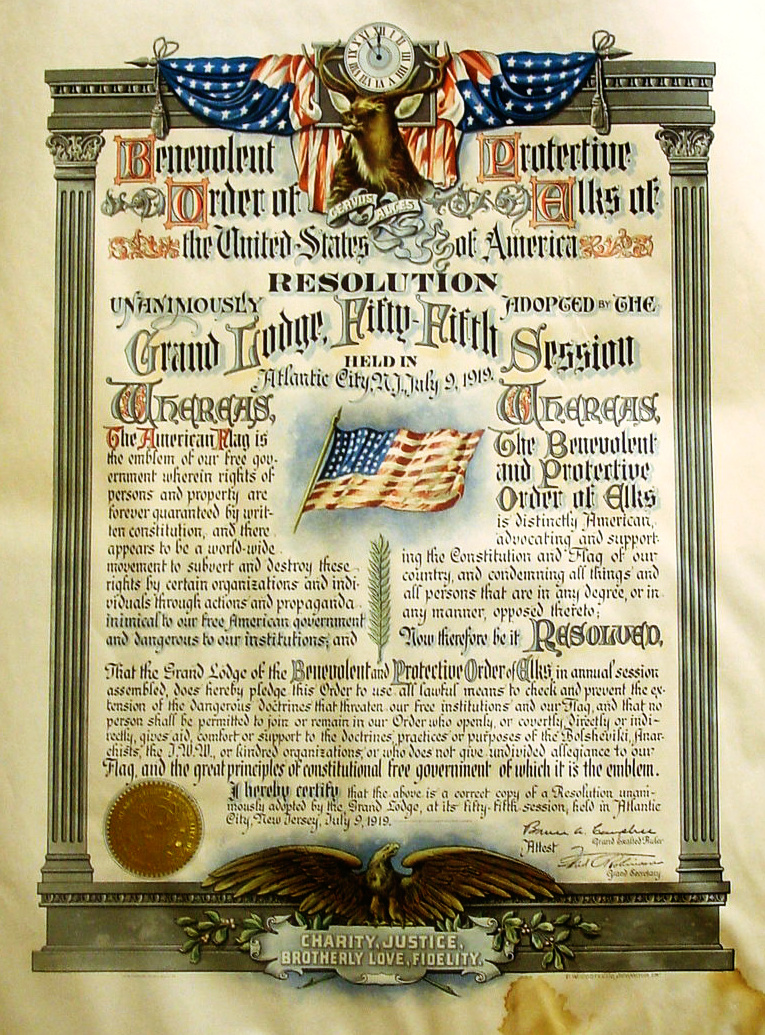
Flags Day Resolution of 1919.

Americanism is a set of national values which together create a shared identity of the United States and its allies that has been defined as "an articulation of the nation's rightful place in the world, a set of traditions, a political language, and a cultural style imbued with political meaning". The concept is "famously contested" and there is no consensus on "which is the true or authentic... exposition of Americanism... because each of these texts ... is informed by different interpretations of the nature, purpose, and goals of Americanism."

Americanism is not merely nationalism and can carry two different meanings: the defining characteristics of the United States, or loyalty to the United States and defense of American political ideals. These ideals include but are not limited to independence, equality before the law, freedom of speech, democracy, and progress.

For example, according to the American Legion, Americanism is an ideology, or a belief in devotion, loyalty, or allegiance to the United States, or respect for its flag, its traditions, its customs, its culture, symbols, its institutions, or its form of government.

Theodore Roosevelt wrote that "Americanism is a question of spirit, conviction, and purpose, not of creed or birthplace."

Though once used in sneering context by British monarchy loyalists in 1779 to describe the American revolutionary spirit, Thomas Jefferson used it with appreciation in a letter in 1808, stating to the recipient ". . . that you ever participated in any plan for a division of the Union, I never for one moment believed. I knew your Americanism too well."

== Ideology ==
According to Wendy L. Wall in her 2008 book Inventing the "American Way": The Politics of Consensus from the New Deal to the Civil Rights Movement, Americanism was presented by a national propaganda campaign to contrast with Communism, and Fascism, during the Cold War, with the benefits of Americanism being promoted through the ideals of freedom and democracy.

Professor of political science at Clemson University C. Bradley Thompson stated that

The meaning of Americanism today, however, is very different. To the extent that the term is even still used, its meaning has been hijacked by both the Left and the Right. The Left most often identifies Americanism with multiculturalism, relativism, environmentalism, regulation, and welfarism — in other words, with progressivism. The Right typically identifies Americanism with Christianity, school prayer, tradition, family values, and community standards—in other words, with social conservatism. None of these values are, however, uniquely American. In fact, in one form or another, they all have a distinctly European provenance that is set in direct opposition to the native meaning of Americanism.

Some organizations have claimed to embrace Americanism, but have taken positions contrary to the general trend of the founding era and its documents codify enforcement of white supremacist ideology: For example, the Ku Klux Klan officially adopted the American Legion's goal of Americanism ensuring (purity of white American) and of American Protestantism.

In a 1916 essay devoted to Americanism, Agnes Repplier emphasized that, "Of all the countries in the world, we and we only have any need to create artificially the patriotism which is the birthright of other nations."

== History ==
The concept of Americanism has been in use since the first European settlers moved to North America inspired by a vision of a shining "City upon a Hill". John Adams wrote that the new settlements in America were "the opening of a grand scene and design in Providence for the illumination of the ignorant, and the emancipation of the slavish part of mankind all over the earth".

During the antebellum period, throughout the 1830s, 1840s, and 1850s, Americanism acquired a restrictive political meaning due to nativist moral panics after increased Irish and German immigration led to the growth of American Catholicism.

Journalist Matthew Continetti describes U.S. presidents Warren G. Harding and Calvin Coolidge as "spokesmen for Americanism" based on their policies. The John Birch Society and its founder, Robert Welch, promoted Americanism as "the philosophical antithesis of communism." Conversely, during the Great Depression and afterwards, the Communist Party campaigned that "Communism is the Americanism of the 20th Century."

The years from the end of the Civil War to the end of World War II brought new meaning to the term "Americanism" to millions of immigrants coming from Europe and Asia. Those were times of great economic growth and industrialization, and thus brought forth the American scene consisting of "industrial democracy" and the thinking that the people are the government in America. Since then, the success of the American nation has brought tremendous power to the notion of Americanism.

Historian Phillip Davis, compiled Immigration and Americanization in 1920 as a historical anthology, writing about "True Americanism" that:

To become Americanized the change wrought must be fundamental. However great his outward conformity, the immigrant is not Americanized unless his interests and affections have become deeply rooted here. And we properly demand of the immigrant even more than this. He must be brought into complete harmony with our ideals and aspirations and cooperate with us for their attainment. Only when this has been done will he possess the national consciousness of an American. I say "He must be brought into complete harmony." But let us not forget that many a poor immigrant comes to us from distant lands, ignorant of our language, strange in tattered clothes and with jarring manners, who is already truly American in this most important sense ; who has long shared our ideals and who, oppressed and persecuted abroad, has yearned for our land of liberty and for the opportunity of aiding in the realization of its aims.

== Ideas ==
=== Government ===
Rather than collectivism, Americanism stresses unity based on the shared individualist liberal principles outlined in the Constitution of the United States by the Founding Fathers. Such ideology includes republicanism, freedom, liberty, individualism, constitutionalism, human rights, and the rule of law.

=== Culture ===
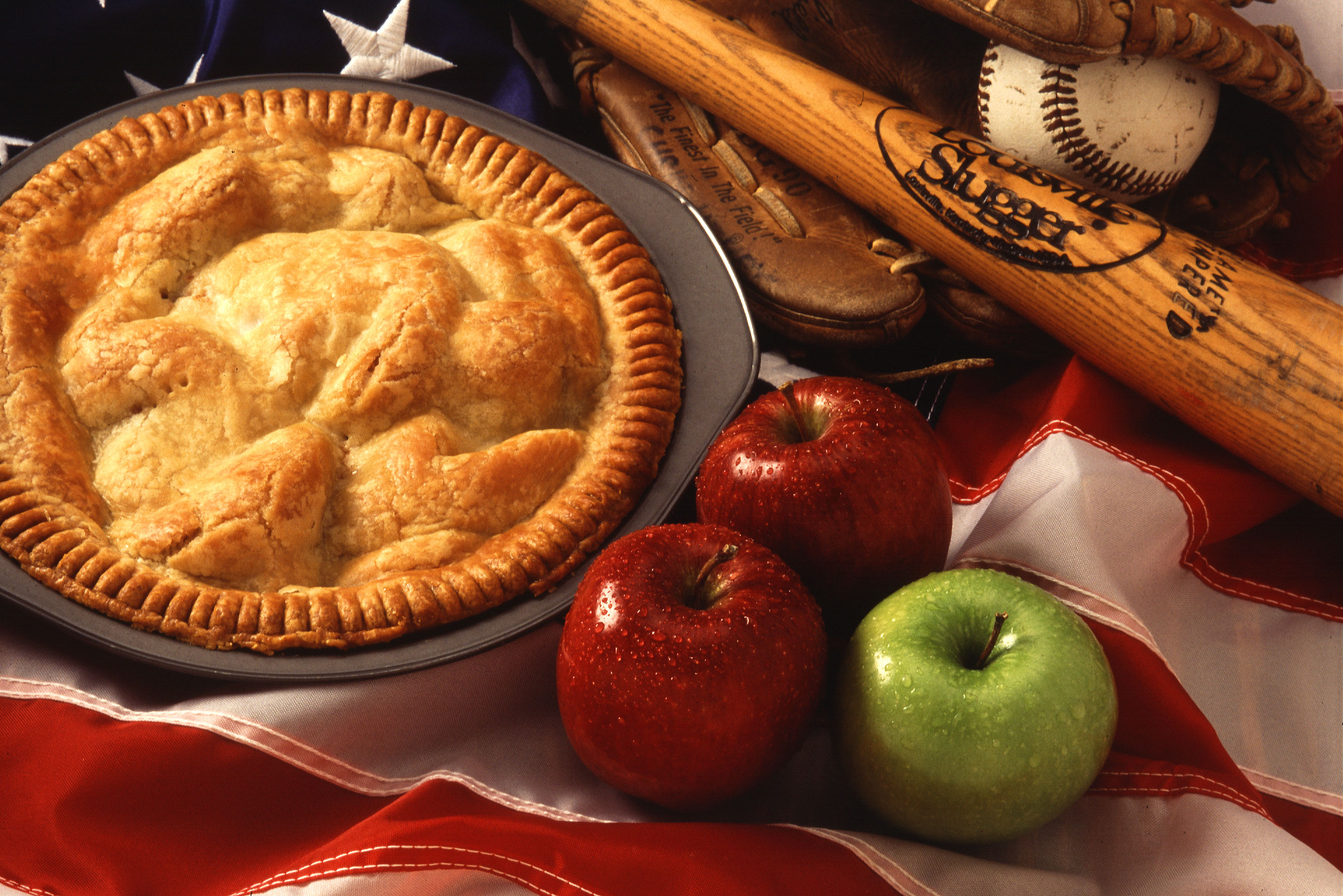
Cultural icons for the United States: the American flag, baseball, apples and apple pie

Proponents of Americanism espouse an identity based on aspects of traditional culture of the United States. Common cultural artifacts include the flag of the United States, apple pie, baseball, rock and roll, blue jeans, Coca-Cola, and small towns. Americanism tends to support monoculturalism and cultural assimilation, believing them to be integral to a unified American cultural identity.

=== Symbols ===
Americanism attempts to collect a set of common icons to symbolize the American identity. Well known national symbols of the United States include the U.S. flag, the Great Seal, the bald eagle, The Star-Spangled Banner, In God We Trust, and the Pledge of Allegiance.

== See also ==
- American civil religion
- American Creed
- American exceptionalism
- American nationalism
- Anti-Americanism
- Propaganda in the United States
