= Guillaumont =

Guillaumont is a French surname. Notable people with the surname include:

- Antoine Guillaumont (1915–2000), French archaeologist
- Robert Guillaumont (born 1933), French chemist

== See also ==
- Charles-Axel Guillaumot (1730–1807), French architect
