= Myth America =

2023 American history book

Myth America: Historians Take On the Biggest Legends and Lies About Our Past
- Editor: Kevin M. Kruse and Julian E. Zelizer
- Subject: American history
- Publisher: Basic Books
- Publication date: 2023
- ISBN: 978-1541601390

Myth America: Historians Take On the Biggest Legends and Lies About Our Past is a book of essays by 20 leading historians and other academics debunking popular beliefs regarding events in American history, as well as more contemporary issues. The book was published by Basic Books in early 2023.

Edited by Kevin M. Kruse and Julian E. Zelizer, historians at Princeton University, the book focuses on more recent research challenging narratives promoted by conservative sources on subjects such as America's founding in the late 18th century, the South's rebellion during the 1860s, the New Deal of the 1930s, the Civil Rights Movement in the 1950s and 1960s, the Reagan "revolution" of the 1980s, and charges of voter fraud during the early 2020s. Its essays also cover a range of social and political issues, including immigration, feminism, capitalism, American socialism, and police violence.

== Contents ==
Myth America opens with an introduction by the book's editors Kevin Kruse and Julian E. Zelizer and includes the following essays by recognized authorities on American history:

1. American Exceptionalism — David A. Bell
2. Founding Myths — Akhil Reed Amar
3. Vanishing Indians — Ari Kelman
4. Immigration — Erika Lee
5. America First — Sarah Churchwell
6. The United States Is an Empire — Daniel Immerwahr
7. The Border — Geraldo Cadava
8. American Socialism — Michael Kazin
9. The Magic of the Marketplace — Naomi Oreskes and Erik M. Conway
10. The New Deal — Eric Rauchway
11. Confederate Monuments — Karen L. Cox
12. The Southern Strategy — Kevin Kruse
13. The Good Protest — Glenda Gilmore
14. White Backlash — Lawrence B. Glickman
15. The Great Society — Joshua Zeitz
16. Police Violence — Elizabeth Hinton
17. Insurrection — Kathleen Belew
18. Family Values Feminism — Natalia Mehlman Petrzela
19. Reagan Revolution — Julian E. Zelizer
20. Voter Fraud — Carol Anderson
