= Tiny Gardens Everywhere =

2026 non-fiction book by Kate Brown

Tiny Gardens Everywhere: The Past, Present and Future of the Self-Provisioning City is a 2026 book by Kate Brown which explores the history of urban gardening around the world.
