= Kate Brown (historian) =

Historian of Science and the Cold War

- Brown at Boston Book Festival in 2026
- Born: September 24, 1965 (age 61)

Academic work
- Discipline: History of Science
- Institutions: Massachusetts Institute of Technology

Kate Brown (born September 24, 1965) is a Professor in History of Science at the Massachusetts Institute of Technology. She is the author of Manual for Survival: A Chernobyl Guide to the Future (2019), Dispatches from Dystopia (2015), Plutopia (2013), and A Biography of No Place (2004). She was a member of the faculty at the University of Maryland, Baltimore County from 2000 to 2018. She is the founding consulting editor of History Unclassified in The American Historical Review.

Her Manual for Survival (2019), a ground-level study of the impact of the Chernobyl nuclear disaster, was a finalist for the National Book Critics Circle Award in nonfiction and was described by The Economist as “a magisterial blend of historical research, investigative journalism, and poetic reportage.” She is the only historian ever to receive the United States’ highest scholarly prizes in Russian studies, U.S. history, Western history, environmental history, and the history of the Americas all for the same work, Plutopia, a comparative study of nuclear production and social transformation in the Cold War United States and the Soviet Union. Brown is currently working on a global history and future of urban farming.

Brown has been the recipient of many honors for her work. These include a Guggenheim Fellowship, a Carnegie Fellowship, and a Berlin Prize Fellowship. Her A Biography of No Place (2004), a study of community and identity in eastern Europe's forgotten borderlands, received the George Louis Beer Prize of the American Historical Association (AHA), given for outstanding writing in European international history. Plutopia received three of the highest awards in American history: the AHA's Albert J. Beveridge and John H. Dunning awards and the Ellis W. Hawley Prize of the Organization of American Historians. The American Society of Environmental History awarded Plutopia the George Perkins Marsh Prize. In addition to these awards, Plutopia was honored with the principal award in Russian/Eurasian studies, as winner of the Wayne S. Vucinich Prize of the Association for Slavic, East European, and Eurasian Studies (ASEEES) for the most important work in that field in any discipline. Manual for Survival also received multiple scholarly awards, including the Reginald Zelnik Prize in Russian/Eurasian history and the Marshal D. Shulman Prize in foreign policy, both given by ASEEES. Brown's research has been supported by the National Endowment for the Humanities, the U.S. Holocaust Memorial Museum, the European University Institute, the American Council of Learned Societies, and other leading academic institutions.

== Biography of No Place: From Ethnic Borderland to Soviet Heartland ==
This is a biography of a borderland between Russia and Poland, a region where, in 1925, people identified as Poles, Germans, Jews, Ukrainians, and Russians lived side by side. Over the next three decades, this mosaic of cultures was modernized and homogenized out of existence by the ruling might of the Soviet Union, then Nazi Germany, and finally, Polish and Ukrainian nationalism. By the 1950s, this “no place” emerged as a Ukrainian heartland, and the fertile mix of peoples that defined the region was destroyed.

== Dispatches from Dystopia: A History of Places Not Yet Forgotten. ==
This collection of essays narrates the histories of locales that have been silenced, broken, or contaminated. In telling these previously unknown stories, Brown examines the making and unmaking of place, and the lives of the people who remain in the fragile landscapes that are left behind. The Atlantic elected Dispatches as one of the Best Books We Read in 2016.

== Plutopia ==
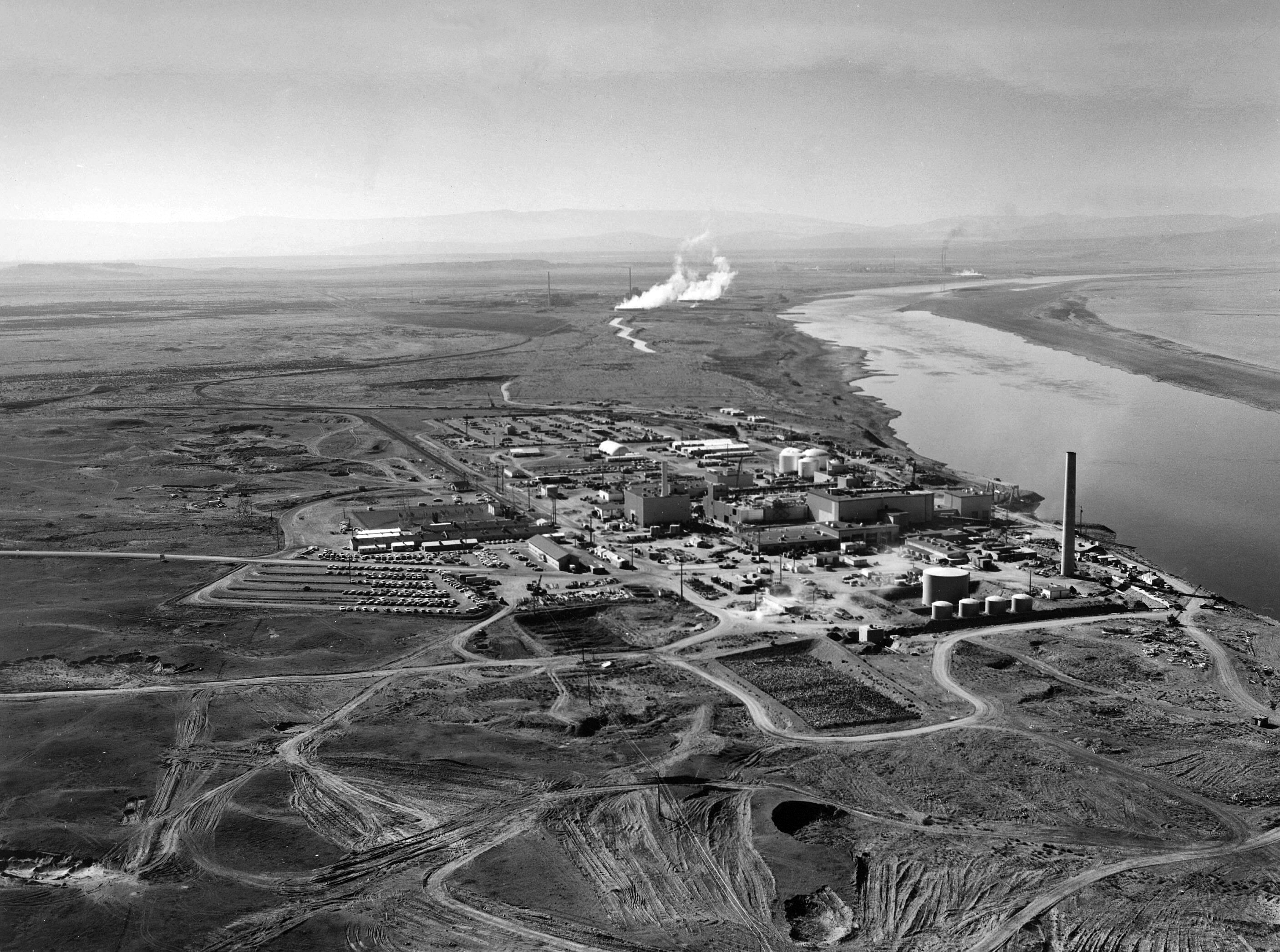
The Hanford site represents two-thirds of the nation's high-level radioactive waste by volume. Nuclear reactors line the riverbank at the Hanford Site along the Columbia River in January 1960.

Richland, Washington, was the first city established to support plutonium production at the nearby Hanford nuclear site, to power the American nuclear weapons arsenals. Ozersk, Russia, supported plutonium production to power the Soviet nuclear arsenals at the Mayak nuclear plant. These were the first two cities in the world to produce plutonium for use in Cold War atomic bombs.

In the 2013 book on a history of these two cities, Plutopia: Nuclear Families, Atomic Cities, and the Great Soviet and American Plutonium Disasters, Kate Brown explores the health of affected citizens in both the United States and Russia, and the "slow-motion disasters" that still threaten the environments where the plants are located. According to Brown, the plants at Hanford and Mayak, over a period of four decades, "both released more than 200 million curies of radioactive isotopes into the surrounding environment -- twice the amount expelled in the Chernobyl disaster in each instance."

Brown says that most of this radioactive contamination over the years at Hanford and Mayak were part of normal operations, but unforeseen accidents did occur and plant management kept this secret, as the pollution continued unabated. Even today, as pollution threats to health and the environment persist, the government keeps knowledge about the associated risks from the public.

== Manual for Survival: A Chernobyl Guide to the Future ==
=== Reviews ===
Noah Sneider of The Economist praises the book as "a magisterial blend of historical research, investigative journalism and poetic reportage, Kate Brown sets out to uncover Chernobyl's true medical and environmental effects."

Philip Ball in the New Statesman speaks about the depth about her research: "She has obtained documents and records that seemingly no one else had ever read, including some that were plainly meant to stay as buried as the contaminated Chernobyl waste. The result is an extraordinary and important – if controversial – book."

Vitali Vitaliev of The Institution of Engineering and Technology calls the book "a magnificent monograph that stands out among the multiple books on Chernobyl simply because it tells us the truth – the whole unadulterated truth – about one of the worst disasters in history." and comments on the effort to downplay the effects: "Let's face it: the minimisation and even trimming-up of history's worst nuclear catastrophe has become a popular sport with some Western intellectuals, among whom I can count some deluded colleagues and friends. They keep repeating like a mantra the ‘magic’ number 62, the official death toll immediately after the 1986 explosion. By doing so, not only do they ignore the plight of tens of thousands of victims of the disaster, many of them children, who have since died of different forms of radiation sickness and cancer, they overlook the treacherous nature of the nuclear contamination and residual radiation capable of manifesting themselves years and even centuries after the tragic event. As Brown, a distinguished American scholar, herself remarks in the final part of her book: “Ignorance about low-dose exposure is, I have argued, partly deliberate.” and goes on to note: "Why were – and are – they doing it? The publishers of ‘Manual for Survival’ rightly suggest in the jacket blurb that the motivation for “(Western) scientists and diplomats from international organisations ... to bury and discredit the evidence” is that they were “worried that this evidence would blow the lid on the effects of massive radiation, released from weapons testing during the Cold War.”

Serhii Plokhy considers Browns research impressive and due to her 25 years of research in Ukraine, "Brown knows her landscape exceptionally well."

Writing in the Journal of Radiological Protection (JRP), Jim T. Smith criticized many aspects of Brown's Manual for Survival. He describes Brown's book as "deeply flawed and clearly biased history of the health and environmental impacts of Chernobyl". He criticized Brown for cherry picking, writing, "One of the major failings of this book is that the vast body of knowledge in the international scientific literature is almost completely ignored - except where it coincides with Brown's thesis." Smith disclosed in the conflict-of-interest section of his review that he had previously received funds from the nuclear energy industry.

Brown published a response to Smith's critique. In it, she noted that recent research is moving away from Smith's conclusions that nature in the Chernobyl Zone is thriving. E.g., a recent article in the JRP about the Kyshtym reserve in Siberia (the result of an explosion in an underground waste storage tank that released 20 million curies) ruled that 70 years later the affected forests have failed to recover to their pre-accident state and that the numbers of soil animals were 15%–77% of those observed in similar but uncontaminated sites. Smith, Brown said, failed to include in his review the work of researchers who show depressed populations in the Chernobyl Zone at all but the lowest doses, and similar findings from Fukushima that concur with Chernobyl data. Smith set up a non-profit to produce and sell “Atomic Vodka” from the Chernobyl Zone.

Jim Smith responds to five of Brown's claims in his reply. For one, he points out that she has dismissed evidence he presented to her and characterized him as a desk-bound physicist in her book, even though he has done regular field work in the Chernobyl exclusion zone over the decades. The other four points Brown discusses pertain to other claims Brown made in her response with regard to evidence gathering and contacting other scientists.

Dr. Geraldine Thomas, professor of pathology at Imperial College and founder of the Chernobyl Tissue Bank, also criticizes Brown's work. She states one flaw in Brown's logic: “It is just not true that the scientists try to minimize the effects of radiation. It would actually be against their own best interests to do so. They are mostly academics and are required to produce large amounts of money and papers for their institutes. You would be expecting them to argue for larger effects of radiation as the more serious the health consequences the more the money flows.”

Sophie Pinkham writes in The New York Review of Books: "Brown writes about anticipating outraged letters from nuclear scientists and plant workers, oncology clinic staff, and others whose jobs require exposure to radiation. She details her scrupulous efforts to check and double-check her data, consult with scientists from many fields, and account for factors that might skew results. I suspect that she may be accused of alarmism nonetheless." She comments that the book is about more than Chernobyl: "Brown's careful mapping of the path isotopes take is highly relevant to other industrial toxins, and to plastic waste. When we put a substance into our environment, we have to understand that it will likely remain with us for a very long time, and that it may behave in ways we never anticipated. Chernobyl should not be seen as an isolated accident or as a unique disaster, Brown argues, but as an "exclamation point" that draws our attention to the new world we are creating."

Nick Slater of Current Affairs criticized flaws in Brown's research methods writing: "Although Brown's aims are certainly admirable—the arguments she uses to support them are not."

== Books ==
- A Biography of No Place: From Ethnic Borderland to Ukrainian Heartland, 2004, Harvard University Press.
- Dispatches from Dystopia: Histories of Places Not Yet Forgotten, 2015, University of Chicago Press.
- Plutopia: Nuclear Families, Atomic Cities, and the Great Soviet and American Plutonium Disasters, 2013, Oxford University Press.
- Manual for Survival: A Chernobyl Guide to the Future, March 2019, W. W. Norton & Company.
- Tiny Gardens Everywhere: The Past, Present, and Future of the Self-Provisioning City, 2026, W. W. Norton & Company.

== Awards and honors ==
- 2004 George Louis Beer Prize, American Historical Association, A Biography of No Place
- 2009 Guggenheim Fellow
- 2014 Ellis W. Hawley Prize for Best Book in Political History, Organization of American Historians, Plutopia
- 2014 Robert G. Athearn Prize, Western History Association, Plutopia
- 2014 George Perkins Marsh Prize for Best Book in Environmental History, Plutopia
- 2014 Albert J. Beveridge Award from the American Historical Association, Plutopia
- 2014 Wayne S. Vucinich Prize of the Association for Slavic, East European, and Eurasian Studies, Plutopia
- 2015 John H. Dunning Prize, American Historical Association, Plutopia
- 2015 Election to the Society of American Historians
- 2015 University of Maryland Board of Regents Award for Excellence in Research
- 2016-17, Carnegie Foundation Fellowship.
- 2017 Berlin Prize from the American Academy in Berlin
- 2020 Ryszard Kapuściński Award, Long List, Manual for Survival
- 2020 National Book Critic Circle Finalist, Manual for Survival
- 2020 Pushkin House Award Shortlist, Manual for Survival
- 2020 Marshal D. Shulman Prize in foreign policy, Association for Slavic, East European, and Eurasian Studies, Manual for Survival
- 2020 Reginald Zelnik Prize in Russian/Eurasian history, Association for Slavic, East European, and Eurasian Studies, Manual for Survival
- 2021 Lаura Shannon Prize Finalist, Nanovic Institute for European Studies, Manual for Survival

== See also ==
- Eve Andree Laramee
- The Plutonium Files
- Eileen Welsome
- Ruth Faden
- Nuclear weapons tests
- Downwinders
- Nuclear Nebraska
- Plutonium in the environment
- Pollution of the Lake Karachay
- Sacrifice zone
