= WXYC =

Student radio station at the University of North Carolina at Chapel Hill

- Chapel Hill, North Carolina; United States
- Broadcast area: UNC-Chapel Hill campus
- Frequency: 89.3 MHz

Programming
- Format: College radio

Ownership
- Owner: Student Educational Broadcasting, Inc.

History
- First air date: 1977; 49 years ago

Technical information
- Licensing authority: FCC
- Facility ID: 63561
- Class: A
- ERP: 1,100 watts
- HAAT: 147 meters (482 ft)
- Transmitter coordinates: 35°51′59.5″N 79°9′59.1″W

Links
- Public license information: Public file; LMS
- Webcast: Listen live
- Website: www.wxyc.org

WXYC (89.3 FM) is an American radio station broadcasting a college radio format. Licensed to Chapel Hill, North Carolina, United States, the station is non-commercial and run by students of the University of North Carolina at Chapel Hill. The station is owned by Student Educational Broadcasting, Inc. The station operates with an effective radiated power of 1,100 watts, across 900 square miles, from an antenna height above average terrain of 147 meters (482 ft).

The station broadcasts 24 hours a day, 365 days a year. Its signal has been simulcast on the Internet by ibiblio since November 1994 and is credited as having performed the first Internet radio broadcast in the world. It can also be found on iTunes, where, based on listener feedback, it would appear to enjoy some popularity in the UK and the American Northeast among Internet listeners.

The station is known for an eclectic variety of content, including: jazz, blues, rock, hip hop, zydeco, metal, electronic music, folk music, bluegrass, country, traditional Asian music, traditional African music, calypso, samba, tejano, mariachi, Latin American music, funk, electroclash, synthpop, pop, cajun, doo wop, reggae, dance hall, classical, classic rock, and almost any other type of music.

There is a stated emphasis on music from the 20th century onwards (as opposed to classical), though classical music is played from time to time. Furthermore, there is a conscious attempt to give artists from North Carolina (especially the greater Chapel Hill area) more air time, but local artists do not dominate the content. There are also specialty talk shows that highlight sports, news, and student government at UNC. Specialty music shows exhibit material from UNC's Southern Folklife Collection, music usually considered too erratic, abrasive, or lengthy for regular radio play (even by WXYC's permissive standards), local music, newly released music, and electronic/dance. Additionally, every Thursday night there is a three-hour theme show. The theme of this show changes every week, but a few examples include: songs about chickens, music from Mexico, Swing music from occupied Europe, the northern England electronic scene, batucada, music performed by convicted criminals, and Carolina Soul of the 1960s through 1980s. Every few weeks, the Backyard Barbecue show features live performances from local artists.

WXYC's offices and studios are located in the Frank Porter Graham Student Union on the campus of the University of North Carolina. WXYC's transmitter is located on Jones Ferry Road in Chatham County, North Carolina.

WXYC is known for putting on dances throughout the year, usually at Cat's Cradle, with various themes, including the 80s, the early 1990s, and the best music released in the past year.

== History ==
Prior to 1977, WXYC was a carrier current AM station known as WCAR.

Until 1970, several UNC residence colleges had their own carrier current stations. Morrison Dormitory had WMO, Ehringhaus had WSTD, Granville Towers had WILD and Hinton James also had its own station. In the fall of 1969, Hinton James joined Ehringhaus to form WRSC (Radio South Campus). Meanwhile, Morrison and Granville Towers formed WCAR which broadcast from the basement of Granville West. In January 1970, all of these stations consolidated into WCAR. The WCAR studios were located in the basement of Ehringhaus Dormitory and broadcast to every other dorm via AM frequency 550 kHz. The management of WCAR planned to upgrade the service with the hope of eventually getting an FM license from the Federal Communications Commission (FCC). At that time, it was anticipated that the station would serve as a training ground for future broadcasters and not act solely an outlet for what was called at the time "progressive rock."

In order to achieve their ambitious plans, many WCAR staff members ran for Student Legislature (SL). In 1972, a running joke around campus was that the SL was made up of three parties, the liberals, the conservatives, and WCAR. Through the shrewd use of political power, WCAR was allocated the funds necessary to move its studios and offices to the Frank Porter Graham Student Union in 1973. UNC students Jim Srebro, Gary Rendsburg, Jim Bond, Bob Heymann, Randy Wolfe, Monte Plott, and George Frye were all instrumental in the upgrading of facilities and doing the preliminary engineering and legal work in order to be licensed as an FM station. A student referendum was held in 1973 to allocate the necessary funds to formally apply for and build an FM station. Through the work of WCAR volunteers, the referendum passed.

In 1974, WCAR received its construction permit from the FCC to begin building its FM station. When the UNC administration realized that this "new" FM station would be licensed with over 10,000 watts of power and therefore could be clearly heard in Raleigh and by members of the North Carolina General Assembly, it pulled its support for the entire project. The FCC subsequently canceled the construction permit.

In response, WCAR's management formed a not-for-profit corporation, Student Educational Broadcasting, Inc., which would become the new licensee of WXYC. Jim Srebro served as the first Chairman of Student Educational Broadcasting, Inc. In the intervening time, however, other new FM stations were licensed by the FCC in North Carolina which limited WXYC to only 400 watts of power when it went on the air in March 1977. In 2009 the station relocated its transmitter facilities and increased power to 1,100 watts.

On November 7, 1994 WXYC disc jockey Michael Shoffner set up the station's Internet radio broadcast, which runs to this day and is widely considered to be the first such broadcast.

Former logo

North Carolina Public Radio (WUNC) is also affiliated with the university.

== Alumni ==
- Mary Lattimore
- Rick Dees
- Peter Gammons, Boston Globe sportswriter
- Stuart Scott, deceased, coanchor of ESPN SportsCenter
- Ken Lowe, President and CEO of E.W. Scripps Co., who was known in the early 1970s by his WKIX air name of Steve Roddy
- Peyton Reed, director of The Weird Al Show and other films
- Kevin M. Kruse, historian
- Jim Bond, Washington D.C. retired broadcasting consultant, Bond and Pecaro
- Bob Heymann, former NBC and CBS radio announcer and current national radio and TV station broker at Media Services Group
- Randy Wolfe, CBS News producer
- John Altschuler, executive producer and writer for King of the Hill
- Deborah Potter, President and Executive Director of NewsLab, and a former correspondent for CBS and CNN, was station manager of WCAR in the early 1970s
- Scott Jacobson, TV writer for Bob's Burgers, formerly Saturday Night Live, The Daily Show
- Tom Maxwell, former member of the Squirrel Nut Zippers
- Dave Brylawski, former Polvo guitarist
- Colin Soloway, Newsweek reporter
- Brant Hart, Operations Manager at GHB Broadcasting in Charlotte. Hosted "The Unoriginal Sunday Night Hall of Fame" on WCAR 1971-73 as Brian Lee.
