= Meg Jacobs =

American historian

- Occupation: Historian
- Spouse: Julian Zelizer
- Awards: Ellis W. Hawley Prize (American Historical Association), Jeanne Rosselet Fellow (Harvard University)

Academic background
- Education: Cornell University, University of Virginia
- Thesis: The Politics of Purchasing Power: Political Economy, Consumption Politics, and State-Building, 1909-1959 (1998)
- Doctoral advisor: Nelson Lichtenstein

Academic work
- Discipline: History
- Sub-discipline: U.S. political history, political economy, public policy
- Institutions: Massachusetts Institute of Technology, Princeton University
- Notable works: Pocketbook Politics: Economic Citizenship in Twentieth-Century America (2005)

Meg Jacobs is a historian of U.S. political history and political economy. She is a Senior Research Scholar at the Princeton School of Public and International Affairs and in the Department of History at Princeton University.

== Academics ==
Jacobs graduated from Cornell University (BA) and the University of Virginia (MA, PhD). She was a professor at the Massachusetts Institute of Technology, and is a resident scholar at Princeton University.

Her research has centered on the political economy and the development of twentieth-century politics, such as the history of conservatism. In 2006, she won the American Historical Association's Ellis W. Hawley Prize for the best historical study on U.S. politics. Her major works include Pocketbook Politics: Economic Citizenship in Twentieth-Century America (2006) and Panic at the Pump: The Energy Crisis and the Transformation of American Politics in the 1970s (2016).

== Family ==
In 2012, she married fellow historian and political commentator Julian Zelizer at the Synagogue for the Arts in New York City presided over by the groom's father, Gerald. Her mother-in-law is economic sociologist, Viviana Rotman Zelizer.

== Works ==
- Pocketbook Politics: Economic Citizenship in Twentieth-Century America. Princeton University Press. 20 February 2007. ISBN 978-1-4008-4378-7.
- Meg Jacobs; William J. Novak; Julian E. Zelizer, eds. (10 January 2009). The Democratic Experiment: New Directions in American Political History. Princeton University Press. pp. 250–. ISBN 978-1-4008-2582-0.
- Meg Jacobs, Julian E. Zelizer, Conservatives in Power: The Reagan Years, 1981-1989: A Brief History with Documents, Bedford/St. Martin's, 2010, ISBN 9780312488314.
- Panic at the Pump: The Energy Crisis and the Transformation of American Politics in the 1970s. Farrar, Straus and Giroux. 19 April 2016. ISBN 978-0-374-71489-5.
