= Bring the War Home =

2018 book by Kathleen Belew

Bring the War Home: The White Power Movement and Paramilitary America
- Author: Kathleen Belew
- Publisher: Harvard University Press
- Publication date: 2018

Bring the War Home: The White Power Movement and Paramilitary America is a book written by Kathleen Belew.

== Background ==
Kathleen Belew is an American tenured associate professor of history at Northwestern University, and an international authority on the white-power movement. Belew argues in the book that the modern white power movement emerged from the loss of the Vietnam War. The book discusses the Oklahoma City bombing, Ruby Ridge, the Waco siege and the Greensboro massacre. Belew points out that it was during the conservative presidency of Ronald Reagan that the white power movement began to truly coalesce. She also observes that Louis Beam was one of the earliest proponents of white power and the concept of a leaderless resistance. The book rejects the idea that white supremacist violence is only done by lone wolves. Although the book was written before the Unite the Right rally, it provides a history of the movements that lead to the rally. Belew traces William Luther Pierce and his 1978 novel The Turner Diaries to the rise of white supremacists. Chapter seven presents evidence to support the involvement of women in white supremacist groups like the Aryan Nations. The book also discusses the history of the Ku Klux Klan.

== Reception ==
Anna J. Clutterbuck-Cook wrote in Library Journal that "this necessary work reminds readers that white violence—on behalf of, and against, the state—has a long and deep history." Patrick Blanchfield wrote in The Nation that the book is "Meticulously researched and powerfully argued." Amy Cooter criticized the book in Reason for characterizing the militia movement as an outgrowth of the white power movement. The book was included in The Guardian's list of the best books of 2018.
