= Robert Guillaumont =

French chemist (born 1933)

- Born: February 26, 1933 (age 93); Lyon, France
- Education: University of Paris VI (PhD, 1966)
- Known for: Actinide chemistry Nuclear fuel cycle chemistry
- Awards: Chevalier of the Légion d'honneur Chevalier of the Ordre National du Mérite; Officier of the Ordre des Palmes Académiques
- Scientific career
- Fields: Radiochemistry, Actinide chemistry
- Workplaces: University of Paris-Saclay; Orsay Institute of Nuclear Physics

Robert Guillaumont (born 26 February 1933 in Lyon) is a French chemist and honorary professor at the University of Paris-Saclay in Orsay (1967-1998), Member of the French Academy of Sciences and the French Academy of Technologies

== Career ==
Robert Guillaumont is a specialist in radiochemistry and actinide chemistry. He prepared his doctorate at the Institut radium de Paris, Curie Laboratory, University of Paris VI (1966). He continued his research in this Institute and then at the Radiochemistry Laboratory of the Orsay Institute of Nuclear Physics (1968–98), which he directed for twelve years (1979–90). He taught chemistry/radiochemistry at the University of Paris XI-Orsay (1967–98). His expertise covers the chemistry of the nuclear fuel cycle (from uranium mining to waste management and spent fuel reprocessing) and nuclear energy issues. He has been a member or chairman of numerous French and international committees dealing with the nuclear fuel cycle, nuclear energy, radioactive waste management and the synthesis and use of radionuclides for medicine. He was a member of the National Commission for the Evaluation of Research on Nuclear Materials and Radioactive Waste (1994-2019).

== Research ==
Robert Guillaumont began his research in 1959 on the chemistry of protactinium in solution. He showed that the electronic filling of the 5f underlay begins for this element. The UV absorption spectrum of Pa^{4+} is typical of a 5f^{1}6d^{1} transition (Pa atom: 5f^{2}6d^{1}7s^{2}). Together with his collaborators, he extended his methodology for studying the behaviour of radioelements in imponderable quantities to other actinides. The rest of his work can be linked to the common thread of the consequences of filling the atomic underlayer 5f on the physicochemical properties of actinides. This filling plays an essential role in the behaviour of the 15 actinides, especially when these electrons are delocalized, from protactinium (Pa) to americium (Am). This results in a high richness of oxidation degrees of the first actinides (usually from 3 to 6) and in the manifestation of particular effects in the series (electronic states characterized by the quantum number J). Thus, he studied the thermodynamic consequences of the population of sublayer 5f on a series of solution complexes (citric complexes of trivalent actinides from Am to fermium (Fm). He showed the existence of the "tetrad effect" for trivalent actinide complexes, an effect that reflects an extra-stabilization of the fundamental state of actinides for 1/4, 1/2 and 3/4 of the filling of the 5f underlay. After the curium (Cm), it is necessary, to carry out experiments, to synthesize isotopes of berkelium (Bk), einstenium (Es) and Fm by nuclear reactions with particle accelerators, and separate them from irradiated targets, which he did at Orsay. To conduct most of his research he developed the methodology for studying species and equilibria between species in extremely diluted solutions (which radioactivity allows until about 10^{−14} M), and he pushed, at the theoretical level, the description of the thermodynamic behaviour of a few atoms in terms of deviation from the law of mass action, which gave a foundation to chemical experiments on elements 6d (Z>103), produced atom by atom by radiochemists at accelerators.

At the same time, he participated in the study of thermodynamic and spectroscopic properties of elements 5f (and 4f) in connection with electronic transfers between these elements and their environment: covalence in two-phase solvent extraction systems and crystal field effect on solids, in particular single crystals examined at 4 K.

Finally, he continued his research on the fundamental problems of radionuclide migration in the environment (speciation, concentration effect, retention on colloids) and selective separation of actinides/lanthanides from the elements constituting spent nuclear fuel. R. Guillaumont's research themes are upstream of the many chemistry/radiochemistry problems encountered in "nuclear": chemistry of actinides from uranium to curium in the various stages of nuclear fuel cycles and radioactive waste management.

He has published more than 200 scientific articles, popular articles and has written several books.

== Honours and awards ==
- Chevalier of the Ordre national de la Légion d'Honneur
- Chevalier of the Ordre National du Mérite
- Officier of the Ordre des Palmes Académiques
