= Kathleen Belew =

American historian and author (born 1981)

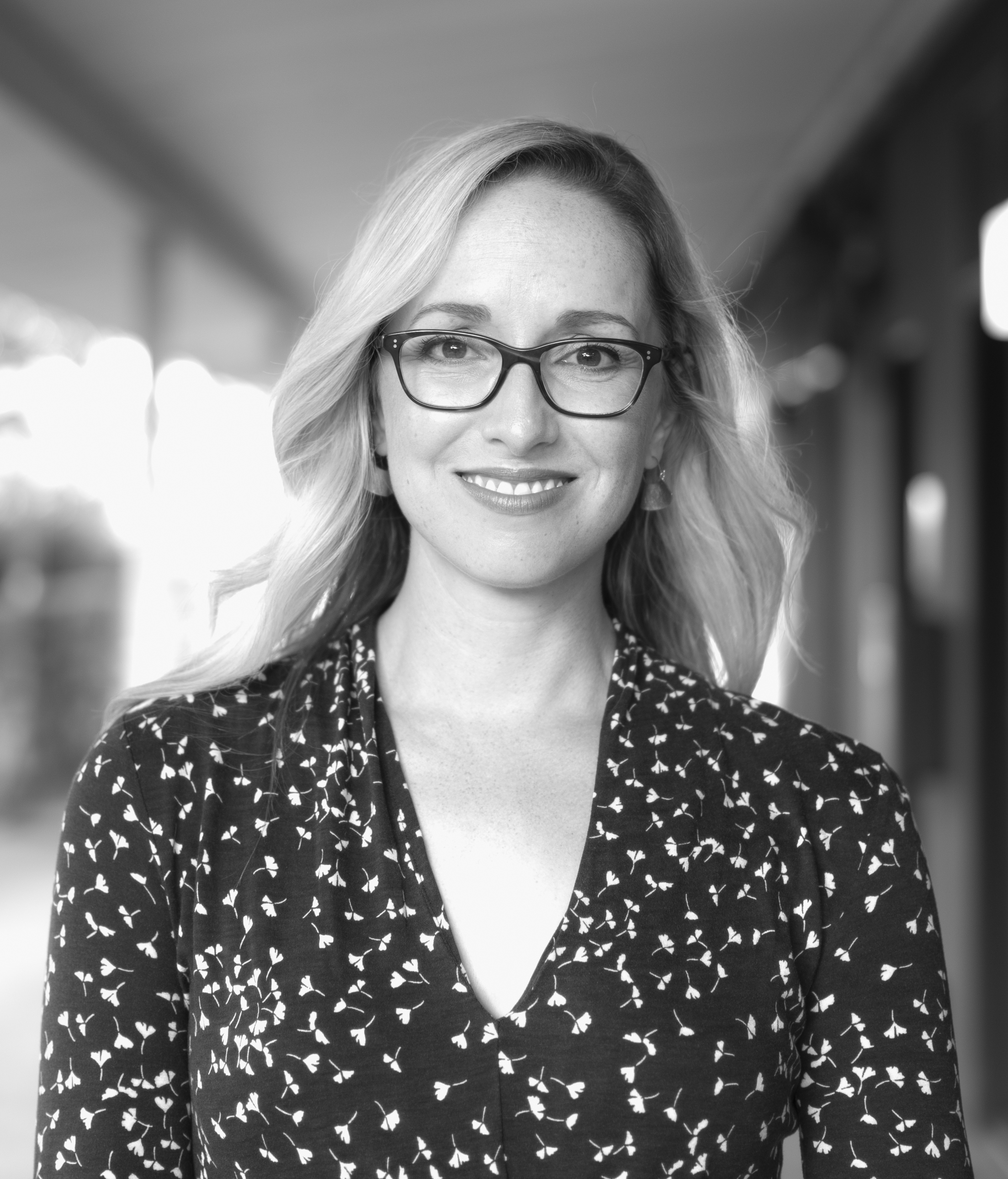
- Belew in 2019
- Born: November 11, 1981 (age 44)
- Occupations: Historian, professor, writer

Academic background
- Education: University of Washington; Yale University
- Website: www.kathleenbelew.com

Kathleen Belew (born November 11, 1981) is an American tenured associate professor of history at Northwestern University, and an international authority on the white power movement.

She is the author of Bring the War Home (2019), co-edited A Field Guide to White Supremacy (2021) with Ramón A. Gutiérrez, and contributed essays to The Presidency of Donald J. Trump: A First Historical Assessment (2022) and the New York Times bestseller Myth America: Historians Take on the Biggest Lies and Legends about Our Past (2023). Her forthcoming book, to be published by Random House, is titled Home at the End of the World. She has written for The New York Times, The Washington Post, The Daily Beast, CNN.com, and Dissent, and was a CNN contributor.

== Academic career ==
In 2005, Belew graduated with a bachelor's degree (B.A.) in the Comparative History of Ideas from University of Washington, where she was named Dean's Medalist in the Humanities. She obtained a master's degree (M.Phil.) in 2008, and then a doctoral degree (Ph.D.) in 2011, both in American Studies from Yale University. She was a professor of U.S. History at the University of Chicago, where she received tenure in 2021, until leaving for Northwestern University in 2022. Her research received the support of several organizations, such as the Chauncey and Marion Deering McCormick Foundation, the Andrew W. Mellon Foundation, and the Jacob K. Javits Foundation. She held postdoctoral fellowships from the Center for Advanced Study in the Behavioral Sciences at Northwestern University, Rutgers University, and Stanford University. Some of Belew's most popular courses include The American Apocalypse, History of the Present, The American Vigilante, and Histories of Violence. Her research and teaching focuses on the themes of history of the present, American conservatism, race, gender, violence, and the meaning of war, as well as racism, the white power movement, and militarism in the 21st-century United States.

Belew spent ten years of research to write her first book, Bring the War Home: The White Power Movement and Paramilitary America. Her research has been featured in several documentaries, such as Homegrown Hate: The War Among Us by ABC News and Documenting Hate: New American Nazis by PBS's Frontline, and she has appeared on The Rachel Maddow Show, The Last Word with Lawrence O'Donnell, Anderson Cooper 360°, Frontline, and NPR's Fresh Air and All Things Considered, among others. Between 2011 and 2019, there were 16 high-profile attacks linked to white nationalism around the world; 175 people were killed in these attacks. She commented: "Too many people still think of these attacks as single events, rather than interconnected actions carried out by domestic terrorists. We spend too much ink dividing them into anti-immigrant, racist, anti-Muslim or antisemitic attacks. True, they are these things. But they are also connected with one another through a broader white power ideology."

In September 2019, Belew was a witness at a congressional hearing on confronting white nationalism. In her witness statement, Belew described what she terms "the white power movement" as a "threat to our democracy", said that it was "transnational", and "connected neo-Nazis, Klansmen, skinheads, radical tax protestors, militia members, and others." She advocated forming something like the 2005 Greensboro Truth and Reconciliation Commission as a step towards a solution to the problem. Congressman Jim Jordan and other members of the Republican Party criticized Belew after she argued with the conservative witness Candace Owens.

== Works ==
=== Books ===
- Belew, Kathleen (2018). Bring the War Home: The White Power Movement and Paramilitary America. Harvard: Harvard University Press. ISBN 9780674237698. OCLC 1059238336.
- Belew, Kathleen; Gutiérrez, Ramón A., eds. (2021). A Field Guide to White Supremacy. Los Angeles: University of California Press. ISBN 9780520382527.
- Belew, Kathleen (2022). "Militant Whiteness in the Age of Trump". In Zelizer, Julian E. (ed.). The Presidency of Donald J. Trump: A First Historical Assessment. Princeton: Princeton University Press. pp. 83–102. ISBN 9780691228945.
- Belew, Kathleen (2023). "Insurrection". In Kruse, Kevin M.; Zelizer, Julian E. (eds.). Myth America: Historians Take On the Biggest Legends and Lies About Our Past. New York: Basic Books. ISBN 9781541601406.

=== Op-eds ===
- Belew, Kathleen (April 18, 2018). "The History of White Power". The New York Times.
- Belew, Kathleen (August 4, 2019). "The Right Way to Understand White Nationalist Terrorism". The New York Times.
- Belew, Kathleen (January 6, 2022). "Militia groups were hiding in plain sight on Jan. 6. They're still dangerous". The Washington Post.
- Belew, Kathleen (May 17, 2022). "The Long Game of White-Power Activists Isn't Just About Violence". The New York Times.
