= Nelson Lichtenstein =

American historian

Academic background
- Education: PhD
- Thesis: Industrial unionism under the no-strike pledge: a study of the CIO during the Second World War (1974)

Academic work
- Doctoral students: Jennifer Klein, Meg Jacobs

Nelson Lichtenstein (born November 15, 1944) is an American historian. He is a professor of history at the University of California, Santa Barbara, and director of the Center for the Study of Work, Labor and Democracy. He is a labor historian who has written also about 20th-century American political economy, including the automotive industry and Wal-Mart.

== Life and education ==
Lichtenstein received his bachelor's degree from Dartmouth College in 1966 and his Ph.D. in history from the University of California, Berkeley in 1974. He is MacArthur Foundation Chair in History at UCSB.

== Awards ==
Lichtenstein was named a junior fellow by the National Endowment for the Humanities (NEH) in 1982 and senior NEH fellow in 1993. He received a Rockefeller Foundation Fellowship to undertake research at Wayne State University in 1990. He held a Guggenheim Fellowship in 1997–98. He was elected to membership in the Society of American Historians in 2007 and became MacArthur Foundation Professor of History at UC Santa Barbara in 2010.

Lichtenstein's book State of the Union: A Century of American Labor won the Philip Taft Labor History Book Award in 2003. The Sidney Hillman Foundation awarded him the Sol Stetin Prize in 2012

== Books ==
=== Solely authored works ===
- Walter Reuther, The Most Dangerous Man in Detroit. Urbana, Ill.: University of Illinois Press, 1997. ISBN 0-252-06626-X Internet Archive link
- Labor's War at Home: The CIO in World War II. Philadelphia: Temple University Press, 2003. ISBN 1-59213-197-2 Google Books link
- State of the Union: A Century of American Labor. New edition. Princeton, N.J.: Princeton University Press, 2003. ISBN 0-691-11654-7 Google Books link
- The Retail Revolution: How Wal-Mart Created a Brave New World of Business.New York: Henry Holt and Company, 2009. ISBN 0-8050-7966-1
- A Contest of Ideas: Capital, Politics, and Labor. Urbana: University of Illinois Press, 2012.
- A Fabulous Failure: The Clinton Presidency and the Transformation of American Capitalism. Princeton: Princeton University Press, 2023. (with Judith Stein)

=== Co-authored works ===
- Who Built America? Vol. 2: 1865 to the Present, with Roy Rosenzweig and Joshua Brown. Boston: Bedford Books, 2007.

=== Edited works ===
- On the Line: Essays in the History of Auto Work, co-edited with Stephen Meyer. Urbana: University of Illinois Press, 1988.
- Industrial Democracy in America, co-edited with Harris Howell John. Cambridge: Cambridge University Press, 1993.
- Major Problems in the History of American Workers, with Eileen Boris. Houghton Mifflin, 2002.
- American Capitalism: Social Thought and Political Economy in the Twentieth Century, Philadelphia: University of Pennsylvania Press, 2006. ISBN 0-8122-3923-7 Google Books link
- Wal-Mart: The Face of Twenty-First-Century Capitalism, New York: The New Press, 2005. Cloth ISBN 1-59558-035-2; Paperback ISBN 1-59558-021-2
- The Right and Labor in America: Politics, Ideology, and Imagination, co-edited with Elizabeth Tandy Shermer. Philadelphia: University of Pennsylvania Press, 2012.
- The Port Huron Statement: Sources and Legacies of the New Left's Founding Manifesto, co-edited with Richard Flacks. Philadelphia: University of Pennsylvania Press, 2015.
- The ILO from Geneva to the Pacific Rim: West Meets East, co-edited with Jill Jensen. New York: Palgrave Macmillan, 2015.
- Achieving Workers' Rights in the Global Economy, co-edited with Richard Applebaum. Ithaca: Cornell University Press, 2016.
- Beyond the New Deal Order: U.S. Politics from the Great Depression to the Great Recession, co-edited with Gary Gerstle and Alice O'Connor. Philadelphia: University of Pennsylvania Press, 2019.
- Capitalism Contested: The New Deal and It's Legacies, co-edited with Romain Huret and Christian Vinel. Philadelphia: University of Pennsylvania Press, 2020.
