= Jennifer Klein (academic) =

American historian and government official

- Born: Miami, Florida
- Title: Bradford Durfee Professor of History, Yale University
- Spouse: James Berger

Academic background
- Education: Ph.D.
- Alma mater: Barnard College, University of Virginia
- Thesis: Managing security: The business of American social policy, 1910s-1960
- Doctoral advisor: Nelson Lichtenstein

Academic work
- Discipline: History
- Sub-discipline: Labor history, Women's history
- Institutions: Yale University

Jennifer Klein is an American professor of 20th century U.S. history at Yale University. Klein's work specializes in social history and the history of healthcare provision.

She graduated from Barnard College, and from the University of Virginia. She is a professor at Yale University. She is Senior Editor of International Labor and Working Class History.

== Awards and honors ==
Klein has won an Ellis W. Hawley Prize, the Hans Sigrist Prize, and the Sara A. Whaley prize.

== Works ==
- Caring for America: Home Health Workers in the Shadow of the Welfare State. Oxford University Press. 1 July 2015. ISBN 978-0-19-937858-6.
- Jennifer Klein (2 January 2010). For All These Rights: Business, Labor, and the Shaping of America's Public-Private Welfare State. Princeton University Press. pp. 281–. ISBN 978-1-4008-3566-9.
