= Inventing the "American Way" =

2008 history book by Wendy L. Wall

- Author: Wendy L. Wall
- Published: January 18, 2008 (Oxford University Press)
- Publication place: United States
- Pages: 400
- ISBN: 9780195329100

Inventing the "American Way": The Politics of Consensus from the New Deal to the Civil Rights Movement is a 2008 book by American historian Wendy L. Wall, a professor at Queen's University. It deals with postwar consensus politics and a national unity which developed from governmental response to the rise of communism and fascism. Wall argues that national unity projects were forged, in order to unite Americans around what seemed to be their common values.

According to Kevin M. Kruse from Princeton University, Wall shows that "concepts most Americans now take for granted were created at mid-century to mask deep divisions in American society". Projects such as the Freedom Train and Letters from America were built in support of capitalism and protection from other ideologies.

According to Jeremi Suri from the University of Wisconsin, this book covers new ground in careful analysis of how "politicians, intellectuals, businesspeople, labor unions, and ethnic organizations worked—in shifting coalitions—to promote a predominant set of assumptions about citizenship and patriotism."

== Awards ==
The book has received the Ellis W. Hawley Prize of the Organization of American Historians in 2008 and the Phi Alpha Theta Best First Book Award.
