= Julian E. Zelizer =

American political historian (born 1969)

Julian Zelizer
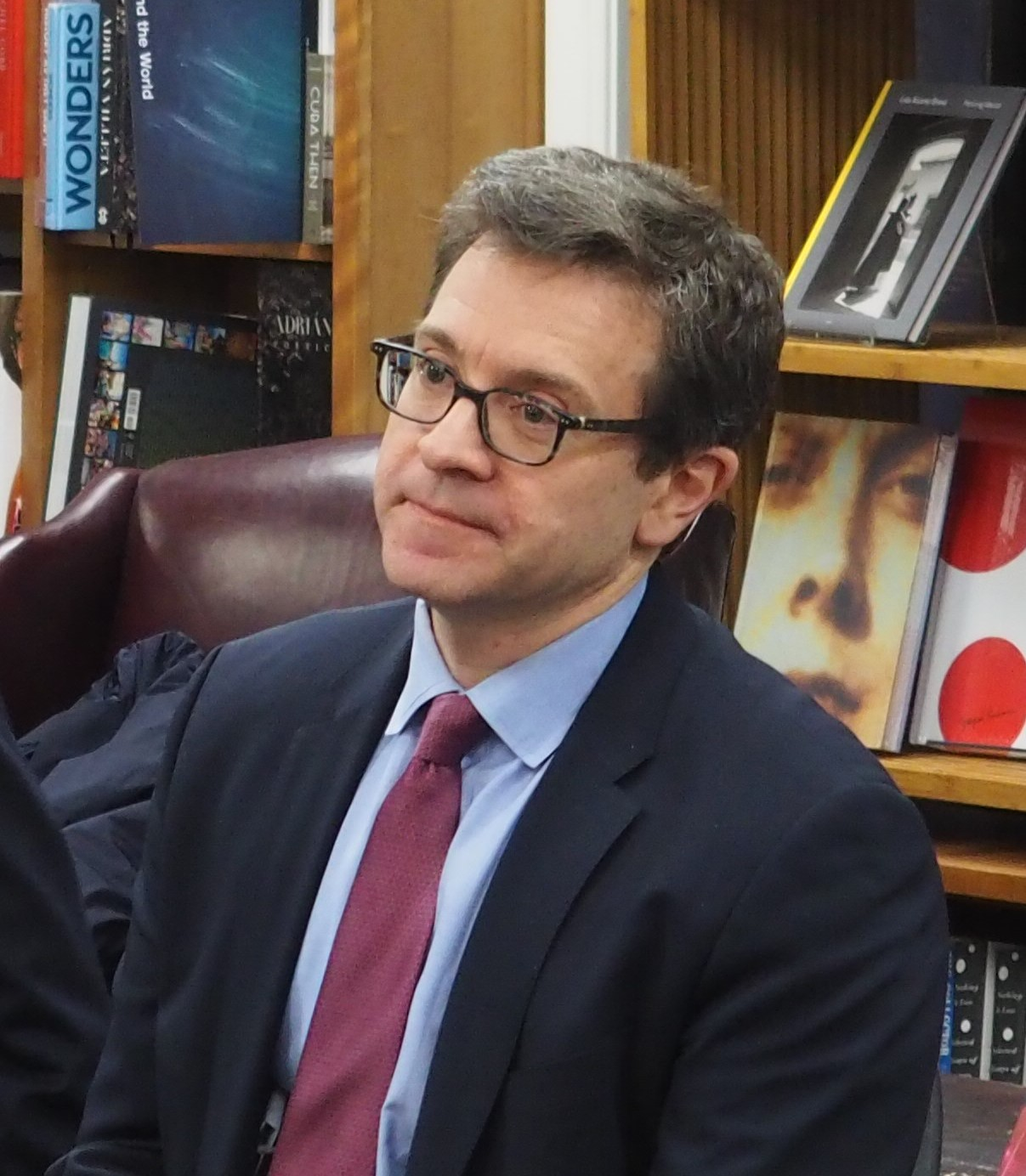
- Born: December 6, 1969 (age 56)
- Education: Brandeis University (BA); Johns Hopkins University (MA, PhD)
- Spouses: Nora Moran (m. 1996, divorced) Meg Jacobs (m. 2012)
- Relatives: Viviana Zelizer (mother)

Julian Emanuel Zelizer (born December 6, 1969) is an American professor of political history at Princeton University. Zelizer focuses on the second half of the twentieth century and the twenty-first century. He has authored or co-authored several books on American political history and is a columnist for Foreign Policy magazine.

== Education ==
Raised in Metuchen, New Jersey, Zelizer was educated at Metuchen High School, a comprehensive public high school, followed by Brandeis University. He obtained a PhD in history from Johns Hopkins University.

== Life and career ==
Zelizer has contributed to CNN.com and The Atlantic. He is a regular commentator on news programs and has appeared in several documentary films. He penned the introduction to a 2016 edition of the Kerner report. He is the Malcolm Stevenson Forbes Professor of History and Public Policy.

He has twice won the D. B. Hardeman Prize, for Taxing America: Wilbur D. Mills, Congress, and the State, 1945–1975 and The Fierce Urgency of Now: Lyndon Johnson, Congress, and the Battle for the Great Society.

Fault Lines: A History of the United States Since 1974, co-authored with Kevin M. Kruse, received wide critical acclaim.

Zelizer's book, Burning Down the House: Newt Gingrich, the Fall of a Speaker, and the Rise of the New Republican Party, was called "insightful" by The New York Times, which also recognized it as one of the "100 Notable Books of 2020". The Washington Post wrote that it was "engaging" and "timely".

In 2025, Zelizer began a Substack publication online that is entitled, The Long View, and is intended to provide a historical perspective to breaking news that enables free and paid subscribers to gain a better understanding of current events.

== Personal life ==
Zelizer is the son of the Princeton sociologist Viviana Zelizer and Gerald L. Zelizer, a notable Metuchen rabbi. In 1996, he married Nora Kay Moran at Congregation Adas Israel in Washington, D.C., presided over by his father. In 2012, he married fellow historian Meg Jacobs at the Synagogue for the Arts in New York City, again presided over by his father.

== Books ==
- Taxing America: Wilbur D. Mills, Congress, and the State, 1945–1975 (1999) Cambridge University Press.
- The American Congress: The Building of Democracy (2004), Mariner Books.
- On Capitol Hill: The Struggle to Reform Congress and its Consequences, 1948–2000 (2004) Cambridge University Press
- Arsenal of Democracy: The Politics of National Security – From World War II to the War on Terrorism (2009) Basic Books
- Jimmy Carter: The American Presidents Series: The 39th President, 1977–1981 (2010) Times Books
- Conservatives in Power: The Reagan Years, 1981–1989: A Brief History with Documents (2011), with Meg Jacobs Bedford/St. Martin's
- Governing America: The Revival of Political History (2012) Princeton University Press
- The Fierce Urgency of Now: Lyndon Johnson, Congress, and the Battle for the Great Society (2015)
- Media Nation: The Political History of News in Modern America (2017), editor, with Bruce J. Schulman
- The Presidency of Barack Obama: A First Historical Assessment (2018), editor
- Fault Lines: A History of the United States Since 1974 (2019), with Kevin M. Kruse
- Burning Down the House: Newt Gingrich, the Fall of a Speaker, and the Rise of the New Republican Party (2020)
- Abraham Joshua Heschel: A Life of Radical Amazement (2021)
- Defining the Age: Daniel Bell, His Time and Ours (2022), editor
- The Presidency of Donald J. Trump: A First Historical Assessment (2022), editor
- Myth America: Historians Take On the Biggest Legends and Lies About Our Past (2023), editor
- In Defense of Partisanship (2025) Columbia Global Reports

In addition to authoring the books listed above, Zelizer has edited or co-edited a number of books including, most recently, Our Nation at Risk: Election Integrity as a National Security Issue.
