= Kevin M. Kruse =

American historian

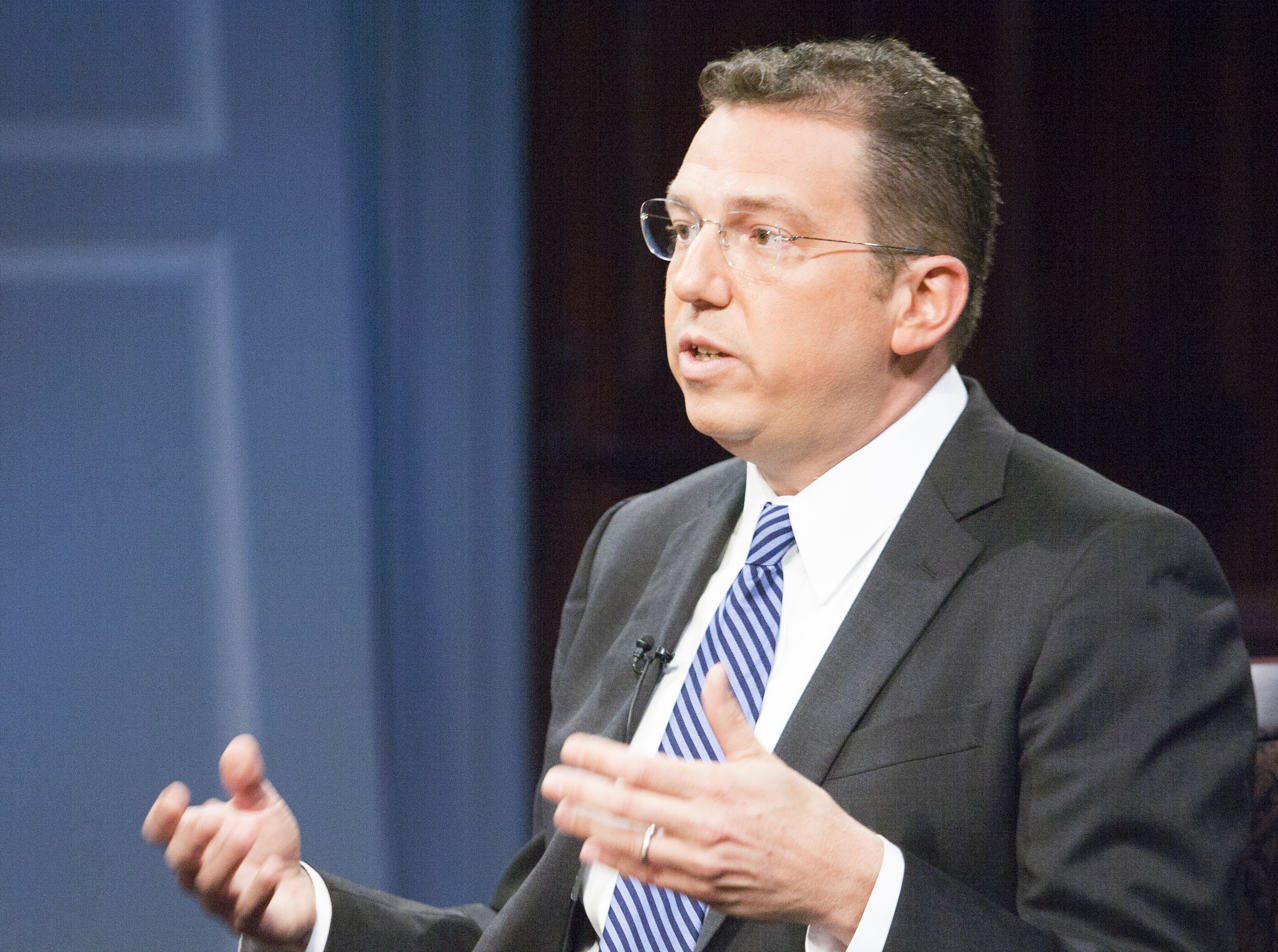
- Kruse in 2015
- Born: Kevin Michael Kruse; 1972 (age 53–54); Kansas City, Kansas, U.S.
- Children: 2

Academic background
- Education: University of North Carolina at Chapel Hill; Cornell University
- Thesis: White Flight (2000)
- Doctoral advisor: Richard Polenberg

Academic work
- Discipline: History
- Sub-discipline: 20th-century American history; political history; social history; urban history
- Institutions: Princeton University
- Website: kevinmkruse.com

Kevin Michael Kruse (born 1972) is an American historian and a professor of history at Princeton University. His research interests include the political, social, and urban/suburban history of 20th-century America, with a particular focus on the making of modern conservatism. Outside of academia, Kruse attracted substantial attention and following in the mid-2010s for his Twitter threads where he provided historical context for and applied historical research to current political events.

== Early life and education ==
Kruse was born in Kansas City, Kansas, to a conservative middle-class family; his father was an accountant, and he has three siblings. He moved with his family to Nashville, Tennessee, where he attended Montgomery Bell Academy.

Kruse graduated Phi Beta Kappa from the University of North Carolina at Chapel Hill with a bachelor's degree in history. While there he was a DJ at the student radio station WXYC. He received his master's and PhD degrees from Cornell University. He wrote his PhD dissertation on white flight in Atlanta.

== Career ==
In 2000, Kruse joined the faculty of the Princeton University Department of History. In 2019, Kruse was awarded the Guggenheim Fellowship in General Nonfiction by the John Simon Guggenheim Foundation to support archival research for his next book, The Division: John Doar, the Justice Department, and the Civil Rights Movement. In May 2020, Kruse was elected to the Society of American Historians.

=== Books ===
In addition to authoring the books listed below, Kruse has co-edited four books, Fog of War: The Second World War and the Civil Rights Movement, Spaces of the Modern City: Imaginaries, Politics and Everyday Life, The New Suburban History, and Myth America: Historians Take On the Biggest Legends and Lies About Our Past. He also contributed a chapter to The 1619 Project: A New Origin Story.

==== White Flight: Atlanta and the Making of Modern Conservatism ====
In 2005, Kruse wrote White Flight: Atlanta and the Making of Modern Conservatism, which explores the links between the resistance to desegregation and the rise of modern conservatism. The book won the 2007 Francis B. Simkins Award for best first book by an author in the field of southern history from the Southern Historical Association and the 2007 Malcolm and Muriel Barrow Bell Award for the best book on Georgia History from the Georgia Historical Society. It was also co-winner of the 2007 Best Book Award in Urban Politics from the Urban Politics Section of the American Political Science Association.

Historian Allison Dorsey wrote in The American Historical Review that the book is "well-researched, persuasively argued" and "a brilliant analysis of race, class, and politics". Historian Amanda I. Seligman wrote in the journal Urban History (CUP) that the book provides an "important contribution to the scholarship on the political significance of cities and suburbs in the late twentieth-century United States" pointing its greatest strength in "its reading of the subtleties of local and national politics" but criticized "Kruse's identification of Atlanta as the originator of modern conservatism" as exaggerated.

==== One Nation Under God: How Corporate America Invented Christian America ====
In 2015, Kruse wrote One Nation Under God: How Corporate America Invented Christian America. Historian D. G. Hart wrote: "America was founded in 1776, but it was only in 1953, with the inauguration of Dwight David Eisenhower as the 34th president, that it became a Christian nation. Such is Kevin M. Kruse's thesis and, after reading One Nation Under God, it makes perfect sense." Hart concluded that the book "is an important and convincing reminder that the roots of Christian America were cultivated well before the era of the religious right. What it fails to do is to supply much evidence of the subtitle's claim that 'Corporate America Invented Christian America'."

Historian Axel R. Schäfer reviewing the book in The American Historical Review, wrote that the book is "intriguing and insightful" but stated that "it revels too much in human-interest stories and ad hominem arguments" and that it's "too focused on the idea that Christianizing the nation was a marketing ploy designed by corporate titans who enlisted conservative clergymen in an effort to construct a Christian libertarianism capable of defeating the New Deal".

Writing for The New York Times, historian Michael Kazin said: "Kruse tells a big and important story about the mingling of religiosity and politics since the 1930s. Still, he oversells his basic premise. Americans easily accepted placing God's name on their currency and in the oath children recite every school day because similar invocations were already routine in public discourse — from the Declaration's reference to the “unalienable Rights” endowed by the “Creator” to the official chaplains who have opened sessions of the House and Senate with a prayer since 1789."

==== Fault Lines: A History of the United States Since 1974 ====
In 2019, Kruse co-authored Fault Lines: A History of the United States Since 1974 with Julian E. Zelizer; the book is based on the course that they created together at Princeton University, The United States Since 1974.

Michaelangelo Matos, writing for Rolling Stone, praised the book as "a sharp summation of how we moved from post-New Deal liberalism to an increasingly hard-right philosophy", saying that "its deep detail and taut-as-a-thriller pacing make up for the repetition" of its premise that "from the 1970s on, the United States would seem less and less united with each passing decade”. Barton Swaim, writing for The Wall Street Journal, was more critical, saying: "In “Fault Lines,” conservatives are almost invariably the aggressors in the culture wars and so primarily responsible for the widening gulf between Americans of left and right." He concluded, "Messrs. Kruse and Zelizer miss perhaps the most relevant fault line of our time: the line between disdainful elites who equate reality with their own interpretations and everybody else."

=== Twitter threads and public career ===
Kruse joined Twitter in February 2015 at the request of the publisher of One Nation Under God. In September 2015, Kruse posted his first Twitter thread in response to a tweet by Joe Scarborough describing Barack Obama as the "most partisan president ever"; in the thread, Kruse argued that Obama's early years in office "showed bipartisan outreach we have not seen in the modern era before".

In July 2018, Kruse posted a Twitter thread naming several Dixiecrats who had switched their political affiliations to the Republican Party in response to a tweeted challenge by right-wing political commentator Dinesh D'Souza to name the Dixiecrats who switched to the Republican Party in protest of the Democratic Party's embrace of the civil rights movement. Later, D'Souza falsely claimed that in the time of Abraham Lincoln, the Republican Party supported protecting the rights of legal immigrants; Kruse responded by noting that there was no distinction between legal and illegal immigrants at the time. Kruse gained additional prominence from these tweets, with his Twitter following growing to 160,000 over the next three months.

In 2019 Kruse contributed an article to The 1619 Project titled: "A traffic jam in Atlanta would seem to have nothing to do with slavery. But look closer..." (or "How Segregation Caused Your Traffic Jam"). The article discussed how Jim Crow segregation, the building of the highway system in the United States, and opinions on public transit have affected African American communities, particularly in Atlanta and other Southern cities. A slightly modified version was later published as "Traffic" in the 2021 companion volume The 1619 Project: A New Origin Story.

=== Accusations of plagiarism ===
In June 2022, Phillip W. Magness (of the American Institute for Economic Research) in Reason accused Kruse of plagiarism in his 2000 doctoral dissertation, his 2005 book White Flight, and other works. In The Daily Princetonian: "Kruse expressed 'surprise' at the allegations and attributed the lack of citations in one instance to an inadvertent oversight." The Daily Princetonian and The Chronicle of Higher Education, which discussed the story, both noted past animosity between Magness and Kruse on politically fraught academic matters. A review of the allegations by the Chronicle stated that "what Kruse did in those instances is, by almost any definition, plagiarism" and noted that it "is certainly plagiarism under Princeton's guidelines, which specifically say that sloppiness is not an acceptable excuse."

In October 2022, Kruse stated on his Twitter account that both Cornell, where he wrote his dissertation, and Princeton, where he is employed, ultimately determined that these were "citation errors" and did not rise to the level of intentional plagiarism. Magness then posted fresh accusations of plagiarism in other works by Kruse on Twitter. According to Kruse's statements on Twitter, Cornell found no intent of plagiarism and took no further action in the matter. Kruse also tweeted a statement from Princeton's Dean of Faculty stating that Kruse's citations could have been formatted better, but that the mistakes were "honest" and "the result of careless cutting and pasting" with "no attempt to conceal an intellectual debt." In The Atlantic, academic Tyler Austin Harper expressed skepticism of Princeton's conclusion, writing "“careless cutting and pasting” seems to be a pretty good working definition of plagiarism."

== Personal life ==
Kruse identifies as a liberal, though he has claimed that he is "too amenable to compromise and coalition-building to be an avatar of the far left". Kruse and his wife have two children. He is a fan of the Kansas City Chiefs.

== Publications ==
- White Flight: Atlanta and the Making of Modern Conservatism (Princeton University Press, 2005) ISBN 9780691133867
- The New Suburban History (University of Chicago Press, 2006), co-edited with Thomas Sugrue ISBN 9780226456621
- co-edited with Gyan Prakash, Spaces of the Modern City (Princeton University Press, 2008), ISBN 9780691133393
- Fog of War: The Second World War and the Civil Rights Movement (Oxford University Press, 2012), co-edited with Stephen Tuck
- One Nation Under God: How Corporate America Invented Christian America (Basic Books, 2015) ISBN 9780465097418
- with Julian E. Zelizer, Fault Lines: A History of the United States Since 1974 (W. W. Norton & Company, 2019), ISBN 9780393357707
- co-edited with Julian E. Zelizer, Myth America: Historians Take On the Biggest Legends and Lies About Our Past (Basic Books, 2023), ISBN 978-1541601390
