= Journal of Planning History =

- Discipline: City planning, history
- Language: English
- Edited by: Bent D. Ryan, Sanjeev Vidyarthi

Publication details
- History: 2002–present
- Publisher: SAGE Publications on behalf of the Society for American City and Regional Planning History
- Frequency: Quarterly
- Impact factor: (2010)

Standard abbreviations
- ISO 4: J. Plan. Hist.

Indexing
- ISSN: 1538-5132 (print); 1552-6585 (web)
- LCCN: 2002212546
- OCLC no.: 48819102

Links
- Journal homepage; Online access; Online archive

The Journal of Planning History is a quarterly peer-reviewed academic journal that covers the field of history of city planning. The journal's editors-in-chief are Brent D. Ryan (Massachusetts Institute of Technology) and Sanjeev Vidyarthi (University of Illinois Chicago). It was established in 2002 and is published by SAGE Publications on behalf of the Society for American City and Regional Planning History.

== Abstracting and indexing ==
The journal is abstracted and indexed in:

- America: History and Life
- Academic Search
- CSA Worldwide Political Science Abstracts
- GEOBASE
- Historical Abstracts
- Scopus
- Sociological Abstracts
