= Actinides in the environment =

The actinide series is a group of chemical elements with atomic numbers ranging from 89 to 102, (Note: Lawrencium, element 103, is sometimes included in the actinide series despite being a part of the 6d transition series.) including notable elements such as uranium and plutonium. The nuclides (or isotopes) thorium-232, uranium-235, and uranium-238 occur primordially, while trace quantities of actinium, protactinium, neptunium, and plutonium exist as a result of radioactive decay and, in the case of neptunium and plutonium, neutron capture of uranium. (Note: It is suspected, though unconfirmed, that the long-lived isotope ^{244}Pu may exist primordially.) These elements have much shorter half-lives than the naturally occurring thorium and uranium, and thus are far more radioactive. Elements with atomic numbers greater than 94 do not exist naturally on Earth, and must be produced in a nuclear reactor. However, certain isotopes of elements up to californium (atomic number 98) still have practical applications which take advantage of their radioactive properties.

While all actinides are radioactive, actinides and their compounds comprise a significant portion of the Earth's crust. There is enough thorium and uranium to be commercially mined, with thorium having a concentration in the Earth's crust about four times that of uranium. The global production of uranium in 2021 was over six million tons, with Australia having been the leading supplier. Thorium is extracted as a byproduct of titanium, zirconium, tin, and rare earths from monazite, from which thorium is often a waste product. Despite its greater abundance in the Earth's crust, the low demand for thorium in comparison to other metals extracted alongside thorium has led to a global surplus.

The primary hazard associated with actinides is their radioactivity, though they may also cause heavy metal poisoning if absorbed into the bloodstream. Generally, ingested insoluble actinide compounds, such as uranium dioxide and mixed oxide (MOX) fuel, will pass through the digestive tract with little effect since they have long half-lives, and cannot dissolve and be absorbed into the bloodstream. Inhaled actinide compounds, however, will be more damaging as they remain in the lungs and irradiate lung tissue.

== Actinium ==
Actinium can be found naturally in traces in uranium ore as ^{227}Ac, which is an alpha and beta emitter with a half-life of 21.773 years. Uranium ore contains about 0.2 mg of actinium per ton of uranium. It is more commonly made in milligram amounts by neutron irradiation of ^{226}Ra in a nuclear reactor. Natural actinium almost exclusively consists of one isotope, ^{227}Ac, with only minute traces of other shorter-lived isotopes (^{225}Ac and ^{228}Ac) occurring in other decay chains.

== Thorium ==
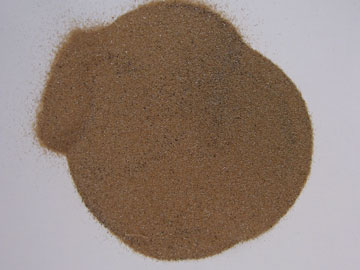
Monazite, a rare-earth-and-thorium-phosphate mineral, is the primary source of the world's thorium

Thorium is found at low levels in most rocks and soils, where it is about three times more abundant than uranium and about as abundant as lead. On average, soil commonly contains around 6 parts per million (ppm) thorium. Thorium occurs in several minerals; the most common is the rare earth-thorium-phosphate mineral monazite, which contains up to 12% thorium oxide, of which several countries have substantial deposits. ^{232}Th decays very slowly, with its half-life being 14.0 billion years, about three times the age of the Earth. Other isotopes of thorium occur in the thorium and uranium decay chains. These are shorter-lived and hence much more radioactive than ^{232}Th, though on a mass basis they are negligible.

Thorium has been linked to liver cancer. In the past, thoria (thorium dioxide) was used as a contrast agent for medical X-ray radiography, sold under the name Thorotrast. This use has since been discontinued. In India, a large amount of thorium ore can be found in the form of monazite in placer deposits of the Western and Eastern coastal dune sands, particularly in the Tamil Nadu coastal areas. The residents of this area are exposed to a naturally occurring radiation dose ten times higher than the worldwide average.

== Protactinium ==
Protactinium is one of the rarest and most expensive naturally occurring elements. It is found in the form of two isotopes, ^{231}Pa and ^{234}Pa, with the isotope ^{234}Pa occurring in two different energy states. Nearly all natural protactinium is ^{231}Pa. It is an alpha emitter and is formed by the decay of uranium-235, whereas the beta-radiating ^{234}Pa is produced as a result of uranium-238 decay. Nearly all uranium-238 (99.8%) decays first to the shorter-lived ^{234m}Pa isomer.

Protactinium occurs in uraninite (pitchblende) at concentrations of about 0.3–3 parts ^{231}Pa per million parts (ppm) of ore. Whereas the usual content is closer to 0.3 ppm(e.g. in Jáchymov, Czech Republic), some ores from the Democratic Republic of the Congo have about 3 ppm. Protactinium is homogeneously dispersed in most natural materials and in water, but at much lower concentrations on the order of one part per trillion, corresponding to a radioactivity of 0.1 picocuries (pCi)/g. There is about 500 times more protactinium in sandy soil particles than in water, even when compared to water present in the same sample of soil. Much higher ratios of 2,000 and above are measured in loam soils and clays, such as bentonite.

== Uranium ==
Uranium is present in almost all soils. It is more plentiful than antimony, beryllium, cadmium, gold, mercury, silver, or tungsten, and is about as abundant as arsenic or molybdenum. Significant concentrations of uranium occur in some substances such as phosphate rock deposits, minerals such as lignite, and monazite sands in uranium-rich ores, where it is also commercially extracted from.

Seawater contains about 3.3 parts per billion of uranium by weight as uranium (VI), which forms soluble carbonate complexes. Extraction of uranium from seawater has been considered as a means of obtaining the element. Because of the very low specific activity of uranium, the chemical effects of it upon living things can often outweigh the effects of its radioactivity. Additional uranium has been added to the environment in some locations from the nuclear fuel cycle and the use of depleted uranium in munitions.

== Neptunium ==
Neptunium can be found naturally in low concentrations in uranium ore, where atoms of uranium-238 capture neutrons and undergo transmutation reactions, resulting in neptunium-237 and neptunium-239. Neptunium has a high affinity for soil. Despite this, it is relatively mobile over the long term, and diffusion of ^{237}Np in groundwater is a major issue in designing a deep geological repository for permanent storage of spent nuclear fuel. ^{237}Np has a half-life of 2.144 million years and is therefore a long-term problem; its half-life is still much shorter than those of uranium-238, uranium-235, or uranium-236, and therefore ^{237}Np has higher specific activity than those nuclides. It is used only to make plutonium-238 when bombarded with neutrons in a lab.

== Plutonium ==
Plutonium occurs naturally in low concentrations in uranium ore. Plutonium-238 is a product of the double beta decay of uranium-238, and plutonium-239 is a decay product of neptunium-239, which occurs when ^{238}U undergoes a transmutation reaction due to neutron capture. Plutonium-240 and plutonium-244 can also be found in nature, of which the latter's half-life of 81.3 million years has had it be suggested as a primordial radionuclide, though early reports of its detection could not be confirmed. Plutonium has many applications, and through these applications, trace amounts of plutonium have been released into the environment. Plutonium's applications include:

- Atomic batteries in satellites, rovers, and pacemakers
- Atomic bomb detonations and safety trials
- Nuclear crime
- Nuclear fuel cycle
- Nuclear power plants

=== Environmental chemistry ===
Plutonium, like other actinides, readily forms a dioxide. In the environment, this plutonyl readily complexes with carbonate as well as other oxygen moieties (OH^{−}, NO_{2}^{−}, NO_{3}^{−}, and SO_{4}^{2−}) to form charged complexes which can be readily mobile with low affinities to soil. These include:

- PuO_{2}CO_{3}^{2−}
- PuO_{2}(CO_{3})_{2}^{4−}
- PuO_{2}(CO_{3})_{3}^{6−}

PuO_{2} formed from neutralizing highly acidic nitric acid solutions tends to form polymeric PuO_{2} which is resistant to complexation. Plutonium also readily shifts valences between the +3, +4, +5 and +6 states. It is common for some fraction of plutonium in solution to exist in all of these states in equilibrium.

Like neptunium, plutonium is known to bind to soil particles very strongly. While caesium has very different chemistry from the actinides, it is well known that both caesium and many actinides bind strongly to the minerals in soil. It has been possible to use ^{134}Cs-labeled soil to study the migration of Pu and Cs is soils. It has been shown that colloidal transport processes control the migration of Cs (and thus will control the migration of Pu) in the soil at the Waste Isolation Pilot Plant.

== Americium ==
Americium often enters landfills from discarded smoke detectors. The rules for the disposal of smoke detectors are very relaxed in most municipalities. For instance, in the UK it is permissible to dispose of a smoke detector containing americium by placing it in the trash with normal household waste, but each trashcan is limited to only contain one smoke detector. The manufacture of products containing americium, as well as nuclear reactors and explosions, may also release americium into the environment.

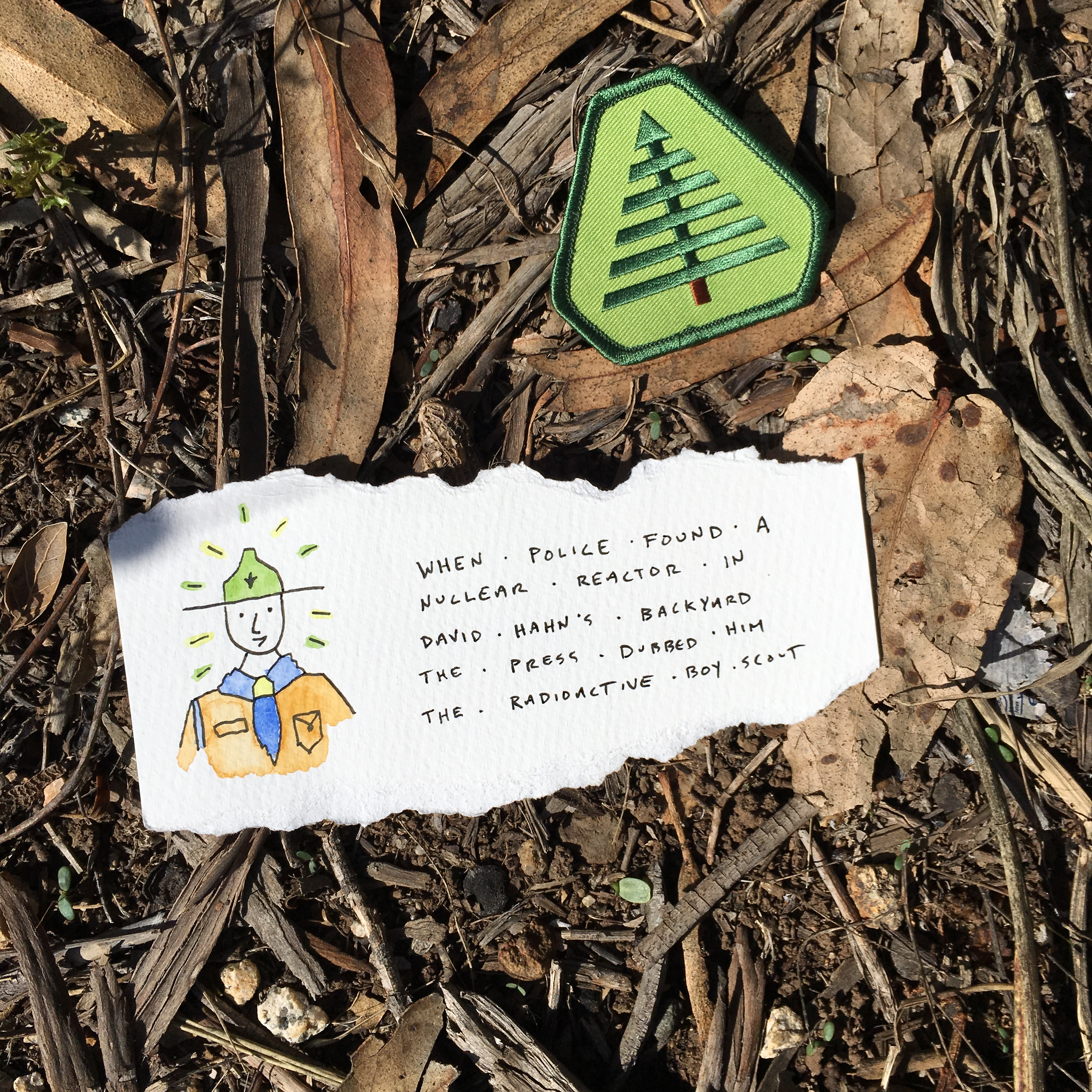
Picture illustrating David "Radioactive Boyscout" Hahn.

In 1999, a truck transporting 900 smoke detectors in France was reported to have caught fire; it is claimed that this led to a release of americium into the environment. In the U.S., the "Radioactive Boy Scout" David Hahn was able to buy thousands of smoke detectors at remainder prices and concentrate the americium from them.

There have been cases of humans being exposed to americium. The worst case was that of Harold McCluskey, who was exposed to an extremely high dose of americium-241 after an accident involving a glove box. He was subsequently treated with chelation therapy. It is likely that the medical care which he was given saved his life; despite similar biodistribution and toxicity to plutonium, the two radioactive elements have different solution-state chemistries. Americium is stable in the +3 oxidation state, while the +4 oxidation state of plutonium can form in the human body.

The most common isotope americium-241 decays with a half-life of 432 years to neptunium-237. In the long term, the issues discussed above for neptunium apply.

Americium released into the environment tends to remain in soil and water at relatively shallow depths and may be taken up by animals and plants during growth; shellfish such as shrimp take up americium-241 in their shells, and parts of grain plants can become contaminated by exposure. In a 2021 paper, J.D. Chaplin et al. reported advances in the diffusive gradients in thin films technique, which have provided a method to measure labile bioavailable americium in soils, as well as in freshwater and seawater.

== Curium ==
Atmospheric curium compounds are poorly soluble in common solvents and mostly adhere to soil particles. Soil analysis revealed about 4,000 times higher concentration of curium in the sandy soil particles than in water present in the soil pores. An even higher ratio of about 18,000 was measured in loam soils.

== Californium ==
Californium is fairly insoluble in water, but it adheres well to ordinary soil, and concentrations of it in the soil can be 500 times higher than in the water surrounding the soil particles.

== See also ==
- Uranium in the environment
- Radium in the environment
- Background radiation
- Radioecology
