= C. Bradley Thompson =

Clemson University faculty

C. Bradley Thompson (born 1959) is an American writer who is the BB&T Research Professor in the Department of Political Science and the executive director of the Clemson Institute for the Study of Capitalism. He received his Ph.D. at Brown University, where he studied under Gordon S. Wood. He was also a visiting scholar at Princeton and Harvard universities, and at the University of London. He also was a James Madison Program Garwood Visiting Fellow at Princeton University in 2004–05.

== Career ==
Thompson has lectured around the United States and on C-SPAN on topics including education reform, American history, Marxism, and natural law theory. He has also published essays on these topics in The Times Literary Supplement of London and The Objective Standard.

== Bibliography ==
=== Books ===
- Thompson, Bradley C. (1998). John Adams and the Spirit of Liberty. University Press of Kansas. ISBN 978-0700611812
- Thompson, Bradley C and Brook, Yaron. (2010). Neoconservatism: An Obituary for an Idea. Routledge. ISBN 978-1594518317
- Thompson, Bradley C. and Forster, Greg, editors (2011). Freedom and School Choice in American Education. Palgrave Macmillan. ISBN 978-0230112285
- Thompson, Bradley C. (2019). America’s Revolutionary Mind: A Moral History of the American Revolution and the Declaration That Defined It. Encounter Books. ISBN 978-1641770668
