= Plutopia =

Comparative history book

Plutopia: Nuclear Families, Atomic Cities, and the Great Soviet and American Plutonium Disasters
- Author: Kate Brown
- Language: English
- Subjects: Nuclear energy; Cold War
- Genre: Environmental history
- Published: 2013
- Publisher: Oxford University Press
- Publication place: United States
- Media type: Print
- Pages: 416
- Awards: John H. Dunning Prize; George Perkins Marsh Prize; Ellis W. Hawley Prize
- ISBN: 9780199855766

Plutopia: Nuclear Families, Atomic Cities, and the Great Soviet and American Plutonium Disasters is a 2013 book by American environmental historian Kate Brown. The book is a comparative history of the cities of Richland, in the northwest United States adjacent to the U.S. Department of Energy Hanford Site plutonium production area, and Ozersk, in Russia's southern Ural mountain region. These two cities were home to the world's first plutonium production sites, and in Plutopia Brown charts the environmental and social impacts of those sites on the residents of and the environment surrounding the two cities. Brown argues that the demands of plutonium production – both the danger of the physical process and the secrecy required in the Cold War context – led both US and Soviet officials to create "Plutopias," ideal communities to placate resident families in exchange for their cooperation and control over their bodies. This entailed creating significant state-run welfare programs along with high levels of consumerism in both places. However, each city witnessed what Brown terms "slow-motion disasters" via the slow, and usually controlled, release of high levels of radiation into their surrounding environments.

== Awards ==
Plutopia was awarded the 2014 George Perkins Marsh Prize from the American Society for Environmental History (ASEH) as the best book in environmental history and the 2014 Ellis W. Hawley Prize from the Organization of American Historians (OAH). It was also awarded the 2015 John H. Dunning Prize from the American Historical Association as the best book concerning American history.
