= Keith Wailoo =

American historian

- Born: Keith Andrew Wailoo
- Occupations: Historian; professor
- Title: Henry Putnam University Professor of History and Public Affairs
- Awards: Dan David Prize (2021)

Academic background
- Education: Yale University (BA); University of Pennsylvania (PhD)
- Website: keithwailoo.com

Keith Andrew Wailoo is an American historian. He is the Henry Putnam University Professor of History and Public Affairs and Chair of the Department of History at Princeton University. His research lies at the intersection of history and health policy, often focusing on the politics of healthcare, the development of drug policy, and the social implications of health policy. He was elected as a member of the American Academy of Arts and Sciences in 2021.

== Education ==
Wailoo received a PhD in the history and sociology of science from the University of Pennsylvania, and a bachelor's degree in chemical engineering from Yale University. Prior to arriving at Princeton, he taught at the University of North Carolina Chapel Hill, Harvard University, Rutgers University, and the Center for Advanced Study in the Behavioral Sciences.

In 2021, he was awarded the Dan David Prize.

== Publications ==
- Pushing Cool: Big Tobacco, Racial Marketing, and the Untold Story of the Menthol Cigarette (University of Chicago Press, 2021)
- Pain: A Political History (Johns Hopkins University Press, 2015)
- How Cancer Crossed the Color Line (Oxford University Press, 2011)
- Katrina's Imprint: Race and Vulnerability in America (Rutgers University Press, 2010)
- Three Shots at Prevention: The HPV Vaccine and the Politics of Medicine's Simple Solutions (Johns Hopkins University Press, 2010)
- The Troubled Dream of Genetic Medicine: Ethnicity and Innovation in Tay–Sachs, Cystic Fibrosis, Sickle Cell Disease (Johns Hopkins University Press, 2006)
- A Death Retold: Jesica Santillan, the Bungled Transplant, and Paradoxes of Medical Citizenship (University of North Carolina Press, 2006)
- Dying in the City of the Blues: Sickle Cell Anemia and the Politics of Race and Health (University of North Carolina Press, 2001)
- Drawing Blood: Technology and Disease Identity in Twentieth Century America (Johns Hopkins University Press, 1997)
