= Plutonyl =

The plutonyl ion is an oxycation of plutonium in the oxidation state +6, with the chemical formula PuO^{2+}_{2}. It is isostructural with the uranyl ion, compared to which it has a slightly shorter M–O bond. It is easily reduced to plutonium(III). The plutonyl ion forms many complexes, particularly with ligands that have oxygen donor atoms. Plutonyl salts are important in nuclear fuel reprocessing.

== Chemical properties ==
The chemistry of the plutonyl ion resembles the chemistry of the uranyl ion very closely. Both ions are linear with the metal atom midway between the two oxygen atoms. Many compounds of the two ions are isostructural. The ν_{Pu–O} asymmetric stretching frequency is some 20 cm^{−1} lower, at ca. 910 cm^{−1}, in complexes with the same ligand set. From this it can be inferred that the Pu–O bond is only a little weaker than the U–O bond. The electronic structures are also similar.

In aqueous solution there are some differences in hydrolysis behaviour, not only in the log β* values (definition of β*) but in nature of the polymeric species that can be formed. In the table below, 1,2 stoichiometry means a species with one actinyl ion and two hydroxide ions, etc. This is one of the few instances of notable differences between plutonyl and uranyl.

log β* hydrolysis constant values
Stoichiometry	uranyl	plutonyl
1,1	−5.45	−5.76
1,2	−5.8	−11.69
2,2		−7.79
2,4		−19.3
3,4	−12	
3,5	−16	

Distinct optical absorbance bands at 842 and 845 nm were observed for the mononuclear and dinuclear hydrolysis species. Hydrolysis of plutonyl is important for an understanding of pollution of natural waters.

Another significant difference is that plutonyl is a much stronger oxidizing agent than uranyl. The standard reduction potentials for aqueous solutions are shown in the next table.

Standard reduction potentials /V
Couple	uranyl	plutonyl
MO^{2+}_{2}/M^{4+}	0.38	1.04
M^{4+}/M^{3+}	−0.52	1.01

Conversely, plutonyl is more easily reduced than uranyl. This difference is utilized in the separation of plutonium from uranium in the PUREX process, as described below.

The plutonyl ion is always associated with other ligands. The most common arrangement is for the so-called equatorial ligands to lie in a plane perpendicular to the O–Pu–O line and passing through the plutonium atom. With four ligands, as in [PuO_{2}Cl_{4}]^{2−} the plutonium has a distorted octahedral environment, with a square of ligand atoms in the equatorial plane. In plutonyl nitrate, PuO_{2}(NO_{3})_{2}2H_{2}O, as in uranyl nitrate there is a hexagon of six ligand atoms in the equatorial plane, four oxygen atoms from bidentate nitrate ions and two oxygens from the water molecules. Plutonyl nitrate, like uranyl nitrate, is soluble in diethyl ether. The complex that is extracted has no electrical charge. This is the most important factor in making the complex soluble in organic solvents. Also the water molecules are replaced by ether molecules. Replacing the water molecules that are bound to the plutonyl ion in aqueous solution by a second, hydrophobic, ligand increases the solubility of the neutral complex in the organic solvent. This has been called a synergic effect.

The solubility of plutonyl nitrate in organic solvents is utilized in the PUREX process. Plutonyl nitrate is extracted with tributyl phosphate, (CH_{3}CH_{2}CH_{2}CH_{2}O)_{3}PO, TBP, as the preferred second ligand, and kerosene the preferred organic solvent. It is recovered by treatment with aqueous ferrous sulfamate which selectively reduces the plutonium to the +3 oxidation state in the aqueous solution, leaving the uranium in the organic phase. Plutonyl complex chemistry is an active research area, for dealing with environmental contamination.

== See also ==
- Plutonium in the environment
