= Drew R. McCoy =

American historian

Drew. R. McCoy is an American historian and specialist in American political and intellectual history. McCoy was educated at Cornell University (A.B. 1971) and the University of Virginia (M.A. 1973, Ph.D. 1976). He has taught American history at the University of Texas at Austin, Harvard University, and, most recently, Clark University, where he is currently the Jacob and Frances Hiatt Professor of History. His focus is on early American history from the colonial era through the Civil War era of the mid-nineteenth century. His two books cover a general study of political economy in Revolutionary and Early National America, and a partial biography of James Madison that, by focusing on his retirement, explores the transmission of republican values across generations in nineteenth-century America. He was awarded the John H. Dunning Prize by the American Historical Association in 1989, and the New England Historical Association Book Award.

== Publications ==
- The Elusive Republic: Political Economy in Jeffersonian America. University of North Carolina Press. 1996 [1980]. ISBN 978-0-8078-4616-2.
- The Last of the Fathers: James Madison and the Republican Legacy. Cambridge University Press. 1989. ISBN 978-0-521-36407-2.
