= Ralph Ketcham =

American academic (1927 – 2017)

Ralph Louis Ketcham (October 29, 1927 – April 26, 2017) was an American academic. For almost 60 years, he served as a professor of history and political science at Syracuse University. Ketcham's academic focus was on political theory and the American founding with an emphasis on James Madison.

== Early life and education ==
Born on October 28, 1927, in Berea, Ohio, Ketcham was raised in New Hartford, New York. His parents were Sherman and Laura Murphy Ketcham. In 1959, he married Julia Stillwell. The couple had two children: Benjamin and Laura Lee.

Ketcham attended the United States Coast Guard Academy, Allegheny College, and Colgate University and earned his PhD in American Studies at Syracuse University in 1956.

== Career ==
After obtaining his PhD, Ketcham taught briefly at the University of Chicago and at Yale. In 1963, he joined Syracuse's Maxwell School of Citizenship and Public Affairs, which specializes in the social sciences, public policy, public administration, and international relations.

Though he retired in 1997, Ketcham continued to write and to teach an annual graduate symposium on the foundations of American thought.

== Bibliography ==
He was the author of a dozen books, including:

- Benjamin Franklin. New York: Washington Square Press, 1966
- James Madison: A Biography, 1971, ISBN 0813912652
- From Colony to Country: The Revolution in American Thought, 1750-1820. New York: Macmillan, 1974, ISBN 0025629301
- Presidents Above Party: The First American Presidency, 1789-1829, 1984, ISBN 0807815829
- Individualism and Public Life: A Modern Dilemma. Oxford: Blackwell, 1987, ISBN 0631157735
- Framed for Posterity: The Enduring Philosophy of the Constitution, 1993
- The Idea of Democracy in the Modern Era. Lawrence, Kan: University Press of Kansas, 2004
- Madisons at Montpelier: Reflections on the founding couple. University of Virginia Press, 2011, ISBN 0813928117
- Public-Spirited Citizenship: Leadership and Good Government in the United States, 2015
- With Sean Runnette. The Anti-Federalist Papers and the Constitutional Convention Debates. Old Saybrook, Conn: Tantor Media, 2019, ISBN 0451528840
  - translated into Spanish as Escritos antifederalistas y debates de la convención constitucional de EE.UU. Barcelona: Hacer, 1996

Ketcham also edited books of selected writings by Benjamin Franklin and James Madison.

== Honors ==
- 1979 – Inaugural recipient of the Chancellor's Citation for Outstanding Academic Achievement
- 1987 – Selected as national professor of the year by the Council for the Advancement and Support of Education
- 1999 – Honorary degree from Syracuse University
- 2003 – George Arents Medal for career achievement
