= William Gardner (former slave) =

American formerly enslaved merchant

- Born: Billey c. 1759; Montpelier, Virginia
- Died: 1795 at sea, en route to New Orleans
- Occupations: Indentured servant Merchant's agent Merchant seaman Shipping agent
- Known for: enslaved person who grew up with an American founder and was later freed
- Spouse: Henrietta
- Father: Tony

William Gardner (born Billey, c. 1759 - 1795) was an enslaved man born into the family of James Madison in Montpelier, Virginia, to a man likely named Tony. Madison's father gave Gardner to the young Madison as a companion when Madison was a child.

Named Billey, Gardner was with Madison from 1780 to 1783 in Philadelphia for the Continental Congress. Madison considered selling Gardner to buy philosophy books in 1782, the same year that Gardner attempted to run away. As Gardner had previously tried to get away, opposed returning to Montpelier, had been actively exposed to ideas about liberty and populations of free black people, and whose servitude was legally questionable, Madison opted to sell Gardner into indentured servitude for a seven-year term.

Upon the end of his term, Gardner became a merchant's agent who worked for notable American colonial figures, including Madison and Thomas Jefferson. As a free man, Gardner married Henrietta and started a family. His wife worked as a launderer.

Gardner's route to freedom highlighted a problem among American Revolutionary War supporters. It demonstrated a fear of enslaved and Native American uprisings and mass attempts at running away as a result of the colonies' rebellion from Great Britain, which was based on a philosophy that men who are not represented in their governance are enslaved (No taxation without representation).

== Early life ==
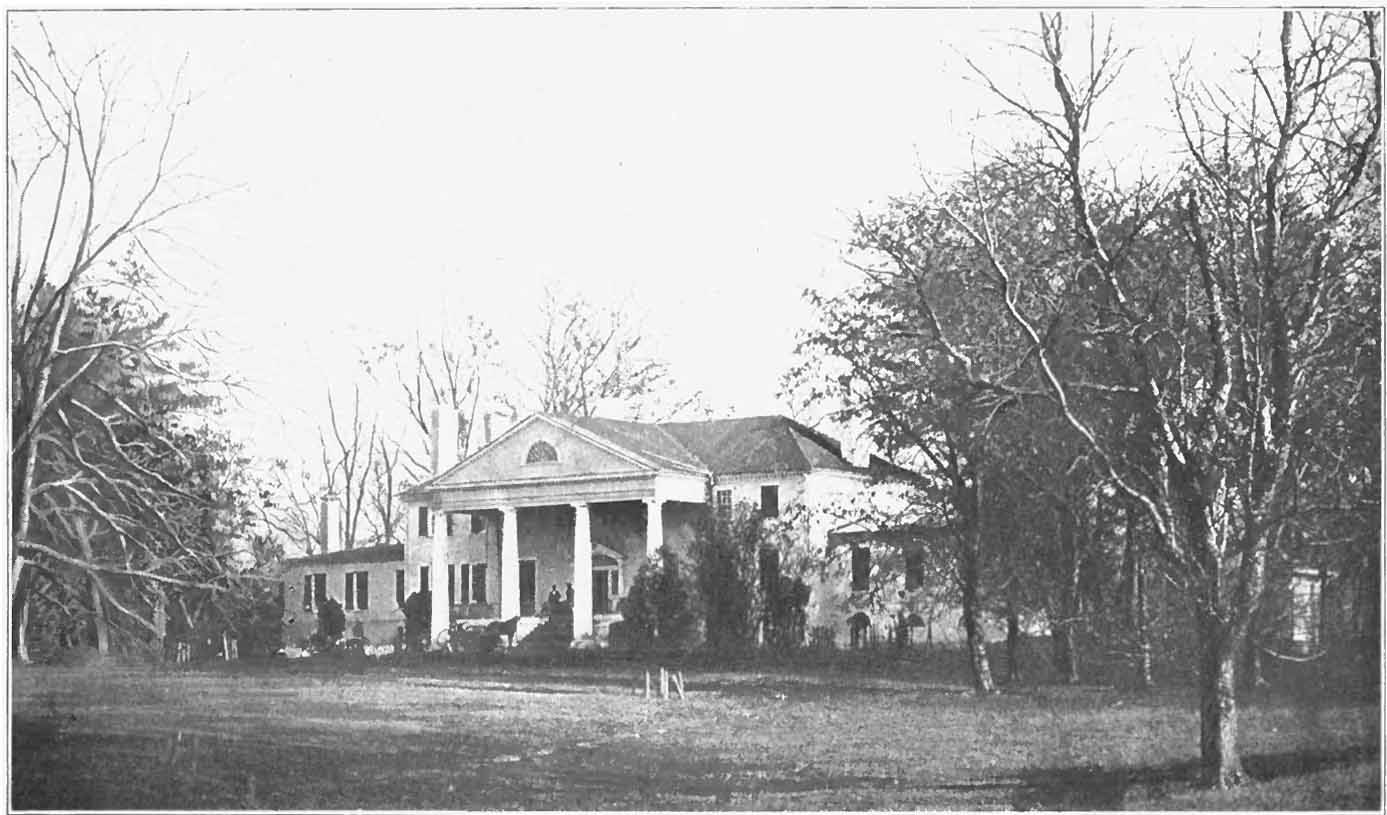
Photograph of the former home of United States President James Madison in Montpelier, Piedmont, Virginia, where William Gardner was born.

Gardner was born in 1759 in Montpelier, Virginia, enslaved by the family of James Madison, who was an 8-year-old at the time. He was called Billey. His father might have been an enslaved man named Tony. James Madison Sr. gave Gardner to Madison, and Gardner became a constant companion to Madison in his youth. When Madison went to Princeton University, Gardner was left behind and another slave, Sawney, accompanied him instead.

== Legal status of Gardner's slave status ==
In 1777, the Pennsylvania General Assembly passed An Act for the Gradual Abolition of Slavery, the first law of its kind in the Western Hemisphere. The law provided that after March 1, 1780, any child born to an enslaved woman would be considered free after twenty-eight years of enslavement. The law also banned the sale of enslaved people in Pennsylvania. People could only be sold for set terms of no longer than seven years. Two years later, in 1780, Virginia's legislature also passed a law to allow Virginian enslavers to emancipate the people they enslaved.

== Continental Congress ==
Gardner traveled with James Madison to Philadelphia in 1780, where Madison was serving in the Second Continental Congress. Madison was short on cash in 1782 but wanted to acquire philosophy books, including Thomas Hobbes's Leviathan. In trying to acquire these books, he considered selling Gardner to pay for them. Pennsylvania laws prohibited this. That year, Gardner also attempted to escape his enslavement but was recaptured.

== Emancipation ==
Gardner was 23 years old in 1783 when Madison was preparing to depart Philadelphia as the Continental Congress ended. Gardner had been with Madison for three and a half years in the city; he was exposed to liberty, freedom, and philosophy and he saw free Black people daily. Gardner did not want to return to Virginia. Madison and his father worried that they could not force the enslaved Gardner back to Virginia because he could potentially foment rebellion. Madison said in a letter to his father, "I have judged it most prudent not to force Billey back to Montpelier, Virginia even if it could be done." Madison went on to say, "I am persuaded his mind is too thoroughly tainted to be a companion for fellow slaves in Virginia." Madison considered options related to Gardner, including smuggling him out of Pennsylvania and then selling him where slavery was legal, such as the south or the Caribbean. But in a letter to his father, Madison expressed trepidation regarding this, saying he could not "think of punishing him by transportation merely for coveting that liberty for which we have paid the price of so much blood, and have proclaimed so often to be the right, and worthy of pursuit, of every human being." Madison ultimately decided to sell Gardner into seven years of indentured servitude. Had Madison not done so, Gardner would likely have earned his freedom through Pennsylvania's emancipation laws.

Virginians in Philadelphia, including Martha Washington, would likely have been aware of Madison's dilemma regarding Gardner's emancipation. These situations worried many enslavers, who feared enslaved and Native American rebellions and their mass attempts at escaping as a result of the Colonies' rebellion with Great Britain, was based on a philosophy that men who are not represented in their governance are enslaved.

== Post-emancipation life ==
Following his sale, Billey changed his name to William Gardner. At the end of his period of indentured servitude, Gardner became a merchant's agent, shipping agent, and merchant seaman. As a merchant's agent, Gardner would handle business for several well known historical figures, including James Madison and Thomas Jefferson. When Madison needed to buy some plows, Jefferson organized the purchase by giving Gardner $34.70 to acquire them. Gardner married a woman named Henrietta and raised a family in Philadelphia. Later, Gardner's wife would work as a clothes launder and would clean Thomas Jefferson's clothes weekly when he was in the city. Gardner never returned to Montpelier.
