= Maurine Beasley =

American academic

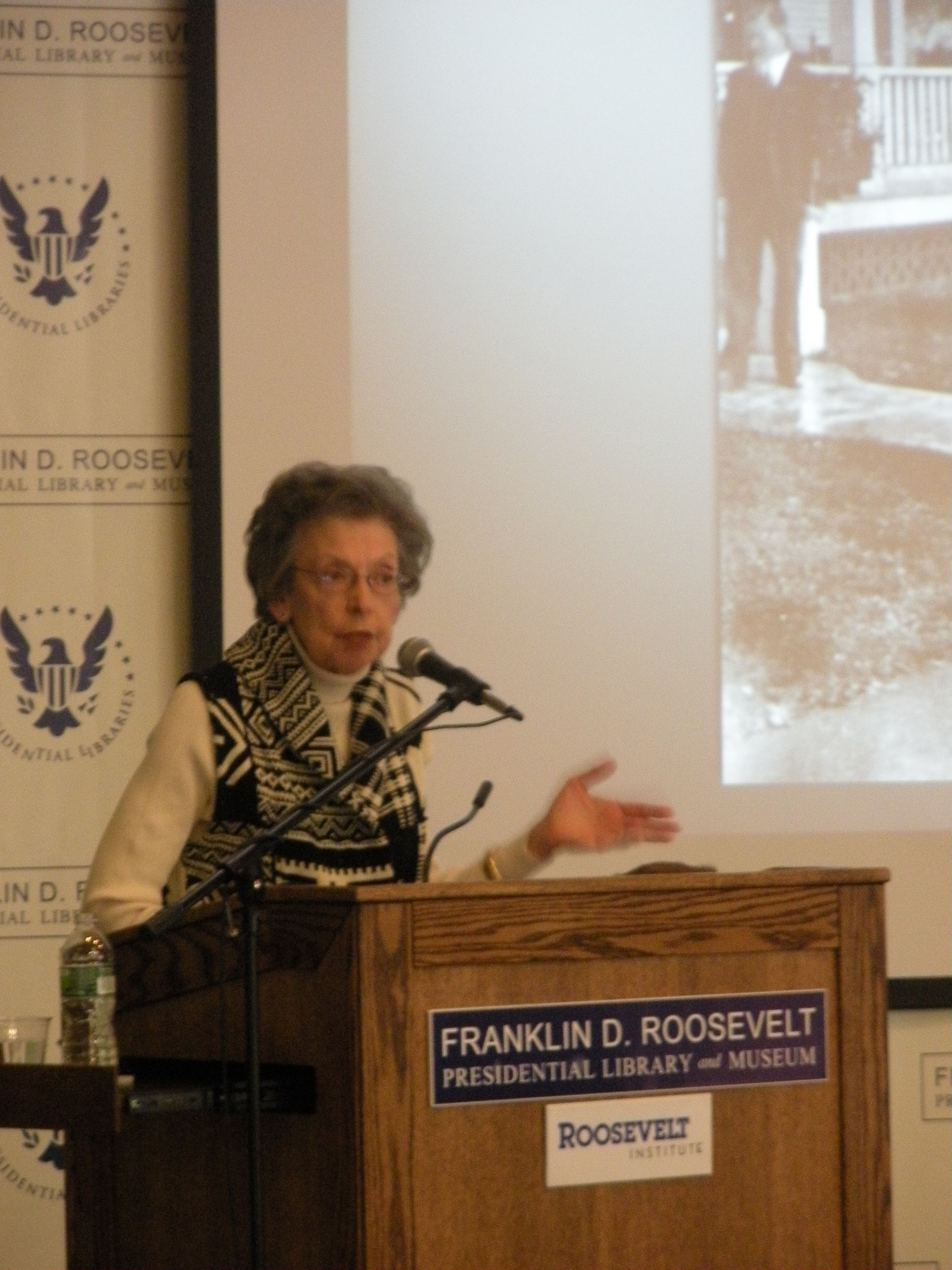
- Maurine Beasley in 2011
- Born: January 28, 1936 (age 90); Sedalia, Missouri
- Education: University of Missouri
- Occupation: Professor emerita of Journalism
- Employer: University of Maryland, College Park
- Known for: Research on the history of women in journalism and the life of Eleanor Roosevelt

Maurine Beasley (born 28 January 1936) is professor emerita of Journalism at the Philip Merrill College of Journalism, University of Maryland, College Park. She is known for her studies on the history of women in journalism, especially during early periods when they were poorly represented in the field, and for her research concerning the life and work of Eleanor Roosevelt.

== Career ==
Beasley was born in Sedalia, Missouri. Beasley earned her B.A. in History, her B.J. Journalism and a certificate in Secondary English Teaching from the University of Missouri in Columbia. Beasley was one of the top performing students in her class—however, she was put off journalism by sexist hiring practices, turning instead to teaching in Grand Rapids, Michigan. In 1959, she got her first job at a newspaper, working for six weeks at the Kalamazoo Gazette. Through personal contacts, she then moved to The Kansas City Star where she became education editor until leaving in 1962.

She pursued her master's degree at the Columbia University Graduate School of Journalism, where she ranked third in the class. At Columbia, she received a Pulitzer Traveling Fellowship that allowed her to travel in Europe and obtain a certificate in British History from the University of Edinburgh in 1964. Beasley subsequently took a job as a staff writer at The Washington Post. Encountering the customary prejudice against women reporters of the day, she considers her 10 years at The Post an unhappy period of her life, eventually leaving in 1973. After resigning, Beasley finished her Ph.D. in American Civilization from George Washington University, entitled "The First Women Washington Correspondents", supervised by Letitia Woods Brown.

Beasley started teaching as a part-time instructor at the University of Maryland College of Journalism in 1974 and was promoted to assistant professor in 1975. She was viewed as the "token woman" of the faculty, and indeed was not joined on the tenure track by any other women at the department until about a decade later. She advanced to associate professor in 1980 and to full professor in 1987, and was an affiliate faculty member in the departments of American Studies and Women’s Studies. After retiring in 2009, she returned to the college, now named the Philip Merrill College of Journalism, for five years, serving as interim graduate director in 2012-13. At Maryland, she served as the primary dissertation advisor for 27 Ph.D. students, 10 of whom won national awards for their work in journalism history.

She was a founding member of the American Journalism Historians Association (AJHA), and was elected president in 1989 for one year. It awarded her the Sidney Kobre Award for Lifetime Achievement in Journalism History in 1997, the highest honor the society bestows. She also served as president of the Association for Education in Journalism and Mass Communication (AEJMC), the largest organization of academic journalism educators, in 1994 and led the first delegation of journalism educators from the United States to China to study journalism schools there. The AEJMC awarded Beasley the 2008 Eleanor Blum Distinguished Service to Research Award. In 2020, she was the first recipient of the Donald Shaw Senior Scholar Award from the AEJMC History Division.

Beasley received a Fulbright grant in 2020 to teach journalism for a semester at Jinan University in Guangzhou, China. She also was a visiting lecturer/scholar at Sophia University in Tokyo in 2020. In other activities, Beasley was elected president of the Washington professional chapter of the Society of Professional Journalists (SPJ) in 1990 and subsequently served on the national board.

== Research ==
Beasley has written about the history of women in journalism and the public spotlight, calling attention to the relationship between Washington women reporters and coverage of First Ladies. She has been interviewed by Book TV about her publications on these topics. She was consulted and interviewed about the role of female war correspondents as well as "women's pages" in newspapers for the documentary "No Place For A Woman," about women reporting on World War II. Her book "Taking Their Place: Documentary History of Women and Journalism" 2nd Edition (co-written with Sheila Gibbons) was awarded a Textbook Excellence Award in 2004 by the Text and Academic Authors Association. In 2013, her book "Women of the Washington Press" won the Frank Luther Mott/Kappa Tau Alpha Award for the best-researched scholarly book on journalism/mass communication published in 2012. It also was a finalist for the Tankard Book Award sponsored by AEJMC for a book that “broke new ground.”

She is a scholar of Eleanor Roosevelt, and wrote "Eleanor Roosevelt and the Media" (1987), "Eleanor Roosevelt: Transformative First Lady" (2010) and co-edited "The Eleanor Roosevelt Encyclopedia" (2000). The latter was selected as a top reference book of 2001 by the reviewers Booklist. She has been a grantee of The Roosevelt Institute in Hyde Park, New York.

== Awards ==
- 1994 Distinguished Service to Local Journalism Award, Washington chapter, Society of Professional Journalists.
- 1997 Sidney Kobre Award for Lifetime Achievement in Journalism History from the AJHA.
- 1999 Distinguished Senior Scholar by the American Association of University Women.
- 2000 Columbia University Graduate School of Journalism Alumni Award.
- 2001 One of the best reference books of the year by Booklist for The Eleanor Roosevelt Encyclopedia.
- 2004 Textbook Excellence Award by the Text and Academic Authors Association for Taking Their Place: Documentary History of Women and Journalism 2nd Edition.
- 2004 University of Missouri Faculty-Alumni Award.
- 2008 Eleanor Blum Distinguished Service to Research Award by the AEJMC.
- 2013 Kappa Tau Alpha/Frank Luther Mott Award for the best-researched book on journalism/mass communications.
- 2013 Women in Media Award, Women’s Institute for Freedom of the Press, Washington, D.C.
- 2020 Donald Shaw Senior Scholar Award, AEJMC History Division.
