= List of history awards =

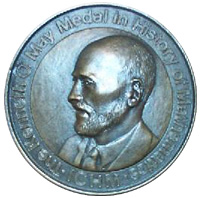
Kenneth O. May Prize in the history of mathematics

This list of history awards covers notable awards given to people, a group of people, or institutions, for their contribution to the study of history. It is organized by region. The entries name the prize and sponsoring organization, give notes on the purpose or criteria, and where available give the period in which the prize was awarded. Typically a prize is first awarded in the year after it is established, and applies to work published in the previous year.

== Americas ==
=== Canada ===
Award	Sponsor	Notes	Awarded
CHA Best Scholarly Book in Canadian History Prize	Canadian Historical Association	Annual award for "the most significant contribution to an understanding of the Canadian past"	since 1977
Cundill History Prize	McGill University	Literature award for history	since 2008
François-Xavier Garneau Medal	Canadian Historical Association	Awarded every five years for an outstanding Canadian contribution to historical research	since 1980
Frank Watson Book Prize	University of Guelph	Awarded every two years for "the best monograph, edited collection and/or book-length original work on Scottish History published in the previous two years."	since 1993
J. B. Tyrrell Historical Medal	Royal Society of Canada	Outstanding work in the history of Canada. Named in honour of Joseph Tyrrell	since 1928

=== Latin America ===
Award	Sponsor	Notes
Chilean National History Award	Government of Chile	History of Chile (since 1974)
Orden del Pop	Universidad Francisco Marroquín	Guatemala's cultural heritage (since 1998)

=== United States ===
Award	Sponsor	Notes	Awarded
Sacknoff Prize for Space History	SPACE 3.0 Foundation	Encourage original research by university students in the field of space history.	since 2011
Leadership in History Awards	American Association for State and Local History	The awards recognize projects, programs, publications, and individuals that set standards in collecting, preserving, and interpreting state and local history.	since 1945
Herbert Baxter Adams Prize	American Historical Association	Distinguished first book by a young scholar in the field of European history	since 1905
AJHA Book Award	American Journalism Historians Association	Best book in media history	
AJHA Teaching Awards	American Journalism Historians Association	Excellence in teaching journalism and mass communication history	
Gold Medal Award for Distinguished Archaeological Achievement	Archaeological Institute of America	Archaeology	since 1965
Bancroft Prize	Columbia University	Diplomacy or the history of the Americas	since 1948
K. Jack Bauer Award	North American Society for Oceanic History	Life-time contributions to the field of maritime history	
AHA Prize in European International History	American Historical Association	Best book in European international history from 1895 to the present	since 1923
Bentley Book Prize	World History Association	First awarded as the World History Association Book Prize. Name changed in 2012	since 1999
Berkshire Conference of Women Historians Book Prize	Berkshire Conference of Women Historians	Two prizes, one for work that deals with the history of women, gender, and/or sexuality, one for a first book in any field of history that does not focus on the history of women, gender, and/or sexuality.	since 1990
Beveridge Award	American Historical Association	Best English-language book on United States, Canada or Latin America history from 1492 to the present	since 1939
Ray Allen Billington Prize	Organization of American Historians	Best book about American frontier history, including all of North and South America, all post-1492 pioneer experiences, and comparisons between American frontiers and others around the world	since 1981
Margaret A. Blanchard Dissertation Prize	American Journalism Historians Association	Best doctoral dissertation dealing with mass communication history	
James L. Clifford Prize	American Society for Eighteenth-Century Studies	Best article in 18th-century studies	Since 1978
Cornplanter Medal	Cayuga County Historical Society	Iroquois studies	1904-1979
Merle Curti Award	Organization of American Historians	Best book in American social and/or American intellectual history	Since 1978
Millia Davenport Publication Award	Costume Society of America	recognizes and promotes excellence in the publication of costume, dress, appearance, and fashion related scholarship.	
Dexter Award	American Chemical Society	History of chemistry (now the HIST award)	1956–2001
Frederick Douglass Book Prize	Gilder Lehrman Institute of American History	Most outstanding non-fiction book in English on the subject of slavery, abolition or antislavery movements	since 1999
John H. Dunning Prize	American Historical Association	Best book in history related to the United States	since 1929
Sidney M. Edelstein Award	American Chemical Society	History of chemistry (now the HIST award)	2002–2009
Eugene M. Emme Astronautical Literature Award	American Astronautical Society History Committee	Truly outstanding book serving public understanding about the positive impact of astronautics upon society. The award is in honor of Eugene M. Emme, NASA's first historian	-
John K. Fairbank Prize	American Historical Association	Outstanding book in the history of China proper, Vietnam, Chinese Central Asia, Mongolia, Manchuria, Korea, or Japan, substantially after 1800	since 1969
Frank Gibney Award	Journal of American-East Asian Relations	Article written by graduate student in any field of American-East Asian relations	since 2008
Friend of History Award	Organization of American Historians	For an individual, who is not a professional historian, or an institution or organization for outstanding support for the pursuit of historical research, for the public presentation of history, or for the work of the OAH	since 2005
Leo Gershoy Award	American Historical Association	Best publication in English dealing with the history of Europe in the 17th and 18th centuries	since 1977
Louis Gottschalk Prize	American Society for Eighteenth-Century Studies	Outstanding historical or critical study on the 18th century	since 1976
Gilder Lehrman Prize in Military History	Harry Frank Guggenheim Foundation	Best book on military history in the English-speaking world. Before 2016 known as the Guggenheim-Lehrman Prize in Military History	since 2014
HIST Award for Outstanding Achievement in the History of Chemistry	American Chemical Society	History of chemistry	since 2013
J. C. Harrington Award in Historical Archaeology	Society for Historical Archaeology	For a life-time of contributions to the discipline [archaeology] centered on scholarship	since 1982
Hattendorf Prize	Naval War College	Original research that contributes to a deeper historical understanding of the broad context and interrelationships involved in the roles, contributions, limitations, and uses of the sea services in history	since 2011
Ellis W. Hawley Prize	Organization of American Historians	Best historical study of the political economy, politics, or institutions of the United States, in its domestic or international affairs, from the American Civil War to the present	since 1997
Alice Davis Hitchcock Award	Society of Architectural Historians	Most distinguished work of scholarship in the history of architecture	since 1949
Commodore Dudley W. Knox Naval History Lifetime Achievement Award	Naval Historical Foundation	Recognize the lifetime achievements of historians of the United States Navy	since 2013
Sidney Kobre Award for Lifetime Achievement in Journalism History	American Journalism Historians Association	History of journalism in the United States	since 1986
Richard W. Leopold Prize	Organization of American Historians	Best history book on U.S. federal government agencies, U.S. foreign policies, U.S. military affairs, or biographies of government officials	since 1984
Lawrence W. Levine Award	Organization of American Historians	Best book in American cultural history	since 2008
Suzanne J. Levinson Prize	History of Science Society	Book in the history of the life sciences and natural history	since 2006
Wesley Logan Prize	American Historical Association; Association for the Study of African American Life	Outstanding book in African diaspora history	since 1994
John Lyman Book Awards	North American Society for Oceanic History	Excellence in published books making a major contribution to the study and understanding of maritime and naval history	since 1995
Mark Lynton History Prize	Nieman Foundation for Journalism; Columbia University Graduate School of Journalism	History, on any subject, that best combines intellectual or scholarly distinction with felicity of expression	since 1999
Alfred Thayer Mahan Award for Literary Achievement	Navy League of the United States	Notable literary contribution that has advanced the knowledge of the importance of sea power in the United States	since 1957
George L. Mosse Prize	American Historical Association	European History	since 2000
George Perkins Marsh Prize	American Society for Environmental History	Best book in environmental history	since 1989
Gustavus Myers Outstanding Book Award	Gustavus Myers Center for the Study of Bigotry and Human Rights	Works which extend understanding of the root causes of bigotry	1985–2008
New-York Historical Society book prizes	New-York Historical Society	American History Book Prize; New-York Historical Society Children's History Book Prize; Gilder Lehrman Prize for Military History	
National Council on Public History book prize	National Council on Public History	Best book about or growing out of public history published within the previous two calendar years	since 2005
Francis Parkman Prize	Society of American Historians	Best book in American history	since 1957
Pulitzer Prize for History	Columbia University	Distinguished book about the history of the United States	since 1917
James A. Rawley Prize	American Historical Association	Best book in Atlantic history	since 1990
James A. Rawley Prize	Organization of American Historians	Best book on race relations in the United States	since 1999
Rome Prize	American Academy in Rome	Italian studies	since 1896
Theodore and Franklin D. Roosevelt Prize in Naval History	Navy League of the United States; Roosevelt Institute; Theodore Roosevelt Association	Naval History	since 1986
Margaret W. Rossiter History of Women in Science Prize	History of Science Society	Outstanding book or article on the history of women in science	since 1987
George Sarton Medal	History of Science Society	Historian of science from the international community distinguished for a lifetime of scholarly achievement	since 1955
John Gilmary Shea Prize	American Catholic Historical Association	Contribution to knowledge of the history of the Catholic Church	since 1945
Philip Taft Labor History Book Award	Cornell University School of Industrial and Labor Relations	Books relating to labor history of the United States	since 1978
Frederick Jackson Turner Award	Organization of American Historians	Author's first book on American history	since 1959
Abbot Payson Usher Prize	Society for the History of Technology	Best scholarly work on the history of technology published ... under the auspices of the Society	since 1961
Robert M. Utley Book Award	Western History Association	Best book on military history of the frontier and western North America from prehistory through the 20th century	since 2003
Watumull Prize	American Historical Association	Best book on the history of India	1945–1982
Justin Winsor Prize (history)	American Historical Association	History in the Western Hemisphere	1896–1938
Justin Winsor Prize (library)	American Library Association	Best library history essay	since 1978
Barbara and David Zalaznick Book Prize in American History	New-York Historical Society	Adult non-fiction book on American history or biography	since 2006

== Asia ==
Country	Award	Sponsor	Notes
Iran	Ashura Year Book Award	Debal Khazaei Foundation	Distinguished merit in the field of Ashura literature
Iran	Holy Defense Year Book Award	Government of Iran	Distinguished merit in the fields of Resistance Literature
Iran	Jalal Al-e Ahmad Literary Awards	Government of Iran	Best Iranian authors in history and documentation
Iran	Saadi Literary Award	Government of Iran	Distinguished merit in the fields of Persian literature
Israel	Dan David Prize	Dan David Foundation	Outstanding scholarship in the study of the past
Singapore	Singapore History Prize	National University of Singapore	Honours works that delve into the history of Singapore

== Europe ==
Country	Award	Sponsor	Notes
Austria	Francis Stephen Award	Austrian Society of 18th-Century Studies	18th century or the Habsburg monarchy (since 2000)
Belgium	CINOA Prize	CINOA	Art history since 1977
Finland	Vuoden historiateos	Historian Ystäväin Liitto	Work of history which has advanced historical understanding with particular distinction (since 1973)
France	Grand prix Gobert	Académie française	Most eloquent piece of history of France (since 1834)
France	Prix Guizot	Académie française	General history (since 1994)
France	Prix Marcel Pollitzer	Association des écrivains combattants	Work of history, preferably a biography (since 1953)
Germany	Kenneth O. May Prize	International Commission on the History of Mathematics	History of mathematics internationally (since 1989)
Germany	Prize for Military History	Federal Ministry of Defence (Germany)	Military history and history of military technology (since 1992)
Italy	Acqui Award of History	Department of Culture, Acqui Terme City Council	Remembering 1943 victims of the Acqui Military Division 1943
Italy	Premio Friuli Storia	Associazione Friuli Storia	History books for a general readership (since 2013)
Latvia; Lithuania	Balts' Award	Ministries of Foreign Affairs, Latvia and Lithuania	Latvian-Lithuanian culture, history and language (since 2018)
Norway	Holberg Prize	Storting	Work in the arts, humanities, social sciences, law and theology (since 2004)
United Kingdom	Archaeology Awards	Current Archaeology	Achievements in the field of archaeology (since 2009)
United Kingdom	T. S. Ashton Prize	Economic History Society	Best article accepted for publication in The Economic History Review (since 1972)
United Kingdom	Alan Ball Local History Awards	Library Services Trust	Local history publishing (since 1980s)
United Kingdom	Katharine Briggs Folklore Award	The Folklore Society	Promote the study of folklore and improve the standard of folklore publications in Britain and Ireland (from 1982)
United Kingdom	Caird Medal	National Maritime Museum	Individual who has done conspicuously important work in the field of the Museum's interests... (since 1984)
United Kingdom	Julian Corbett Prize in Naval History	University of London	Original research in the field of naval history (since 1926)
United Kingdom	Duff Cooper Prize	Pol Roger	Best work of history, biography, political science or poetry, published in English or French (since 1956)
United Kingdom	Gladstone Prize	Royal Historical Society	History book published in Britain on any topic which is not primarily British history (since 1997)
United Kingdom	Grote Prize	University of London	Notable research in Ancient history (since 1982)
United Kingdom	Hessell-Tiltman Prize	PEN International	Best work of non-fiction of historical content up to and including World War II (since 2002)
United Kingdom	Kenyon Medal	British Academy	Work in the field of classical studies and archaeology (since 1957)
United Kingdom	Longman-History Today Awards	Longman and History Today	Promote the study, publication and accessibility of history to a wide audience (since 2007)
United Kingdom	Mountbatten Maritime Prize	Maritime Foundation	Distinguished publication that has made a significant contribution to the maritime history of the United Kingdom (since 2000)
United Kingdom	Murray Prize for History	Society of Antiquaries of Scotland	Biennial prize in recognition of original research on the history of Scotland in the medieval to Early Modern periods accepted for publication in the Proceedings of the Society of Antiquaries of Scotland or Scottish Archaeological Internet Reports. (since 2013)
United Kingdom	Saltire Society Literary Awards	Saltire Society	Books which are either by living authors of Scottish descent or residing in Scotland, or deal with the work or life of a Scot or with a Scottish question, event or situation (since 1937)
United Kingdom	Templer Medal	Society for Army Historical Research	Annual prize for the best book on the history of the British Army (since 1982)
United Kingdom	Thirlwall Prize	University of Cambridge	British history or literature with original research (since 1884)
United Kingdom	The Whitfield Prize	Royal Historical Society	British or Irish history, author's first history work (since 1976)
United Kingdom	Wolfson History Prize	Wolfson Foundation	Popular history writing (since 1972)

== Oceania ==
=== Australia ===
Award	Sponsor	Notes	Founded
Frank Broeze Memorial Maritime History Prize	Australian Association for Maritime History; Australian National Maritime Museum	Maritime history relating to or impacting on Australia	
WK Hancock Prize	Australian Historical Association; Macquarie University	History book	2004
Allan Martin Award	Australian National University; Australian Historical Association	History of Australia	2004
New South Wales Premier's History Awards	State Library of New South Wales	Distinguished achievement in the interpretation of history	1997
Chief Minister's Northern Territory Book History Awards	Northern Territory Library	History of the Northern Territory of Australia	2004
Prime Minister's Prize for Australian History	Prime Minister of Australia	Significant contribution to understanding of Australian history	2006
Victorian Community History Awards	Government of Victoria (Australia)	Preservation of the State's history and excellence in historical research	1998

== See also ==
- Lists of awards
