= Sidney Kobre Award for Lifetime Achievement in Journalism History =

The Sidney Kobre Award for Lifetime Achievement in Journalism History is an award for achievement in the study of the history of journalism in the United States, awarded by the American Journalism Historians Association to "individuals with an exemplary record of sustained achievement in journalism history through teaching, research, professional activities, or other contributions to the field of journalism history." The award is not given every year.

== Recipients ==
- 2026: Michael Conway, Indiana University
- 2025: Patrick Cox, University of Texas at Austin
- 2024: W. Joseph Campbell, American University
- 2023: John Maxwell Hamilton, Louisiana State
- 2022: Janice Hume, University of Georgia
- 2021: Julie Williams, Samford
- 2020: Ford Risley, Pennsylvania State University
- 2019: Debra van Tuyll, Augusta University
- 2018: Eugenia M. Palmegiano, St. Peter's University
- 2017: Kitty Endres, University of Akron
- 2016: Jean Folkerts, University of North Carolina
- 2015: Michael Sweeney, Ohio University
- 2014: Leonard Teel, Georgia State
- 2013: David Abrahamson, Northwestern University
- 2012: David Paul Nord, Indiana University
- 2010: David A. Copeland, Elon University
- 2009: Betty Winfield, University of Missouri
- 2008: Patrick Washburn, Ohio University
- 2007: Wally Eberhard, University of Georgia
- 2006: Hazel Dicken-Garcia, University of Minnesota
- 2005: Barbara Cloud, University of Nevada-Las Vegas
- 2004: Joseph McKerns, Ohio State University
- 2003: Michael Murray, University of Missouri-St. Louis
- 2002: Margaret A. Blanchard, University of North Carolina
- 2001: James Startt, Valparaiso University
- 1999: Hiley Ward, Temple University
- 1998: David Sloan, University of Alabama
- 1997: Maurine Beasley, University of Maryland
- 1992: Ed Emery, University of Minnesota
- 1986: Sidney Kobre, Florida State University and Community College of Baltimore

== See also ==
- List of history awards
