= St Patrick's Cathedral, Armagh (Roman Catholic) =

Coordinates: 54°21′08″N 6°39′37″W

Saint Patrick's Cathedral
- Cathedral Church of Saint Patrick in Armagh
- Ardeaglais Caitliceach Phádraig, Ard Mhacha
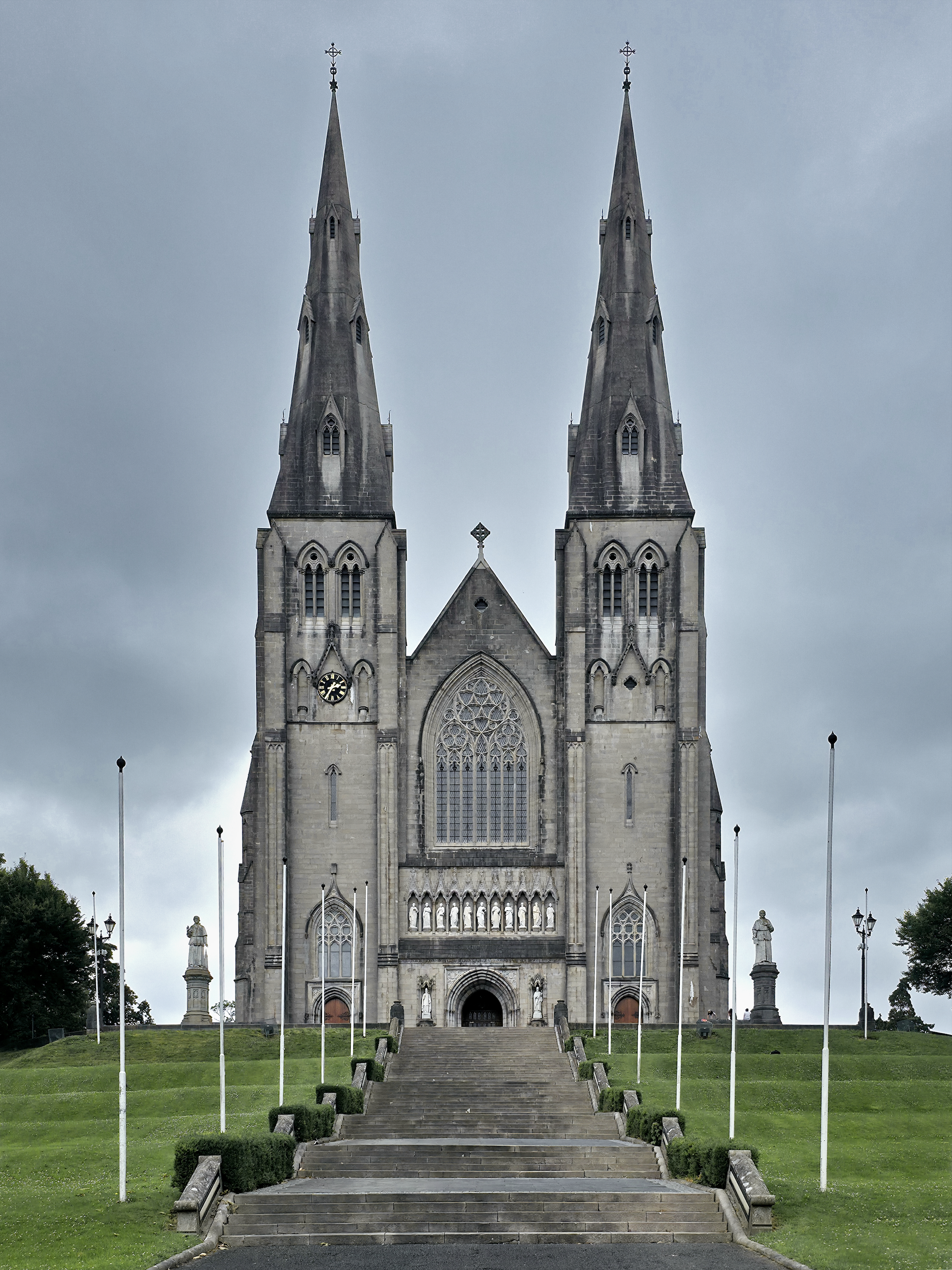
- Main façade of the Cathedral

- Shown within Northern Ireland
- Location: Armagh
- Country: Northern Ireland
- Language(s): English, Irish, Latin
- Denomination: Catholic
- Tradition: Roman Rite
- Website: armagharchdiocese.org/stpatrickscathedral

History
- Status: Cathedral
- Consecrated: 1904

Architecture
- Architect(s): Thomas Duff – 1838; JJ McCarthy – 1853; William Hague – 1899; George Ashlin – 1904
- Style: Gothic Revival
- Years built: 1840–1904
- Groundbreaking: 1838
- Completed: 1904

Specifications
- Length: 63.3 metres (208 ft)
- Width: 36 metres (118 ft)
- Height: 64 metres (210 ft)

Administration
- Province: Armagh
- Archdiocese: Armagh

Clergy
- Archbishop: Eamon Martin

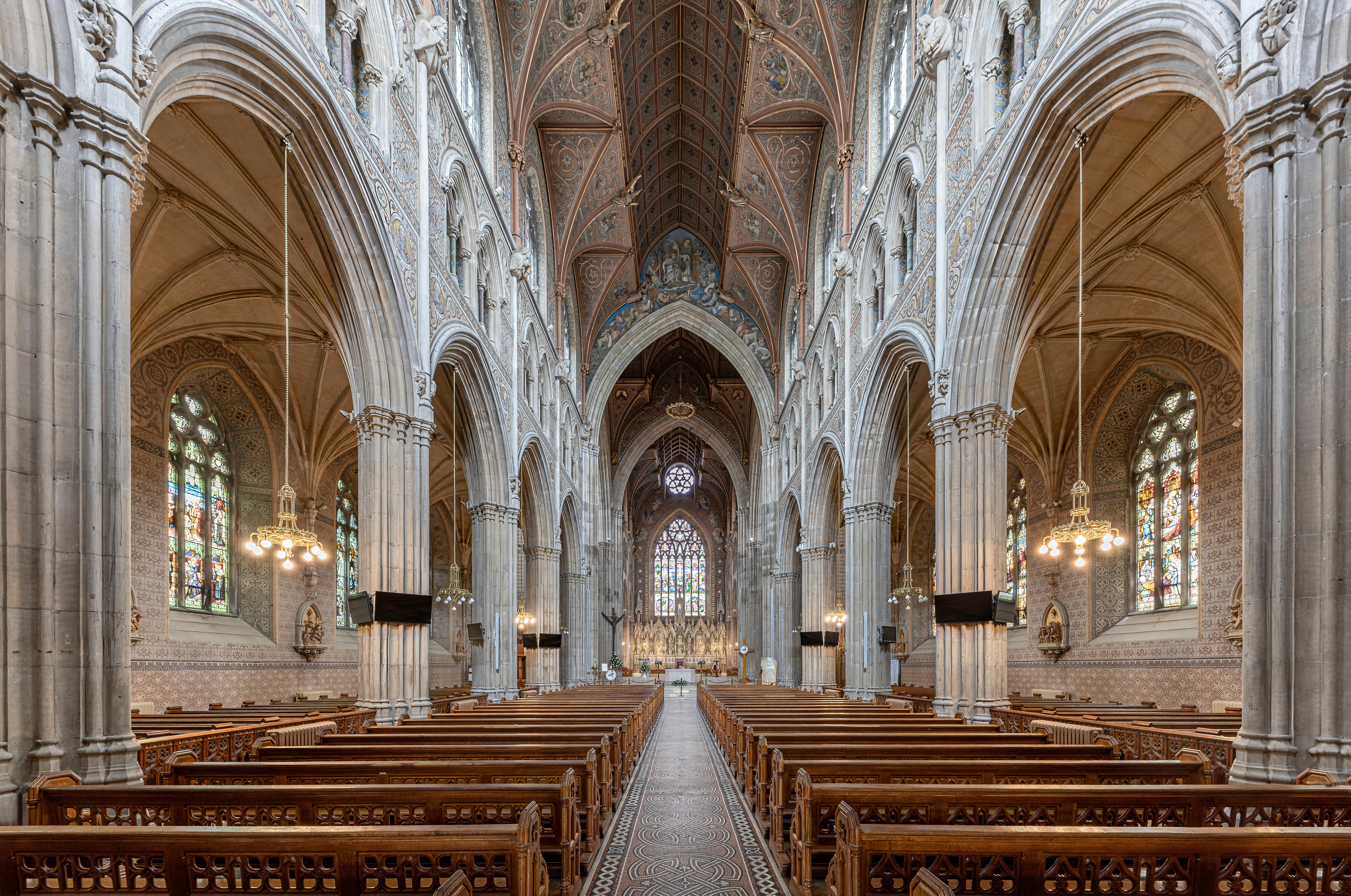
View from the nave to the chancel

St. Patrick's Cathedral in Armagh, Northern Ireland is the seat of the Catholic Archbishop of Armagh, Primate of All Ireland. It was built in various phases between 1840 and 1904 to serve as the Roman Catholic cathedral of the Archdiocese of Armagh, the original medieval Cathedral of St. Patrick having been appropriated by the state church called the Church of Ireland at the time of the Irish Reformation.

The Cathedral stands on a hill, as does its Anglican counterpart.

== Background ==
The building of a Catholic cathedral at Armagh was a task imbued with great historic and political symbolism. Armagh was the Primatial seat of Ireland and its ancient ecclesiastical capital. Yet, since the Irish Reformation under Henry VIII, no Catholic Archbishop had resided there. Since the seventeenth century, the majority Catholic population of Ireland had lived under the rigours of the Penal Laws, a series of enactments which were designed, in the words of the Anglo-Irish historian Lecky, "to deprive Catholics of all civil life; to reduce them to a condition of extreme, brutal ignorance; and, to disassociate them from the soil". As a result, whilst to some extent tolerated, the public practice of Catholicism was almost completely extinguished and all Churches existent at the time of the enactment of the laws were ceded to the Established Church.

Thus, by the end of the eighteenth century, there were few Catholic churches and no cathedrals in existence in Ireland for a large Catholic population. Following Catholic emancipation in 1829, the need to construct churches and cathedrals to serve this population became apparent. The lack of a Catholic presence in the Primatial City of Armagh in particular became a popular cause of discontent among the emerging Catholic episcopacy, clergy and congregation.

== The cathedral of Primate Crolly ==
Archbishop William Crolly was appointed to the Catholic See of Armagh in 1835 and almost immediately sought permission to reside in Armagh; the first Catholic Primate to do so since the Reformation. Having settled in the town, he then set about seeking a site for a new Catholic cathedral. The main difficulty in constructing a Catholic cathedral at Armagh was that the land of Armagh City and suburbs consisted almost entirely of "see-land", the mensal estate or demesne of the Protestant Primate and thus would not be available for the Catholic episcopacy to purchase. A site at the apex of Sandy Hill on the outskirts of the town had however been sold to the Earl of Dartrey.

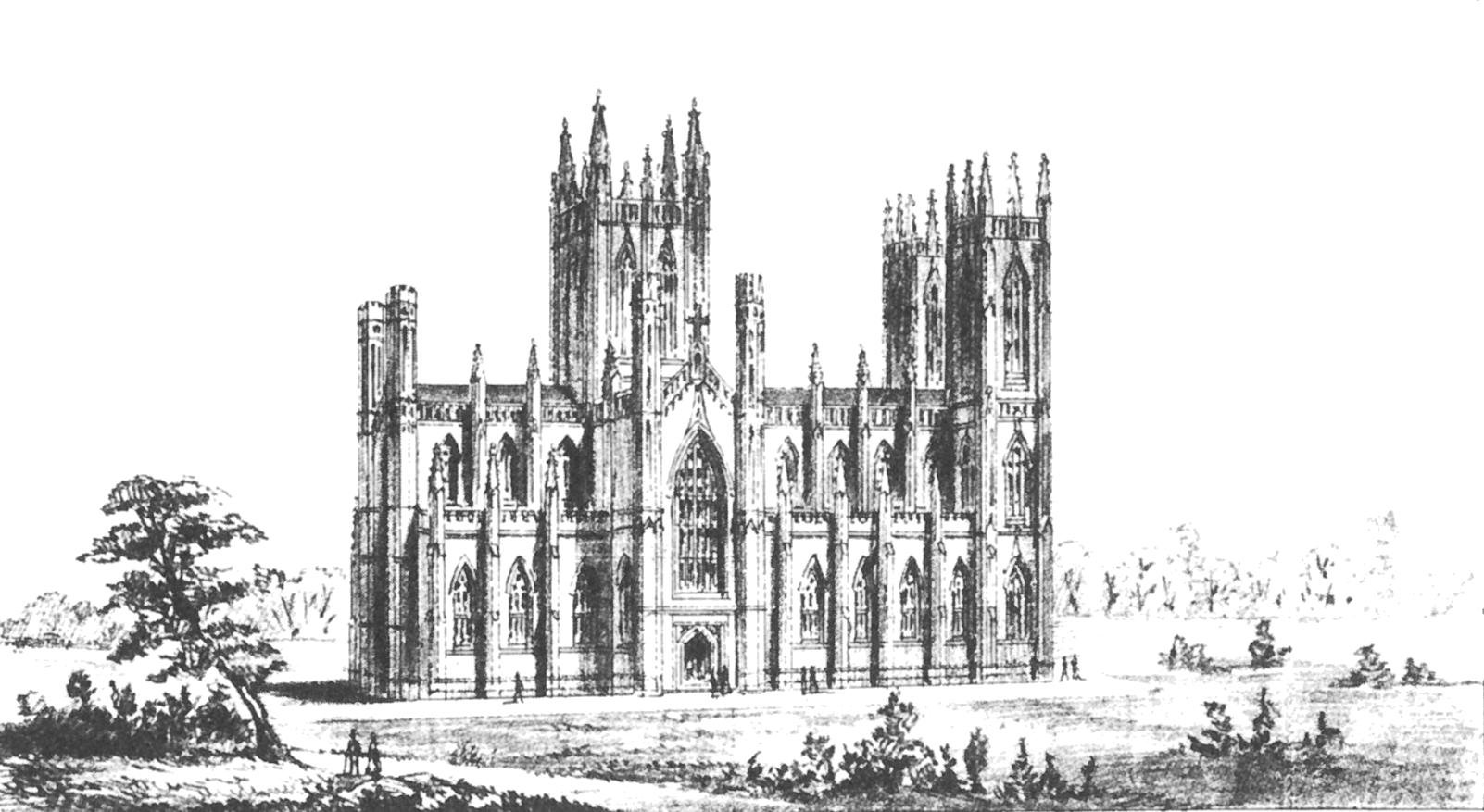
Armagh St. Patrick's Cathedral as originally designed by Thomas J. Duff c. 1840

A building committee was established and a weekly penny collection taken in for the construction project. The architect was to be Thomas Duff of Newry who had designed the Cathedral there and also the Pro-Cathedral at Dundalk. He designed a cruciform building, with nave, aisles, transepts, chancel, and choir; a large square central tower, and two smaller ones on the west front flanking the great doorway, and flush with the aisle walls, resembling York Minster. As at Dundalk, the style was a highly romanticised version of the Perpendicular Gothic of the sixteenth century. The foundation stone was laid on St Patrick's Day 1838 but as a result of the Irish Famine, work ground to a halt in 1847 with the foundations and aisles only partially complete.

== The cathedral of Primates Dixon and McGettigan ==
Archbishop Crolly was himself a victim of the famine, contracting cholera whilst tending to famine ravaged Drogheda and dying on Good Friday 1849, and was buried in the unfinished cathedral. His successor, Archbishop Paul Cullen abandoned the project and moved the Primatial See to Drogheda. It was only when Cullen was translated to Dublin and Archbishop Joseph Dixon was appointed to the See of Armagh that work recommenced in 1854. By this time, Duff was dead and there had been a revolution in ecclesiastical architectural taste in Ireland. Following visits to Ireland by A. W. N. Pugin, the Perpendicular Gothic style of the sixteenth century had fallen from favour and earlier Medieval Gothic had become more popular. The architect James Joseph McCarthy, a self-styled "pupil" of Pugin, was appointed to oversee the completion of the cathedral.

The position as architect to the new cathedral was rather a difficult one for, by the time of McCarthy's appointment, the walls of Duff's Perpendicular building were already 10 metres (34 ft) high and had reached the top of the aisles. McCarthy did not wish to continue to build in the now unfashionable Perpendicular Gothic of Duff. His solution was to start building a Decorated Gothic Cathedral of the fourteenth century on top of the purportedly sixteenth century foundations and walls. Decorated Gothic tracery was inserted into the existing window openings and at the West end, he reduced the size of the traceried window and inserted below it an arcade of apostolic statues. The pitch of Duff's roof was raised a full 6.1 metres (20 ft), adding greatly to the exterior impact of the building, and the aisle roofs were raised accordingly, permitting the insertion of a triforium below the clerestory. A sense of drama was added to the transepts by the addition of asymerical spired turrets to their ends and the addition of rose windows to their gables. The most dramatic change effected to Duff's plans was the abandonment of the three rather squat towers designed by Duff to reach a height of 39 metres (128 ft). Instead, two breached towers crowned with spires 64 metres (210 ft) high were constructed at the West end.

Dixon died in 1866 again before the completion of the cathedral and once again the project was abandoned under his elderly successor Archbishop Michael Kieran. It thus fell to Kieran's successor, Archbishop Daniel McGettigan to complete the building. Following the completion of the spires, McGettigan turned his attention to the interior. Here, to capitalise on the increased height gained at the expense of external massing, McCarthy constructed an elaborately carved vaulted hammer-beam roof with carved angels terminating the hammer beams and stone saints as corbels. He designed a Caen stone reredos which spans the entire wall of the east end and which is filled with carvings from the life of the Virgin below an arcade of carved and crocketted pinnacles and centered with a carved canopy over a statue of the Madonna and Child. Archbishop McGettigan commissioned painted murals to adorn the walls of the Lady Chapel and stencilling was applied to its ceiling. The cathedral was dedicated on 24 August 1873.

Interior of the cathedral as completed in 1873

Following the dedication, Primate McGettigan continued to make improvements as funds and his declining health would allow. In 1875, he commissioned the Stations of the Cross from Herbert & Co. of Liverpool and installed the Great 33-stop pipe organ by William Telford. In 1879, the seven-light east window was filled with stained glass by Earley & Powell of Dublin and work began on the seven terrace flight of steps to the plaza in front of the west end. Finally in 1884, a sacristan's lodge was constructed at the bottom of the steps. When Archbishop McGettigan died in December 1887 after some years of failing health, the cathedral had seen the passing of five successive Archbishops and the expenditure of the unprecedented sum of over £70,000.

== The cathedral of Cardinal Logue ==
McGettigan's successor as Archbishop was Michael Logue, longest serving Archbishop of Armagh. A famously learned cleric, Logue was appointed to the College of Cardinals by Pope Leo XIII in 1893, becoming the first Archbishop of Armagh appointed to the college in its history. When he arrived at the completed cathedral at Armagh, Logue was far from impressed. He complained of the "weak and beggerly elements" of interior decoration and stated that "visitors who had approached the Cathedral filled with admiration for the beauty of its exterior, were…disagreeably surprised, not to say disedified, at the comparative shabbiness and poverty of the interior". On 20 August 1899, Cardinal Logue issued a Pastoral Letter entitled "The National Cathedral" exhorting the people of Ireland and its diaspora to supply sufficient funds to beautify the interior of the cathedral. A fundraising bazaar was organised in 1900 and the firm of the architect William Hague of Dublin (who had inherited much of McCarthy's practice on the latter's death) was appointed to make plans.

The bazaar raised over £30,000 and Logue travelled to Italy with his architect to visit marble quarries and artisan workshops, choosing materials and craftspeople to carry out Hague's plans. Hague died soon after designing the first of his additions: a marble rood screen, 9.1 metres (30 ft) wide and 11 metres (36 ft) tall.

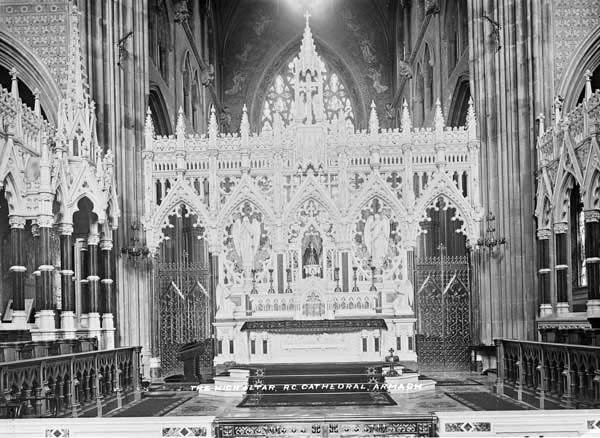
Hague's Rood Screen of Carrara Marble sits behind Ashlin's High Altar of 1904

His replacement was George Coppinger Ashlin, former partner of Pugin's son. Upon appointment, Ashlin almost immediately identified a major structural problem with the roofs on McCarthy's aisles and a new groined roof of Bath Stone was constructed. This, combined with repairs on the foundations of the towers which had not been designed to take the weight of McCarthy's spires, used much of the funds raised by the Bazaar. Nevertheless, Cardinal Logue pressed ahead with lavish plans. Ashlin designed a High Altar carved from Carrara marble, Lapis Lazuli and Jasper to sit before Hague's rood screen and the Italian sculptor, Cesare Aureli was commissioned to carve a frontal in alto relievo of Leonardo da Vinci's Last Supper.

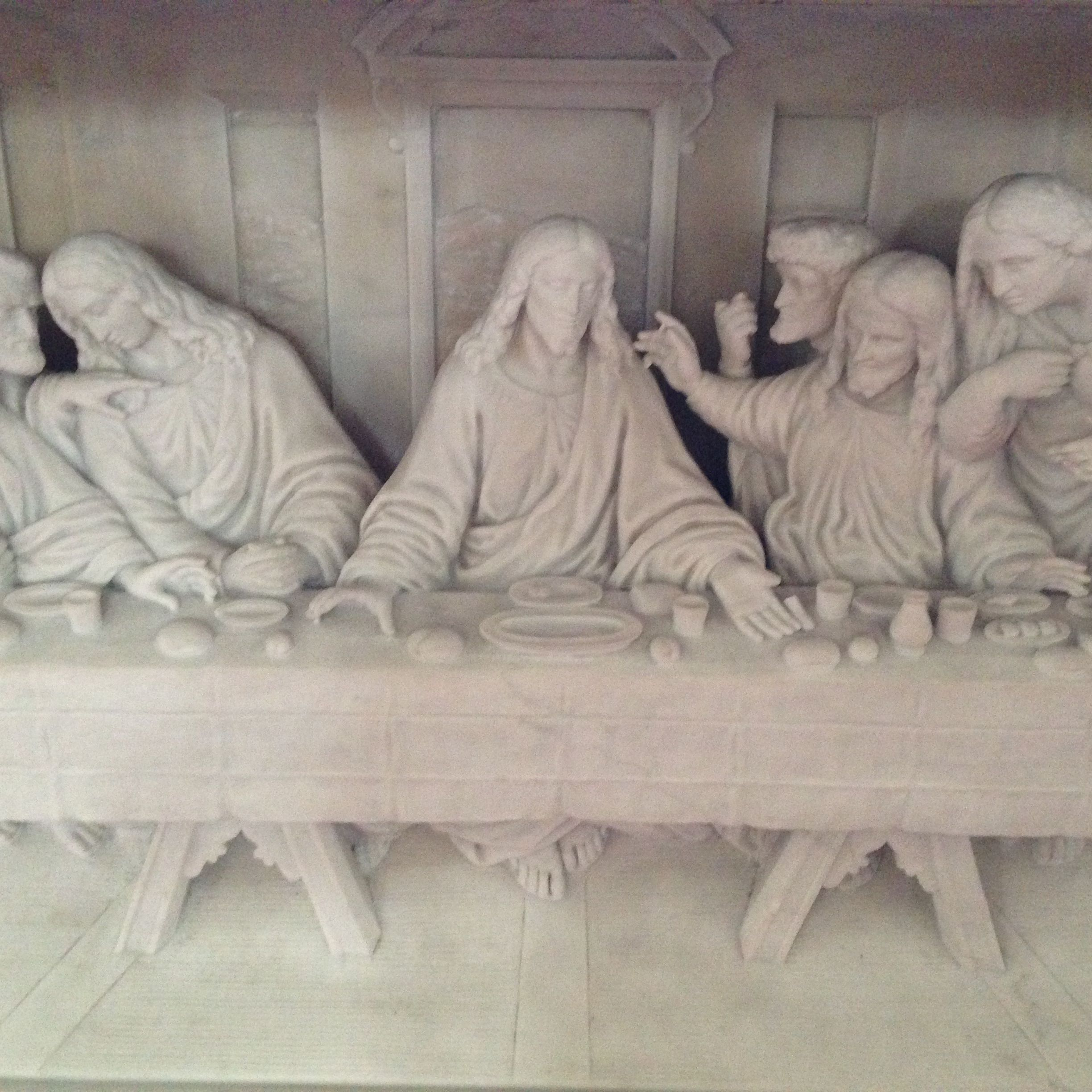
Detail, Cesare Aureli, The Last Supper, 1904

Ashlin closed the Crossing by constructing two side screens of statuary marble, 9.1 metres (30 ft) wide, across the north and south transepts and statuary marble communion railings inlaid with Breccia di S Votaleat the Nave.

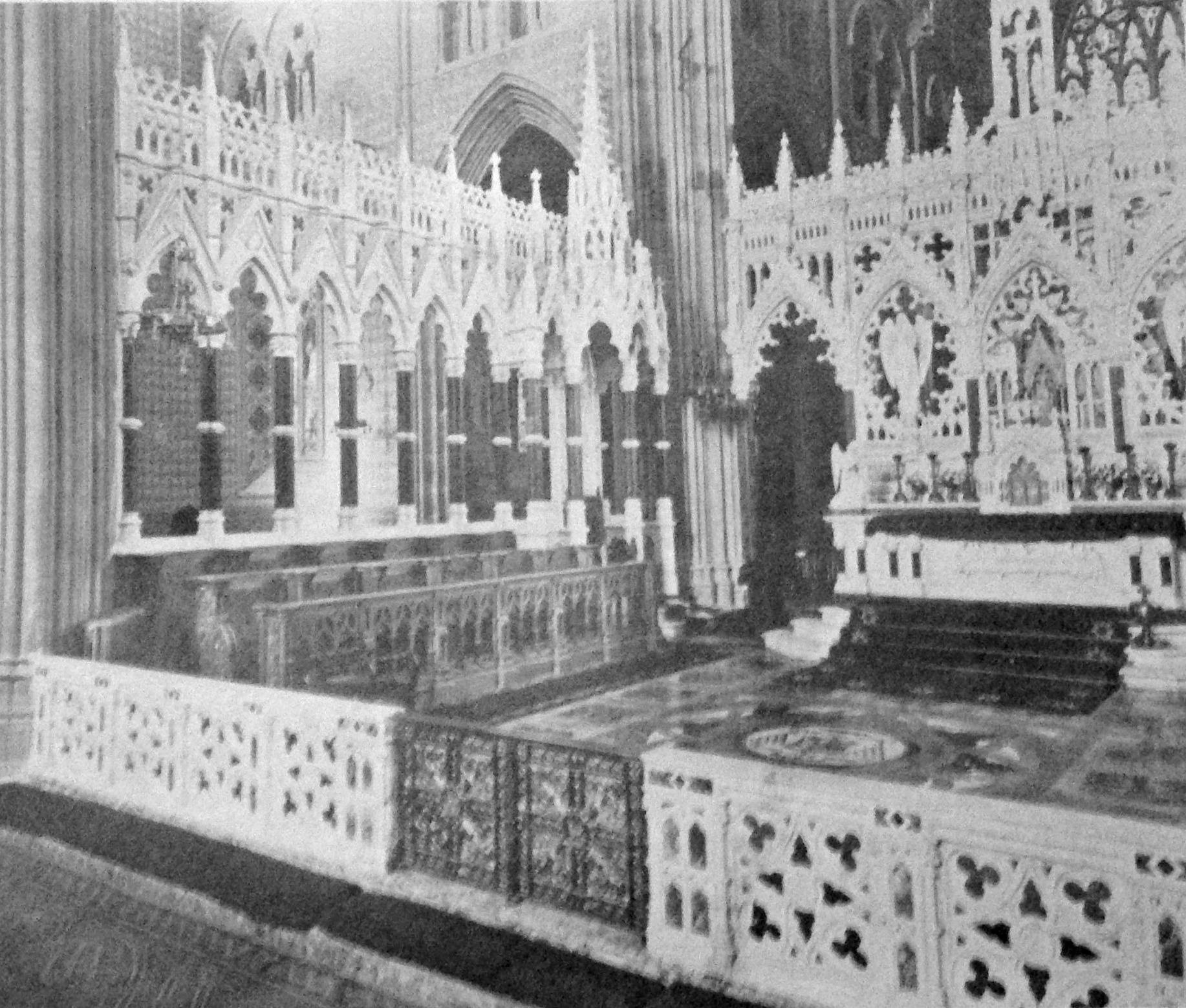
Ashlin's altar screens, 1904

The Cathedra throne projected in three divisions at the second bay on the North side with canopied niches, having crockets and pinnacles and surmounted by a marble spire. The centre of the throne was carved with the arms of the cardinal in statuary marble. The entire crossing was paved with inlaid marbles, designed in squares with quatrefoil panels and crosses and centred on a pietra dura representation of the Cardinal's armorial bearings.

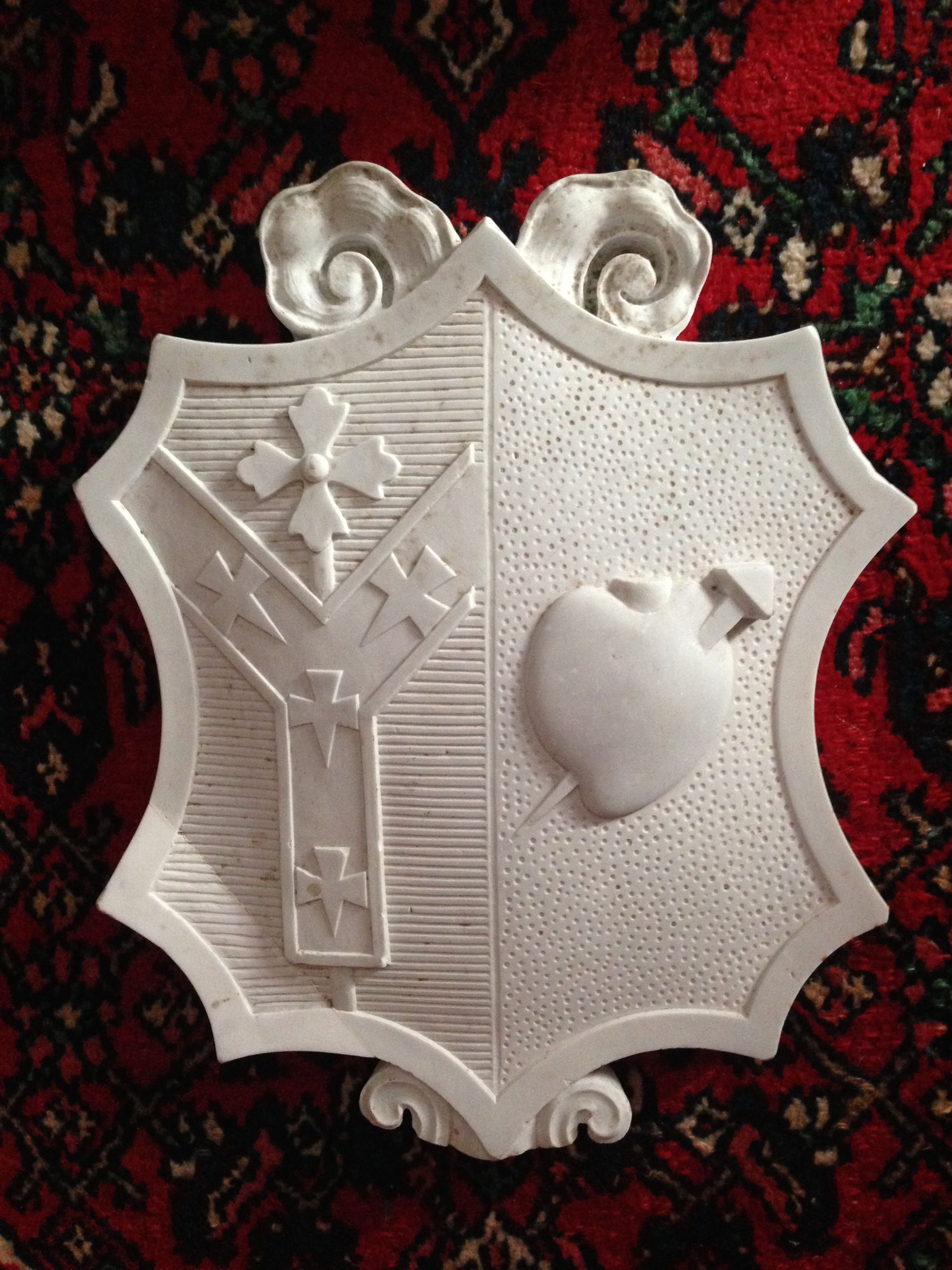
Carved armorial bearings of Michael, Cardinal Logue from the cathedra throne, 1904

An elaborate pulpit was constructed at the south west pier of the crossing. Composed of statuary marble inlaid with rare coloured marbles, its plan was octagonal, with angle niches containing statues of the Evangelists, Saint Patrick and Saint Brigid, the canopies above the statues being groined and carved. The panels between the statues were filled with inlaid traceries. The canopy of the pulpit, rising to a height of nearly 36 ft. was carved in Austrian oak painted white and inlaid with coloured enamels and gold leaf.

Ashlin's pulpit of 1904

Behind the rood screen, McCarthy's reredos was retained intact but its lower portions were enriched with marble inlays in a diaper pattern with fleur de lis in a vibrant variety of coloured Italian marbles. A new Lady Altar and tabernacle was constructed before the reredos from statuary marble. The antependium contained three bas-relief groups, the work of the eminent Roman sculptor Michele Trepisciano (1860–1913) showing "The Presentation of the Blessed Virgin in the Temple", "The Assumption" and "The Coronation of the Virgin" recessed in separate panels with cusped heads, and columns of Breccia di Seravezza antica and Breccia Corallina marbles. The tabernacle, inlaid with Corsican Jasper, was in the form of a cube topped with a roof of fish scale carvings and finished with two large statuary marble standing angels.

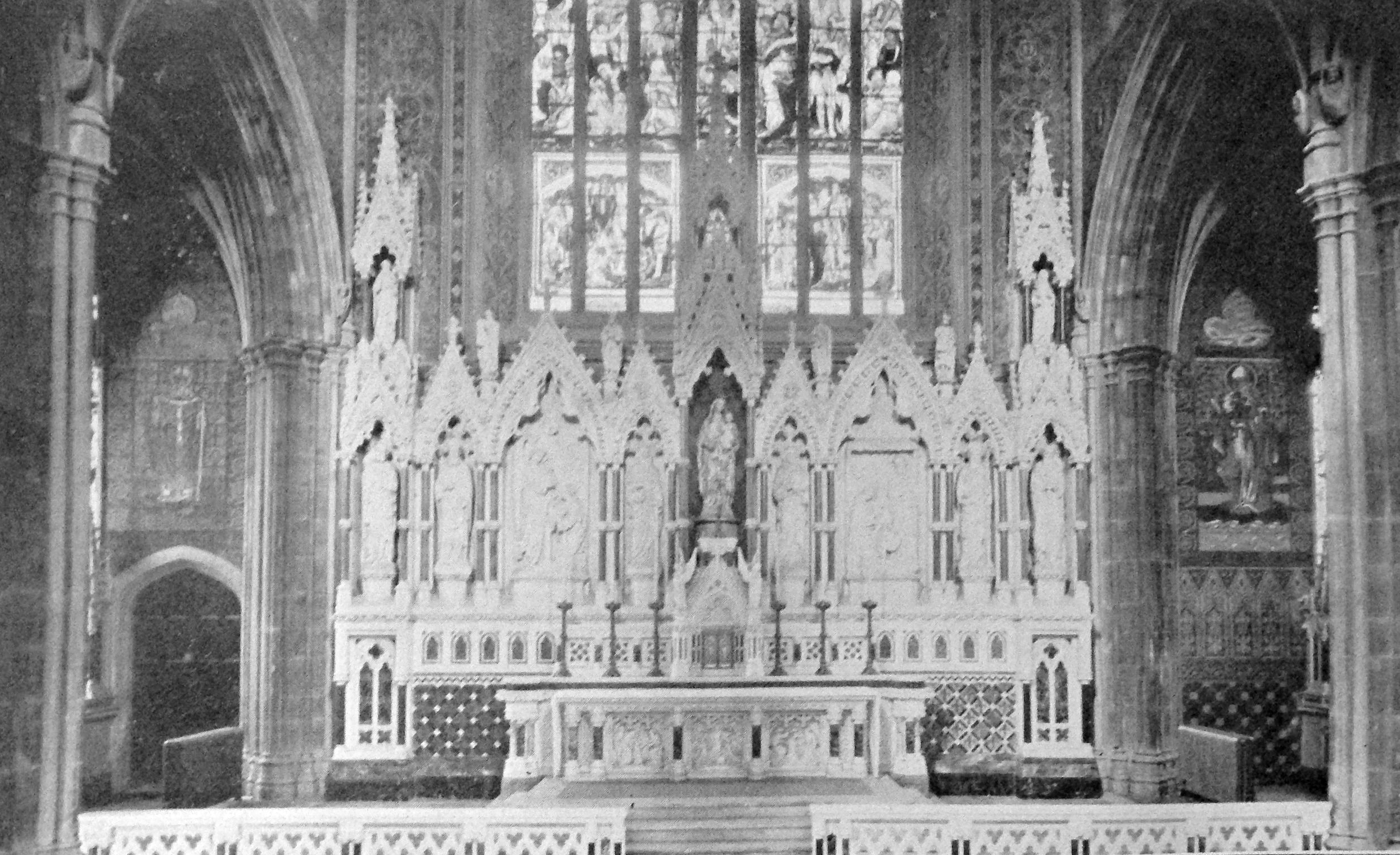
Lady Altar, 1904

To the North and South of the Lady Chapel, Side Chapels were erected and dedicated to Saint Joseph (North) and Saint Brigid (South), closing the aisles at the East.

St Joseph's Altar, 1904

In the South transept, a sumptuous altar was erected to the Sacred Heart. Finally, to the West end, McCarthy's wooden gallery was replaced with a three-bay marble screen of white marble supported on quatrefoil pillars of Portasanta marble and inlaid with Brocatello marble. The organ itself was rebuilt to suit the newly enlarged space and a new Austrian oak organ case was designed and built.

The most striking and lasting of Cardinal Logue's legacies to the cathedral were, however, the scheme of mosaics he commissioned to adorn every inch of blank wall in the cathedral. Significant thought was given to how best to deal with the decoration of the walls of the building. Archbishop McGettigan had completed a scheme of painted murals and stencilling of the walls but, as a result of Armagh's damp climate, these had perished within a few years of completion. It was therefore decided to adopt a mosaic decorative scheme, the initial great cost being defrayed by the future saving on repainting a mural scheme. The material employed was Italian pottery of various colours in dice-shaped cubes with glass cubes for the gilt portions to prevent tarnishing and to give greater lustre. The sections were put together in two workshops in London and were carefully glued, face downwards, on strips of paper. These were then applied to a fresh coating of special cement on the walls in a manner resembling the hanging of wallpaper.

To complete his scheme of decoration, Cardinal Logue commissioned the Italian painter, Oreste Amici (1872–1930), who had been trained at the Institute of Fine Arts in Rome, to paint the entirety of McCarthy's hammer beam roof in an Italianate style. The ceilings are painted in oils, the prevailing shade adopted for the ground colour throughout being of a soft terra-cotta to harmonise with the colour of the wall mosaic.

With the works complete, the cathedral was solemnly rededicated on 20 July 1904.

== Re-ordering: The cathedral of Cardinals Conway and O'Fiaich ==
William, Cardinal Conway was appointed to the See of Armagh in 1963 although he had been serving as leading Irish participant in the Second Vatican Council since its inauguration. He returned to Armagh as Archbishop keen to institute the reforms suggested by the council. The reforms on liturgy required greater congregational participation in Catholic services and for some time it had been felt that the 1904 marble works at the crossing had impeded large-scale ritual in the cathedral. Conway thus inaugurated an architectural competition to adapt the sanctuary of Armagh Cathedral to the new requirements and to allow greater freedom of movement and visibility around the sanctuary area. Several candidates submitted designs and controversially all of them suggested the removal of substantially all Ashlin's marble works at the crossing. Conway chose the winning design by Liam McCormick (1916–1996), though work did not commence on the reorganisation of the crossing until after Cardinal Conway's death in 1977.

It thus fell to Tomas, Cardinal O'Fiaich to complete the works. As completed, they were as radical as they were divisive. The entirety of the marble work at the crossing was removed and much of it destroyed, including Hague's rood screen and Ashlin's high altar, cathedra, altar rails and inlaid marble floor. The pulpit was dismantled and broken up and the side altars to Saints Brigid and St Joseph were removed and relocated in other churches. Only McCarthy's Caen Stone reredos survived removal, though its lower portions, enriched in 1904 with Carrara marble, were dismantled and floral tapestries attached to the lower portion of the reredos in their stead. New fittings carved from roughly hewn Wicklow Granite were fitted at the crossing and the sanctuary area was extended beyond the line of the former rood screen and raised by several feet and clad in polished Wicklow granite. Criticism had been made of the 1904 scheme's foreign design and materials as a result of which the reorganisation stressed its native roots. The new altar, ambo and tabernacle were carved by a Dundalk sculptor, Peter McTigue and the tabernacle door was manufactured in Kilkenny. Carpets replacing the former marble floor were woven in Killybegs. To replace the rood cross, a huge sculpture entitled "The Tree of Life" was commissioned from Imogen Stuart, the German-born Irish sculptor. The cathedral was again rededicated on 13 June 1982 when relics of St. Malachy were placed in the new altar.

The Crossing as designed by Liam McCormick, 1982

The works were met with almost unopposed shock and outcry. "Neither the quality of the replacements nor the skill of the craftsmanship can disguise the total alienation of the new work from the spirit and meaning that was McCarthy's ecclesiological and architectural inspiration. In this setting, these modern intrusions appear dispassionate and irrelevant" lamented the Ulster Architectural Heritage Society (UAHS, 1992). Architectural historian Jeanne Sheehy wrote of the re-ordering as "the replacement ... of a fine late Gothic revival chancel with chunks of granite and a tabernacle that looks like a microwave".

== Restoration and renewal: The cathedral of Cardinal Brady ==
Although the decorative style of the cathedral was thus significantly changed in 1982, the building itself had not undergone any major structural works since the replacement of the aisle roofs in 1904. By 2002, the necessity for major structural repairs to the building had become obvious. As a result of the construction methods of the walls and wear to the roof, damp had damaged much of the mosaic and the painted decorations had been dulled with smoke and dust. A great deal of the external stonework had perished and the twin spired towers had become unstable. A Diocesan committee charged with overseeing these major structural works to secure the building decided that the time was also ripe for reviewing the much criticised sanctuary. The firm of Rooney & McConville was commissioned to redesign the sanctuary area. McCormick's vilified fittings were removed in their entirety and the sanctuary area was re-floored with Italian porcelain tiles from Armatile mimicking the inlaid marble floor of 1904 which had survived, largely intact, under McCormick's granite podium. A new altar and ambo of Tunisian limestone were installed.

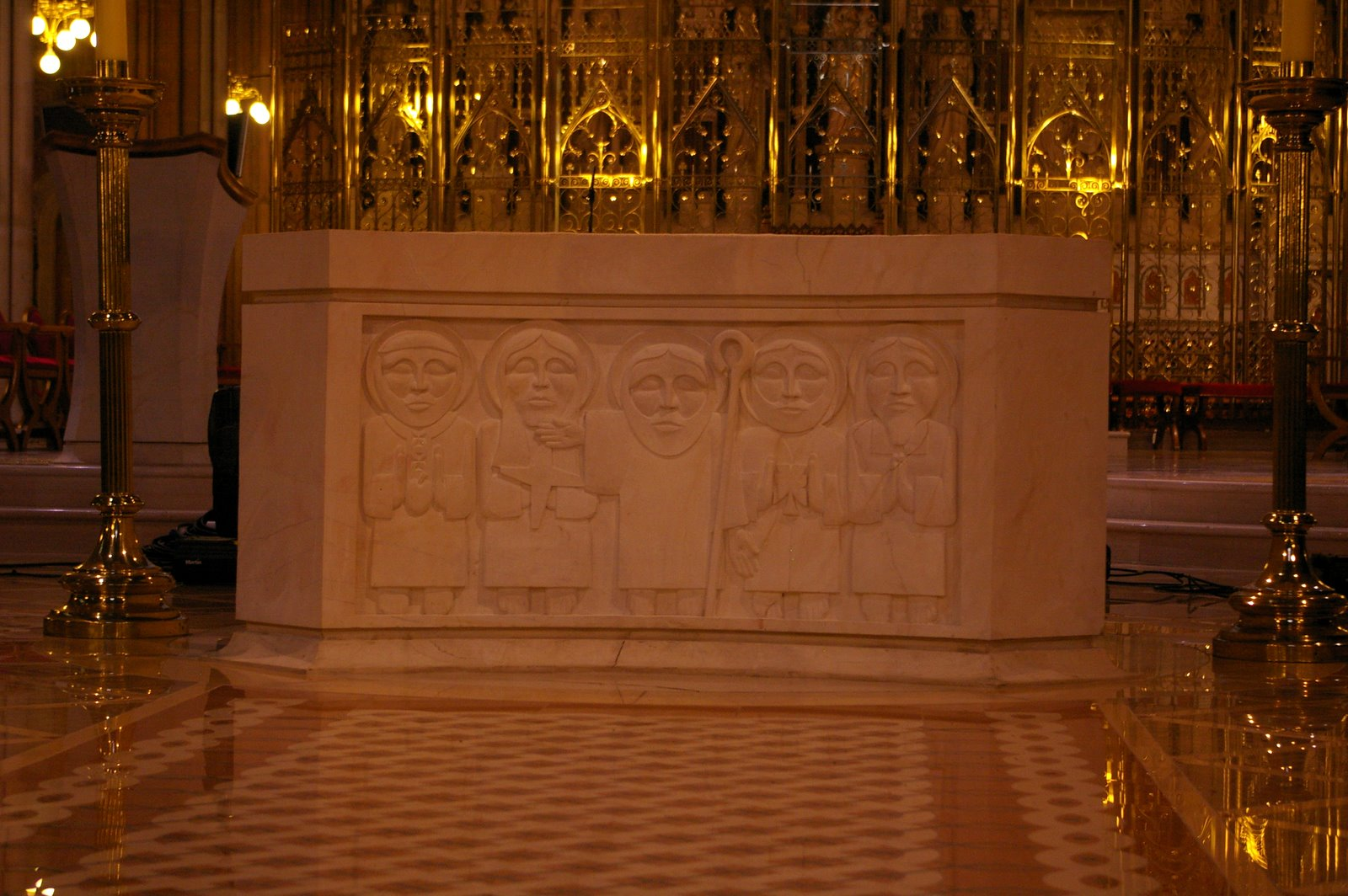
The altar includes St. Patrick and other saints.

The altar was inspired by early-Irish crosses and has imagery of Christ (Crucified, Risen, Return in Glory), flanked by Apostles, on three sides. The fourth side visible from the main body of the Church shows Our Lord with four Irish saints: St. Patrick, St. Malachy, St. Brigid and St. Oliver Plunkett. Two pairs of brass gates which had survived from the 1899 marble Rood Screen were replicated several times over, welded together, topped with newly-designed Gothic cresting and made into a new fully brass screen behind the high altar, restoring a separate Lady Chapel area as the culmination of an ambulatory around the sanctuary area. The tabernacle was removed to the South transept which was itself screened off with further brass screens and the Cathedra placed on a dais directly behind the new altar. An Evangelarium was created in the South tower (now converted to a shop) and the baptistry was restored at the base of the North tower. The base of McCarthy's reredos was restored and the 1904 inlaid marbles uncovered. By the time of the rededication of the cathedral on 25 May 2003, more than £6,000,000 had been spent.

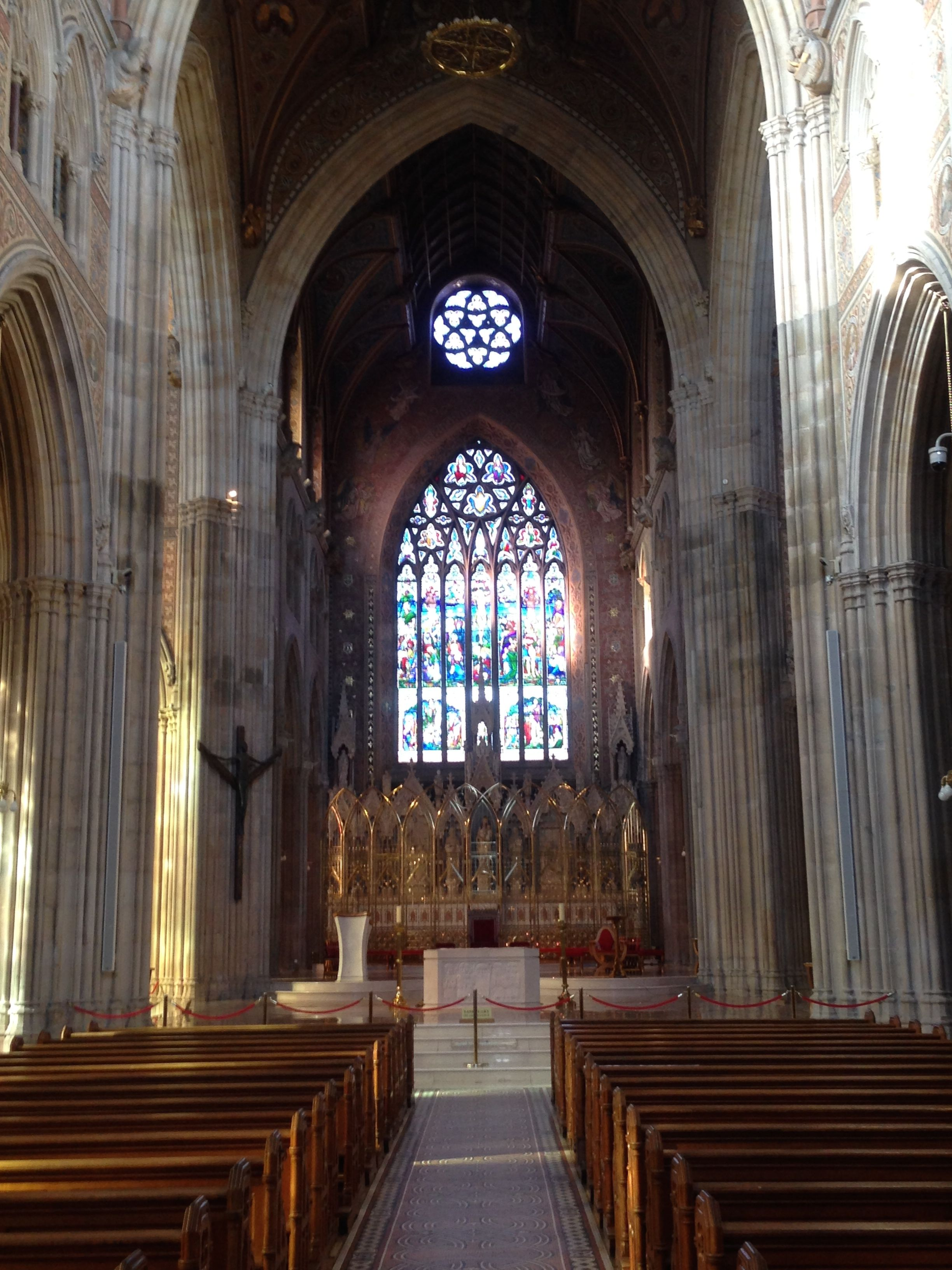
The Crossing as designed by Rooney & McConville, 2003

== The cathedral today ==
The Cathedral parish includes the churches of: St. Patrick' Cathedral, the Church of St Malachy, the Church of St Colmcille at Knockaconey, and the Church of The Immaculate Conception in the Tullysaran District of Armagh.

Daily Mass is held Monday to Saturday at 10:00am. On Sunday, Mass is celebrated at 11:00am, 12:30pm & 5:30pm, with a 6:30pm Vigil Mass on Saturday evening. Holy Day Masses are celebrated at 11:00am. Confessions are usually heard before the Saturday evening Vigil Mass.

== Burials ==
- William Crolly
- William Cardinal Conway
- John Cardinal D'Alton
- Cahal Cardinal Daly
- Tomás Cardinal Ó Fiaich
- Michael Cardinal Logue

== Organ ==
The cathedral organ was built by William Telford in 1875. In 1987, the organ was rebuilt, enlarged and tonally altered by the Irish Organ Company Ltd. who also provided a new terraced drawknob console. The rebuild was designed by the late John Holmes with the cathedral organist Baron George Minne as a consultant. Not all of the old pipework and casework was restored and retained. The organ now has elements of the English, French Cavaille-Coll and European style, the dominant sound being French. The organ currently has four manuals and 58 stops.

=== Specification ===
Positif: Gelind Gedeckt 8, Bell Gamba 8, Singend Principal 4, Koppelflute 4, Nasard 2 2/3, Octavin 2, Tierce 1 3/5, Petit Cymbale III, Cromorne 8, Zymbalstern, Tremulant (adjustable), Octave, Great to Positif, Swell to Positif, Bombarde to Positif,

Great: Double Diapason 16, Open Diapason 8, Gamba 8, Bourdon 8, Principal 4, Flute Ouverte 4, Twelfth 2 2/3, Fifteenth 2, Fourniture V, Cymbale II (an overall crazy screaming affair,) Bombarde 16, Trompette 8, Clairon 4, Swell to Great, Positif to Great, Positif Sub-Octave to Great,

Swell: Open Diapason 8, Stopped Diapason 8, Salicional 8, Unda Maris 8, Principal 4, Doublette 2, Plein Jeu III, Basson 16, Cornopean 8, Clarion 4, Tremulant (adjustable), Octave, Sub-Octave,

Bombarde: Flute Harmonique 8, Voce Umana 8+8, Carillon III, Orlos 8, Trompeta Magna 16 (TC from Trompeta Réal 8), Trompeta Réal 8, Clarin 4 (From Trompeta Réal 8), Campanabella (one octave of bells),

Pedal Gravissima 32, Principal 16, Violonbasse 16, Bourdon 16, Double Diapason (Great) Violone 8 (From Violonbasse 16), Gedecktbass 8, Principal 4, Doublette 2, Grosse Fourniture III, Carillon II, Bombarde 16, Basson 16 (Swell) Trumpet 8 (from Bombarde 16), Clarion 4 (From Bombarde 16), Orlos 4 (From Orlos 8, Bombarde) Positif to Pedal, Great to Pedal, Swell to Pedal, Bombarde to Pedal, Great and Pedal Pistons Coupled.

== Organist ==
The Organist of St. Patricks Cathedral from 1959 to 2005 was Baron George Minne, born in Belgium in 1924. He had a vast repertoire of Bach, Handel, Mozart and various French composers and was a most accomplished pianist and composer.

== See also ==
- List of carillons of the British Isles
- List of tourist attractions in Ireland

== Bibliography ==
- Buildings of Co. Armagh by C. E. B. Brett, published by the Ulster Architectural Heritage Society in 1999
- St. Patricks Cathedral, Armagh. Tomas Ó Fiaich. The Irish Heritage Series: 58, Eason & Sons Ltd, Dublin, 1987.
