= St. Patrick's Church, Dundalk =

Roman Catholic church in Dundalk, Ireland

Coordinates: 54°00′13″N 6°23′56″W

St. Patrick's Church
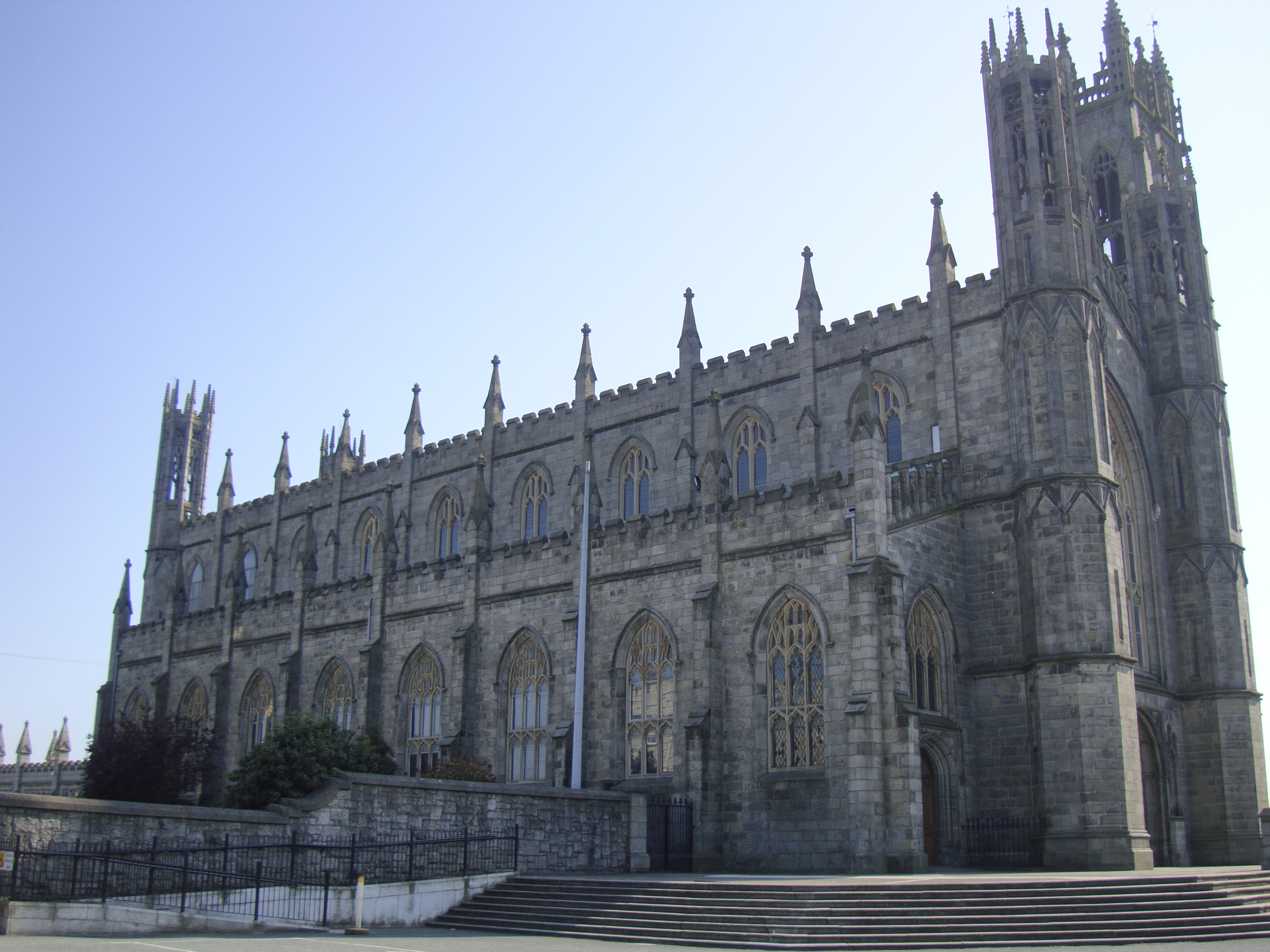
- Interactive map of the St. Patrick's Church area

General information
- Status: Church
- Architectural style: Gothic
- Location: Roden Place, Townparks, Dundalk, Ireland
- Groundbreaking: 1834
- Opened: 1842

Technical details
- Material: calp limestone, granite dressings

Design and construction
- Architect: Thomas Duff

Website
- www.stpatricksdundalk.com

The Church of St. Patrick, also named St. Patrick's Pro-Cathedral, is a large Roman Catholic church located in Dundalk, County Louth, Ireland. Dedicated to Saint Patrick known as the "Apostle of Ireland". He is the primary patron saint of Ireland.

It is built in the Gothic style, and was designed by the architect Thomas Duff.

It is possible to follow the masses celebrated at St Patrick's Parish live from the parish church website.

== History ==
There has been a Catholic church named Saint Patrick's in the town since 1750. The first building was on a site donated by the first Earl of Clanbrassil on Chapel Street and in 1843, was converted into a school.

The then-Parish priest, Fr. Matthew McCann, acquired the current site in 1834. The church was opened for worship in 1842 but was not complete for many years after. Work stopped during the Great Famine and resumed in 1860. It was designed by the Newry architect Thomas Duff, who modelled the interior on Exeter Cathedral, and the exterior on King's College Chapel. Duff died before completion and the architect J. J. McCarthy was chosen to finish the magnificent interior. The bell tower is a later addition, being added in 1903.

On 3 February 1867, Michael Kieran was consecrated as Archbishop of Armagh in St. Patrick's Church and chose during his tenure from 1867 to 1869 St. Patrick's in Dundalk as his mensal parish. The completion of St. Patrick's Cathedral in Armagh was left to his successor, Daniel McGettigan.

== Architecture and furnishings ==
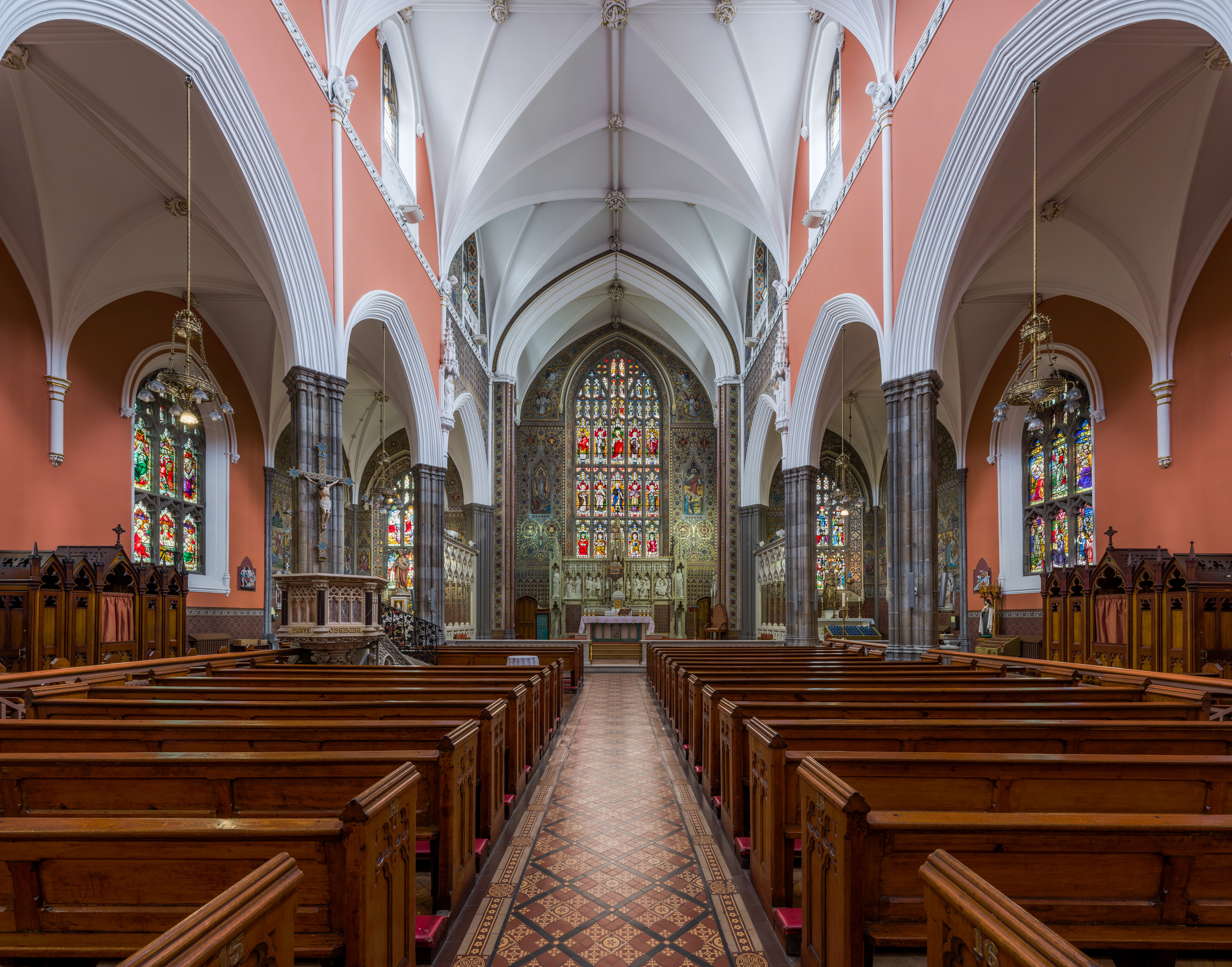
The interior looking towards the nave

It is 9 bays in length and has two side aisles to the north and south of the building. The church contains a wealth of distinctive features, including fine granite pillars, tiled floors, a vaulted ceiling and many colourful stained glass windows by acclaimed designers Franz Mayer & Co. of Munich, among others. McCarthy designed the high altar and ornamental screens covering the eastern wall while George Ashlin designed the intricate Italian mosaic walls in the chancel. The sculptor Thomas Farrell fashioned the side altars.

The organ was "opened" on 1 July 1900 at 1.00pm. Mr H.L. Balfour, organist at the Royal Albert Hall, gave a recital of classical music. The solemn opening and dedication of the organ took place in early 1901 with Cardinal Logue presiding.

The campanile & tower was erected in 1903. The tower was the gift of Mrs. Julia Hamill of Seat own in memory of her late husband John Hamill.

The mosaic sanctuary walls have been done by Ludwig Openheimer & Co. of Old Trafford, Manchester. This work was begun in 1909.
