= Henry Crookshank =

Irish geologist

Henry Crookshank (13 February 1893 – 10 August 1972) was an Irish geologist who worked in the Geological Survey of India serving as its superintendent in 1944-45.

Crookshank was born in Dublin, the second son of Elizabeth née Stokes (1867–1945) and Charles Henry Crookshank (1859-1927). His mother was a sister of the bacteriologist Adrian Stokes and a niece of the archaeologist Margaret McNair Stokes. He was educated at St. Columba's College and then Trinity College, Dublin where he studied mathematics but World War I interrupted his studies. He joined the Dublin Fusiliers in 1914 and served in the Middle East and France, while his brother Arthur who also served in the war died at Gallipoli. He returned in 1918 to study engineering and joined the Geological Survey of India in 1929. He began his geological work with oil surveys near Karachi and later studied sapphires in the Vizag area, and carried out further studies in the Satpura Gondwana Basin.

Crookshank served in the Northwest Frontier in the early 1940s but was shot in both legs and flown back to Rawalpindi. After recovering he was posted in charge of mica production in Rajputana.

Crookshank married Eileen "Kitty" Mary Somerville Lodge on October 28, 1921 at Calcutta and they had three daughters including Anne (January 3, 1927 – October 18, 2016) who became a professor of the history of art.

== Publications ==
1. Memoirs of the Geological Survey of India, vol 87 - Geology of Southern Bastar and Jeypore from the Bailadila Range to the Eastern Ghats. Published by Government of India 1963 2. Memoirs of the Geological Survey of India, volume LXVI, part 2 - Geology of the Northern slopes of the Satpuras between the Morand and the Sher rivers. Publishes by Government of India, 1936
