= Balts' Award =

Annual award for achievements in Latvian–Lithuanian culture

The Balts' Award (Latvian: Baltu balva, Lithuanian: Baltų apdovanojimas) is an annual award given to recognise excellence and achievements in the areas of Latvian-Lithuanian culture, history and language.

The award was inaugurated in 2018.

== List of recipients ==
- 2023: Edmundas Trumpa, Lithuanian linguist
- 2022: Dace Meiere, Latvian translator
- 2020: Alberts Sarkanis, Latvian philologist and diplomat
- 2019: Alvydas Butkus, Lithuanian linguist
- 2018: Laimute Balode, Latvian Lithuanian professor and linguist

== See also ==
- List of history awards
