= Thomas Duff (architect) =

Irish architect (1792–1848)

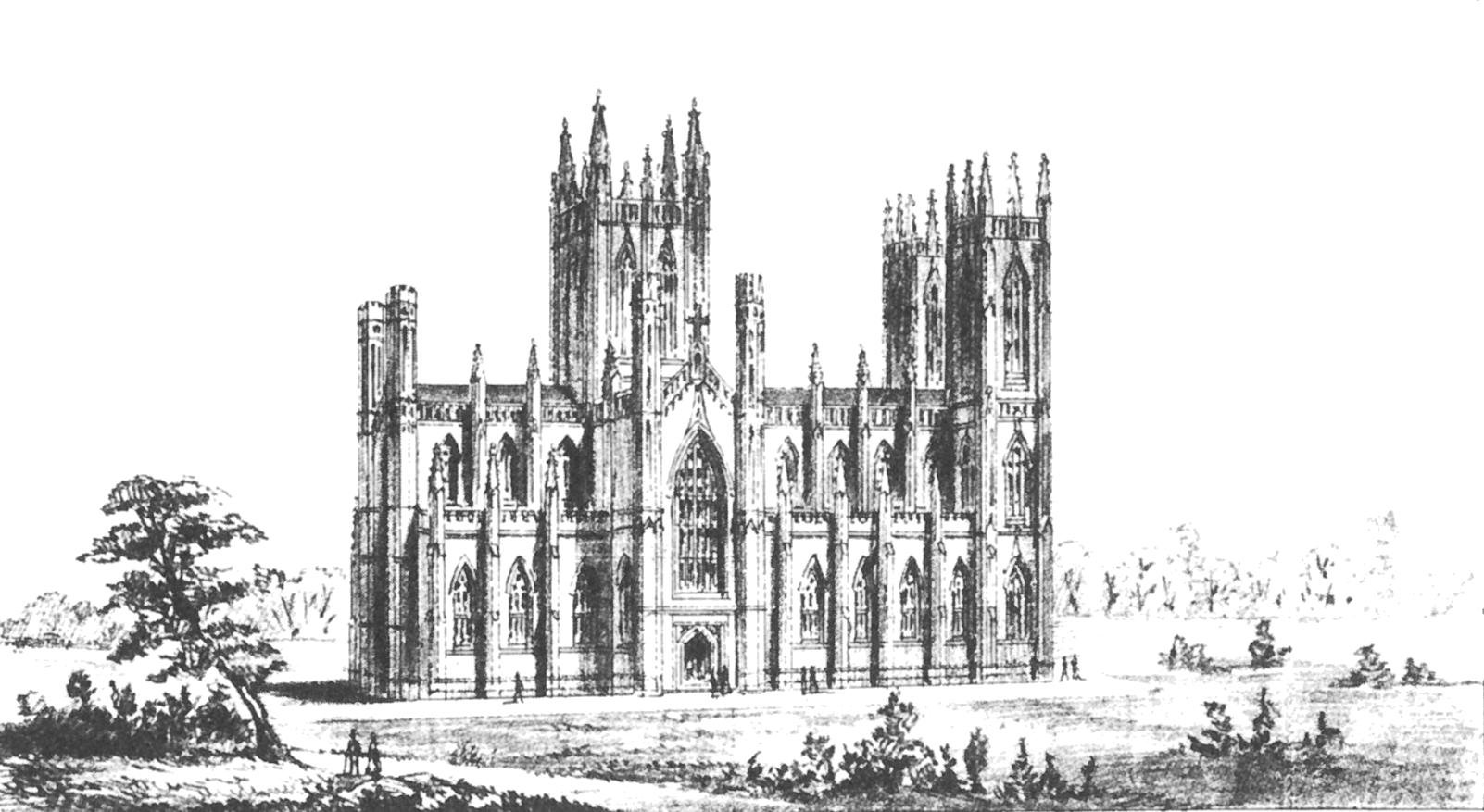
- St. Patrick's Cathedral, Armagh
- Born: 1792; Newry, County Down, Kingdom of Ireland
- Died: 1848 (aged 55–56); Newry, County Down, Ireland, United Kingdom of Great Britain and Ireland
- Occupation: Architect
- Buildings: St. Patricks Cathedral, Armagh Newry Cathedral

Thomas John Duff (1792–1848) was an Irish architect from Newry, County Down. Duff was the principal architect of a number of Roman Catholic churches and cathedrals in the northeast of Ireland.

His work included three churches dedicated to St.Patrick: St. Patrick's Church, Dundalk (modelled on King's College Chapel, Cambridge); Cathedral Church of St. Patrick and St. Colman, Newry, and Saint Patrick's Cathedral in Armagh city. Duff also designed St. Patrick's School in Belfast, the city's first National School and believed to be the last remaining Gothic Revival building in Belfast and the museum of the Belfast Natural History Society

== The Cathedral Church of St. Patrick and St. Colman, Newry ==
The cathedral in Newry was constructed between 1823 and 1829, and was the first Catholic church to be erected following Catholic Emancipation. The cathedral was described by a contemporary guide book in glowing terms: "This edifice may be ranked among the finest public buildings in Ireland, and is another enduring monument of the genius of Mr. Duff, who has studded the north of the kingdom, as it were, with evidence of his own ability, and of the good sense of his countrymen in employing a native artist."

== St. Patrick's, Armagh ==
The construction of St. Patrick's in Armagh began in 1840, but was suspended due to the intervention of the Great Famine. Duff had died by the time construction resumed in 1854, the project being completed by James Joseph McCarthy who finished the project in a decorated gothic style as opposed to the 16th century gothic preferred by Duff. This led to the situation, more familiar in genuine Gothic churches, whereby the cathedral was constructed in one style up to the aisles and a different style above this point.

== St. Patrick's, Dundalk ==
St. Patrick's Church, Dundalk was also under development at the time of Duff's death and was likewise completed by McCarthy.

== Presbyterian Church Building, Dundalk ==
The present church was opened it 1839. The site upon which the church on Jocelyn St. was built was leased by the Dundalk Presbyterian Congregation from the local landlord the Rt. Hon. Robert Earl of Roden on 30 March 1839. It was recorded as a:

"Lease for lives renewable forever of premises on which Dundalk Presbyterian Church is built. Yearly rent of £2 and fees not registered."

The following description of the Church is taken from 'The Buildings of Ireland – North Lenister' by Christine Casey and Alistair Rowan:

"Presbyterian Church. 1839 by Thomas Duff. Small four-bay gabled hall in a Tudor-Gothic idiom whose site and proportions blend nicely with the classical Methodist church across the street. Like Duff's nearby St. Patrick's, this small building has a Perp window in each gable, four-centred arched entrances and pinnacled buttresses defining each bay. It is also of coursed brownish granite with granite dressings. Inside, a single-bay vestibule leads through two Tudor arches into the tree-bay rectangular hall which is the church proper. A very pretty interior, with curved U-shape pine gallery carried on cast-iron quatrefoil columns. Plaster panelled ceiling with decorative hammerbeams and rosettes. – STAINED GLASS. Central light of s window: Christ the Good Shepherd, by Clokey of Belfast, 1944."

The description of the Church being in a style of Tudor-Gothic is unusual in itself. While many contemporary churches of this period are often described as being of Gothic architecture, a more accurate description would be that of 'Gothic-Revival' architecture, as this was essentially a style that became popular in the late eighteen and nineteen centuries. Gothic is a style that incorporated pointed arches over doors and windows, flying buttresses, and spires. And the features can be clearly seen to the exterior of this Church include such pointed arches over doors and windows, and it has buttressed walls, which incorporate pinnacles to their top. The reference to the Tudor styling refers to chiefly the interior of the Church. The Tudor style of architecture tended to contain mullioned windows, half-timbered work, and warm interior panelling and more comfortable furnishings. Naturally any Tudor style incorporated into this Church would again be of a revivalist nature. Therefore, it would be more accurate to describe the Church as being a 'Tudor-Gothic Revival' style of architecture.
