= Premio Friuli Storia =

Italian literary award

The Premio Friuli Storia (Friuli Storia Book Prize for Contemporary History) is an annual Italian literary award established in 2013 to promote standards of excellence in the writing of history books for a general readership. It is the only national Italian literary prize for non-fiction which entrusts the selection of the winner to a committee of non-specialist readers.

== Regulations ==
A scientific committee composed of academic historians produces a shortlist of books each year at the end of May. The committee is actually chaired by Tommaso Piffer and composed of Elena Aga Rossi, Roberto Chiarini, Ernesto Galli della Loggia, Ilaria Pavan, Paolo Pezzino, Silvio Pons, Andrea Possieri and Andrea Zannini. The winner is selected by a group of 500 readers and the final result is announced in September in Udine.

== Supporters ==
The national award is organized by Friuli Storia Association. The Region of Friuli Venezia Giulia, the province of Udine, Fondazione Friuli, the municipality of Udine, Poste Italiane, Banca di Udine and the Danieli Group have contributed to the creation of this prize. Over the years, the Associazione Partigiani Osoppo-Friuli, the Istituto Friulano per la Storia del Movimento di Liberazione, the Cultural Association èStoria, the Association Gruppo Studi Storici e Sociali Historia, the Pordenonelegge.it Foundation and the Università degli Studi di Udine have also collaborated in the organization of the Friuli Storia award.

== List of shortlisted books ==
(The winner or winners of each competition are highlighted in bold)

- 2023
  - **Vittorio Coco, Il generale dalla Chiesa, il terrorismo, la mafia (Editori Laterza, 2022)**
  - **Thomas Hippler, Il governo del cielo. Storia globale dei bombardamenti aerei (Bollati Boringhieri 2022)**
  - Andrea Riccardi, La guerra del silenzio. Pio XII, il nazismo, gli ebrei (Laterza, 2022)
- 2022
  - **Claudia Weber, Il patto. Stalin, Hitler e la storia di un’alleanza mortale (Einaudi, 2021)**
  - Gianluca Falanga, La diplomazia oscura. Servizi segreti e terrorismo nella Guerra fredda (Carocci, 2021)
  - Paolo Macry, Storia di fuoco. Patrioti, militanti, terroristi (Il Mulino, 2021)
- 2021
  - **Jacopo Lorenzini, L'elmo di Scipio. Storie del Risorgimento in uniforme (Salerno)**
  - Paolo Nello, Storia dell'Italia fascista (Il Mulino)
  - Volker Ulrich, 1945. Otto giorni a maggio. Dalla morte di Hitler alla fine del Terzo Reich. L'ultima settimana della Seconda guerra mondiale (Feltrinelli)
- 2020
  - **István Deák, Europa a processo. Collaborazione, resistenza e giustizia fra guerra e dopoguerra (Il Mulino)**
  - Carmine Pinto, La guerra per il Mezzogiorno. Italiani, borbonici e briganti. 1860-1870 (Laterzia)
  - Antonella Salomoni, Le ceneri di Babij Jar. L'eccidio degli ebrei di Kiev (Il Mulino)
- 2019
  - **Raoul Pupo, Fiume citta di passione (Laterza)**
  - Francesco Benigno, Terrore e terrorismo. Saggio storico sulla violenza politica (Einaudi)
  - Michele Colucci, Storia dell'immigrazione straniera in Italia. Dal 1945 ai nostri giorni (Carocci)
- 2018
  - **Marco Mondini, Il Capo. La Grande Guerra del generale Luigi Cadorna (Il Mulino)**
  - Emanuele Ertola, In terra d'Africa. Gli italiani che colonizzarono l'impero (Laterza)
  - Marco Monte, La grande carestia del 1813-1817 in Friuli. L'ultima grande crisi di sussistenza del mondo occidentale (Gaspari)
- 2017
  - **Maria Teresa Giusti, La campagna di Russia. 1941-1943 (Il Mulino)**
  - Tiziano Bonazzi, Abraham Lincoln. Un dramma americano (Il Mulino)
  - Piero Craveri, L’arte del non governo. L'inesorabile declino della Repubblica italiana (Marsilio)
- 2016
  - **Vladimiro Satta, I nemici della Repubblica. Storia degli anni di piombo (Rizzoli)**
  - Ettore Cinnella, Ucraina. Il genocidio dimenticato (1932-1933) (Della Porta)
  - Silvia Salvatici, Nel nome degli altri. Storia dell'umanitarismo internazionale (Il Mulino)
- 2015
  - **Leonardo Campus, I sei giorni che sconvolsero il mondo. La crisi dei missili di Cuba e le sue percezioni internazionali (Le Monnier)**
- 2014
  - **Lucia Ceci, L'interesse superiore. Il Vaticano e l'Italia di Mussolini (Laterza)**
  - Anna Foa, Portico d'Ottavia n. 13. Una casa del ghetto nel lungo inverno del ’43 (Laterza)
  - Gian Enrico Rusconi, 1914: attacco a Occidente (Il Mulino).

== See also ==
- List of history awards
