= CINOA Prize =

The CINOA Prize is a prize awarded yearly to art historians by CINOA, the international confederation of art dealers, "in recognition of an academic publication or a remarkable contribution to furthering the cultural preservation through art works in a CINOA member country".

== Recipients ==
- 2008 - Jean-Pierre Bénézit, France for the contribution of its family since 1910 to the Dictionary of the painters, sculptors, draughtsmen and engravers known under the name of Bénézit Dictionary.
- 2007 - Antonio Paolucci, Italy for a lifetime commitment to preserving culture.
- 2006 - Henk van Os, Netherlands art historian, for a lifetime commitment to teaching art.
- 2005 - Philippe de Montebello, Director of the Metropolitan Museum of Art, New York, United States, for a lifetime commitment to art.
- 1996 - Geoffrey Beard, England: Upholsterers & Interior Furnishing in England, 1530-1840
- 1995 - Prof. Alvar Gonzales Palacios, Italy: Il Gusto dei Principi
- 1994 - Anne Crookshank and Desmond Fitzgerald, Ireland: The Watercolours of Ireland
- 1992 - Lucy Wood, England: The Lady Lever Art Gallery: Catalogue of Commodes
- 1991 - Tom Crispin, England: The Windsor Chair
- 1990 - Dr Ulrich Leben, Germany: Bernard Molitor, 1755-1833
- 1989 - Walter Leidtke, USA: The Royal Horse and Rider
- 1988 - Marcelle Baby-Papion, France: Les Retables niçois des XVe et XVIe siècles peints par Louis Brea
- 1987 - Dr Roland Dorn, Germany: ″Décoration″ - Vincent van Goghs Werkreihe für das Gelbe Haus in Arles
- 1986 - Jörg Martin Merz, Germany: Pietro da Cortonas Entwicklung zum Maler des römischen Hochbarock
- 1985 - Dr Joannes R ter Molen, Netherlands: Von Vianen-En Utrechtse Familie van Silvermeden mit en internationale Faam
- 1984 - Nicola Gordon Bow, Ireland: The life and work of Harry Clarke
- 1983 - Edson Armi, USA: Masons and Sculptures in Romanesque Burgundy
- 1982 - Marianne Roland Michel, France: Jacques de Lajoue et l'Art Rocaille
- 1981 - Geneviève Aitken, France: Les Peintres et le Théatre autour de 1900 à Paris
- 1980 - Norman Bryson, England: Paintings as Signs: Word and Image in French Painting of the Ancien Régime
- 1979 - Bertrand Jaeger, Switzerland: Essai de classification et datation des scarabées Menkhéperre
- 1978 - Claire Lindgren, USA: Classical Art Forms and Celtic Mutations
- 1977 - Penelope Eames, England: Furniture in France and England from the Twelfth to the Fifteenth Century

== See also ==
- List of history awards
