= Francis Stephen Award =

The Francis Stephen Award (German: Franz Stephan Preis; French: Prix Franz Stephan) is an international scientific honor given to researchers in the humanities and social sciences. It is awarded every two or three years by the Österreichische Gesellschaft zur Erforschung des 18. Jahrhunderts (Austrian Society of 18th-Century Studies).

== History ==
Created in 2000, the Francis Stephen Award, endowed with €1500, pays homage to Francis I, the husband of the Empress Maria-Theresa, and her interest in Austrian science, arts and culture. It honors works of excellence written in German, French or English about the 18th century or the Habsburg monarchy. The award ceremony takes place at the University of Vienna.

== Selection ==
The board of directors of the society decide on the value of the submitted works in a multi-stage assessment process with the help of specialist consultants who have been designated thematically. The consultants include academics and interdisciplinary specialists of the 18th century.

== Recipients ==
Years	Winners	Countries	Works awarded
2020	Benedikt Stimmer; Julia Ackermann; Doris Gruber	Austria; Austria; Austria	Zivilisierung durch Sprache? Die Verbreitung des Deutschen als Ausdruck einer habsburgischen „Zivilisierungsmission“ in Galizien 1772–1790; Zwischen Vorstadtbühne, Hoftheater und Nationalsingspiel: Die Opéra comique in Wien 1768–1783; Frühneuzeitlicher Wissenswandel. Die Kometenerscheinungen von 1577/1578, 1680/1681 und 1743/44 in der Druckpublizistik des Heilgien Römischen Reichs Deutscher Nation
2017	Thérence Carvalho; Stephan Kurz	France; Austria	La physiocratie dans l'Europe des Lumières. Circulation et réception d'un modèle de réforme de l'ordre juridique et social; Gebundene Korrespondenzen. Gattungs- und Mediengeschichte von Briefromanen des 18. Jahrhunderts
2014	Klaas Van Gelder; Tobias Heinrich	Belgium; Austria / United Kingdom	Regime Change at a Distance. Austria and the Southern Netherlands following the War of the Spanish Succession (1716-1725); Leben lesen. Zur Theorie der Biographie um 1800
2012	Irene Kubiska; Matthias Mansky	Austria; Austria	„Zwischen Anspruch und Gnade“ – Die Supplikationen Wiener Hofbediensteter an den Kaiser in der Mitte des 18. Jahrhunderts; Cornelius von Ayrenhoff. Eine Monographie
2009	Claire Mádl; Petra Peska; Marion Romberg	France; Austria; Austria	L’écrit, le livre et la publicité. Les engagements d’un aristrocrate éclaire de Boheme: Franz Anton Hartig (1758-1797); Náměšť na Hané – eine Baumonographie; Die Welt in Österreich. 57 Beispiele barocker Erdteil-Allegorien
2007	Joachim Bürgschwentner; Jakob Wührer	Austria; Austria	Die Penal Laws in Irland 1691-1778 Gesetzestexte, Auswirkungen, Debatten; Kindsmörderinnen vor dem Landgericht Lambach. Sechs Frauen zwischen sozialer Wirklichkeit und normativem Anspruch von Obrigkeit und sozialem Umfeld in der ersten Hälfte des 18. Jahrhunderts
2005	Ines Peper; Thomas Wallnig; Anna Bauer	Austria; Austria; Austria	Konvertiten im Umkreis des Wiener Hofes um 1700; Studien zu Herkunft und Bildungswegvon Bernhard Pez OSB vor 1709; Spanische Übersetzerinnen der Illustración 1750-1830: Eine Spurenanalyse
2002	Huberta-Alexandra Weigl; Oliver Hochadel	Austria; Austria	Die Klosteranlagen Jakob Prandtauers; Öffentliche Wissenschaft Elektrizität in der deutschen Aufklärung
2000	Johannes Frimmel; Christoph Gnant; Michael Hammerschmid	Austria; Austria; Austria	Literarisches Leben in Melk Ein Kloster zur Zeit Josephs II. im kulturellen Umbruch; Die Panisbriefe Josephs II. Studien und Quellen; Johann Karl Wezel

== Bibliography ==
- Jahrbuch der Österreichischen Gesellschaft zur Erforschung des 18. Jahrhunderts (ISSN 1015-406X).

== See also ==
- Francis I, Holy Roman Emperor
- List of history awards
- List of general awards in the humanities
- List of social sciences awards
