= John Maxwell Hamilton =

American journalist

- Born: March 28, 1947 (age 79); Evanston, Illinois, U.S.
- Education: Marquette University; Boston University; George Washington University
- Occupations: Journalist, public servant, and educator
- Writing career
- Notable works: Manipulating the Masses: Woodrow Wilson and the Birth of American Propaganda; Entangling Alliances: How The Third World Shapes our Lives
- Notable awards: Donald L. Shaw Senior Scholar Award in 2023, Freedom Forum's Administrator of the Year Award in 2003, Goldsmith Prize
- Website: faculty.lsu.edu/johnhamilton/biography.php

John Maxwell Hamilton (born March 28, 1947) is a journalist, public servant, and educator. He is a Boyd Professor, the highest academic rank at Louisiana State University, and holds the Hopkins P. Breazeale Professorship in the Manship School of Mass Communication. He is also a columnist for RealClearPolitics.

== Career ==
Hamilton is the author or coauthor of eight books and editor of many more. Two of his more recent books are Manipulating the Masses: Woodrow Wilson and the Birth of American Propaganda and Journalism’s Roving Eye: A History of American Foreign Reporting. Each of them won the Goldsmith Prize among other awards. His other books include Edgar Snow: A Biography and the lighthearted Casanova Was A Book Lover: And Other Naked Truths and Provocative Curiosities about the Writing, Selling, and Reading of Books. The French 75, the story of a cannon, a cocktail, and propaganda appeared in 2024.

As a journalist, Hamilton reported in the United States and abroad for the Milwaukee Journal, the Christian Science Monitor, and ABC radio. He was a longtime commentator for MarketPlace, broadcast nationally by Public Radio International. His work has appeared in the New York Times, the Washington Post, Politico, Foreign Affairs, and The Nation, among other publications.

In government, Hamilton oversaw nuclear non-proliferation issues for the House Foreign Affairs Committee, served in the State Department during the Carter administration as special assistant to the head of the U.S. foreign aid program in Asia, and managed a World Bank program to educate Americans about economic development. He served in Vietnam as a Marine Corps platoon commander and in Okinawa as a reconnaissance company commander.

In his twenty years as an LSU administrator, Hamilton was founding dean of the Manship School and the university's executive vice-chancellor and provost. While he was dean, the Manship School created a doctoral degree devoted to media and public affairs, and launched the Reilly Center for Media & Public Affairs and a related opinion research facility. The number of majors more than doubled as did the size of the faculty and staff; the school's endowment more than sextupled.

In the 1980s, Hamilton established a foreign news project for the Society of Professional Journalists and for the American Society of Newspaper editors. The National Journal said in the 1980s that Hamilton shaped public opinion about the complexity of U.S.-Third World relations probably "more than any other single journalist." For many years, Hamilton was on the board of the Lamar Corporation, the largest outdoor advertising company (by number of outdoor signs) in the United States.

In 2023, Hamilton won the Donald L. Shaw Senior Scholar Award for excellence in journalism history, given by the Association for Education in Journalism and Mass Communication's History Division, and the Sidney Kobre Award for Lifetime Achievement in Journalism History, the highest honor of the American Journalism History Association. He received the Freedom Forum's Administrator of the Year Award in 2003. He has received funding from the Carnegie and Ford Foundations, among others. In 2002 he was a Shorenstein Fellow at Harvard University's Kennedy School of Government. He has served twice as a Pulitzer Prize jurist. Hamilton is a member of the Council of Foreign Relations and the Overseas Press Club. Hamilton serves on the board of the International Center for Journalists, of which he is treasurer.

Hamilton earned his bachelor's and master's degrees in journalism from Marquette and Boston University respectively, and a doctorate in American Civilization from George Washington University.

== Awards ==
- Sidney Kobre Award for Lifetime Achievement in Journalism History
- Donald L. Shaw Senior Scholar Award, Association for Education in Journalism and Mass Communication's History Division, 2023
- Two-time winner of the Goldsmith Prize
- Two-time winner of Book of the Year Award, American Journalism Historians Association
- Book of the year, History Division, Association for Education in Journalism and Mass Communication
- Culbert Family Book Prize for Publications on Media History
- Tankard Book Award, Association for Education in Journalism and Mass Communication
- Unsung Hero Award, selected by LSU Martin Luther King Commemorative Committee, 2006
- Omicron Delta Kappa, National Leadership Honorary Society, inducted 2004
- Freedom Forum Journalism Administrator of the Year, 2003

== Publications ==
1. The French 75
2. Main Street America and the Third World
3. Entangling Alliances: How The Third World Shapes our Lives
4. Edgar Snow: A Biography
5. Hold the Press: The Inside Story on Newspapers (with co-author George Krimsky)
6. Casanova Was a Book Lover: And Other Naked Truths and Provocative Curiosities About the Writing, Selling, and Reading of Books
7. Journalism's Roving Eye: A History of American Newsgathering Abroad
8. The Washington Post, "Happy 100th birthday, information warfare: How World War I led to modern propaganda and surveillance"
9. The Washington Post, "In 2016, we're going to campaign like its 1916"
10. The Conversation, "Why you should care about the 'Third Dimension' of government information"
11. The Conversation, "The sinking of the Lusitania: how the British won American hearts and minds"
12. The New York Times, "All the President's Propaganda"
13. Manipulating the Masses: Woodrow Wilson and the Birth of American Propaganda
14. Public Service or Propaganda? How Americans Evaluate Political Advocacy by Executive Agencies
15. The Natural History of the News: An Epigenetic Study
16. Herbert Corey’s Great War: A Memoir of World War I by the American Reporter Who Saw It All
