= Jeanne Sheehy =

Irish art historian

Jeanne Iseult Sheehy
- Born: 15 September 1939; Dublin, Ireland
- Died: 28 September 1999 (aged 60)
- Education: University College Dublin

Jeanne Sheehy (15 September 1939 – 28 September 1999) was an Irish art historian.

== Personal life and work ==
Jeanne Iseult Sheehy was born to Edward Sheehy, a distinguished critic, and Anna Kelly, a graphic artist in September 1939 in Dublin. They had one other son David, a picture restorer. She was educated through Irish at Eccles St. Dominican convent before going, in 1957, to University College Dublin to study French and English literature. She graduated with an arts degree in 1960. After graduation Sheehy studied art history at the École du Louvre from 1961 to 1963 and also worked as an assistant. She went on to teach in the UK at Loughborough and Newport Art Colleges. Before going back to college, Sheehy also worked for Donald Davies as a woven fabric designer in Enniskerry, County Wicklow.

In 1968, Sheehy went back to college to study art historical completing her M.Litt. in 1971 in Trinity College Dublin under Anne Crookshank. Her thesis was on Walter Osborne and she worked on the catalogue of the exhibition of his work in the NGI, Dublin, and the Ulster Museum, Belfast (1983–4). From 1970 to 1973 Sheehy was both research assistant and co-author of Fr Cyril Barrett SJ. They worked on chapters on the visual arts (1850–1922) in A new history of Ireland and collaborated on the catalogue to the Cork exhibition, 19th century Irish art (1991). In 1975, she moved to Oxford to lecturer. In 1983, Sheehy because the principal lecturer, at Oxford Brookes University (formerly Oxford Polytechnic). Sheehy was a founder member of the Association of Irish Art Historians. She gave the annual lecture in May 1985. Sheehy helped to conserve Irish monuments despite moving to England and similarly helped to conserve buildings in the UK. She was on the committee of the Society of Architectural Historians of Great Britain, the Victorian group of the Oxford Architectural and Historical Society and was a member of the Oxford diocesan advisory committee on the care of churches.

She retired months before her death which was on 28 September 1999 of Amyloidosis. She is buried at Kilmacanogue church, County Wicklow.

== Writing ==
- Walter Osborne (1983)
- Irish Art and Architecture: From Prehistory to the Present (1993)
- J.J.McCarthy and the Gothic Revival in Ireland (1977)
- The Rediscovery of Ireland's Past: the Celtic Revival 1830-1930 (1980)
- Walter Osborne: 1859-1903 (Lives of Irish Artists) (1991)
- Kingsbridge Station (Gatherum series) (1973)
- Lively Irishmen: the Ruskinian tradition in Ireland, Irish Arts Review, iii, no 4 (winter 1986), 66–9.
- The education of Irish women artists’ in Irish women artists, NGI exhibition catalogue, 1987
- The flight from Kensington: British artists at the Antwerp Academy, Art History, xx (1997), 124–53

== Sources ==
- The Independent, 7 Oct. 1999;
- Society of Architectural Historians of Great Britain Newsletter, no. 72 (spring 2001) (obit.)
