= Anne Crookshank =

Anne Crookshank HRHA
- Born: 3 January 1927; Belfast, County Antrim, Northern Ireland
- Died: 18 October 2016 (aged 89); Milford, County Donegal, Ireland
- Resting place: Bank Cemetery, Ramelton, County Donegal
- Education: Trinity College, Dublin; Courtauld Institute, London

Anne Olivia Crookshank HRHA (3 January 1927 – 18 October 2016) was a pioneering Irish art historian, and emeritus professor of the history of art at Trinity College Dublin, the department she established in 1966.

== Early life ==
Crookshank was born in Belfast, the middle of three daughters to Henry Crookshank and Eileen Mary “Kitty” Somerville (née Lodge). Crookshank spent the first five years of life in India where her father was engaged in geographical survey work in the central provinces. Crookshank moved around quite a bit in her early days, including spells in Carlisle, London and Fethard in Tipperary. Crookshank studied at Alexandra College for a year before furthering her studies in history at Trinity College, Dublin. She then attended the Courtauld Institute under Anthony Blunt, where she wrote her thesis on the drawings of George Romney, before gaining her first employment at the Tate Gallery.

== Career ==
Upon leaving the Tate she took up a position at the Courtauld Institute's Witt Library before her appointment as Keeper of Art at the Belfast Museum and Gallery in 1957. Crookshank spent much of her early years in Belfast building a contemporary art collection with an international standing, although her purchases did not always meet with the approval of a conservative Belfast public, with some City Fathers calling her "the whore of Babylon". However it was in Belfast that she first became acquainted with Deborah Brown, who was to remain a close friend for the remainder of her life.

Crookshank was an active member of the Irish Georgian Society for more than fifty years, and it was there that she was to meet her long time collaborator Desmond Fitzgerald, the Knight of Glin. Their first collaboration was on a landscape exhibition in 1963, which was shown both North and South of the border. Together they set out to educate the public and themselves in Irish Art History, beginning with the publication of The Painters of Ireland c.1660–1920 in 1978. In 1994, Crookshank and Fitzgerald won the CINOA Prize for the companion publication The Watercolours of Ireland.

In 1966 Crookshank began a long journey to reassess the place of Irish art in the World by establishing Ireland's first art history faculty at Trinity College, Dublin. She travelled the length and breadth of Ireland to rediscover lost artists and paintings, firmly establishing the history of Irish art within a wider European context. Crookshank was elected a Fellow of Trinity College in 1978 and as honorary member of the Royal Hibernian Academy in 1985. Crookshank sat on many committees including the Art Committee of the Arts Council of Northern Ireland, National College of Art and Design, the Hugh Lane Gallery, and the Stamp Design Advisory Committee in the Republic. She was also one of a select few responsible for setting up and managing the ROSC exhibitions of international modern art in the period spanning from 1967 until 1988.

== Death and legacy ==
Crookshank died in Áras Uí Dhomhnaill Nursing Home, Milford after a long illness, in the autumn of 2016. She was survived by her sister Helen and several nieces and nephews. By the time of her death she was amongst the leading art-historians in Ireland. She bequeathed her research archive to the Art History Faculty at Trinity College. In 1985, in honour of her contribution to Irish art history her colleagues established a travel-scholarship in her name.

== Other sources ==
- "The Anne Crookshank Travel Prize". Irish Arts Review (1984-1987). 2 (3): 59. 1985. JSTOR 20491805.
- Fenlon, Jane; Figgis, Nicola; Marshall, Catherine (September 1987). New perspectives: Studies in art history in honour of Anne Crookshank. Irish Academic. ISBN 978-0716524083.
