= Eleanor Blum =

Eleanor Blum (March 18, 1909 – July 7, 2011) is the author of scientific papers and bibliographies. She has a PhD in the communication sciences. Blum was the librarian for the communication library at the University of Illinois, UIUC College of Media from 1953 to 1978. She was also professor emerita of Library Science at the University of Illinois Urbana-Champaign.

== Bibliographies ==
- Basic books in the mass media
- Mass media bibliography: an annotated guide to books and journals for research and reference
- Paperbound books in the United States in 1955: a survey of content

== Papers ==
- BOOK PUBLISHING - WHAT IT IS, WHAT IT DOES
- HISTORY OF BOOK PUBLISHING IN UNITED-STATES .1. CREATION OF AN INDUSTRY 1630–1865
- HISTORY OF BOOK PUBLISHING IN THE UNITED-STATES .3. GOLDEN-AGE BETWEEN 2 WARS 1920–1940
- A HISTORY OF BOOK PUBLISHING IN THE UNITED-STATES, VOL 4, THE GREAT CHANGE, 1940–1980
- BOOK SELECTION AND CENSORSHIP IN SIXTIES
- THE USE OF BOOKS AND LIBRARIES
- PAPERBACK BOOK PUBLISHING - A SURVEY OF CONTENT
- FLIGHT FROM REASON - ESSAYS ON INTELLECTUAL FREEDOM IN ACADEMY, PRESS, AND LIBRARY
- INTERNATIONAL ENCYCLOPEDIA OF COMMUNICATIONS
- WOMEN, COMMUNICATION, AND CAREERS
- PRINTED BOOK IN AMERICA
- ONE BOOK-5 WAYS - THE PUBLISHING PROCEDURES OF 5 UNIVERSITY PRESSES

...
