= Leadership in History Awards =

American award for state and local history

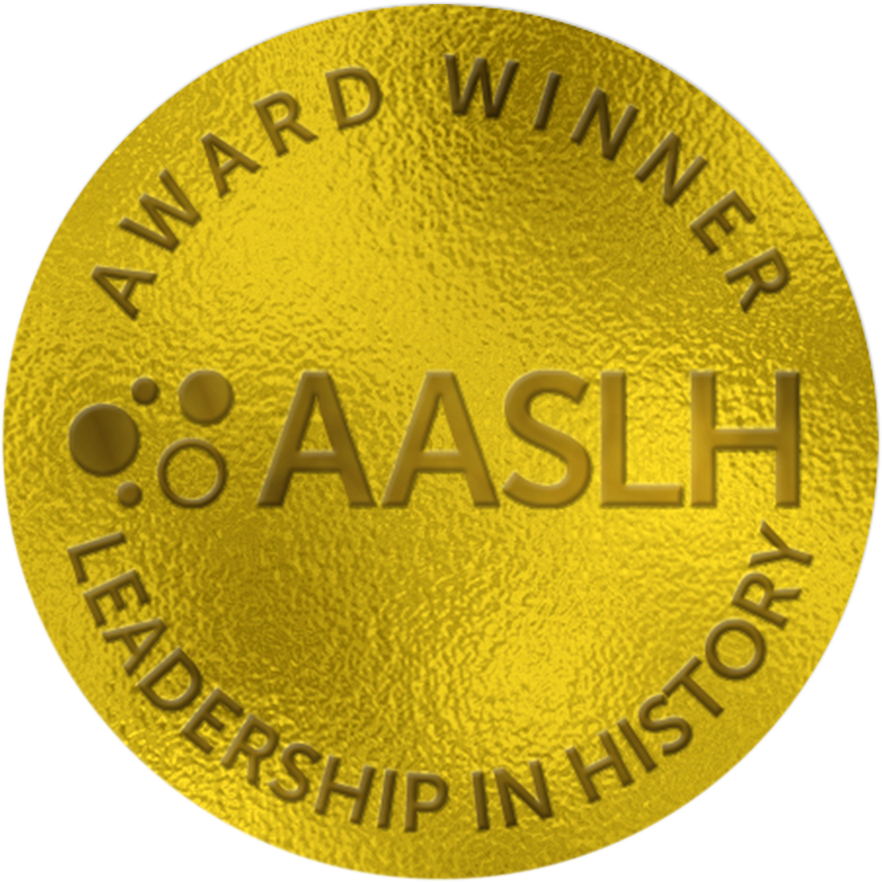
AASLH Leadership in History Awards logo

The Leadership in History Awards, established by American Association for State and Local History (AASLH) in 1945, recognize projects, programs, publications, and individuals that meet standards in collecting, preserving, and interpreting state and local history to make history meaningful. These awards include the main Award of Excellence for projects such as exhibits, educational programs, civic engagement efforts, publications, and lifetime achievement. Special awards include the Albert B. Corey Award, which honors primarily volunteer-run organizations, and the History in Progress Award, which recognizes exceptional scholarship or creativity. Awards cover categories like large press and small press local history books and history practice books. Nominations require detailed documentation, including critical reviews and impact statements, and winners are selected by a committee through majority vote.

== Award types ==
- Award of Excellence: The main award for a variety of projects. Recognizes projects and individuals in various categories including exhibits, public programming, and publications.
- Award of Distinction: Given infrequently for long and distinguished individual service to the field of state and local history.
- Albert B. Corey Award: Honors volunteer-operated historical organizations nominated from Award of Excellence winners.
- History in Progress Award: Given to an Award of Excellence winner for extraordinary scholarship, creativity, or entrepreneurship.
- Publication Awards: Include categories like Best Large Press Local History Book, Best Small Press/Independent Author Local History Book, and Best History Practice Book, each judged on contribution, research rigor, and presentation.
