= CINOA =

CINOA (Confédération Internationale des Négociants en Oeuvres d'Art, or International Confederation of Art and Antique Dealers' Associations) is a Brussels-based international federation of antique and art dealers. It was founded in 1935 and represents five thousand dealers from thirty-two art and antique associations in twenty-two countries. (Note: Australia, Austria, Belgium, Czech Republic, Denmark, France, Germany, Ireland, Italy, Netherlands, New Zealand, Norway, Poland, Portugal, Romania, Russia & CIS, Spain, South Africa, Sweden, Switzerland, the United Kingdom, USA.)

== History ==
CINOA was founded in 1935.

Since 1976, CINOA has been awarding a yearly CINOA Prize to art historians or major art market players "in recognition of an academic publication or a remarkable contribution to furthering the cultural preservation through art works in a CINOA member country".

In 2021, CINOA alerted its members on the circulation of cultural artifacts looted from Afghanistan in the art world, a warning to avoid being linked to terrorists' opaque financing montages.

== Description ==
Membership requires to adhere to strict quality and expertise standards. Dealers who are affiliated with CINOA through their art and antique trade associations may display the CINOA logo as support of the CINOA charter and guidelines.

The goal of CINOA are to encourage high ethical standards within the trade, disseminate practical information on the art market, and facilitate legitimate circulation of artworks throughout the world.

== Members ==
- Syndicat national des antiquaires (France - since 2016)
- International Association of Professional Numismatists (since 2023)
