= American Journalism Historians Association =

Media history society in the United States

- Abbreviation: AJHA
- Established: 1981; 45 years ago
- Founders: Founding members: Donald Avery; Maurine Beasley; Michael Buchholz; Lloyd Chiasson; Sidney Kobre; Frank Krompak; Robert Lance; Michael Murray; Darwin Payne; Alf Pratte; William David Sloan
- Founded at: Southern Methodist University; Dallas, Texas, U.S.
- Type: Nonprofit
- Tax ID no.: 58-1975323
- Legal status: Historical society
- Purpose: Historical preservation
- Headquarters: The University of Texas at Arlington
- Location: Arlington, Texas, United States
- Coordinates: 32.73049°N 97.11514°W
- President: Mike Conway
- Executive Director: Erika Pribanic-Smith
- First Vice President: Tracy Lucht
- Second Vice President: Debra van Tuyll
- Website: ajhaonline.org

Founded in 1981, the American Journalism Historians Association (AJHA) seeks to advance education and research in mass communication history. Through its annual meeting, regional conferences, committees, awards, speakers and publications, members work to raise historical standards and ensure that all scholars and students recognize the vast importance of media history and apply this knowledge to the advancement of society.

== Meetings and conferences ==
=== Annual meeting ===
The organization sponsors an annual fall meeting. Approximately 120 historians attend and participate in discussions surrounding teaching and research in media history. Throughout the meeting, scholars present peer-reviewed research, participate in topical panel discussions and generate ideas for articles and books. At the annual meeting, scholars also participate vigorously in a silent auction that generates thousands of dollars for graduate student aid.

=== Southeast Symposium ===
Media history scholars from across the Southeast gather each February for the annual AJHA Southeast Symposium. The conference is designed to promote graduate and undergraduate research and provides a scholarly forum for student research presentations and discussions.

=== AJHA-AEJMC joint conference ===
The AJHA partners with the History Division of AEJMC to sponsor a spring conference in New York City. This interdisciplinary gathering accepts submissions in all areas of journalism and communication history from all time periods and welcomes scholars from all academic disciplines and stages of their academic careers.

== Task Force on History in the Curriculum ==
This AJHA committee works to encourage the study of history in graduate and undergraduate mass communication programs. Some of its actions include:

- Encouraging all schools to offer an undergraduate history course and require it of their majors
- Encouraging graduate schools to recognize that history is as important as theory, social science research or any other area of graduate study
- Evaluating the history curricula in doctoral programs.

== Speakers bureau ==
The AJHA Speakers Bureau features members who share their expertise and knowledge with the media and local and national organizations. The diversity of the organization's membership enables its bureau to provide a wealth of educational resources on a wide variety of topics related to mass communication history.

== Publications ==
American Journalism (ISSN 0882-1127), the AJHA's quarterly peer-reviewed journal, publishes articles, research notes, book reviews, and correspondence dealing with media history. Recent editions of American Journalism are available via the EBSCO database. Contributions may focus on social, economic, intellectual, political or legal issues. American Journalism also welcomes articles that treat the history of communication in general; the history of broadcasting, advertising, and public relations; the history of media outside the United States; and theoretical issues in the literature or methods of media history.

The Intelligencer is the quarterly newsletter of the AJHA. It includes news about the organization and its members as well as research and conference updates.

== Awards ==
- Sidney Kobre Award for Lifetime Achievement in Journalism History - The organization's highest honor recognizes individuals with an exemplary record of sustained achievement in media history through teaching, research, professional activities, or other contributions to the field.
- Margaret A. Blanchard Dissertation Prize - Awarded annually for the best doctoral dissertation dealing with mass communication history. A cash award of $500 accompanies the prize.
- AJHA History Award - Recognizes a practicing journalist whose work has been exemplary in the host community of the annual meeting.
- AJHA Teaching Awards - Honors excellence in the teaching of journalism and mass communication history and recognizes those who make a positive impact on student learning and influence other teachers by example. The award is designed to focus national attention on the importance of teaching in journalism and mass communication history.
- AJHA Book Award - Recognizes the best book in media history as judged by a panel of AJHA members. The book award winner is honored at the closing gala of the annual meeting.

During the annual meeting, the AJHA recognizes exceptional peer-reviewed research papers in several categories: faculty paper, student paper, conference paper, minority paper, and women's interest paper. A panel of judges also presents an award to the single best article published during the year in American Journalism.

== See also ==
- Center for Intercultural Dialogue
- List of history awards
