= Female Husbands: A Trans History =

2020 book by Jen Manion

- Author: Jen Manion
- Language: English
- Genre: History
- Published: 2020
- Publisher: Cambridge University Press
- ISBN: 9781108652834
- Website: jenmanion.com

Female Husbands: A Trans History is a history book about female husbands by Jen Manion, a professor of History and Sexuality, Women's and Gender Studies at Amherst College, published in 2020 by Cambridge University Press. The book won the Best Book prize from the British Association of Victorian Studies and was a finalist for the Lawrence W. Levine Award.

== Synopsis ==
Manion reviews United States and United Kingdom historical material from 1746 to 1910, including newspapers and court records, to recount the lives of more than a dozen people who were assigned female and interacted with society as men, including some who married women.

== Reception ==
In the Los Angeles Review of Books, Samuel Clowes Huneke writes, "A self-described 'lifelong LGBTQ rights advocate' and professor of history at Amherst College, Manion created not only a strikingly original portrait of individuals who, as [Manion] puts it, 'transed' gender in the 18th and 19th centuries, but also an impassioned cri de coeur for trans rights." In a review for The Guardian, Grace Lavery writes, "Attempts have been made to argue that 'reclaiming' transgender ancestors is ahistorical. Female Husbands demands a rethink of this position."

James Yukiko Mulder writes for Women's Review of Books, "Manion's skill and care as a narrator of this story is palpable throughout the book. In Female Husbands, these figures from the historical past are shown to be complex, often ingenious individuals who labored to maintain the stability of their various social and economic positions and proved resilient when their lives and bodies were placed under public scrutiny." Eileen Gonzalez writes for Foreword Reviews, "Public reactions to outed female husbands were often hostile and mocking. Manion is sympathetic and respectful, according them the humanity they have long been denied."

In The English Historical Review, Emily Rutherford writes, "Manion is sensitive to the part that female husbands played in shoring up white, imperial heteronormativity: showing how a respectable working-class identity was much less available to African-American female husbands, and how female husbands participated in a genocidal settler-colonial project that, among other things, eradicated Indigenous North American ways of understanding gender variance. As more scholars pursue research along these lines, their findings might frustrate our desires to find stories about gender and sexuality in the past that affirm our present-day identity categories and politics." In a Journal of Victorian Culture review, Billie-Gina Thomason writes "Female Husbands demonstrates that gender nonconformity and 'transing gender' is not a new phenomenon and highlights how much more can and will be done to historicize trans lives." Cay Wren writes for Manhattan Book Review, "The predominance of trans history has come from a place of asylum records and violent newspaper headlines. This inherited trauma is still being incrementally rewritten in the LGBTQ community today, and Manion's literary treatment of the historical figures found in the pages of this book I believe will serve as a crucial continuation of that healing."

In a review for History Today, Catherine Baker writes, "When Manion refers to the book's subjects as 'they', it is not to cram them into a 21st-century non-binary identity, but to convey the boundlessness with which the 20th-century writer Leslie Feinberg wrote of gender: to force them into female categories they demonstrably rejected in life traduces their efforts, yet too many of the husbands moved between male and female gender expressions for 'he' to apply to them all. By holding 'the gender that people embraced, negotiated and became during their lives' as the closest historians can come to truth, Manion's writing is a beacon for representing gender variance in the past." In the London Review of Books, Sharon Marcus writes, "Then as now, conservatives feared that the many would follow the few. In 1837, a religious conservative in Boston warned that what Manion calls 'transing' might 'become universal'. In the 1860s, US states and cities began to enact laws that made it a crime for women to dress as men and men as women." In The Guardian, Gabrielle Bellot writes, "While Manion's book is only a narrow geographic snapshot of such figures, it underscores their prevalence in the past, as well as the still-radical notion that transgender people, like me, are worthy of love and respect."

== See also ==
- Female husband
