= Charles Hamilton (female husband) =

Husband convicted in 1746 of being a woman

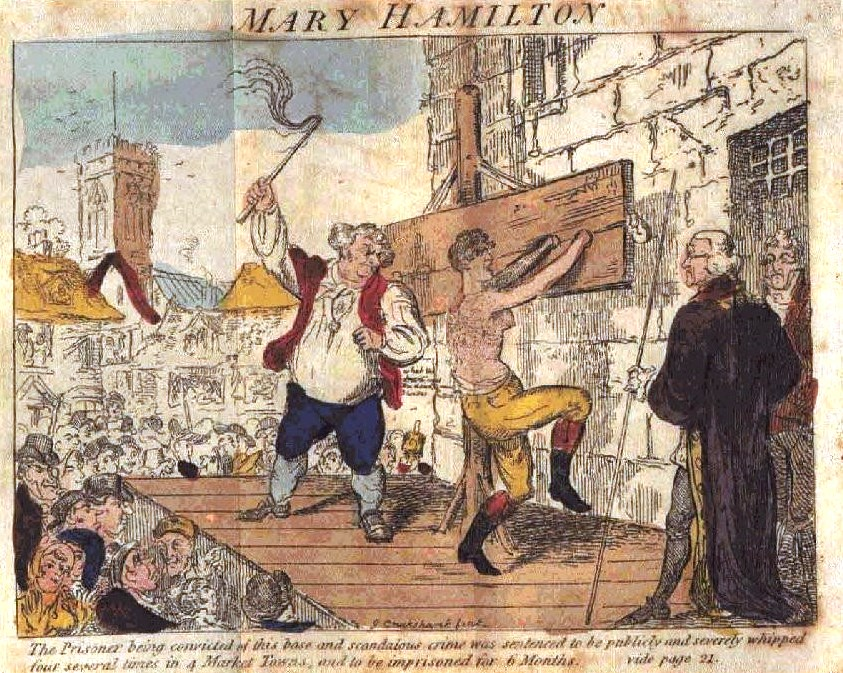
- An 1813 fanciful illustration of Hamilton being whipped, wearing male boots and breeches, but naked from the waist up.
- Born: Mary Hamilton c.1721–24 Somerset, England
- Died: unknown
- Occupation: Quack doctor
- Years active: 1746

Charles Hamilton was an English 18th-century female husband. Named Mary Hamilton at birth, and initially brought up a girl, they took the name Charles and started presenting as male at age 14. In 1746, while living as a man, they married Mary Price. After Price reported she was suspicious of Hamilton's manhood to local authorities, Hamilton was prosecuted for vagrancy, and was sentenced in 1746 to a public whipping in four towns and to six months imprisonment with hard labour.

While surviving records of the case indicate that Hamilton was prosecuted for vagrancy, the fact that there had been penetrative sex and sexual intimacy with Mary Price prompted public opinion to ask for a severe punishment of what was considered as deceitful sexuality.

Newspaper reports at the time claimed that Hamilton had married 13 other women before, and that Price was their fourteenth wife. A 1746 account in the Newgate calendar gave other details.

In the same year, Henry Fielding published a fictionalised account of the case under the title The Female Husband. The term 'Female Husband' became common in the US and British press to document behaviour which would later be stigmatised by sexologists.

Hamilton was not the first documented female husband, but this was the first use of the term to refer to – in the language of the time – a woman who had married another woman whilst purporting to be male.

== Biography ==
Mary Hamilton was born in Somerset and grew up in Scotland, the child of William and Mary Hamilton. At the age of 14, Mary began wearing male clothes borrowed from their brother. Charles Hamilton, as Mary then became known, studied with two doctors during their apprenticeship. One of them was Dr Edward Green, who called himself an "operator and occulist" but was known to be a mountebank. Hamilton helped Green produce medical compounds, collect the requisite supplies, and sell cures for various illnesses including cancer, leprosy, fistulas and scurvy.

After serving Dr Edward Green for two to three years, Hamilton transferred to Dr Finley Green for their final apprenticeship year, then worked independently as a quack doctor under the name Charles Hamilton. This involved travelling and selling medicine and medical advice, dressed in "man's apparel": ruffles, breeches, and a periwig. During this period, the Jacobite rising of 1745 against the House of Hanover had occurred. In response, Parliament passed the Dress Act 1746, which forbade the wearing of highland dress in Scotland. While in Scotland, Charle's clothes were viewed as European in contrast to highland styles, which could also be seen as a cultural conscious choice. Travelling meant that Charles could easily change location in case of suspicion, and the work provided a decent living.

Charles became involved with Mary Price, the niece of their landlady, Mary Creed, and the couple married on 16 July 1746 in Wells, Somerset. They travelled together for two months, before Mary Price decided she had been cheated into believing Hamilton was a man and reported her husband to the authorities in Glastonbury. Charles was arrested and tried for fraud. While living together, the couple are reported to have had sexual intercourse several times involving penetration, and historians have questioned how that could be possible. Explanations range from speculating that Price was a virgin ignorant of sexual matters, or that Charles may have used dildos or fingers, leaving Price satisfied for months before she began questioning her husband's manhood.

== The court case ==
In 1746, Charles was brought before the summer quarter sessions in Taunton, Somerset. According to a local newspaper report, "There was a great Debate for some Time in Court about the Nature of her Crime, and what to call it, but at last it was agreed that she should be charged with fraud." At the time of the trial, there was no clear legal procedure to prosecute such cases. The records show that it was not so much the fact that Hamilton dressed and worked as a man that was a problem, but rather the fact of having deceitfully contrived penetrative sex.

Charles was charged under the Vagrancy Act 1744 (17 Geo. 2. c. 5). This act was meant to prosecute lack of employment or vagrancy as a deceitful means of acquiring money. However, as the potential charges under the act were vague and diverse, the act became a way of maintaining social order by restricting mobility and consolidating gender and sexual norms that were not precisely named. During the trial, members of Charles's community wrote a letter to the court clerk asking for severe punishment. They wanted public humiliation and to ensure that Charles would never again be able to live as a man.

=== Depositions ===
==== Charles Hamilton's deposition ====
Charles was born in Somerset, and was initially known as Mary, the daughter of Mary and William Hamilton. Their family later moved to Scotland. When they were fourteen, they used their brother's clothes to pose as a boy, travelled to Northumberland and entered the service of a Dr Edward Green (described in the deposition as a "mountebank") and later of Dr Finley Green. They studied to become a "quack doctor" as an apprentice of the two unlicensed practitioners. In 1746, they moved to Wells and set up a medical practice of their own under the name Charles Hamilton. They met Mary Price, a relative of their landlady, whom they married in July 1746. The marriage lasted for two months before Hamilton's "true sex" was discovered, and Charles was arrested.

==== Mary Price's deposition ====
A deposition from Mary Price says that after the marriage she and Hamilton travelled selling medicines. During the marriage Hamilton "entered her body several times, which made this examinant believe, at first, that the said Hamilton was a real man, but soon had reason to judge that the said Hamilton was not a man, but a woman." When they were in Glastonbury, Price confronted them. Charles admitted the truth to Price, at which point she reported the matter and Hamilton was arrested.

=== Conviction ===
The justices delivered their verdict that "The he or she prisoner at the bar is an uncommon, notorious cheat, and we, the Court, do sentence her, or him, whichever he or she may be, to be imprisoned six months, and during that time to be whipped in the towns of Taunton, Glastonbury, Wells, and Shepton Mallet ..."

The report in the Newgate Calendar concludes "And Mary, the monopoliser of her own sex, was imprisoned and whipped accordingly, in the severity of the winter of the year 1746."

According to Jen Manion, the court case is representative of the pressure exercised by community to trigger a legal response by the courts to punish sexual intimacy outside of marriage, and to stabilize sexual differences in a context where there were no clear legal offences defined by existing laws for cases of female husbands. Hamilton became the first known case of woman imposter cheating a woman in a fraudulent marriage.

=== Newspaper reports ===
In addition to Hamilton's and Price's own depositions, there are several reports of the case in the local newspaper, the Bath Journal. The first of these says that after news of the arrest got out many people visited the prison to get a look at Hamilton, who was very "bold and impudent". It added that "it is publickly talk'd that she has deceived several of the Fair Sex by marrying them." The author promises to "make a further Enquiry" into these allegations for a later report. A subsequent report states that Hamilton was born in Yeovil. Another report says that at the trial the prosecuting attorney, Mr Gold, had alleged in his opening statement that Hamilton had been married fourteen times.

The final report was repeated in the Daily Advertiser on 12 November, where it was probably seen by Henry Fielding.

A few months later the affair was picked up by the US press. The Boston Weekly Post published the story in February 1747, stating the court's difficulty in naming and defining the crime:

Mary Hamilton was try'd for pretending herself a man, and marrying 14 wives, the last of which, Mary Price, deposed in court that she was married to the prisoner and bedded and lived as man and wife for a quarter of a year, during which time she thought the prisoner a man, owing to the prisoner's vile and deceitful practices. After a debate of the nature of the crime and what to call it, it was agreed that she was an uncommon notorious cheat, and sentenced to be publicly whipt

Hamilton's story became a sensation with the stated fact of having 14 wives, which made the story very visible. Readers were left to imagine what the "vile and deceitful practices" could be, as they were not defined precisely.

== Fielding's version: The Female Husband ==
In 1746, Fielding anonymously published a sensational pamphlet, The Female Husband, that gives a different account of Hamilton's life. Fielding was himself the son of a judge and had trained and worked in law, contributing to the establishment of the London police force. The author claims that he had his information "from the mouth" of Hamilton themself. However, it is likely that he never met the person he satirized in his work. He says that they were born in 1721 on the Isle of Man, the daughter of a former army sergeant who had married a woman of property on the island. They had been brought up in the strictest principles of virtue and religion, but were seduced into "vile amours" by their friend Anne Johnson, an enthusiastic Methodist, and "transactions not fit to be mention'd passed between them". When Anne leaves them for a man, Hamilton seeks another female lover. They dress as a man and pretend to be a Methodist preacher. They meet Mrs. Rushford, a wealthy 68-year-old widow who takes them to be a lad of about 18. Tempted by the money they will get as a "husband", Hamilton marries Mrs. Rushford. According to Fielding, they were able to deceive their bride by means "which decency forbids me even to mention". However, the bride eventually discovers Hamilton's sex, and Hamilton is forced to flee.

Hamilton uses various other aliases to marry other women, but is repeatedly forced to flee when the ruse is discovered. In at least three instances they lived for some time unnoticed by their married spouse. Finally, posing as a doctor, they marry Mary Price, a beautiful 18-year-old girl. The marriage is apparently happy until, while Hamilton is visiting Glastonbury, they are recognised by someone from a previous "marriage". Mary cannot believe it, but her mother ensures that Hamilton is arrested and prosecuted. They are sentenced to imprisonment and to four public whippings in the market towns of Somerset. Fielding claims that "on the very evening she had suffered the first whipping, she offered the gaoler money, to procure her a young girl to satisfy her most monstrous and unnatural desires."

Fielding's text was re-published with alterations in 1813, again anonymously, as The surprising adventures of a female husband! Containing the whimsical amours, curious incidents, and diabolical tricks of Miss M. Hamilton, alias Mr. G. Hamilton, alias Minister Bentley, Mr. O'Keefe, alias Mrs. Knight, the Midwife, &c ... This lesser-known version has many alterations including a more sensationalized title and changes to the historical and cultural context. The pamphlet was inexpensive and more than likely purchased by both men and women of different social statuses. Fielding exaggerated and fictionalized parts of the story in order to keep the audience interested and to entice people to read who might not be interested in erotic fiction.

Something interesting about Fielding's version of The Female Husband was his use of pronouns. When Hamilton is passing as a male, Fielding uses 'he/him', a tactic which might seem to cast the author as complicit in the deception. In Fielding's version the reader can be confused by the use of gender: "She had not been long in this city, before she became acquainted with one Mary Price, a girl of about eighteen years of age, and of extraordinary beauty. With this girl, hath this wicked woman since her confinement declared, she was really as much in love, as it was possible for a man ever to be with one of her own sex." Fielding's use grammar here confuses the gender issue; both 'man' and 'her' refer back to Hamilton, or the 'wicked woman' speaking to Fielding from her jail cell. However, in the pamphlet published in the 19th century, the author makes a point of correcting this ambiguity, often adding italics to emphasize the pronoun choice. Not only does the nineteenth-century pamphlet consistently refer to Hamilton with a female pronoun, the author draws attention to the choice by using italics which are only used when a masculine pronoun would be indicated by Hamilton's masculine persona. While in earlier text Fielding does play with the idea that women might find Hamilton attractive because of her femininity, whenever her 'sex' is discovered in his pamphlet, the relationship abruptly ends and unlike the 19th century author, Fielding more subtly exploits the possibilities of suggestion, and manages at the same time to maintain a tone of moral reprimand. It has been argued that Fielding merged the conventions of the criminal biographies that were so popular in his time, with those of the comic marriage plot (a staple of drama that was slowly gaining ground in fiction as well).

=== Authenticity of the accounts ===
Historian Louis Crompton describes Fielding's account as probably "one part fact to ten parts fiction". Sheridan Baker says of the 23 page booklet, "I think it fairly safe to put down the first twenty pages of The Female Husband to pure fiction by Fielding. And in the last three pages, as the record indicates, fiction is not altogether lacking." He dismisses Fielding's claim to have interviewed Hamilton himself, saying that "it seems certain" no such interview took place, and that he was not present at the trial. He notes that many elements of the 'life' of Hamilton as described by Fielding seem to parallel the plots of his novels, and that even the details of the court case, which can be checked against the record, contain elements that are demonstrably false, and probably follow from a misinterpretation of phrases in the newspaper reports. It is possible that Fielding got some details from the prosecuting council Henry Gould (misspelled as 'Mr. Gold' in the newspapers), who was his cousin, but Baker thinks this unlikely, especially as Fielding himself copies the newspapers in misspelling the name 'Gold'. Since details of Hamilton's life as reported by Fielding contradict their sworn deposition, the evidence suggests that Fielding simply elaborated on the newspaper reports, perhaps supplemented by rumours that were circulating about the case.

According to Louis Crompton, Hamilton was only prosecuted for fraudulently marrying Price: there is no record of any other prosecution. Whether any previous marriages ever occurred, or if they were merely a product of local gossip and rumour remains unknown.

=== Broadcast media ===
Fielding's version of the story was adapted into a BBC Radio 4 play of the same name, starring comedian Sandi Toksvig. The play was written by Sheila Hannon and was first broadcast in June 2006.

The 1813 publication by Henry Fielding was the subject of an appraisal in a 2010 episode of PBS' Antiques Roadshow entitled "Naughty or Nice." The publication includes a colour etching attributed, possibly falsely, to George Cruikshank which depicts Hamilton being publicly whipped for their crimes.

== See also ==
- Female husband - other cases of female husbands
