= Female husband =

Woman who marries while living as a man

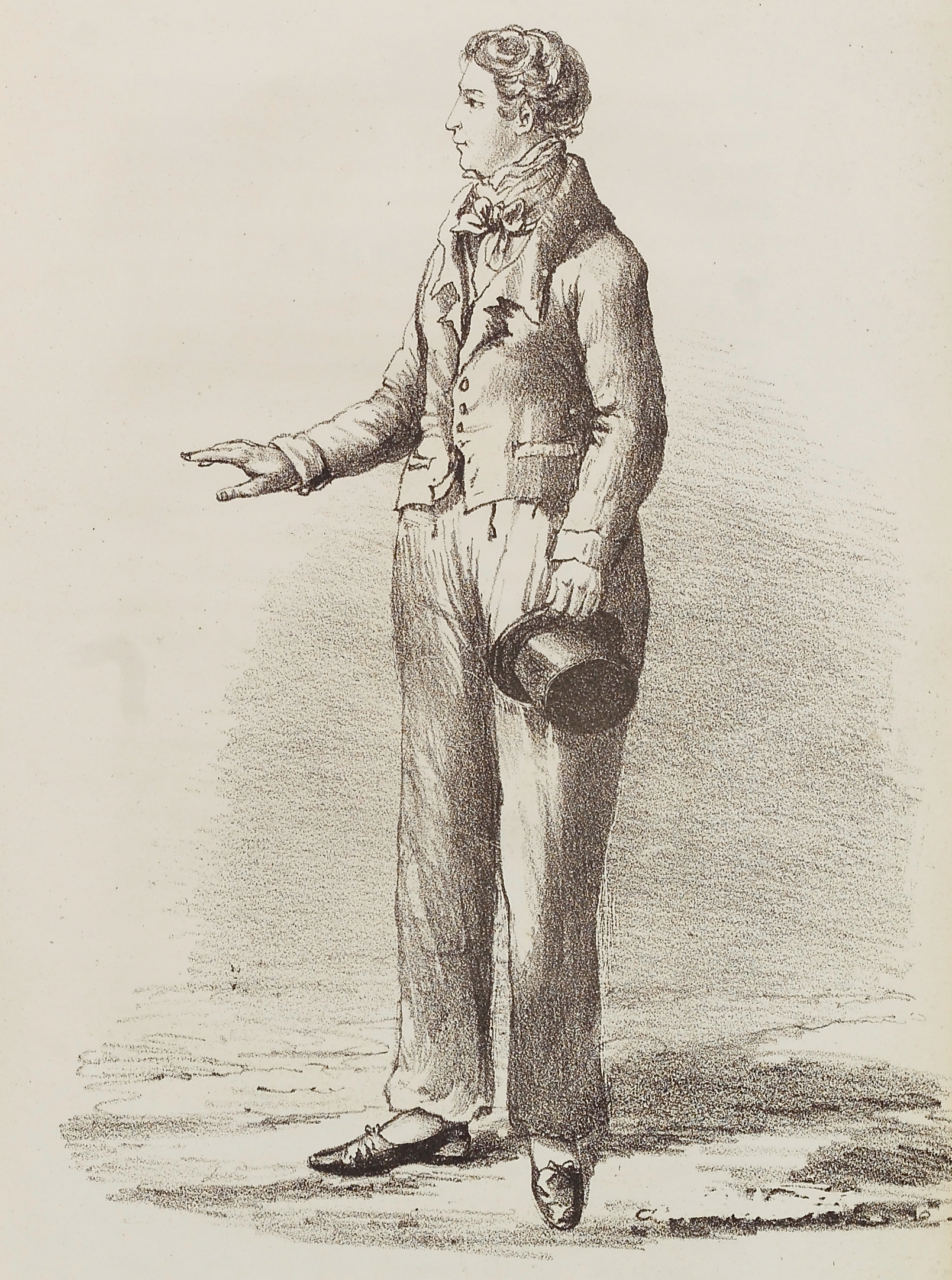
1829 portrait of James Allen, entitled "The Female Husband!"

A female husband is a natal female, living as a man, who marries a woman. The term was used from the seventeenth century, and was popularised in 1746 by Henry Fielding's fictionalised account of the trial of Charles Hamilton, titled The Female Husband.

Prosecutions involving natal females living as men and marrying women were reported in the seventeenth century and eighteenth centuries. In many of these historic instances, the 'female husband' was presented as having deceived the bride and was accused of defrauding her.

== Notable cases of female husbands ==
=== James Howard - 1680 ===
On 12 September 1680, in London, James Howard married Arabella Hunt. Hunt later filed for divorce stating that Howard was of double gender or hermaphrodite, and still married to a man as a woman. After being examined by midwives, Howard was declared a woman "in all her parts". Howard's social status (as gentry) and willingness to abide with the court's order protected them from penalty.

=== Mary Jewit - 1682 ===
The first documented case specifically mentioning the term "female husband" was described in an English broadside The Male and Female Husband of 1682. This recounted the case of an intersex person named Mary Jewit who was abandoned, and who was raised as a girl by a midwife in St Albans. Jewit then worked with the nurse for years under a female identity, until getting a woman pregnant. A judge decided that this act was proof of manhood, and that Jewit had to live as a man and marry the woman. Jewit agreed to do so.

=== Unnamed - 1694 ===
In 1694, Anthony à Wood wrote in a letter:

Appeared at the King's Bench in Westminster hall a young woman in man's apparel, or that personated a man, who was found guilty of marrying a young maid, whose portion he had obtained and was very nigh of being contracted to a second wife. Divers of her love letters were read in court, which occasion'd much laughter. Upon the whole she was ordered to Bridewell to be well whipt and kept to hard labour till further order of the court.

=== Sarah/John Ketson - 1720 ===
In 1720, Sarah Ketson took on the name John and was prosecuted for an alleged attempt to defraud a woman named Ann Hutchinson into marriage. Ketson was eventually convicted.

=== Mary/Charles Hamilton - 1746 ===
At the age of 14, Mary Hamilton took on the name Charles Hamilton, and in 1746 married Mary Price. When Mary became suspicious of Charles's manhood, Hamilton was prosecuted for vagrancy, and was sentenced in 1746 to a whipping and to six months imprisonment.

Henry Fielding published a popular fictionalised account of the case under the title The Female Husband.

=== Sarah Paul/Samuel Bundy - 1759 ===
In 1759, Sarah Paul, going by the name Samuel Bundy, was convicted and sent to Southwark Bridewell for tricking Mary Parlour into marriage and defrauding her of money and apparel. Although it was Parlour who brought the case, that appears to have been under community pressure. Parlour knew of Paul's sex and originally chose to continue their relationship. Neighbours who suspected that they had not consummated the marriage discovered that Paul was not born as a man. Parlour failed to appear at trial, resulting in the magistrate discharging Paul, but not before he ordered their masculine clothing to be burned.

=== James How/Mary East - 1766 ===
James How, born Mary East, was an English tavern owner who lived as a married man from 1732 until 1766, when legal action forced a permanent return to female presentation. How's story was the subject of contemporary newspaper articles, a section in Bram Stoker's Famous Imposters, a song in R.M. Anderson's Songs From The Howling Sea, and a painting in Ria Brodell's Butch Heroes series.

=== James Allen - 1829 ===
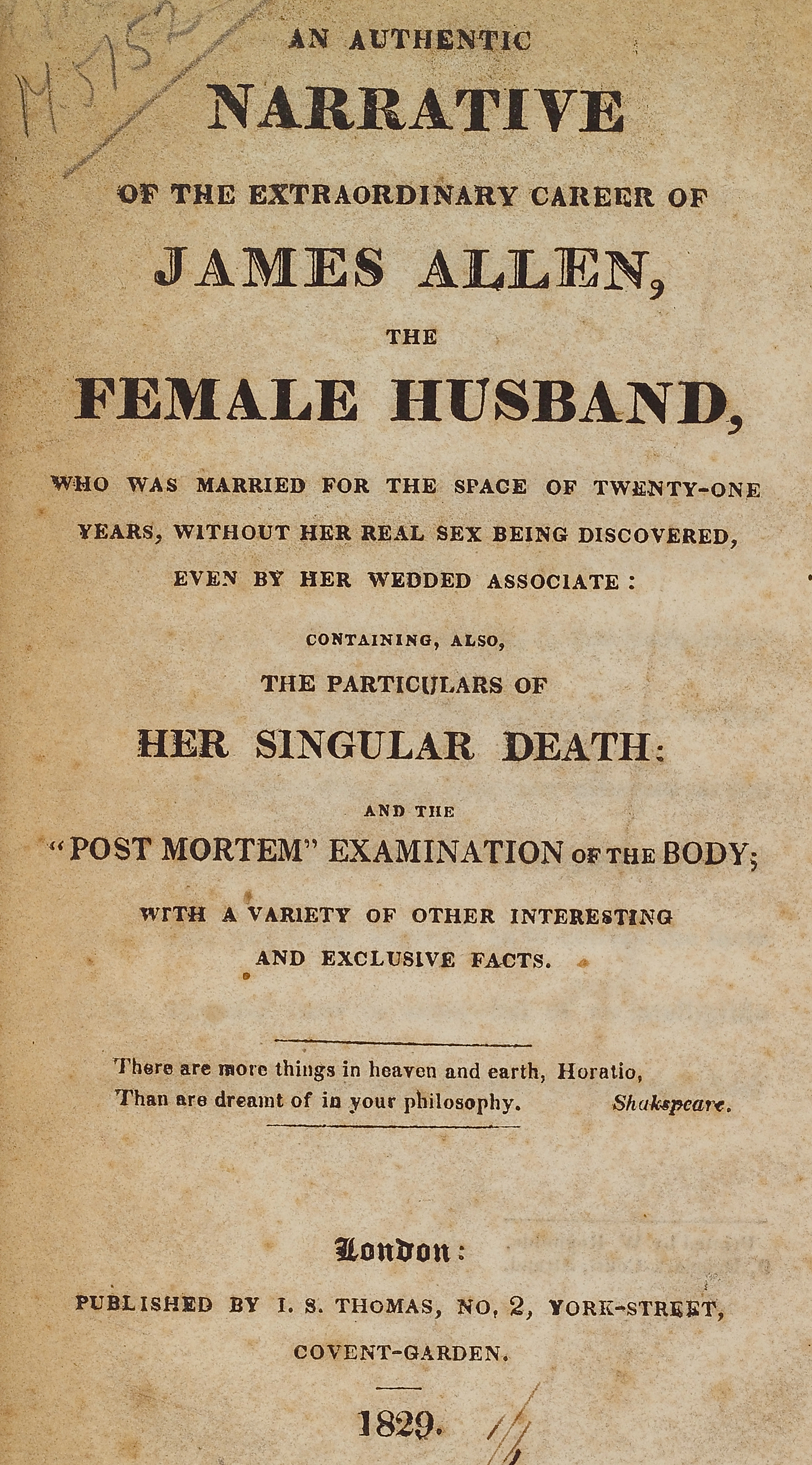
Title page of a contemporary sensational pamphlet reporting the James Allen case

In 1829 it was reported that another female husband, James Allen, had successfully lived as a man without facing prosecution for 21 years. Allen had married Abigail (née Naylor) in 1807 at St Giles' Church, Camberwell. It was only under autopsy at St Thomas' Hospital, London, that his sex was discovered to be female. Abigail said she "was not suspicious of her husband's sex because Allen was uncannily strong". Jen Manion speculates that as Abigail was threatened by her neighbours, she felt that the only way they would leave her alone would be to swear she had no idea. A sensational pamphlet purported to provide the public with "An Authentic Narrative of the Extraordinary Career of James Allen, the Female Husband [...]".

== Women's rights reception ==
The cases of female husbands in general went unnoticed by women's rights activists. The life experience of these female husbands was not seen as something that brought progress, and when they were described it was often in a critical way. Hannah More (1745–1833), although she vowed not to marry and dedicate herself to women's education, believed the superiority of women was shown by their capacity to sacrifice and obey. Accordingly, she did not support women taking on men's roles and becoming "male imitators".

Priscilla Wakefield (1751–1832), a feminist Quaker and writer living in London, ridiculed the idea of a feminine man or a masculine woman, believing in the natural separation of men and women. For her, a woman becoming a man would be a terrible "citizen, husband and father" and would be burdened by "exquisite feeling, delicacy, gentleness and forbearance of female excellence".

== Sources ==
- Crompton, Louis (2006). Homosexuality & civilization. Belknap Press. ISBN 978-0-674-02233-1. OCLC 1088127490.
- Manion, Jen (2020). Female Husbands: A Trans History. Cambridge University Press, United Kingdom. ISBN 978-1-108-48380-3. OCLC 1107853827.
- Skidmore, Emily (2017). True Sex. New York University Press. ISBN 978-1-4798-7063-9.
