= Liberty's Prisoners =

2015 book by Jen Manion

Liberty's Prisoners: Carceral Culture in Early America
- Author: Jen Manion
- Genre: History
- Published: 2015
- Publisher: University of Pennsylvania Press
- ISBN: 9780812247572
- Website: jenmanion.com

Liberty's Prisoners: Carceral Culture in Early America is a history book by Jen Manion, a professor of History and Sexuality, Women's and Gender Studies at Amherst College, published in 2015 by the University of Pennsylvania Press. The book was awarded the 2016 Mary Kelley Book Prize by the Society for Historians of the Early American Republic.

== Synopsis ==
Manion reviews historical material from Pennsylvania between 1792 and 1835, including court and prison records as well as other historical material, to examine changes in the penal system during this era and disparities based on race, gender, poverty, and sexuality. According to a review by Jennifer Graber for The American Historical Review, Manion "draws on foundational work by Michel Foucault, David Rothman, and Michael Meranze, as well as more recent studies focused on women's and African Americans' experiences of prison."

== Reception ==
Sharon Block describes Manion as a "dexterous scholar" in a review for the Journal of Women's History, noting the "theoretically-influenced empirical approach to tracing the development of the carceral state in post-Revolutionary Pennsylvania" as well as the footnotes and appendix tables that "make clear this commitment to evidentiary documentation of lives too often erased." In a review for The American Historical Review, Jennifer Graber writes, "One of the book's strengths is its engagement with other critical historiographies about the period, including works on gender, race, violence, poverty, sex and sexuality, humanitarianism and sensibility, and labor and economy."

In a review for Early American Literature, Richard Bell describes the book as "a welcome complement to Rothman and Meranze," further stating the book "easily surpasses those earlier studies in its attention to the ways that the women and men confined at the center of Philadelphia's new carceral institutions attempted to contest, compromise, and transform the violent and divisive penal policies", and praises the use of prison and court records "to draw sustained attention to an urban underclass of hucksters, arsonists, sex workers, and beggars too poor or too transient to show up in surviving tax lists, censuses, or church records." In a review for The William and Mary Quarterly, Michael Meranze writes that the book "powerfully recaptures the moment of transition between an older penal system based on public pain and shame and an emergent one centered on confinement, surveillance, and hidden humiliation", and states Manion "implicitly criticizes my work for inadequately engaging with both the question of sexuality and the perspectives of Walnut Street's early inmates." Meranze also states further discussion of the criticism, and how it might affect his or others' work, would have made the book "a more powerful intervention."

Adam Jay Hirsch writes in a review for The Historian, "even if this book is not definitive, its pioneering stabs at neglected aspects of the sociology of incarceration make Liberty's Prisoners worth looking at." In a review for The Journal of American History, Gwenda Morgan writes, "By focusing on the punishment meted out to selected groups - immigrants, African Americans, and the poor - Manion moves discussions of change away from an earlier emphasis on felony and the death penalty to misdemeanors such as vagrancy and petty theft. The focus on small-scale offenders is new, and the extraordinary punishments to which they were subjected cries out for explanation." Ashley Rubin writes in a review for Journal of the Early Republic, "In a way, Liberty's Prisoners is less about punishment than gender, class, and race; prisons are irrelevant to the narrative - they could be any instrument of power." Ittai Orr writes in a review for American Quarterly, "Manion is careful to highlight the intersectionality of many of these prisoners: interracial sex was even more queer than sodomy, and although the Irish endured as much discrimination, poverty, and imprisonment as black people, their punishments were never as harsh - especially as the nineteenth century wore on - as those of black women." Orr describes the focus by Manion on gender, sexuality, and race as distinguishing the book and making the book "an important addition to the field."

In Reviews in American History, Jeannine Marie DeLombard writes, "Too often Manion's rich archival evidence leads to critical conclusions that have already been elaborated by non-historian scholars of early American penality," while also noting the book "provides the historical long view that is too often missing from the ongoing controversy over race and penality in America." Paul Kahan writes in a review for The Pennsylvania Magazine of History and Biography, "That the story Manion tells has been ably told before in no way diminishes Liberty's Prisoners; it is an important, if not essential, work on the history of American penitentiaries." In a review for the Register of the Kentucky Historical Society, Charlene J. Fletcher-Brown writes, "Manion's analysis of court and prison records is perhaps the work's greatest strength. These sources not only provide insight into prison management and policymaking, but also ways in which inmates resisted within incarcerated spaces and, more important, demonstrates the humanity of incarcerated people."
