= John H. Dunning Prize =

Book prize for American history

The John H. Dunning Prize is a biennial book prize awarded by the American Historical Association for the best book in history related to the United States. The prize was established in 1929, and is regarded as one of the most prestigious national honors in American historical writing. Currently, only the author's first or second book is eligible. Laureates include Oscar Handlin, John Higham, Laurel Thatcher Ulrich and Gordon Wood. The Dunning Prize has been shared five times, most recently in 1993. No award was made in 1937.

== List of prize winners ==
- 2025 -- Gloria McCahon Whiting, Belonging: An Intimate History of Slavery and Family in Early New England
- 2023 -- Kathryn Olivarius, Necropolis: Disease, Power, and Capitalism in the Cotton Kingdom
- 2021 -- Bathsheba Demuth, Floating Coast: An Environmental History of the Bering Strait
- 2019 -- Christina N. Snyder, Great Crossings: Indians, Settlers, and Slaves in the Age of Jackson
- 2017 -- Matthew Karp, This Vast Southern Empire: Slaveholders at the Helm of American Foreign Policy
- 2015 -- Kate Brown, Plutopia: Nuclear Families, Atomic Cities, and the Great Soviet and American Plutonium Disasters
- 2013 -- Jennifer Ratner-Rosenhagen, American Nietzsche: A History of an Icon and His Ideas
- 2011—Darren T. Dochuk, From Bible Belt to Sunbelt: Plain-Folk Religion, Grassroots Politics, and the Rise of Evangelical Conservatism
- 2009 -- Peggy Pascoe, What Comes Naturally: Miscegenation Law and the Making of Race in America
- 2007—Linda L. Nash, Inescapable Ecologies: A History of Environment, Disease, and Knowledge
- 2005—Jon T. Coleman, Vicious: Wolves and Men in America
- 2003—Michael Willrich, City of Courts: Socializing Justice in Progressive Era Chicago
- 2001—Ernest Freeberg, The Education of Laura Bridgman: First Deaf and Blind Person to Learn Language
- 1999—Marilyn C. Baseler, Asylum for Mankind: America, 1607-1800
- 1997—Kathleen M. Brown, Good Wives, Nasty Wenches, and Anxious Patriarchs: Gender, Race, and Power in Colonial Virginia
- 1995—Daniel Vickers, Farmers and Fishermen: Two Centuries of Work in Essex County, Massachusetts, 1630–1850
- 1993—A. Gregg Roeber, Palatines, Liberty, and Property: German Lutherans in Colonial British America
- 1993—Daniel H. Usner, Indians, Settlers, and Slaves in a Frontier Exchange Economy: The Lower Mississippi Before 1783
- 1991—Eric Arnesen, Waterfront Worker of New Orleans: Race, Class, and Politics, 1863-1923
- 1990 -- Laurel Thatcher Ulrich, A Midwife’s Tale: The Life of Martha Ballard, Based on Her Diary, 1785-1812
- 1989 -- Drew R. McCoy, The Last of the Fathers: James Madison and the Republican Legacy
- 1988—Joseph E. Stevens, Hoover Dam: An American Adventure
- 1987—Allan Kulikoff, Tobacco and Slaves: The Development of Southern Cultures in the Chesapeake, 1680-1800
- 1986 -- Barbara J. Fields, Slavery and Freedom on the Middle Ground: Maryland during the 19th Century
- 1984 -- Nick Salvatore, Eugene V. Debs: Citizen and Socialist
- 1982—David J. Jeremy, Transatlantic Industrial Revolution: The Diffusion of Textile Technologies between Britain and America
- 1980—John D. Unruh Jr., The Plains Across: The Overland Emigrants and the TransMississippi West, 1840-60
- 1978—J. Mills Thornton, Politics and Power in a Slave Society: Alabama, 1800-1861
- 1976 -- Thomas S. Hines, Burnham of Chicago: Architect and Planner
- 1974 -- Paul S. Boyer, Salem Possessed: The Social Origins of Witchcraft
- 1974—Stephen Nissenbaum, Salem Possessed: The Social Origins of Witchcraft
- 1972 -- John Patrick Diggins, Mussolini and Fascism: The View from America
- 1970 -- Gordon S. Wood, The Creation of the American Republic, 1776-1787
- 1968—Robert L. Beisner, Twelve Against Empire: The Anti-Imperialists, 1898-1900
- 1966—John W. Shy, Toward Lexington: The Role of the British Army in the American Revolution
- 1964—John H. Cox, Politics, Principle, and Prejudice, 1865-66)
- 1964 -- LaWanda Cox, Politics, Principle, and Prejudice, 1865-66
- 1962—E. James Ferguson, The Power of the Purse: A History of American Public Finance, 1776-90
- 1960 -- Eric McKitrick, Andrew Johnson and Reconstruction
- 1958—Marvin Bud Meyers, The Jacksonian Persuasion
- 1956 -- John Higham, Strangers in the Land: Patterns of American Nativism
- 1954—Gerald H. Carson, The Old Country Store
- 1952 -- Louis C. Hunter, Steamboats on the Western Rivers: An Economic and Technological History
- 1952—Beatrice Jones Hunter, Steamboats on the Western Rivers: An Economic and Technological History
- 1950 -- Henry Nash Smith, Virgin Land: The American West as Symbol and Myth
- 1948—William E. Livezey, Mahan on Sea Power
- 1946—David M. Ellis, Landlords and Farmers in the Hudson Mohawk Region
- 1944—Elting E. Morison, Admiral Sims and the Modern American Navy
- 1942 -- Oscar Handlin, Boston's Immigrants
- 1940 -- Richard W. Leopold, Robert Dale Owen
- 1938—Robert A. East, Business Enterprise in the American Revolutionary Era
- 1935 -- Angie Debo, The Rise and Fall of the Choctaw Republic
- 1933—Amos A. Ettinger, The Mission to Spain of Pierre Soule
- 1931 -- Francis Butler Simkins, South Carolina During Reconstruction
- 1931—R. H. Woody, South Carolina During Reconstruction
- 1929—Haywood J. Pearce Jr., Benjamin H. Hill: Secession and Reconstruction

== See also ==
- List of history awards
