= Lawrence W. Levine =

American historian

- Born: Lawrence William Levine; February 27, 1933; Manhattan, New York City, New York, US
- Died: October 23, 2006 (aged 73); Berkeley, California, US
- Spouse: Cornelia Roettcher Levine (m. 1964)
- Awards: MacArthur Fellowship (1983)

Academic background
- Education: City College of New York; Columbia University
- Doctoral advisor: Richard Hofstadter

Academic work
- Discipline: History
- Sub-discipline: American history; social history
- Institutions: University of California, Berkeley; George Mason University

Lawrence William Levine (February 27, 1933 – October 23, 2006) was an American historian. He was born in Manhattan and died in Berkeley, California. He was noted for promoting multiculturalism and the perspectives of ordinary people in the study of history.

== Life ==
He graduated from the City College of New York in 1955, and from Columbia University, with a master's degree and a doctorate in 1962, where he studied under Richard Hofstadter. He taught at Princeton University from 1962 to 1963, and then at the University of California, Berkeley, from 1963 to 1994. After retiring from Berkeley, he taught at George Mason University from 1994 to 2005.

He participated in civil rights sit-ins at Berkeley and in the South, and the Free Speech Movement.

He married Cornelia Roettcher Levine in 1964, with whom he wrote The People and the President: America's Conversation with FDR; they had two sons, Joshua Levine and Isaac Levine, and a stepson, Alexander Pimentel.

== Awards and honors ==
Levine was a MacArthur Fellow in 1983, elected to the American Academy of Arts and Sciences in 1985 and a Fulbright Scholar in History from the University of California - Berkeley to the University of Sydney in 1988. He was president of the Organization of American Historians in 1992–93 and received a Guggenheim Fellowship in 1994. An award in his name is given by the Organization of American Historians.

== Works ==
- Levine, Lawrence W. (1965). Defender of the Faith: William Jennings Bryan, the Last Decade, 1915-1925. Oxford University Press. ISBN 978-0-674-19542-4. (reprint Harvard University Press, 1987, ISBN 978-0-674-19542-4)
- Levine, Lawrence W. (1978). Black Culture and Black Consciousness: Afro-American Folk Thought from Slavery to Freedom. Oxford University Press. ISBN 978-0-19-502374-9. "Lawrence W Levine."
- Levine, Lawrence W. (1990). Highbrow/Lowbrow: The Emergence of Cultural Hierarchy in America. Harvard University Press. ISBN 978-0-674-39077-5.
- Levine, Lawrence W. (1993). The Unpredictable Past: Explorations in American Cultural History. Oxford University Press. ISBN 978-0-19-508297-5.
- Levine, Lawrence W. (1997). The Opening of the American Mind: Canons, Culture and History. Beacon Press. ISBN 978-0-8070-3119-3. "Lawrence W Levine."
- Lawrence W. Levine; Cornelia R. Levine (2002). The People and the President: America's Conversation with FDR. Beacon Press. ISBN 978-0-8070-5510-6.

Professional and academic associations
Preceded by Joyce Appleby	President of the Organization of American Historians; 1992–1993	Succeeded by Eric Foner
