= Daniel R. Mandell =

American historian (born 1956)

- Born: 1956 (age 69–70)
- Education: Humboldt State University (BA); Tufts University (MA); University of Virginia (PhD)
- Occupation: Historian
- Awards: Lawrence W. Levine Award (2008)
- Website: dmandell.sites.truman.edu

Daniel R. Mandell (born 1956) is an American historian.

He taught at Truman State University 1999-2022; that followed years of wandering in the academic wilderness after completing his History Ph.D. at the University of Virginia in January 1992. He also earned an M.A. in Urban and Environmental Policy at Tufts University and B.A. in History at Humboldt State University. He has received research fellowships from the National Endowment for the Humanities, the Massachusetts Historical Society, the Library Company of Philadelphia, and the American Antiquarian Society. In 2018-2019, Prof. Mandell was Distinguished Research Fellow at the Kinder Institute on Constitutional Democracy at the University of Missouri, beginning a study of the conundrum between individual and collective rights in the U.S. highlighted by the evolution of Native American policies and laws.

He received the Lawrence W. Levine Award in 2008 for his book Tribe, Race, History: Native Americans in Southern New England, 1780–1880. In 2016, Mandell received the Distinguished Literary Achievement award from the Missouri Humanities Council in recognition of his many publications on Native Americans in New England between 1600 and 1900. His most recent book The Lost Tradition of Economic Equality in America, 1600-1870 was given the 2021 “Best Book Award” by the Missouri Conference on History.

== Bibliography ==
Some of his books are:

- King Philip's War: Colonial Expansion, Native Resistance, and the End of Indian Sovereignty
- Behind the Frontier: Indians in Eighteenth-Century Eastern Massachusetts
- Tribe, Race, History: Native Americans in Southern New England, 1780–1880
- The Lost Tradition of Economic Equality in America, 1600-1870
