= Allyson Hobbs =

American historian

- Occupations: Historian, Author, Professor
- Awards: Frederick Jackson Turner Award (2015), Dean’s Award for Distinguished Teaching (2017)

Academic background
- Education: Harvard University; University of Chicago
- Alma mater: Harvard University

Academic work
- Institutions: Stanford University
- Notable works: A Chosen Exile: A History of Racial Passing in American Life

Allyson Hobbs is an American historian, author, and associate professor at Stanford University. Hobbs is known for her scholarly work on African American history, especially her research on racial passing. Hobbs is also a prominent public intellectual, regularly engaging in contemporary discussions of race, inequality, and violence in America by drawing on historical contexts. Her academic and public scholarship often intersects themes of identity, justice, and cultural memory.

== Early life and education ==
Hobbs graduated from Harvard University in 1997, where she majored in social studies. She credits her undergraduate experiences, including courses on African American culture and the civil rights movement, as pivotal in shaping her future research interests. She completed her PhD in history at the University of Chicago in 2009 where her dissertation explored the concept of racial passing in American history, an interest that would form the basis for her future scholarly work. She interned at Goldman Sachs before deciding to work towards being a historian.

Hobbs was elected by her classmates as Harvard's 2022 chief marshal of alumni, which involved her playing a number of ceremonial roles in celebration to her undergraduate class's ('97) 25th reunion.

== Academic career ==
Hobbs is currently an associate professor in the Department of History at Stanford University. Her teaching and research center on U.S. history, African American history, and the historical construction of race, with a focus on how race intersects with gender and identity. Hobbs also serves as the director of African and African American studies at Stanford.

Her first book, A Chosen Exile: A History of Racial Passing in American Life, examines how African Americans in U.S. history made the fraught decision to "pass" as white to escape racial discrimination. The book explores the social and emotional costs of passing, including the loss of community, family, and self-identity. Hobbs's work has been praised for its narrative depth, combining rigorous historical analysis with personal stories to highlight the human dimensions of racial passing. The book won the Frederick Jackson Turner Award from the Organization of American Historians in 2015.

She served on the jury that awarded the 2018 Pulitzer Prize in History.

== Scholarship ==
Hobbs is a frequent contributor to public discourse on race, inequality, and violence, publishing essays in outlets such as The New Yorker, The Atlantic, and The New York Times. She often writes about how historical events inform contemporary issues, particularly regarding the racial dynamics that have shaped American society.

In 2020, Hobbs published an essay titled "Violence in the Gilded Ages, Then and Now" in The Journal of the Gilded Age and Progressive Era, where she draws powerful connections between the violence and racial terror of the Gilded Age and contemporary racialized violence, particularly police brutality. In this essay, Hobbs explores the 1873 Colfax Massacre, where white supremacist groups attacked African Americans defending a courthouse in Louisiana, resulting in the deaths of up to 165 Black men. The massacre, Hobbs argues, illustrates how violence was used to dismantle Reconstruction-era advances and how racial terror was normalized as a political tool. Hobbs then draws explicit parallels to modern-day violence against Black Americans, particularly police brutality. She argues that just as the Colfax Massacre symbolized white supremacy’s dominance during Reconstruction, contemporary instances of police brutality against unarmed Black individuals serve as reminders of the enduring legacy of racial violence in the U.S. Through historical comparison, Hobbs contends that state-sanctioned violence has always played a role in maintaining racial hierarchies, and that today's killings of Black individuals by police continue this tragic pattern. She connects these historical and modern instances of violence to broader issues of racial inequality, voter suppression, and systemic injustice, arguing that understanding this history is crucial to addressing the deep-rooted racial issues facing America today.

In a 2020 interview with the Morristown Colonial, Hobbs states that understanding the history of racial violence, like the Colfax Massacre, allows society to see how present-day injustices are not new phenomena but rather the continuation of long-standing patterns in American society.

== Media appearances ==
Hobbs regularly appears on public radio and television to discuss historical and contemporary issues of race and justice. She has been featured on NPR, PBS, MSNBC, and The Oprah Winfrey Show, where she has spoken about the significance of her work on racial passing and its relevance to today's discussions on race and identity.

== Awards and honors ==
- Frederick Jackson Turner Award, Organization of American Historians (2015)
- Lawrence Levine Award for Best Book in American Cultural History (2015)
- Dean’s Award for Distinguished Teaching, Stanford University (2017)
- Freedom Fighter Award, San Francisco NAACP (2017)
- American Council of Learned Societies Fellowship (2019)

== Selected publications ==
- A Chosen Exile: A History of Racial Passing in American Life. Harvard University Press, 2014. ISBN 978-0674368101.
- Hobbs, Allyson. "Violence in the Gilded Ages, Then and Now." The Journal of the Gilded Age and Progressive Era, vol. 19, no. 2, 2020, pp. 264–270. DOI.
- "Race and the Right to Vote in the United States." The New Yorker, June 2018.
