= Peggy Pascoe =

American historian (1954–2010)

Peggy Ann Pascoe (October 18, 1954 – July 23, 2010) was an American historian. She was the Beekman Professor of Northwest and Pacific History and Professor of Ethnic Studies at the University of Oregon. She was a member of the University of Oregon History Department from 1996 until her death on July 23, 2010. Prior to her work at UO, Pascoe worked as an assistant professor and then associate professor at the University of Utah, where she taught courses on women’s history, race, and sexuality. Pascoe’s work centers on the history of race, gender, and sexuality, with a particular investment in law and the U.S. West. Together with George Lipsitz, Earl Lewis, George Sanchez, and Dana Takagi, Pascoe edited the influential American Crossroads book series in Ethnic Studies, published by the University of California Press. Pascoe held this position for fifteen years.

== Background ==
Pascoe was born in Butte, Montana, a former mining town that attracted a mix of European, Mexican, and Chinese immigrants in the late nineteenth century, and that contained one of the largest Chinatowns in the West The experience of growing up in Butte sparked a lifelong interest in the multiracial history of the U.S. West for Pascoe. She graduated with a B.A. in History from Montana State University in 1977, an M.A. in Women’s History from Sarah Lawrence College in 1980, and capped her graduate career with a Ph.D. in American History from Stanford University in 1986. Pascoe and her partner of thirty years shared two daughters.

== What Comes Naturally (2010) ==
Pascoe's second book, What Comes Naturally: Miscegenation Law and the Making of Race in America was published in 2009, several months before Pascoe succumbed to ovarian cancer in July 2010. Pascoe's interest in interracial marriage began as early as 1991, when she wrote a Jensen Prize award-winning article entitled “Race, Gender, and Intercultural Relations: The Case of Interracial Marriage”; another piece, “Miscegenation Law, Court Cases and Ideologies of ‘Race’ in 20th-Century America” won the America: History and Life Prize in 1997. What Comes Naturally thus represents the culmination of nearly two decades' worth of research on miscegenation law in the United States.

While Pascoe's earlier doctoral work and first book, Relations of Rescue: The Search for Female Moral Authority in the American West, 1874–1939, found a geographical focus in the western United States, What Comes Naturally offers a consideration of how interracial marriages were variously policed by different states and geographical regions at different times in American history. Spanning the long century between the 1860s – when the word “miscegenation,” from miscere (to mix) and genus (species), came into popular usage – and the watershed Loving v. Virginia case in 1967, Pascoe draws together legal theory, court testimony, oral history, and media archives to show the long and complicated history of miscegenation law in the U.S., and to give a sense of the vast range of people whose lives were affected by these oppressive legislative acts.

The book consists of nine chapters and is divided into four parts: 1) Miscegenation Law and Constitutional Equality, 1863-1900, 2) Miscegenation Law and Race Classification, 1860-1948, 3) Miscegenation Law and Its Opponents, 1913-1967, and 4) The Politics of Colorblindness, 1967-2000. Part one examines the ways in which early American modes of citizenship were tied to gender and sexuality, and shows how the scandal of “illicit sex” between races became a hot-button issue in the Civil War and reconstruction periods, following the abolition of slavery. Part two looks at how the government surveilled, managed, and restricted such “illicit” relationships through legislation that criminalized marriage between people of different racial or ethnic backgrounds, while the third section of the book explores how resistance movements of the 1960s opposed these discriminatory acts, culminating in the Loving v. Virginia trial. The section of the book mounts a critique of the colorblind logic that has tended to dominate contemporary liberal discourse on race and interracial intimacy since Loving, despite the persistence of racism in American culture at large.

What Comes Naturally was widely acclaimed and won numerous awards for its contribution to American historical and cultural studies. These included: the Ellis W. Hawley Prize and the Lawrence W. Levine Award from the Organization of American Historians the John H. Dunning Prize and the Joan Kelly Memorial Prize from the American Historical Association; and the J. Willard Hurst Prize from the Law and Society Association.

== Investment in critical race theory ==
Peggy Pascoe’s treatment of race in What Comes Naturally uses the insights of critical race theory to establish her argument about miscegenation laws’ power to fashion and reproduce racial categories.

Following the civil rights movement, many activists believed that little change had come. Even with the Civil Rights Act of 1964 and Voting Rights Act of 1965, legal scholars like Derrick Bell argued that inequality, including discrimination in the legal system, persisted. In response, Bell and other legal scholars looked again at the realities of racism in the courts and developed the critical race theory (CRT). They argued that the legislative remedies did not fix the problem. According to the CRT, the assumptions of the legal system—not just positive laws asserting segregationist policy—are racist, and the legal system not only enacted racism but also reproduced and reinforced racial categories and discrimination. The CRT scholars claimed that the legal system functioned under and resulted in structural racism. Along with their race-generative paradigm, CRT scholars crafted a critique of liberalism to assess the problems of the so-called gains of the civil rights movement like affirmative action and color-blindness.

Pascoe’s What Comes Naturally is an outgrowth of that intellectual formula. In her text, she notes that miscegenation law scholarship began interpreting the laws as attacks on citizens’ civil rights. The scholars claimed that it created a racial caste and was a “tragic denial of the rights of personal choice.” Pascoe, however, distances herself from this scholarship, and places her work in the lineage of CRT and critical cultural studies scholars, including Bell and author of “Whiteness as Property,” Cheryl I. Harris.

Employing the CRT paradigm, Pascoe recast miscegenation law to argue that it was not simply an affront to individuals’ right to marry who they wanted. From 1880 to 1930, miscegenation law also functioned as “the foundation of the larger racial projects of white supremacy and white purity” and (re)created race. The laws delineated race and judges, lawyers, and all participants in the legal system, including the police, defendants, and plaintiffs, acted according to those definitions of race simply by partaking in the legal process and thus strengthened those definitions in the law. Furthermore, the legislators and legal practitioners reflexive reference to racial categories in the laws, opinions, and court battles naturalized whiteness, blackness, and other constructions demarcated as races. As Pascoe writes, “In practice, miscegenation law acted as a kind of legal factory for defining, producing, and reproducing of the racial categories of the state.”

== Other works ==
In addition to teaching and mentoring, Pascoe was involved in a number of professional and community organizations, and was a frequently invited commentator for newspapers and radio sources. After she died the Journal of Women's History published an issue that honored Pascoe for her mentorship of women graduate students. Pascoe also authored numerous essays on the historical linkages between interracial marriage and same sex marriage, and she professed to be "uncomfortable making direct comparisons between the present and the past." Pascoe posited that the work of civil rights activists in paving the way for gay and lesbian activists cannot be underestimated, and that the same “ugly rhetoric”—the natural vs. unnatural paradigm—structures opposition to both same sex marriage and interracial marriage. Pascoe also warned against the myth of colorblindness in the aftermath of Barack Obama’s election, as the “wily tenacity of racism” continues to shape discourse on Obama’s black father and white mother. In 2009, Pascoe received a Martin Luther King Jr. award from the University of Oregon for her work in promoting diversity and social equality on campus.
