= Stephen Nissenbaum =

American scholar

Stephen Nissenbaum (A.B. Harvard College, 1961; M.A. Columbia University, 1963; Ph.D., University of Wisconsin–Madison, 1968), is an American scholar, a Professor Emeritus of the University of Massachusetts at Amherst's History Department specializing in early American history through to the nineteenth century. Most notably, he co-authored a book with Paul Boyer in 1974 about the Salem witch trials, Salem Possessed: The Social Origins of Witchcraft, called "a landmark in early American studies" by John Putnam Demos.

== Professional career ==
After receiving his doctorate in history from the University of Wisconsin–Madison in 1968, Nissenbaum began his academic career at the University of Massachusetts at Amherst, where he was on the faculty until he retired in 2004.

He was a fellow twice at Harvard's Charles Warren Center for Studies in American History. The first time, in 1976–1977, was to work on two projects, one about the career of Nathaniel Hawthorne and the other to write the introduction to the Salem Witchcraft Papers with Paul Boyer. He returned in 1994–1995 to work on his book, The Battle for Christmas.

At the American Antiquarian Society, he was a Daniels Fellow in 1978–1979, supervising innovative research projects by Five College undergraduate students, one of which culminated in an exhibition of book illustrations by F. O. C. Darley at the AAS. He also designed and conducted a 5-week evening course for adults, "Victorian America," through the Worcester Public School system.

He received a fellowship in 1984 from the American Council of Learned Societies to work on the subject of "Nathaniel Hawthorne and the literary marketplace".

He served on the board of the Massachusetts Foundation for the Humanities, a fund for underwriting public projects in the humanities, from 1985 to 1992, and was the Chairman of the Foundation from 1987 to 1989.

From 1989 to 1990, he was the James Pinckney Harrison Professor of History at the College of William and Mary.

In 1991–1992, he was granted an American Antiquarian Society-National Endowment for the Humanities Long-Term Fellowship to pursue research on the history of Christmas in New England in relation to popular culture and the printed word.

He was a Visiting Fulbright Professor at the Humboldt University of Berlin from 1998 to 1999. In this capacity, he gave a lecture, "Sexual Prudery and Radicalism in the Nineteenth-Century America," on March 31, 1999, for the American Literature Department at Adam Mickiewicz University in Poznan, Poland, and the W. E. B. Du Bois Lecture, "The 'Christmas Riots' of 1865. Black Hopes and White Fears on the Eve of Reconstruction," at Humboldt on April 27, 1999.

He was granted a fellowship from the National Endowment for the Humanities in 1999, in support of his research into myth-making of old New England.

After retiring from the University of Massachusetts at Amherst in 2004, Nissenbaum taught HST295, a special topic seminar, "American Holidays", as an adjunct at the University of Vermont in the Fall of 2007.

== Scholarship with Paul Boyer on Salem Witch Trials ==
In the fall of 1969, Nissenbaum and fellow University of Massachusetts at Amherst Professor Paul Boyer offered the course History 185, "New Approaches to the Study of History," an "experimental history course" inspired by pedagogical work of historians Stanley Katz and William R. Taylor, with whom Nissenbaum had worked during his doctoral studies at the University of Wisconsin–Madison. In the course, undergraduates undertook "actual historical research" on a single historical episode, using almost exclusively primary source materials. Senior colleagues in the department were skeptical about the approach. Two subjects were chosen the first semester the course was offered, the Salem witch trials and Shays' Rebellion, but the entire course came to be devoted exclusively to the Salem material. Students were encouraged to take research trips to see original records at the Essex County Courthouse in Salem, Massachusetts.

As they and their students continued to amass primary sources on the subject for the course, Boyer and Nissenbaum published Salem-Village Witchcraft: A Documentary Record of Local Conflict in Colonial New England in 1972, a collection of transcriptions from a variety of previously unpublished and rarely consulted primary source materials from the later seventeenth century concerning the community of Salem Village, Massachusetts, in the period of the Salem witch trials, including the Salem Village Book of Record and the manuscript book of the sermons of the village minister, Samuel Parris.

Boyer and Nissenbaum collaborated on the book Salem Possessed: The Social Origins of Witchcraft', which was published in 1974, in which they outlined the social and economic context of the event, describing pre-existing village factions that had a direct correlation with the accusations of witchcraft in the village. The book was received well, lauded as a "first-rate discussion of factionalism in a seventeenth-century New England town" by T. H. Breen, but with reservations about whether the two had established a direct relationship between economic factors and the witchcraft accusations, and asking whether that was even possible. Reviewing the book in 1978, Carol Karlsen called the book "an important, imaginative book that brings new insights to study of the 1692 witchcraft outbreak in Massachusetts.", repeating her praise in 2008 when she wrote that the book "profoundly shap[ed] the way other historians, students, and general readers have understood the causes of the 1692 witch trials."

During the writing of the book, the two collaboratively worked on creating a map of Salem Village and had what they described as "a eureka moment" when they saw a geographic pattern emerge, between where the accusers and the accused lived in town. Over the years, the two scholars had been frustrated "when that simplified summary of the Geography of Witchcraft map has been used to represent the entire argument of Salem Possessed."

Following the publication of Salem Possessed, the two historians decided to compile and publish transcriptions of even more primary source documents that had proven to be so valuable to them and to their students. Published in 1978 in three volumes, The Salem Witchcraft Papers: Verbatim Transcripts of the Legal Documents of the Salem Witchcraft Outbreak of 1692 included transcriptions of the legal papers that had been done by a WPA team headed by Archie N. Frost in 1938, which had only been available to scholars in typescript form on deposit with the Essex Institute and with the Essex County Clerk of the Courts. In addition to these documents from the collections of the Essex County Court and the Massachusetts Archives, Boyer and Nissenbaum added transcriptions of some additional documents held by the Boston Public Library and the Massachusetts Historical Society, which had not been transcribed by the WPA. The collection was lauded upon publication as the "most valuable product of Boyer's and Nissenbaum's collaborative research in this important episode of New England history," and "a unique teaching and research tool for historians."

== Selected publications ==
- The Battle for Christmas: A Cultural History of America's Most Cherished Holiday (New York: Knopf, 1996)
- A History of the Book in America, Vol. 3: The Industrial Book, 1840-1880. Co-editor with Scott Casper, Jeffrey D. Groves, Michael Winship. (Chapel Hill: University of North Carolina Press, 2007)
- Salem Possessed: The Social Origins of Witchcraft, co-author with Paul Boyer. (Cambridge: Harvard University Press, 1974).
  - nominated, National Book Award
  - winner, American Historical Association's John H. Dunning Prize, 1974
- Salem-Village Witchcraft: A Documentary Record of Local Conflict in Colonial New England, co-editor with Paul Boyer (Boston: Northeastern University Press, 1972)
- The Salem Witchcraft Papers, co-editor with Paul Boyer (3 vols., NY: DaCapo Press, 1977)
- Sex, Diet, and Debility in Jacksonian America: Sylvester Graham and Health Reform (New York, Praeger, 1980)
  - finalist, Pulitzer Prize
