= Highbrow/Lowbrow =

1990 Nonfiction book by Lawrence Levine

Highbrow/Lowbrow: The Emergence of Cultural Hierarchy in America
- 1988 Book jacket
- Author: Lawrence W. Levine
- Subject: American popular Culture, Art, History, Social science
- Genre: Nonfiction
- Set in: 19th century United States
- Published: 1988
- Publisher: Harvard University Press
- Publication place: United States
- Media type: Print, E-Book
- Pages: 320
- ISBN: 9780674390768 9780674390775
- OCLC: 17804284
- LC Class: E169.I.L536
- Website: Official website

Highbrow/Lowbrow: The Emergence of Cultural Hierarchy in America is a nonfiction book by Lawrence W. Levine. It was originally published by Harvard University Press in 1988.

== Synopsis ==
Levine's argument is that during the first half of the 19th century, American culture was shared among the social classes. There was no rigid distinction between so called high art and low brow art. Attendance of Shakespearean plays and operatic performances ranged across the social classes. Levine shows that Shakespeare during this period was popular entertainment. He was performed alongside magicians or comic singers, before being reclassified as elite literature. Levine introduces the concept of sacralization for when certain art forms were removed from the general public sphere and given a special, higher status. This process transformed art from a shared social occasion into one of contemplative aesthetic appreciation.

Similar to theater, opera was performed in English with simplified plots for broad audiences. By the late 19th century, it became an exclusive activity that demonstrated high status, performed in original languages and restricted to specific social tiers. There was a likewise change in audience behavior. In the early 1800s, audiences were boisterous and they participated. By the end of the century, decorum dictated silence and applause and only at specific times. This was enforced by the social elite to distance themselves from the perceived lower social classes.

George Lipsitz, writing for American Quarterly says that:

Levine leaves no doubt about the social origins and implications of these cultural choices. He points out that the very terms "highbrow" and "lowbrow" reflect the influence of phrenology, the racist pseudoscience of the nineteenth century that "determined" racial identity and intelligence by measuring cranial shapes. In the universe of phrenology, the superiority of Europeans could be seen in their "high" brows that differentiated them from inferior species...

=== Critique ===
Joan Shelley Rubin, in her 2014 article, "Rethinking the Creation of Cultural Hierarchy in America" reassesses Levine's theory. She says that Levine's view is too simple and ignores the general public's agency pertaining to this issue. People weren't just passive followers of elite rules. They interpreted art and literature in their own ways. Rubin then discusses the importance of people and groups in the middle, such as book clubs, critics, and editors. These "mediators" helped bridge the gap between elite art and the public, creating a "middlebrow" culture that doesn't fit neatly into "high" or "low" categories. She notes that new inventions since the 19th century such as the radio and phonograph, altered the way culture was experienced. These technologies often blurred the lines of cultural hierarchy.

== About the book ==
The book is 320 pages and organized as follows:

Prologue

1. William Shakespeare in America
2. The Sacralization of Culture
3. Order, Hierarchy, and Culture Epilogue

Notes
Index

== Reception ==
Mark Fonder, reviewing for Bulletin of the Council for Research in Music Education says Levine’s historical documentation is meticulous and persuasive. The book challenges educators to reconsider the rigid boundaries between "art music" and "popular music" that still persist in academic settings. Joan Shelley Rubin, writing for the journal Reception: Texts, Readers, Audiences, History, says that "...we must bear in mind that that multiple motivations and responses coexist in individuals and collectivities and thus resist generalizations about popular, middle-class, or high culture that fail to acknowledge eclectic tastes and variation within audiences. That agenda may give us enough to do for the next twenty-five years."

George Lipsitz, writing for American Quarterly says "At stake is a very important question, whether the cultural and social problems of our society can be addressed adequately by pluralist reforms or whether they require a fundamental restructuring of cultural categories as the postmodernist...certainly no voice would be more welcome in a discussion of it than that of Lawrence Levine..." According to Alicia Kae Roger doing this review for Theatre Journal, Levine’s research into shifting artistic perspectives indicates that cultural significance is not exclusive to any specific group, genre, or era. His work prompts modern scholars and artists to reconsider how American culture is defined and structured in the present day.
