= Paul Boyer (historian) =

American cultural & intellectual historian (1935-2012)

Paul Samuel Boyer (August 2, 1935–March 17, 2012) was a U.S. cultural and intellectual historian (Ph.D., Harvard University, 1966) and Merle Curti Professor of History Emeritus and former director (1993–2001) of the Institute for Research in the Humanities at the University of Wisconsin–Madison. He had held visiting professorships at UCLA, Northwestern University, and William & Mary; had received Guggenheim Foundation and Rockefeller Foundation Fellowships; and was an elected member of the American Academy of Arts and Sciences, the Society of American Historians, and the American Antiquarian Society.

== Biography ==
Boyer was born in 1935 in Dayton, Ohio, to Clarence and Ethel Boyer; he had two older brothers, Ernest L. Boyer and William Boyer. The family was active in the Brethren in Christ Church, an offshoot of the Mennonites. In 1962 he married Ann Talbot, of Baltimore, Md. He earned his Doctorate in American History from Harvard University. Before being invited to the University of Wisconsin in 1980, he taught at the University of Massachusetts-Amherst from 1967 to 1980. After his retirement, he became an editor at U.W. Press and a co-author of several college textbooks. Paul Samuel Boyer died at Agrace Hospicecare on March 17, 2012, after three months battle with cancer.

== Historiography ==
Boyer, who grew up in a conservative Christian family, was a pacifist and conscientious objector. He specialized in the religious and moral history of the American people from the days of the Salem Witch Trials in the 1690s, through the Protestant efforts to reform society in the 19th and early 20th centuries to the impact of nuclear weapons on the American psyche after World War II.

== Selected publications ==
- Purity in Print: Book Censorship in America from the Gilded Age to the Computer Age (NY: Charles Scribner's Sons, 1968; 2nd edition with two new chapters, Madison: University of Wisconsin Press, 2002)
- Notable American Women, 1607–1950 (Cambridge: Harvard University Press, 3 vols., 1971). Assistant editor.
- Salem Possessed: The Social Origins of WitchcraftSalem Possessed: The Social Origins of Witchcraft (Cambridge: Harvard University Press, 1974). Co-author with Stephen Nissenbaum.
  - 1974 Winner of the John H. Dunning Prize of the American Historical Association
  - 1975 Nominated for a National Book Award in the Category History
- The Salem Witchcraft Papers, co-editor with Stephen Nissenbaum (3 vols., NY: Da Capo Press, 1977)
- Urban Masses and Moral Order in America, 1820–1920 (Cambridge: Harvard University Press, 1978)
- By the Bomb's Early Light: American Thought and Culture at the Dawn of the Atomic Age (NY: Pantheon, 1985; 2nd edn. with a new introduction, Chapel Hill: University of North Carolina Press, 1994)
- Reagan as President: Contemporary Views of the Man, His Politics, and His Politicies, edited with an introduction by Paul Boyer (Chicago, Ivan R. Dee, 1990).
- When Time Shall Be No More: Prophecy Belief in Modern American Culture (Cambridge: Harvard University Press, 1992)
- Fallout: A Historian Reflects on America's Half-Century Encounter With Nuclear Weapons (Columbus: Ohio State University Press, 1998)
- American History: A Very Short Introduction (Oxford: Oxford University Press, 2012)
- The Oxford Encyclopedia of American Cultural and Intellectual History, co-authored with Joan Shelley Rubin and Scott E. Casper (Oxford University Press, 2013; ISBN 9780199764358)
