= Ernest Freeberg =

American historian

Ernest Freeberg is an American historian whose research focuses on 19th and 20th-century American culture. He is currently a professor at the University of Tennessee, and served as head of the Department of History. In 2002, he was awarded the John H. Dunning Prize.

== Bibliography ==
- The Education of Laura Bridgman: First Deaf and Blind Person to Learn Language (2002)
- Democracy's Prisoner: Eugene V. Debs, the Great War, and the Right to Dissent (2008)
- The Age of Edison: Electric Light and the Invention of Modern America (2013)
- A Traitor to His Species: Henry Bergh and the Birth of Animal Rights in America (2020)
