= Kathleen M. Brown =

American historian

Kathleen M. Brown is an American historian specializing in early American and Atlantic history, the history of comparative race, gender, and sex, and the history of abolition and human rights. She is currently the David Boies Professor of History at the University of Pennsylvania.

== Life and career ==
Brown received her B.A. from Wesleyan University and earned an M.A. and Ph.D. from the University of Wisconsin. She received a Guggenheim Fellowship in 2015.

Her first book, Good Wives, Nasty Wenches, and Anxious Patriarchs: Gender, Race, and Power in Colonial Virginia, won the American Historical Association's John H. Dunning Prize, while her second book, Foul Bodies: Cleanliness in Early America, won the Organization of American Historians' Lawrence W. Levine Award and the Society for the History of the Early American Republic's Best Book prize.

She has been a participating speaker in the Organization of American Historians' Distinguished Lectureship Program.

== Works ==
- Foul Bodies: Cleanliness in Early America (Society and the Sexes in the Modern World) (Yale University Press, 2009/2011) ISBN 978-0300171556.
- Good Wives, Nasty Wenches, and Anxious Patriarchs: Gender, Race, and Power in Colonial Virginia (University of North Carolina Press, 1996) ISBN 978-0807846230.
- Undoing Slavery: Bodies, Race, and Rights in the Age of Abolition (University of Pennsylvania Press, 2023) ISBN 978-1512823271.
