= Robert Lee Beisner =

American historian

- Born: 8 March 1936; Lexington, Nebraska, US
- Died: 31 January 2018 (aged 81); Washington, District of Columbia, US
- Occupation: Historian

Robert Lee Beisner (1936–2018) was an American historian and university professor. He specialized in the history of international diplomacy. He is perhaps best known for his exhaustive biography of former secretary of state Dean Acheson.

== Personal life ==
He was born on 8 March 1936 in Lexington, Dawson County, Nebraska, United States.

He married Mary Elizabeth Brinton Stone on June 14, 1959.

He died on 31 January 2018 in Washington, D.C. His obituary was published by the Washington Post.

== Education ==
He completed his M.A. in 1960 and his Ph. D. in 1965, both from the University of Chicago.

== Career ==
He served as an associate professor of history at American University.

He retired from his teaching career in 1998.

== Awards and honours ==
He received the Allan Nevins Prize from the Society of American Historians in 1966. He also received the John H. Dunning Prize from the American Historical Association in 1968 for his book Twelve Against Empire: The Anti-Imperialists, 1898-1900.

He has also received the Robert H. Ferrell Award from the Society for Historians of American Foreign Relations, the Douglas Dillon Award from the American Academy of Diplomacy, and the Arthur Ross Silver Medal Book Award from the Council on Foreign Relations.

== Bibliography ==
He is the author of a number of notable books:

- Dean Acheson: A Life in the Cold War
- From the Old Diplomacy to the New, 1865-1900 - From the old diplomacy to the new, 1865-1900
- Twelve Against Empire: The Anti Imperialists, 1898-1900 - Twelve against empire; the anti-imperialists, 1898-1900
- Arms at Rest: Peacemaking and Peacekeeping in American History
- American Foreign Relations Since 1600: A Guide to the Literature

== See also ==
- Dean Acheson
- John H. Dunning Prize
