= John Patrick Diggins =

American historian (1935–2009)

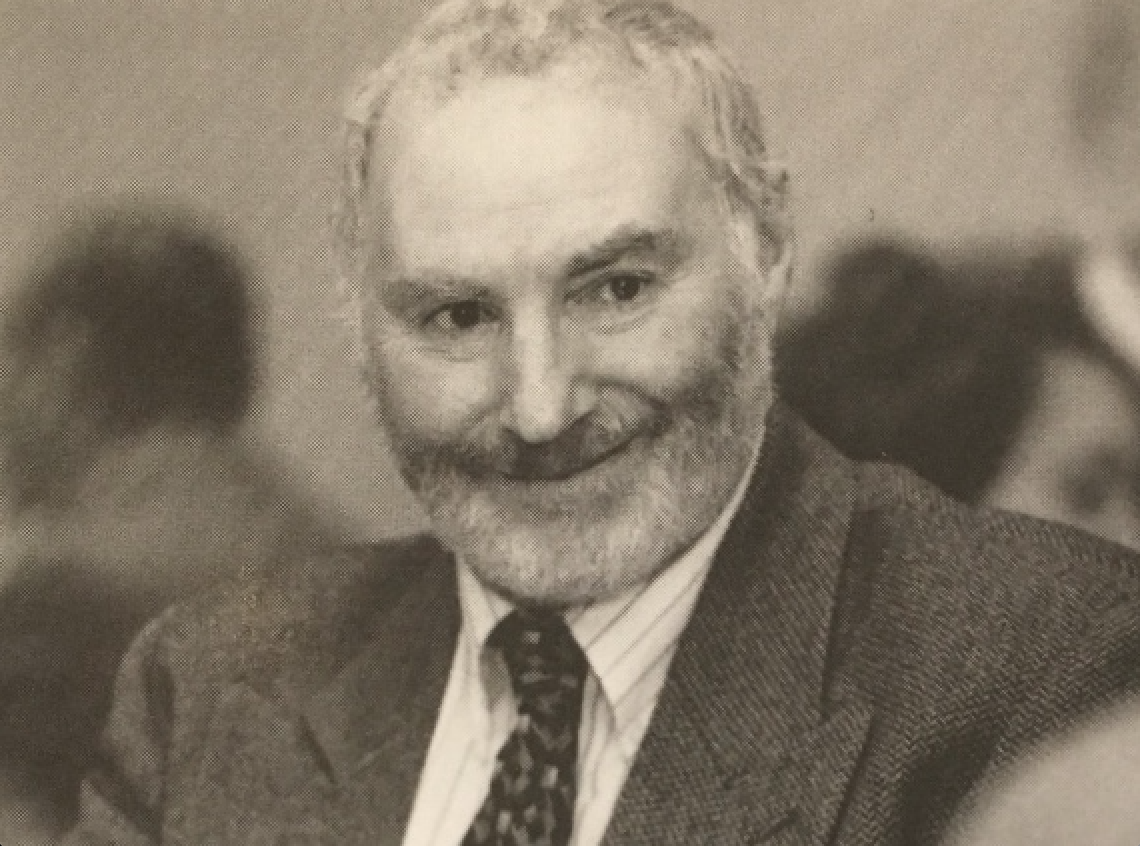
- Diggins in 2008
- Born: John Patrick Diggins; April 1, 1935; San Francisco, California U.S.
- Died: January 28, 2009 (aged 73); Manhattan, New York U.S.
- Education: University of California Berkeley; University of Southern California (Doctorate)
- Occupations: History professor, author
- Years active: 1972–2007
- Partner: Judith Diggins (1960–1978) Elizabeth Harlan (1994–2009)
- Children: 2
- Awards: Guggenheim Fellowship; John H. Dunning Prize; Rockefeller Foundation

John Patrick Diggins (April 1, 1935 – January 28, 2009) was an American professor of history at the University of California, Irvine, Princeton University, and the City University of New York Graduate Center.

He was the author/editor of more than a dozen books and thirty articles on widely varied topics in U.S. intellectual history.

== Early life and education ==
Diggins was born in San Francisco to John Diggins Sr., who worked for the City of San Francisco as a gardener, and Anne Naughton Diggins. Both of his parents were immigrants from Ireland. Raised in a Roman Catholic household, he attended and graduated from Sacred Heart Cathedral Preparatory School.

Diggins received a bachelor's degree from the University of California, Berkeley, in 1957, a master's degree from San Francisco State College, and a doctorate in history from the University of Southern California in 1964. He was an assistant professor at San Francisco State College from 1963 to 1969; an associate professor, and then full professor at the University of California, Irvine from 1969 to 1990; and from 1990, a Distinguished Professor at the CUNY Graduate Center.

== Career ==
Diggins taught history at San Francisco State University until 1969, when he accepted a position at UC Irvine. There, he served as an associate professor. In 1990, Diggins moved to City University of New York Graduate Center (CUNY), where he stayed for two decades. He served as acting director of the Graduate Center from 1996 to 1997. For a year, Diggins held the chair in American Civilization at the École des hautes études, Paris, and was also a visiting professor at Cambridge and Princeton Universities. Additionally, Diggins was a consultant and frequent lecturer at the University of London and Columbia University.

Diggins' first book was Mussolini and Fascism: The View from America, in which he described the popularity of the Italian dictator prior to World War II and the reaction to him in the U.S. The book won Diggins the 1972 John H. Dunning Prize. He then wrote The American Left in the Twentieth Century (1973), which was later revised in 1992 as The Rise and Fall of the American Left. In this book, Diggins was critical of the New Left and even tougher on the academic left, which had to a considerable extent inspired the New Left. He was also dismissive of the postmodernist ideas of Michel Foucault and Jacques Derrida. His next book was Up from Communism, which described four prominent doctrinaire liberal thinkers who changed their ideology to embrace conservatism.

In the best-selling Ronald Reagan: Fate, Freedom, and the Making of History, Diggins asserted that Reagan was treated dismissively, and that his virtues were truly liberal. That view had been contrary to Diggins's original view of Reagan as governor of California during the 1960s Berkeley protests, in which Reagan, as Diggins remembered, seemed to be "standing for tear gas and police." Diggins declared Reagan to be "one of the three or four truly great presidents in U.S. history." He stated that his view of Reagan changed upon reading Reagan's writings that were released after Reagan's death. Diggins concluded that Reagan was, in fact, "far from conservative" and more on the liberal side of the ideological spectrum. Instead of his previous left-wing assumptions about him, Diggins wrote, "Reagan was the great liberating spirit of modern American history, a political romantic impatient with the status quo."

Diggins' last book was Why Niebuhr Now?, describing the shifting political loyalties of Reinhold Niebuhr. The book was published posthumously in 2011.

An obituary reported that Diggins "was "critical of the anti-capitalist Left for seeing in the abolition of property an end to oppression," but also "critical of the anti-government Right for seeing in the eradication of political authority the end of tyranny and the restoration of liberty." He stated, "I am left of right and right of left."

Diggins was a consultant on various documentary films, including Between the Wars, Reds, John Dos Passos, The Greenwich Village Rebellion, Emma Goldman, Arguing the World, The Future of the American Left, and Il Duce, Fascismo e American (Italian television). Diggins also appeared in numerous interviews with C-SPAN.

Diggins earned a Guggenheim Fellowship in 1975, became a resident scholar at the Rockefeller Foundation in 1989, and was nominated for the National Book Award for History. He was a critically acclaimed member of the American Historical Association, American Studies Association, and American Philosophical Society. After his death, the John Patrick Diggins '53 Endowed Scholarship was created in his name at Sacred Heart Preparatory School in San Francisco.

== Criticism ==
In a review of Diggins' Ronald Reagan: Fate, Freedom, and the Making of History Rich Lowry, editor of the National Review, wrote,

Diggins seems blinded by Reagan's sunniness, which, in this interpretation, was not just a matter of temperament, but reflective of a deep philosophical and religious conviction. Reagan, Diggins maintains, sought to rid "America of a God of judgment and punishment." This is absurd. Reagan had a charitable view of human nature and a relaxed, nonjudgmental air, but there is no denying his deeply felt social conservatism. He wrote – as a sitting president, no less – the anti-abortion tract "Abortion and the Conscience of the Nation".

== Personal life ==
Diggins' marriage to his wife, Judith, ended in divorce. As a California native, he lived in Laguna Beach, California, for years while he taught at UC Irvine. Later, Diggins lived on the Upper West Side in Manhattan while teaching at CUNY Graduate Center. He died in Manhattan on January 28, 2009, after a battle with Colorectal cancer. He was survived by his companion of fifteen years, the author Elizabeth Harlan; a son and a daughter; two sisters; and two grandchildren.

== Bibliography ==
- (2011) Why Niebuhr Now? (ISBN 9780226148830)
- (2007) Eugene O'Neill's America: Desire Under Democracy (ISBN 9780226148809)
- (2007) Ronald Reagan: Fate, Freedom, and the Making of History
- (2004) The Portable John Adams (editor)
- (2003) John Adams: The American Presidents Series
- (2000) On Hallowed Ground: Abraham Lincoln and the Foundations of American History
- (1997) The Liberal Persuasion: Arthur Schlesinger, Jr. and the Challenge of the American Past (co-editor)
- (1996) Max Weber: Politics and the Spirit of Tragedy
- (1994) The Promise of Pragmatism: Modernism and the Crisis of Knowledge and Authority (ISBN 9780226148786)
- (1988) The Proud Decades: America in War and Peace, 1941–1960
- (1984) The Lost Soul of American Politics: Virtue, Self-Interest, and the Foundations of Liberalism (ISBN 9780226148779)
- (1981) The Problem of Authority in America (co-editor)
- (1978) The Bard of Savagery: Thorstein Veblen and Modern Social Theory
- (1975) Up From Communism: Conservative Odysseys in American Intellectual History (ISBN 978-0-06-011042-0)
- (1973) The American Left in the Twentieth Century (reworked into The Rise and Fall of the American Left, 1992)
- (1972) Mussolini and Fascism: The View from America

Journal articles

- Dos Passos and Veblen's Villains, Antioch Review 23, no. 4 (1963–1964): 485–500.
- Flirtation with Fascism: American Pragmatic Liberals and Mussolini's Italy, American Historical Review 71, no. 2 (1966): 487–506.
- The American Writer, Fascism, and the Liberation of Italy, American Quarterly 18, no. 4 (1966): 599–614.
- Mussolini and America: Hero-Worship, Charisma, and the "Vulgar Talent," Historian 28, no. 4 (1966): 559–85.
- American Catholics and Italian Fascism, Journal of Contemporary History 2, no. 4 (1967): 51–68.
- The Italo-American Antifascist Opposition, Journal of American History 54, no. 3 (1967)
- Ideology and Pragmatism: Philosophy or Passion?, American Political Science Review 64, no. 3 (1970): 899–906.
- Consciousness and Ideology in American History: The Burden of Daniel J. Boorstin, American Historical Review 76, no. 1 (1971): 99–118.
- The Perils of Naturalism: Some Reflections on Daniel J. Boorstin's Approach to American History, American Quarterly 23, no. 2 (1971): 153–80.
- Thoreau, Marx, and the "Riddle" of Alienation, Social Research 39, no. 4 (1972)
- Getting Hegel out of History: Max Eastman's Quarrel with Marxism, American Historical Review 79, no. 1 (1974): 38–71.
- Visions of Chaos and Visions of Order: Dos Passos as Historian, American Literature 46, no. 3 (1974): 329–46.
- Four Theories in Search of a Reality: James Burnham, Soviet Communism, and the Cold War, American Political Science Review 70, no. 2 (1976): 492–508.
- Slavery, Race, and Equality: Jefferson and the Pathos of the Enlightenment, American Quarterly 28, no. 2 (1976): 206–28.
- Animism and the Origins of Alienation: The Anthropological Perspective of Thorstein Veblen, History and Theory 16, no. 2 (1977): 113–36.
- Reification and the Cultural Hegemony of Capitalism: The Perspectives of Marx and Veblen, Social Research 44, no. 2 (1977).
- Barbarism and Capitalism: The Strange Perspectives of Thorstein Veblem, Marxist Perspectives 1, no. 2 (1978): 138–57.
- The Socialization of Authority and the Dilemmas of American Liberalism, Social Research 46 (1979): 454–86.
- Power and Authority in American History: The Case of Charles A. Beard and his Critics, American Historical Review 86, no. 4 (1981): 701–30.
- The Oyster and the Pearl: The Problem of Contextualism in Intellectual History, History and Theory 23, no. 2 (1984): 151–69.
- Republicanism and Progressivism, American Quarterly 37, no. 4 (1985): 572–98.
- "Who Bore the Failure of the Light": Henry Adams and the Crisis of Authority, New England Quarterly 58, no. 2 (1985): 165- 92.
- Comrades and Citizens: New Mythologies in American Historiography, American Historical Review 90, no. 3 (1985): 614–38.
- Between Bailyn and Beard: The Perspectives of Gordon S. Wood, William and Mary Quarterly vol. XLIV (1987): 563–68.
- John Adams et les Critiques Francais de la Constitution Americaine ("John Adams and the French Critics of the Constitution"), La Revue Tocqueville 9 (1987–1988): 155–80.
- The Misuses of Gramsci, The Journal of American History 75, no. 1 (1988): 141–45.
- Knowledge and Sorrow: Louis Hartz's Quarrel with American History, Political Theory 16, no. 3 (1988): 355–76.
- Class, Classical, and Consensus Views of the Constitution, University of Chicago Law Review 55, no. 2 (1988): 555–70.
- From Pragmatism to Natural Law: Walter Lippmann's Quest for the Foundation of Legitimacy, Political Theory 19, no. 4 (1991): 519–38.
- Thorstein Veblen and the Literature of the Theory Class, International Journal of Politics, Culture, and Society 6, no. 4 (1993): 481–90.
- America's Two Visitors: Tocqueville and Weber, La Revue Tocqueville 17, no. 2 (1996): 165–182.
- Arthur O. Lovejoy and the Challenge of Intellectual History, Journal of the History of Ideas 67, no. 1 (2006): 181–208.
