= American Nietzsche =

2011 non-fiction book by Jennifer Ratner-Rosenhagen

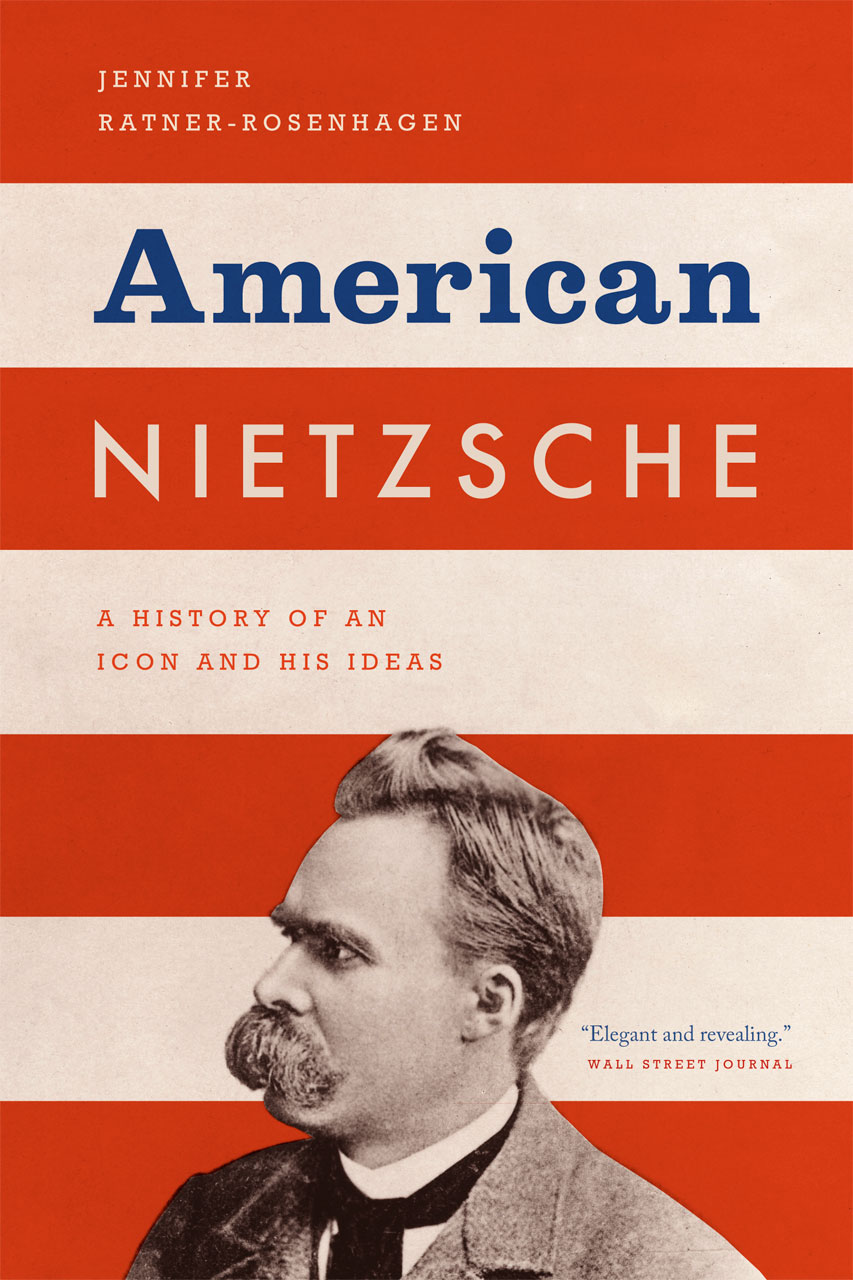
- Author: Jennifer Ratner-Rosenhagen
- Language: English
- Subject: Friedrich Nietzsche
- Publisher: University of Chicago Press
- Publication date: 2011
- Publication place: United States
- Media type: Print (Hardcover and Paperback)
- Pages: 464
- ISBN: 9780226705842

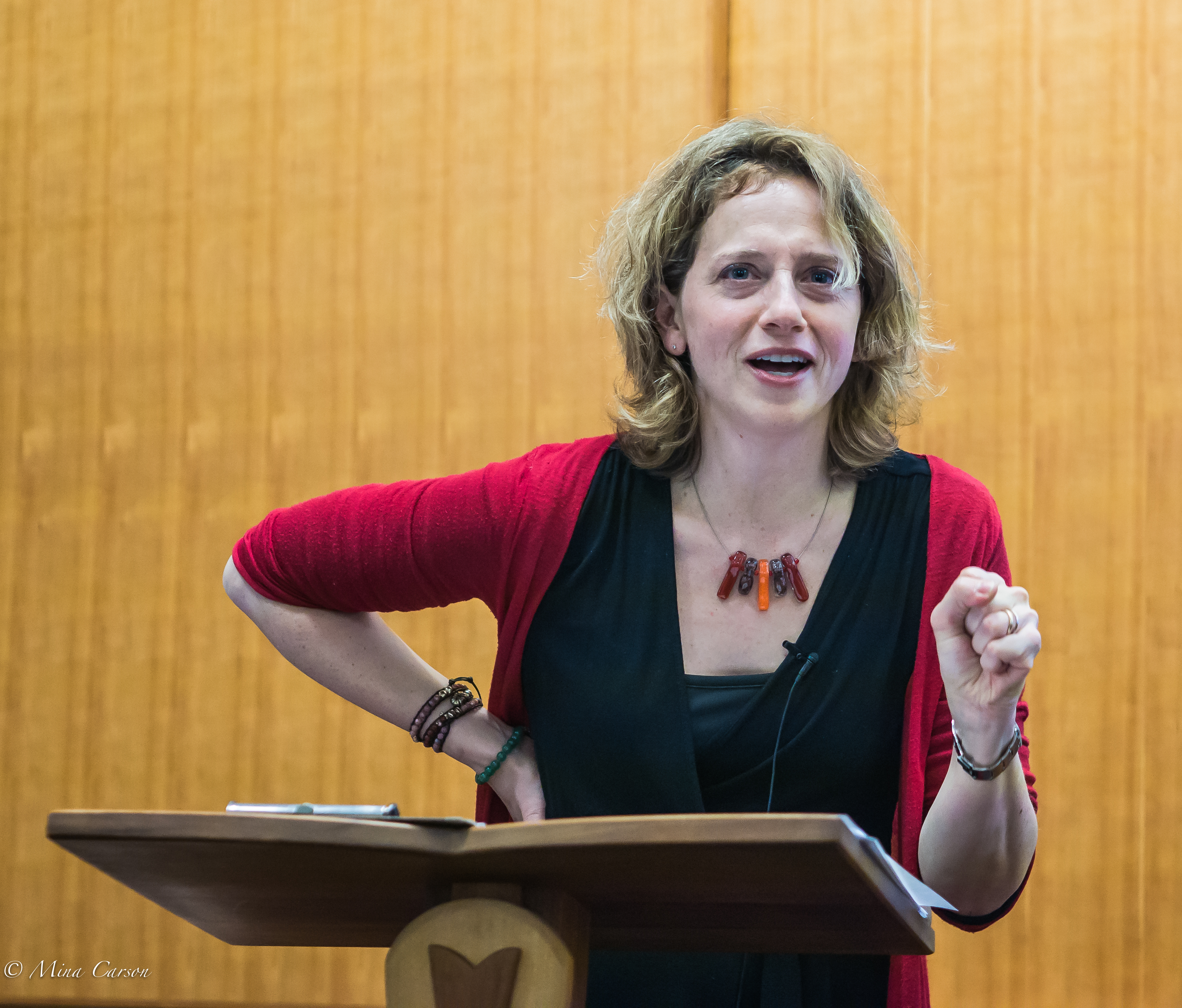
Jennifer Ratner-Rosenhagen, the author

American Nietzsche: A History of an Icon and His Ideas is a 2011 book about the reception of Friedrich Nietzsche in the United States by Jennifer Ratner-Rosenhagen. It won the American Historical Association's John H. Dunning Prize (2013), Society for U.S. Intellectual History Annual Book Award (2013), and Morris D. Forkosch Prize for the Best First Book in Intellectual History (2013).
