= Louis C. Hunter =

American economist (1898–1984)

Louis C. Hunter (1898 – 1984) was a professor of economic history at American University. His most famous work, Steamboats on the Western Rivers, an Economic and Technological History, was published in 1949.

Hunter grew up in a steamboat culture as he spent his first eighteen years living on the banks of the Ohio River, at Wellsburg, West Virginia, and the Mississippi River, at Moline, Illinois. After studying engineering and economic history at Harvard University, he received a doctorate in 1928. For the next twenty years, Hunter was engaged in research for Steamboats on the Western Rivers. In 1952, his scholarship was acknowledged when he was awarded the Dunning Prize by the American Historical Association.

In 1937, Hunter joined the faculty of American University where he was a professor of history until his retirement in 1966. In 1979, the first volume of his trilogy, A History of Industrial Power in the United States, 1780-1930, was published. In 1983, Dr. Hunter was awarded the Leonardo da Vinci Medal by the Society of History of Technology.

Hunter was married and the father of two daughters. Louis C. Hunter died on March 22, 1984.

== Bibliography ==
- Hunter, Louis C. (1949). Steamboats on the western rivers, an economic and technological history. Cambridge: Harvard University Press
- Hunter, Louis C. (1979). A history of industrial power in the United States, 1780-1930: water power. Charlottesville, Va.: University Press of Virginia
- Hunter, Louis C. (1985). A history of industrial power in the United States, 1780-1930: steam power. Charlottesville, Va.: University Press of Virginia
- Hunter, Louis C. and Lynwood Bryant (1991). A history of industrial power in the United States, 1780-1930: the transmission of power. Boston: MIT Press
