= Jen Manion =

American historian, author, and professor

- Occupations: Professor and author

Academic background
- Education: Rutgers University

Academic work
- Discipline: Historian
- Sub-discipline: Social and cultural history
- Notable works: Female Husbands: A Trans History (2020), Liberty's Prisoners: Carceral Culture in Early America (2015)
- Website: jenmanion.com

Jen Manion is a social and cultural historian, author, and professor of History and Sexuality, Women's and Gender Studies at Amherst College. Manion is the author of Female Husbands: A Trans History and Liberty's Prisoners: Carceral Culture in Early America.

== Early life and education ==
Manion was raised in the borough of St.Clair, outside of Pottsville, Pennsylvania. In a 2018 essay that describes Manion's childhood experiences, Manion wrote, "I have always been a gender warrior and a gender outlaw."

Manion completed a BA in history from the University of Pennsylvania, and a PhD in history from Rutgers University.

== Career ==
Manion was a member of the history department faculty at Connecticut College for ten years before becoming an associate professor at Amherst College in 2016. Manion was also the founding director of the LGBTQ Resource Center at Connecticut College. In 2021, Manion became a full professor at Amherst and received an honorary masters of arts degree.

On writing, Manion has stated, "My topics choose me. As a historian, what I write about depends on what sources I have found. But I only spend time on things that have relevance beyond the world of academic history - such as mass incarceration or transgender liberation - otherwise, I do not think I am making the best use of my time and resources." In 2015, as an associate professor of history at Connecticut College, Manion published Liberty's Prisoners: Carceral Culture in Early America.

In a 2016 interview, while discussing a developing research and writing project then titled "Born in the Wrong Time: Transgender Archives and the History of Possibility, 1770-1870," Manion stated, "most of the records are about such people rather than by them, so I try to write about people in broad, expansive ways that create space and possibility for how they might have lived, how they understood themselves, and how other people viewed and treated them", and further stated, "This project is partly about recovering an archive but it also very much about how we think and write about the past as well." Female Husbands: A Trans History was published by Cambridge University Press in 2020.

== Books ==
- Downs, Jim; Manion, Jen, eds. (2004). Taking Back the Academy! History of Activism, History as Activism. Routledge. ISBN 9780415948104.
- Manion, Jen (2015). Liberty's Prisoners: Carceral Culture in Early America. University of Pennsylvania Press. ISBN 9780812247572.
- Manion, Jen (2018). "Transgender Representations, Identities, and Communities". In Hartigan-O'Connor, Ellen; Materson, Lisa G. (eds.). The Oxford Handbook of American Women's and Gender History. Oxford University Press. doi:10.1093/oxfordhb/9780190222628.013.34. ISBN 9780190222628.
- Manion, Jen (2020). Female Husbands: A Trans History. Cambridge University Press. ISBN 9781108652834.

== Awards ==
- 2016 Mary Kelley Book Prize by the Society for Historians of the Early American Republic (Liberty's Prisoners: Carceral Culture in Early America)
- 2020 British Association for Victorian Studies Best Book Prize (Female Husbands: A Trans History)
- Finalist, 2021 Lawrence W. Levine Award, Organization of American Historians (Female Husbands: A Trans History)

== Honors ==
- 2018 elected member of the Massachusetts Historical Society
- 2020 elected member of the American Antiquarian Society

== Personal life ==
Manion married Jessica Halem in Provincetown, Massachusetts in 2014.
