= Jennifer Graber =

American historian

- Occupation: Historian
- Spouse: none
- Awards: Guggenheim Fellowship (2023)

Academic background
- Education: Goshen College; Candler School of Theology; Duke University
- Thesis: Christianity Imprisoned: Religion and the Making of the Penitentiary, 1797-1860 (2006)
- Doctoral advisor: Grant Wacker

Academic work
- Discipline: History
- Sub-discipline: History of religion in the United States
- Institutions: College of Wooster; University of Texas at Austin

Jennifer Graber is an American historian. Originally a classical singer while studying at Goshen College, she later shifted towards studying history during her graduate studies, before becoming the Gwyn Shive, Anita Nordan Lindsay, and Joe & Cherry Gray Professor of Religious Studies at the University of Texas at Austin. A 2023 Guggenheim Fellow, she has written on the history of religion in the United States: The Furnace of Affliction (2011) and Gods of Indian Country (2018).

== Biography ==
A native of Goshen, Indiana, Graber got her Bachelor of Arts degree (1995) in Music at Goshen College, where she performed as an opera singer at the university, including at their centennial concert in 1995. She later obtained her Master of Theological Studies degree (1999) at the Candler School of Theology, and Doctor of Philosophy degree (2006) in American religious history at Duke University; her doctoral dissertation Christianity Imprisoned: Religion and the Making of the Penitentiary, 1797-1860 was supervised by Grant Wacker.

In 2006, Graber became Assistant Professor of Religious Studies at the College of Wooster. In 2012, she moved to the University of Texas at Austin (UT Austin) and became Associate Professor of Religious Studies there. On November 5, 2019, she was promoted to Gwyn Shive, Anita Nordan Lindsay, and Joe & Cherry Gray Professor. She became the Associate Director of UT Austin's Native American and Indigenous Studies Program in 2019, as well as the Associate Chair of UT Austin's Department of Religious Studies in 2022.

Graber has authored two books on the history of religion in the United States: The Furnace of Affliction (2011) and Gods of Indian Country (2018). She has also taught classes in religion in the United States, as well as freedom of religion. She collaborated with the Kiowa Tribal Museum to create the Kiowa Calendar Project. In 2023, she was awarded a Guggenheim Fellowship in Religion.

== Bibliography ==
- The Furnace of Affliction (2011)
- Gods of Indian Country (2018)
