= Jennifer Ratner-Rosenhagen =

Intellectual historian

- Education: University of Rochester; Brandeis University
- Occupation: Intellectual historian
- Known for: American Nietzsche

External media

Audio
- Podcast interview with Ratner-Rosenhagen on The Ideas That Made America

Video
- The author discusses American Nietzsche

Jennifer Ratner-Rosenhagen is Merle Curti and Vilas-Borghesi Distinguished Achievement Professor of History at the University of Wisconsin–Madison and the author of American Nietzsche (2011) and The Ideas That Made America (2019). She was a Radcliffe Institute Fellow in 2014–2015.

== Education ==
- 2003: Ph.D. in History of American Civilization, Brandeis University.
- 1992: B.A. in History, University of Rochester.

== Works ==
- American Nietzsche. University of Chicago Press. 2011. ISBN 9780226006765.
- The Ideas That Made America: A Brief History. Oxford University Press. 2019. ISBN 9780190625368. OCLC 1105850389.
- Isaac, Joel; Kloppenberg, James T.; O'Brien, Michael; Ratner-Rosenhagen, Jennifer, eds. (2016). The Worlds of American Intellectual History. Oxford University Press. ISBN 9780190459468. OCLC 1040600434.
- American Intellectual History: A Very Short Introduction. Oxford University Press. 2021. ISBN 978-0-19-062243-5.
