= Lawrence W. Levine Award =

The Lawrence W. Levine Award is an annual book award made by the Organization of American Historians (OAH). The award goes to the best book in American cultural history. The award is named for Professor Lawrence W. Levine, President of the OAH 1992–1993, who wrote extensively in the field. A committee of 5 members of the OAH, chosen annually by the President, makes the award. The winner receives $1000.

== The Awards ==
Source: Organization of American Historians

Year	Winner	Affiliation	Title
2008	Daniel R. Mandell	Truman State University	Tribe, Race, History: Native Americans in Southern New England, 1780-1880
2009	Peggy Pascoe	University of Oregon	What Comes Naturally: Miscegenation Law and the Making of Race in America
2010	Kathleen M. Brown	University of Pennsylvania	Foul Bodies: Cleanliness in Early America
2011	Heather Murray	University of Ottawa	Not in This Family: Gays and the Meaning of Kinship in Postwar North America
2012	Michael Willrich	Brandeis University	Pox: An American History
2013	Adria L. Imada	University of California, San Diego	Aloha America: Hula Circuits through the U.S. Empire
2014	Shawn Michelle Smith	School of the Art Institute of Chicago	At the Edge of Sight: Photography and the Unseen
2015	Allyson Hobbs	Stanford University	A Chosen Exile: A History of Racial Passing in American Life
2016	Benjamin Looker	Saint Louis University	A Nation of Neighborhoods: Imagining Cities, Communities, and Democracy in Postwar America
2017	John W. Troutman	University of Louisiana, Lafayette & National Museum of American History	Kīkā Kila: How the Hawaiian Steel Guitar Changed the Sound of Modern Music
2018	Cary Cordova	University of Texas, Austin	The Heart of the Mission: Latino Art and Politics in San Francisco
2019	Monica Muñoz Martinez	Brown University	The Injustice Never Leaves You: Anti-Mexican Violence in Texas
2020	Erik Seeman	State University of New York at Buffalo	Speaking with the Dead in Early America
2021	Marcia Chatelain	Georgetown University	Franchise: The Golden Arches in Black America
2022	Tiya Alicia Miles	Harvard University	All That She Carried: The Journey of Ashley's Sack, a Black Family Keepsake
2023	James Zarsadiaz	University of San Francisco	Resisting Change in Suburbia: Asian Immigrants and Frontier Nostalgia in L.A.
2024	Rob Goldberg	Germantown Friends School	Radical Play: Revolutionizing Children’s Toys in 1960s and 1970s America
2025	Lindsay Goss	University of Melbourne	F*ck the Army! How Soldiers and Civilians Staged the GI Movement to End the Vietnam War

== See also ==
- List of history awards
